= Anne Veski =

Estonian pop singer (born 1956)

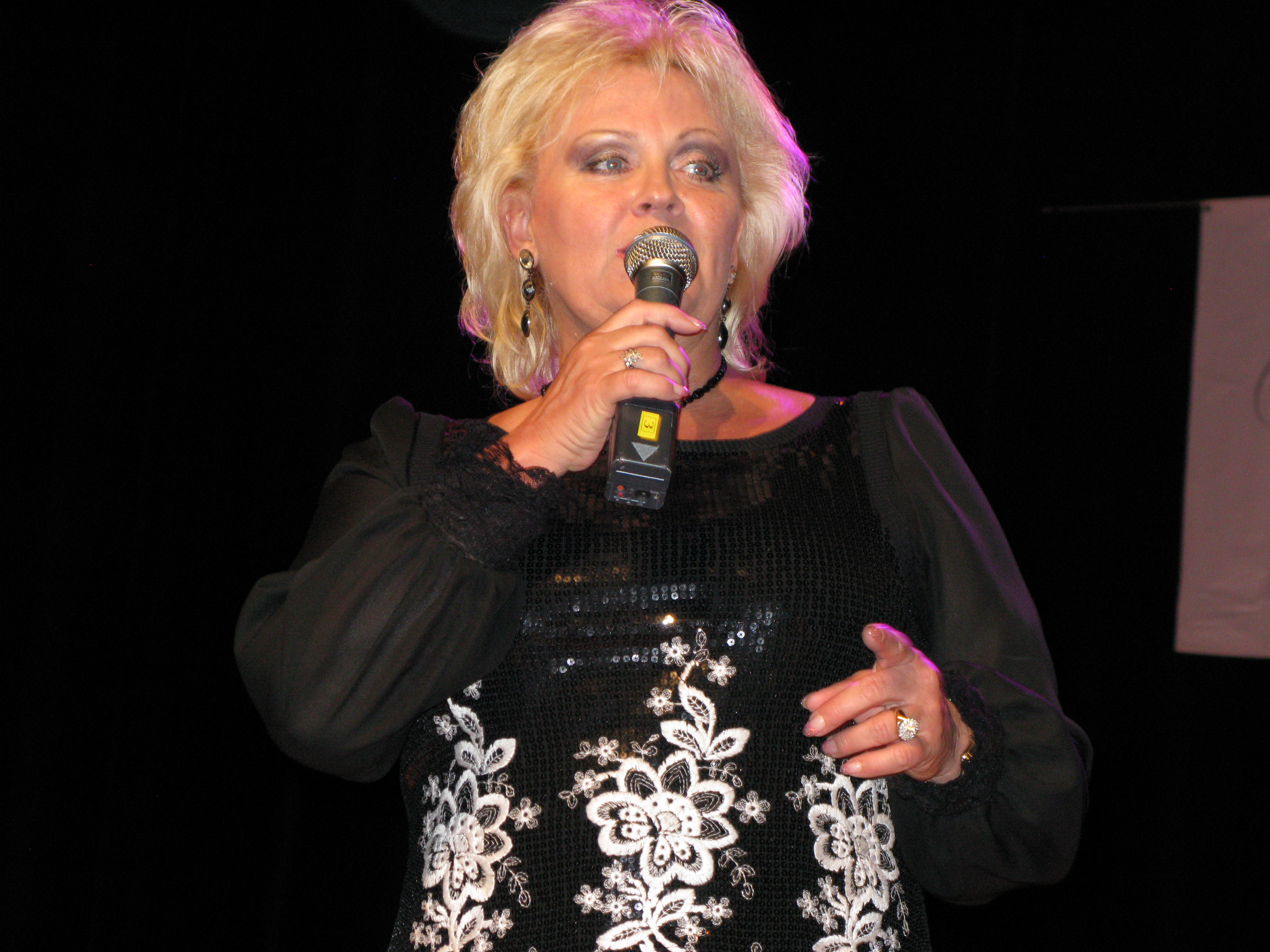
- Anne Veski in 2012
- Born: Anne Vaarmann; 27 February 1956 (age 70); Rapla, then part of Estonian SSR, Soviet Union
- Occupation: Singer
- Years active: 1978–present
- Awards
- Website: anneveski.com

Signature
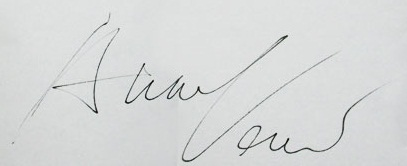

Anne Veski (born Anne Vaarmann; 27 February 1956) is an Estonian pop singer.

== Biography ==
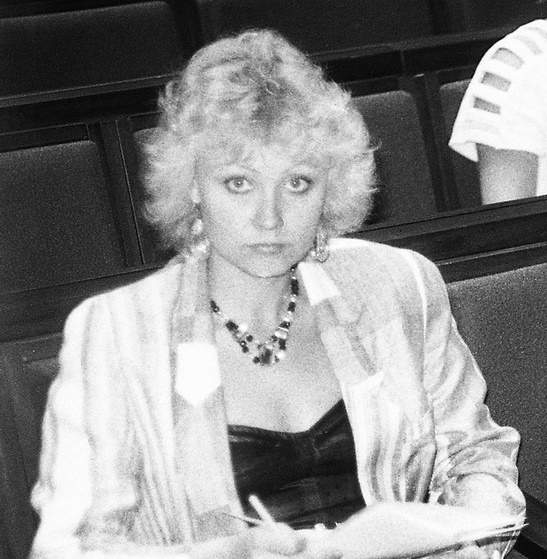
Anne Veski in 1988

Anne Veski was born as Anne Vaarmann in Rapla, Estonia. She graduated from the musical school in the town, after which she entered the Tallinn University of Technology, studying industrial planning. She graduated from the university in 1978, as an economist. Upon finishing her education, she became a professional singer and started working as a soloist with the ensembles Mobile and Vitamiin. Her first notable Estonian language hit song was Roosiaia kuninganna (Queen of the Rose Garden) in 1980. Other prominent Estonian hits were Troopikaöö (Tropical Night) in 1979, Viimane Vaatus (Last Act), in 1983 and Jääd või ei? (Will You Stay or Not?) in 1986.

Having organized the ensemble Nemo, Veski began her solo career in 1984. In that same year, she participated in the Sopot International Song Festival in Poland. In the contest, she received First Awards in two categories: the Amber Nightingale for the best performance of a Polish song (with the entry Polka Idolka) and the Intervision Song Contest for the song Nadezhda gasnet. The Intervision First Prize was in fact a runner-up position, as the winner Krystyna Giżowska received the Grand Prix.

Popular Russian language songs in her repertoire include Vozmi menya s soboy (Take Me With You; 1983), Milyy, goryacho lyubimyy (My Darling Beloved One; 1994) and Radovat'sya zhyzni (Enjoy Life; 2001).

In 1987, Veski performed in the Estonian rockumentary Pingul keel (Tightened String) with other such notable Estonian singers and musicians as Urmas Alender, Ivo Linna and Tõnis Mägi.

On 2 November 2018, Veski was included in a project to commemorate famous Estonian musicians by Tallinn's public transport company. One of the city's trams began to wear a livery with the name Anne on its side, alongside a small description of who she is and her contribution to Estonian music.

== Family ==
Veski first married lyricist Jaak Veski (1956–1994) in 1977. Their daughter Kerli Veski is a diplomat and has worked at the Estonian Consulate in Moscow. The couple divorced in 1981. Veski's second marriage was to her manager, Benno Beltšikov.

== Acknowledgements ==
- Merited Artist of the Estonian SSR (1984)
- Order of the White Star, V Class

== Selected discography ==
=== Solo ===
- Anne Veski (1983)
- Poyot Anna Veski (Поет Анна Вески) (1983) EP
- Pozadi Krutoy Povorot (Позади крутой поворот) (1984) EP
- Sind aeda viia tõotan ma! (1985)
- Ya obeshayu vam sady (Я обещаю вам сады) (1985)
- Radovat'sya zhizni (Радоваться жизни) (1986) EP
- Pihtimus (1995)
- Armukarneval (2000)
- Diiva (2000)
- Ne grusti, chelovek (Не грусти, человек) (2002)
- Lootus (2003)
- Ni o chyom ne zhaleyte (Ни о чем не жалейте) (2004)
- Live 2008 (2008)
- Ingleid ei (2009)
- Kõike juhtub / Vsyo byvaet (Все бывает) (2010)
- Sünnipäev kahele (2011)
- Kallis, kuula (2013)
- Võta minu laul (2016)
- Ma tänan teid : juubelikontserdi live (2016)
- Veereb, aeg nii veereb (2018)

=== Collaborations ===
- Anne Veski ja ansambel "Muusik-Seif" (1983), Anne Veski & Muusik-Seif
- Tänan! (1988), Anne Veski & Nemo
- Kutse tantsule nr. 9: Suvekuningannad (1998), Anne Veski & Marju Länik
- Sünnipäev kahele (2011), Anne Veski & Ain Tammesson
- sinust saati (2024), Anne Veski & Karl Killing
