= Bremen Tower =

Wall tower in Tallinn, Estonia

Coordinates: 59°26′22″N 24°44′57″E

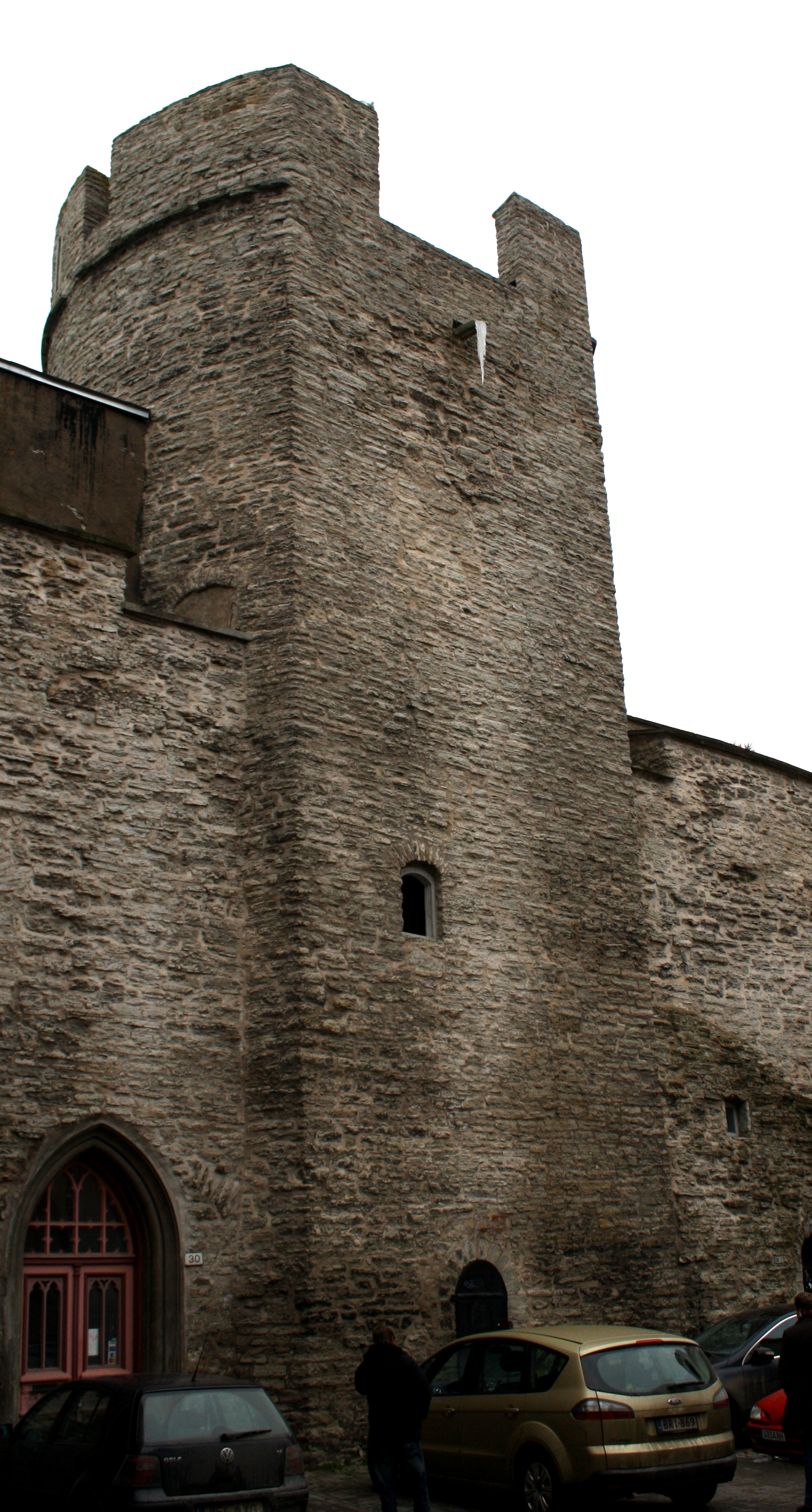
The tower in December 2008

The Bremen Tower (Estonian: Bremeni torn) is a four-story horseshoe-shaped tower on the Walls of Tallinn in Estonia.

== Description ==
The tower is named after the 14th-century town councilor von Bremen.

On one side is the tower behind the Monks, on the other is the Hattorpe tower behind the ramparts. The outer wall is over 2 meters (6 ft 7 in) thick, while the inner wall is 1 meter (3 ft 3 in) thick. On the third floor, there was a chimney for members of the town guard; at the very top, there is an open area for patrols or bombardments, with narrow loopholes in the walls and embrasures.

The second floor is accessible via a staircase inside the ramparts. Until the 17th century, it housed a prison: an unlit room with small windows for ventilation and toilets, with iron rings embedded in the walls. In the early 20th century, the tower was used by the city as a powder magazine, so double locks were installed on the doors. The third and fourth floors were equipped with loopholes and chimneys.

The Bremen Tower is connected to the Bremen Passage, which links Rue Uus tänav to Rue Vene tänav. Outside, along the city walls, there was a belt of defensive fortifications, including earthen ramparts and water-filled fortress moats. At the request of the Swedish government, Tallinn's magistrate in the second half of the 17th century undertook work to move the protective belt away from the ramparts, and the city's territory expanded. Uus tänav Street, for example, was only built in 1653 on the site of the former moat.

== Gallery ==
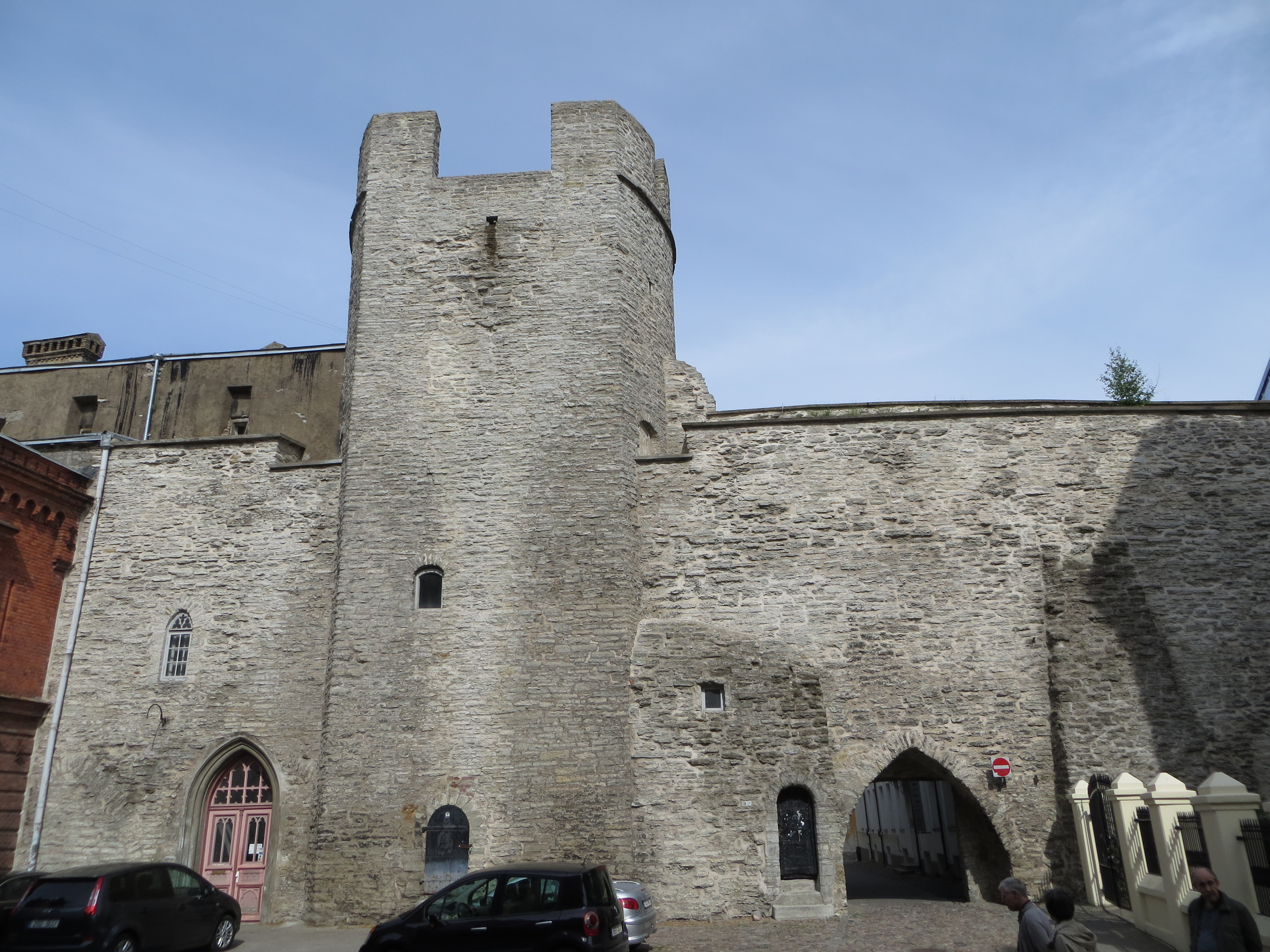

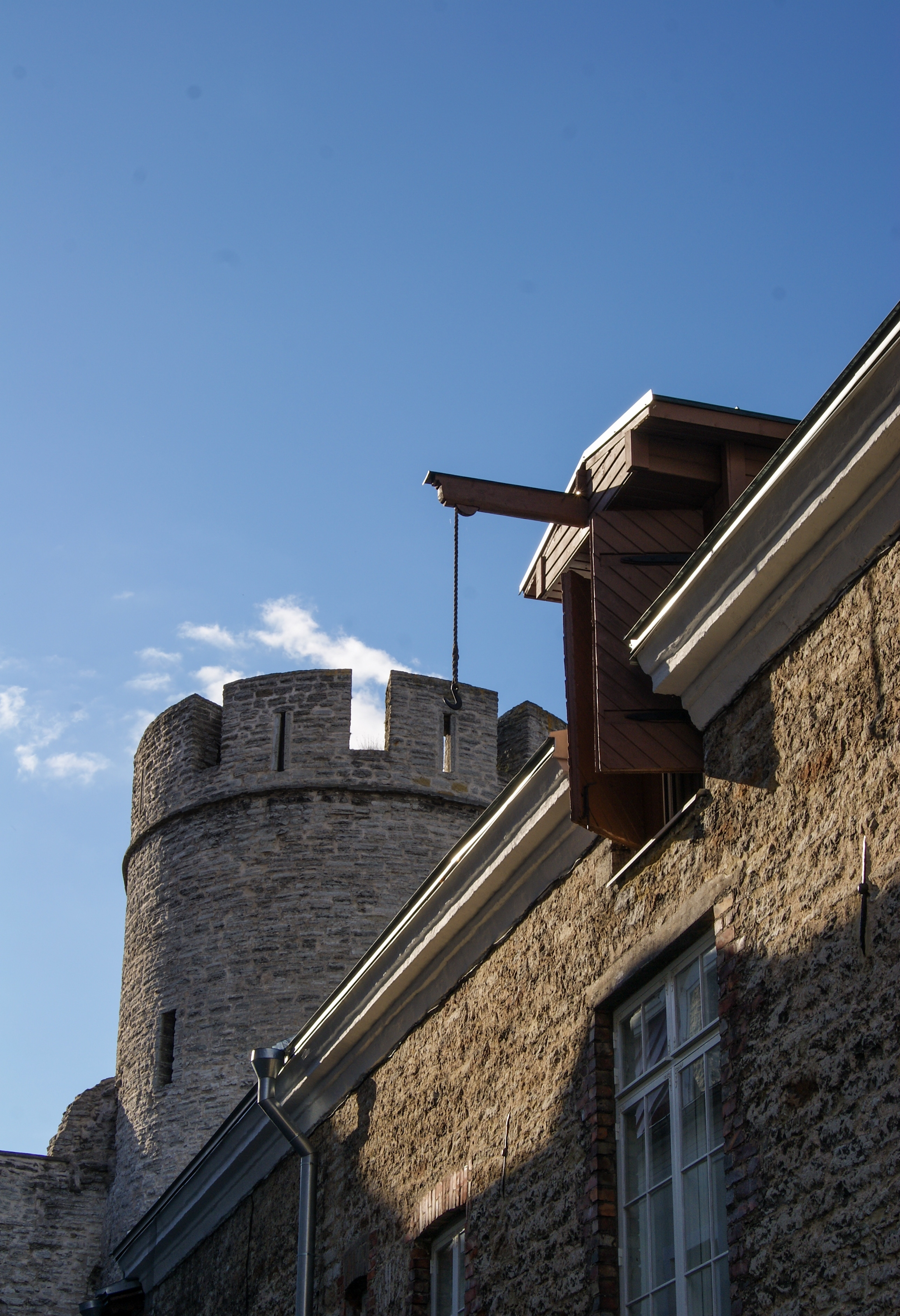

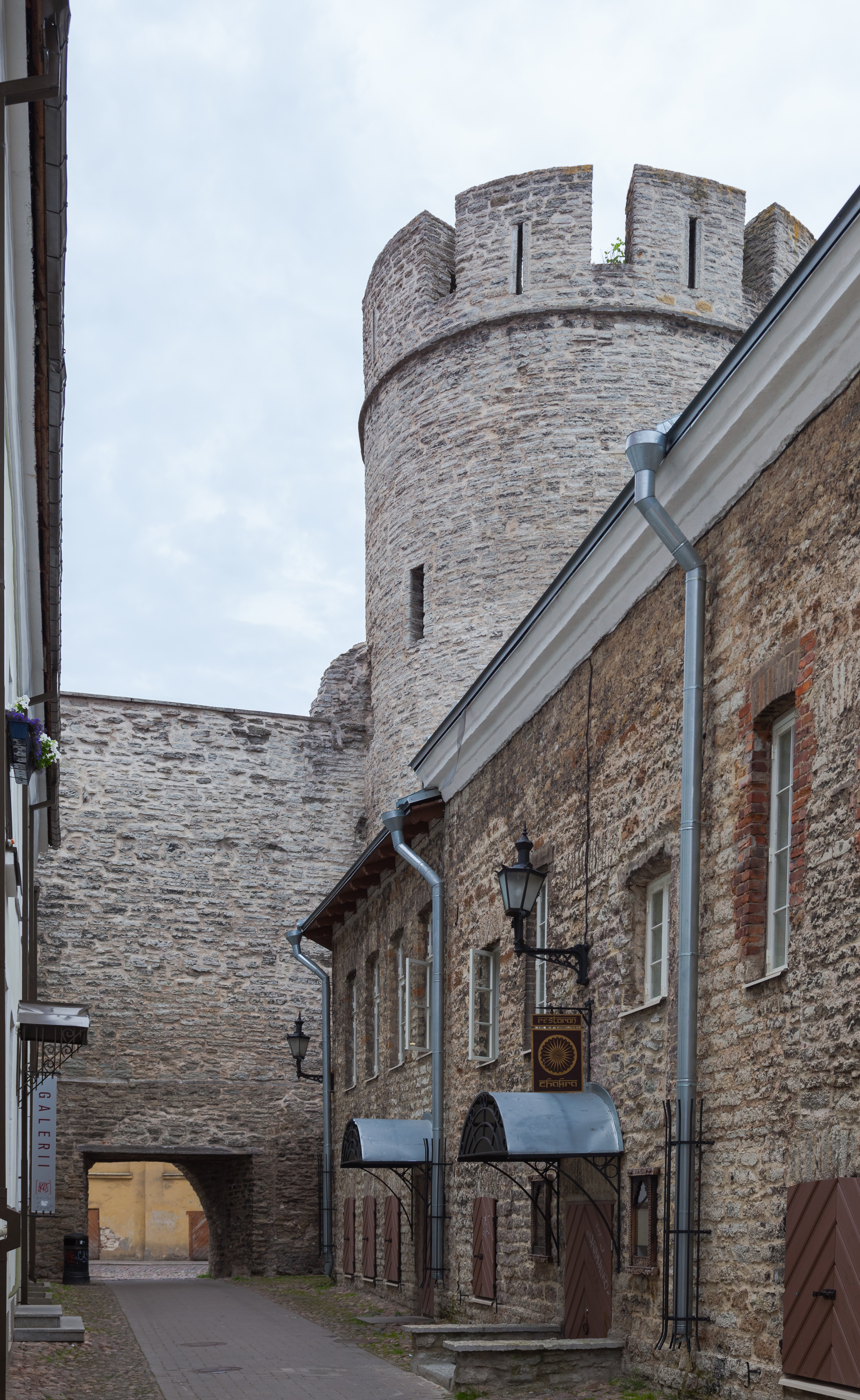

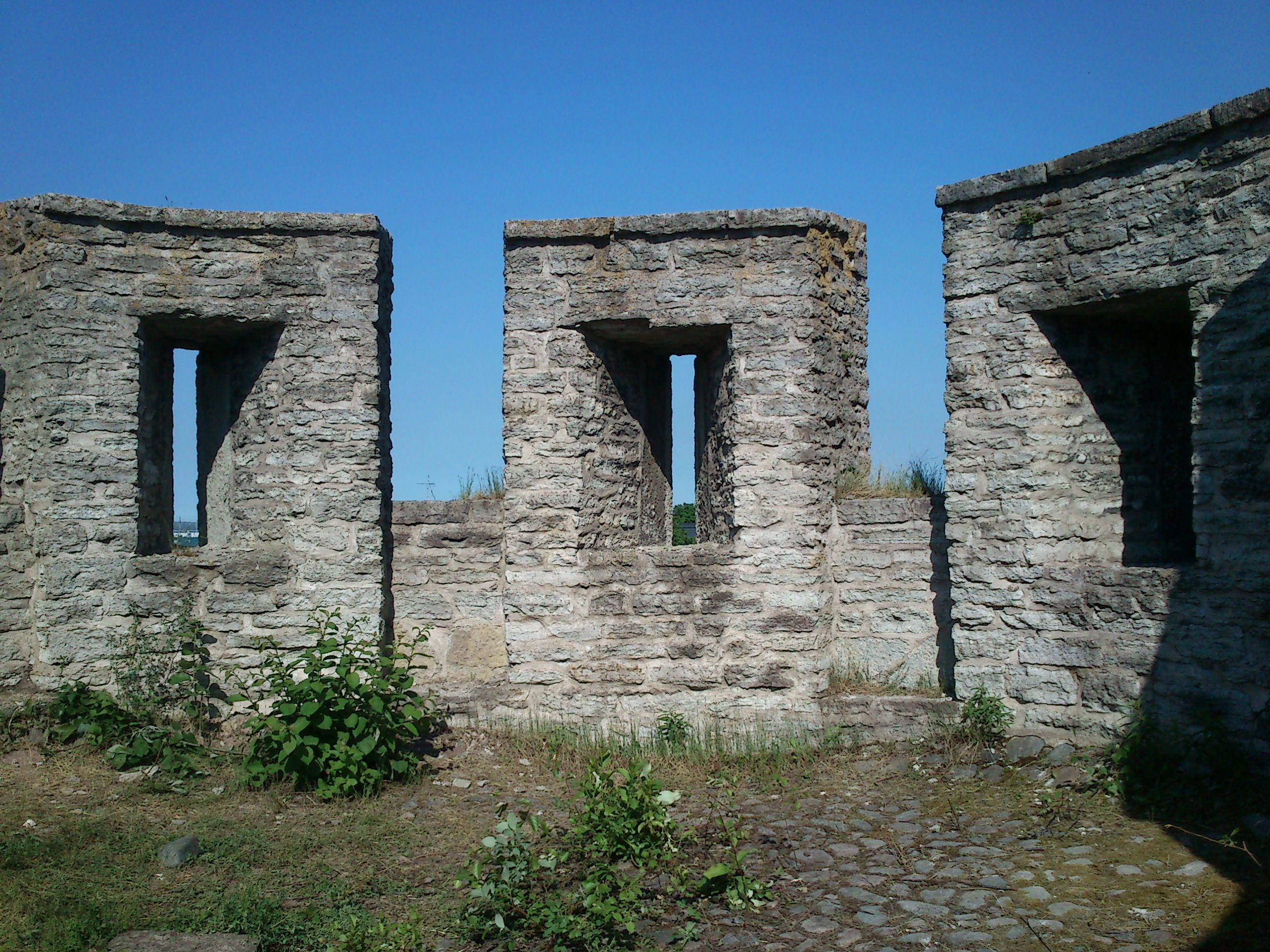
