= Tallinn trams named after musicians =

Thirteen of Tallinn's tram fleet are named after influential figures in Estonian music. The namings were announced and took place between September 2018 and July 2019.

Tallinn's transport company, Tallinna Linnatranspordi AS, decided to rename twelve of Tallinn's newly refurbished KT-6 tram units at a cost of 10.8 million euros. As they believed music had brought Estonia more fame than other industries and exports, they decided to name them after musicians.

Each tram has the musician's first name (or the band's full name) on the side of the first car, and an information poster both inside and outside the tram with some brief information for the public to read.

== Timeline of introduction ==
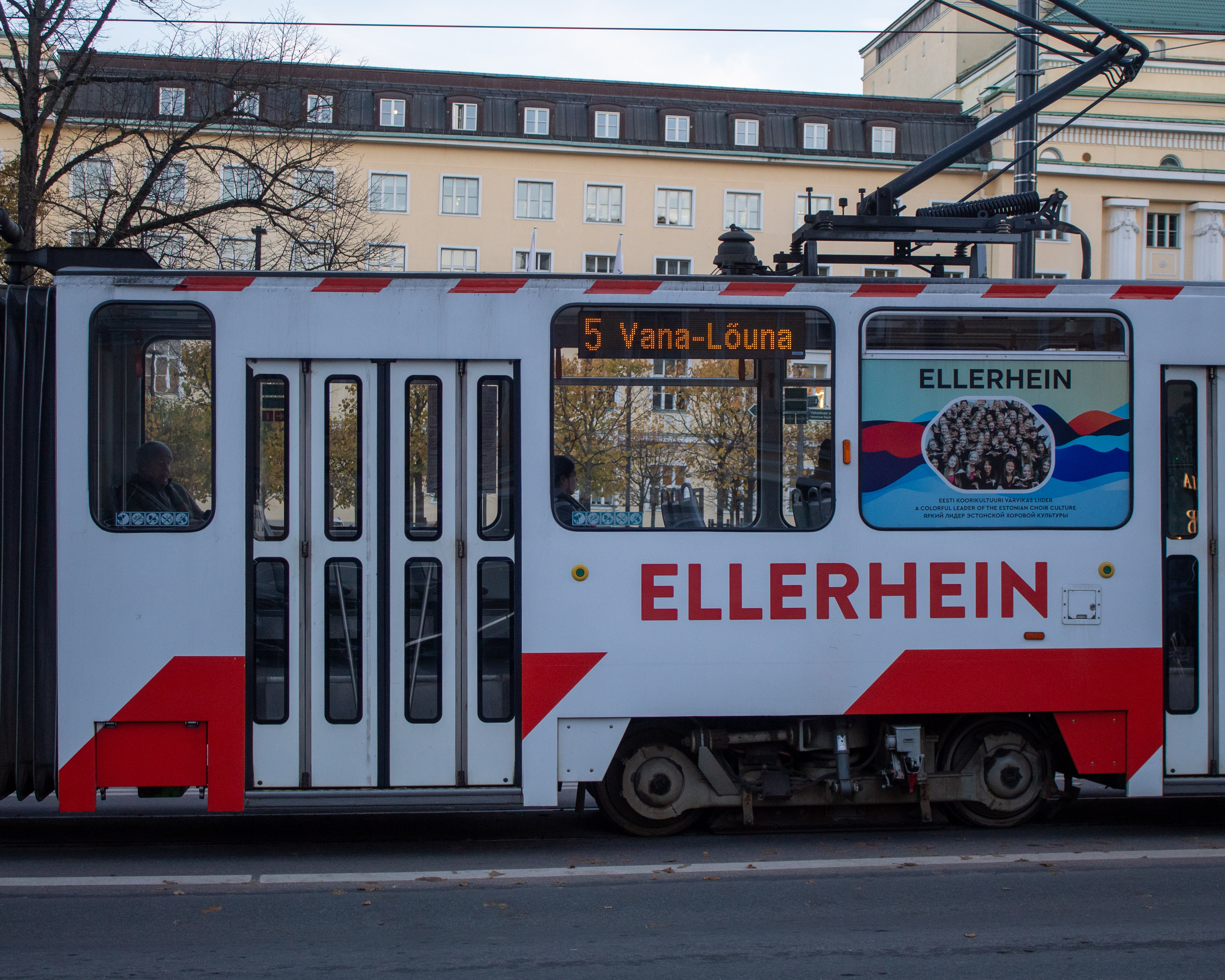
The name and a brief description of the Ellerhein choir are displayed on the side of their namesake tram.

This section lists the dates on which each named tram entered service, and whom they are named after:

- 10 September 2018 – Neeme – conductor Neeme Järvi
- 2 November 2018 – Anne – singer Anne Veski
- 30 November 2018 – Smilers – the band Smilers
- 18 January 2019 – Heino – melodeon maker and player Heino Tartes
- 22 February 2019 – Alo – composer Alo Mattiisen
- 21 March 2019 – Georg – singer Georg Ots
- 17 April 2019 – Raimond – composer and musician Raimond Valgre
- 3 May 2019 – Jaak – singer Jaak Joala
- 14 May 2019 – Peeter – conductor Peeter Saul
- 7 June 2019 – Eri – conductor Eri Klas
- 18 June 2019 – Ellerhein – Ellerhein children's choir
- 3 July 2019 – Gustav – choir director and composer Gustav Ernesaks

In August 2023 the folk group Curly Strings were also commemorated with a tram in their name, in the lead-up to their 10th anniversary as a band.

== Concerts and Performances ==
Various concerts have been performed in these trams, the most notable being the concerts held on International Music Day 2019.

On 5 December 2019, there was also a set of impromptu acting performances in the trams, called TRAMWARM, where students from the Estonian Academy of Arts set up regular household scenes in tram cars using household furniture and items, in a bid to encourage passengers to view their tram journeys differently.
