= Trams in Frankfurt =

Trams in Frankfurt May refer to:

- Trams in Frankfurt am Main
- Trams in Frankfurt (Oder)
