= Schöneiche bei Berlin tramway =

Tramway in Schöneiche, near Berlin, Germany

Operation
- Locale: Schöneiche, Rüdersdorf
- Open: 1910
- Status: open
- Lines: 1
- Operator: Schöneicher – Rüdersdorf Strassenbahn GmbH

Infrastructure
- Track gauge: 1,000 mm (3 ft 3 3/8 in) metre gauge
- Propulsion system: Electric

Statistics
- Route length: 14.1 km
- Approx. 3,400 per day
Overview
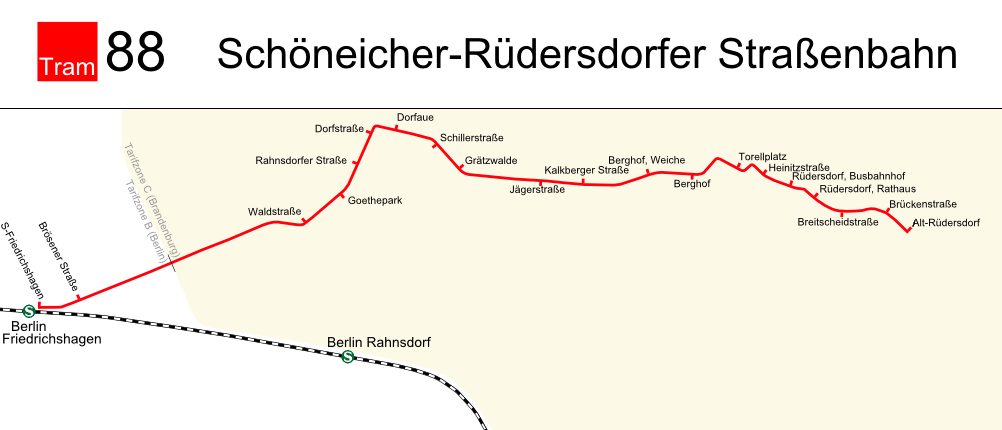
- Website: http://www.srs-tram.de/

The Schöneiche bei Berlin tramway is an interurban tramway running from Friedrichshagen S-Bahn station to the towns of Schöneiche bei Berlin and Rüdersdorf, to the east of Berlin.

== Route ==
The route starts at the Friedrichshagen S-Bahn station, located on line S3. It also connects to lines 60 and 61 of the Berlin trams here. It then runs alongside Schöneicher Landstraße, before diverging from the road, and entering Brandenburg, and the town of Schöneiche. It then runs on street, through Kirschenstraße and Puschkinstraße, before passing the depot, at which point it returns to a single track running alongside Dorfstraße. It then makes a 90 degree turn at a roundabout, and travels past the centre of Schöneiche. After leaving Schöneiche, and following Kalkberger Straße, passing under the A10 road, the line then enters the town of Rüdersdorf, terminating at a loop located at Marienstraße.

== Ticketing ==
The line is route 88 in the VBB system, with the majority of the line being located in the Berlin C fare zone. VBB tickets can be purchased that allow travel on the tramway, along with other transport in the VBB scheme. For passengers only travelling on the tram, the line also sells single, 10 journey, and monthly tickets, only valid on the tram. For these tickets the line is divided into three zones: Berlin, Schöneiche, and Rüdersdorf.

== Rolling stock ==
The tramway currently operates four types of vehicle in regular use.

The oldest vehicles in use are four Düwag GT6 trams, purchased from Heidelberg. These were originally built in 1966 and 1973, and do not provide low floor access.

The fleet also includes three Tatra KT4DNF trams purchased from Cottbus and Szeged, which originally were built in 1987 and 1990. These do provide low floor access to the middle section of the tramcar.

In 2018 the tramway purchased two prototype Transtech Artic low-floor articulated trams from Helsinki. Tram 51 (Helsinki No. 401) entered service in September 2018. Tram 52 (Helsinki No. 402) was delivered in early 2019. The first entirely low floor service was operated on May 1, 2019. A third Artic-Tram, numbered 53 (newly built for the Schöneiche-Rudersdorf tramway), entered service on March 25, 2020.

In December 2022 two Stadtbahnwagen M trams were bought from the Ruhrbahn. These had previously operated on the Mülheim tram network and had been modified with the addition of a low-floor centre section.

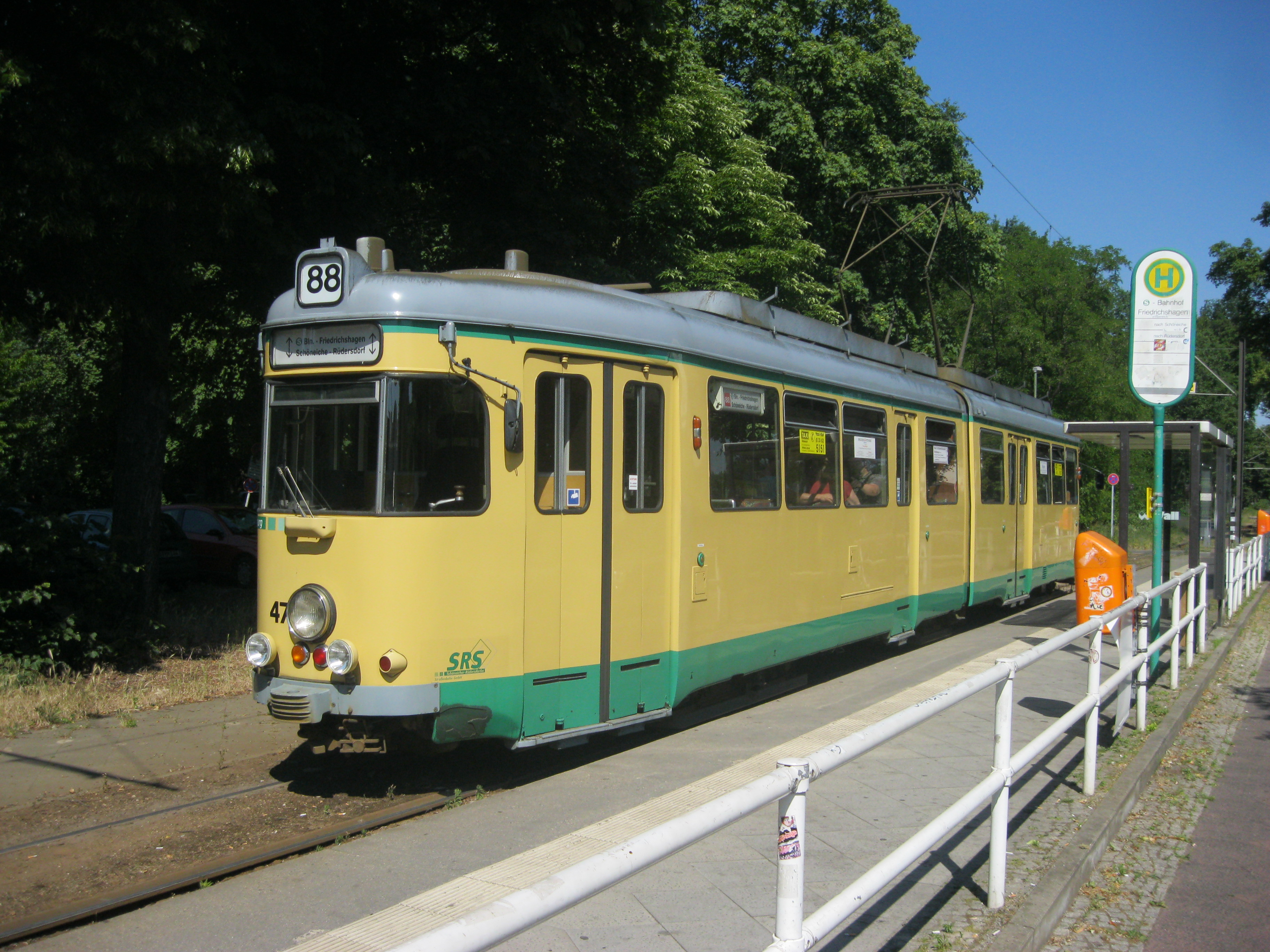
GT6 in June 2011

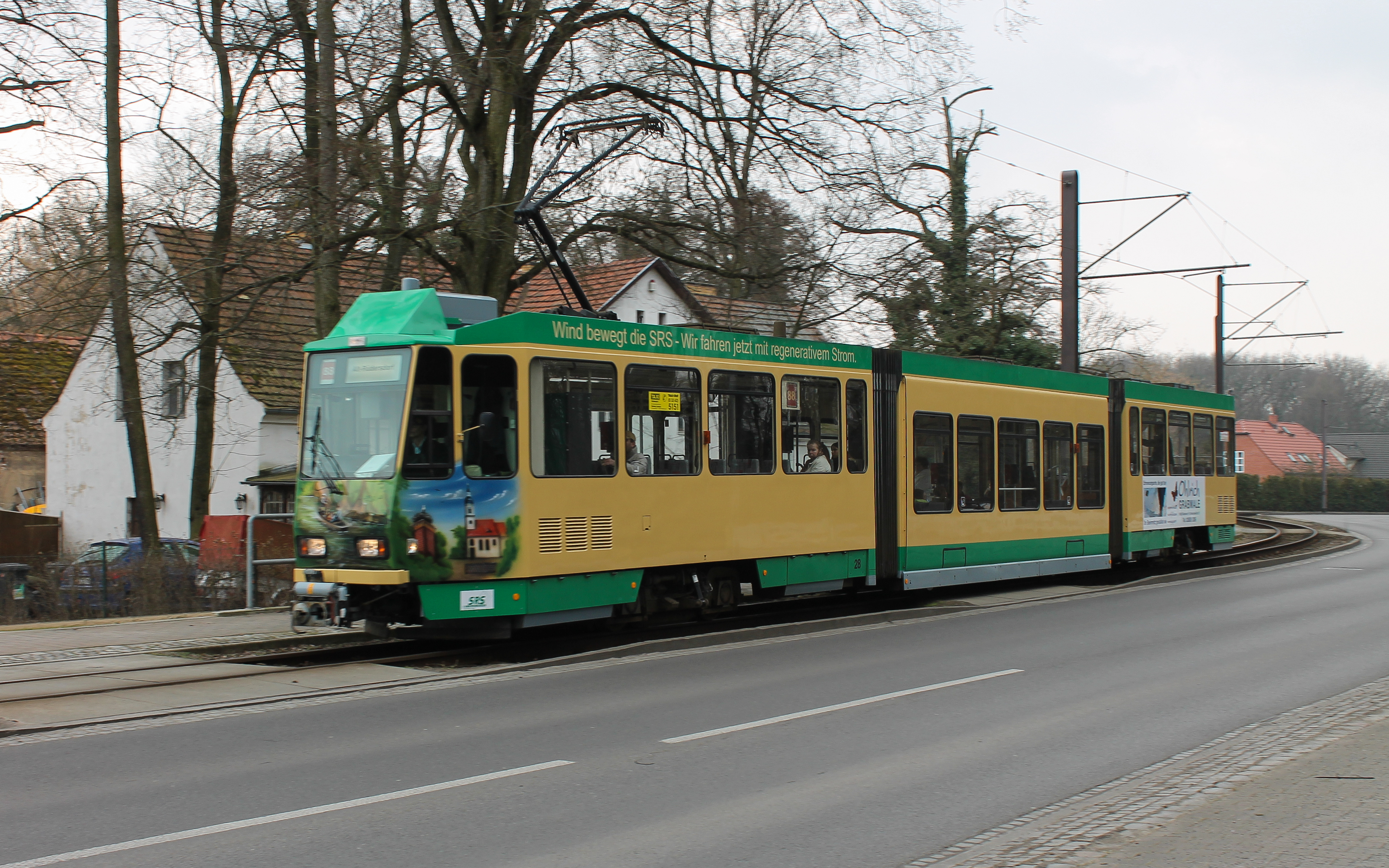
Tatra tram in March 2014

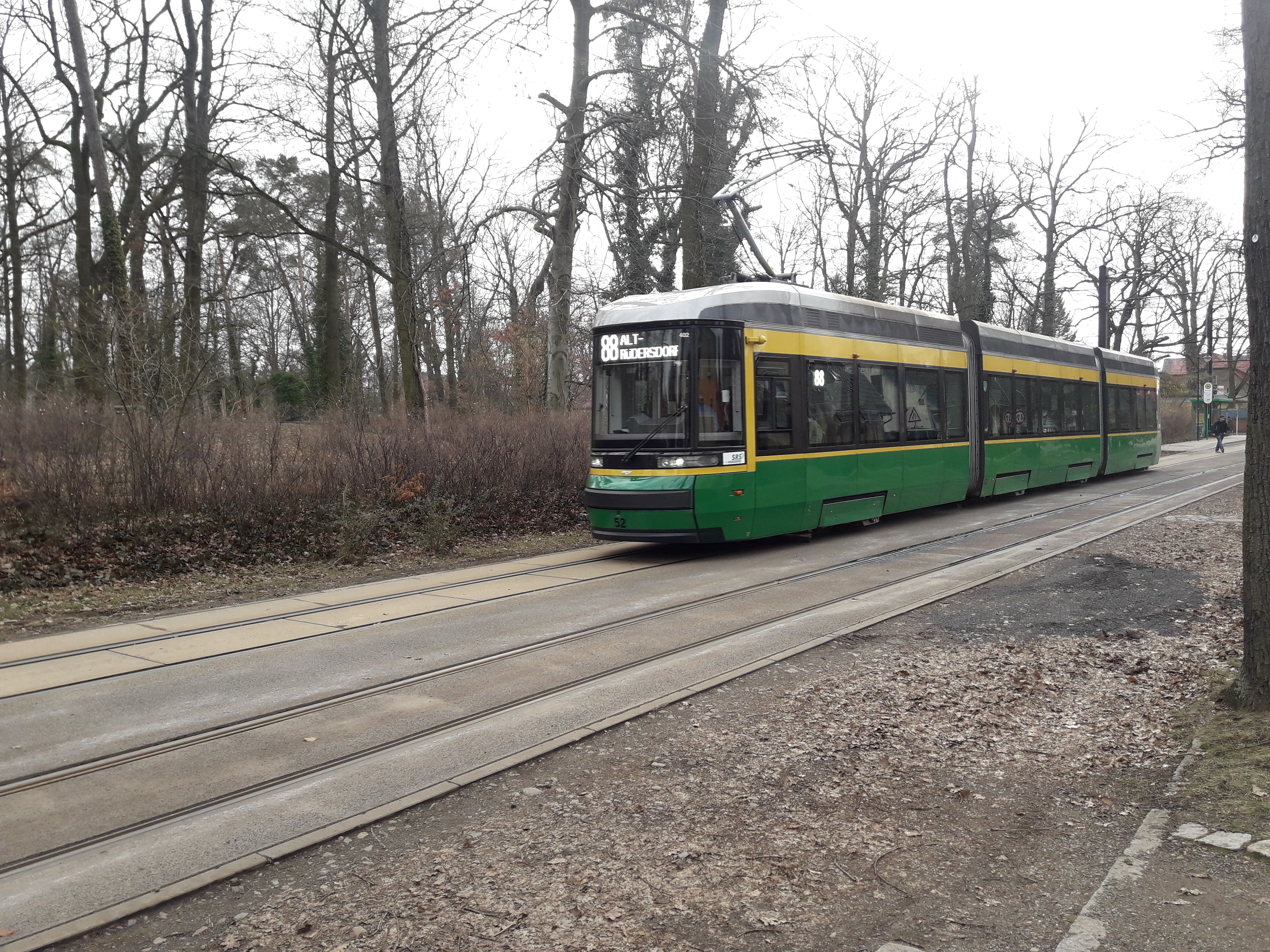
Tram 52 in February 2019
