= Tallinna Linnatranspordi AS =

Company based in Estonia

Coordinates: 59.410456°N 24.660423°E

Tallinna linnatranspordi aktsiaselts
- Type: city municipality owned corporation
- Industry: Public transportation
- Predecessor: TAK, TTTK
- Founded: 2012
- Headquarters: Tallinn, Estonia
- Area served: Tallinn
- Website: www.tallinnlt.ee

Tallinna Linnatranspordi AS (TLT) is a transportation company owned by the city of Tallinn, Estonia. TLT is a result of the merger of Tallinn Bus Company (Tallinna Autobussikoondis) and Tallinn Tram and Trolleybus Company (Tallinna Trammi- ja Trollibussikoondis) in July 2012. The company provides bus, trolleybus, and tram services in Tallinn.

== History ==
=== Tallinn Bus Company ===
TAK was founded in 1945 as a state-owned company, under which status it operated until 1993, when it was reorganised as a public limited company owned by the City of Tallinn. Currently, the company is divided into seven operating divisions.

=== Tallinn Tram and Trolleybus Company ===
Tallinn Tram and Trolleybus Company was started in 1997 and provides transportation ever since.

=== Merger ===
Tallinn Tram and Trolleybus Company was merged with Tallinn Bus Company, and Tallinna Linnatranspordi AS officially started its operations under the new name on 18 July 2012.

At the end of 2019, the company's bus fleet has 529 buses serving 75 bus routes. TLT plans to replace all diesel buses with gas buses by 2025.

=== Logo history ===
After the Merger of the Tallinn Bus Company (TAK) and Tallinn Tram and Trolleybus Company (TTTK). Its corporate visual identity transitioned from legacy predecessor emblems to a unified brand logo introduced around 2013.

== Rolling stock ==
=== Former bus fleet ===
Tallinn's former bus network was serviced by the following fleet

Class	Image	Top speed		Length metres	Capacity			In service	Routes operated	Built	Years operated
Class	Image	mph	km/h	Length metres	Std	Sdg	Total	In service	Routes operated	Built	Years operated
Scania CL94UA		40	65	18.11	36	133	169	5	Lines 1 and 5	1979–1990	1981–present
Scania L94UB		40	65	26.77	55	191	246	12	All lines	2001–2004	2001–present
Total								66			

=== Current bus fleet ===
Tallinn's bus network is currently serviced by the following fleet

Class	Image	Top speed		Length metres	Capacity			In service	Routes operated	Built	Years operated
Class	Image	mph	km/h	Length metres	Std	Sdg	Total	In service	Routes operated	Built	Years operated
Solaris Urbino IV 12		40	65	18.11	36	133	169	5	Lines 1 and 5	1979–1990	2020–present
Solaris Urbino IV 18		40	65	26.77	55	191	246	12	All lines	2001–2004	2020–present
MAN A40 Lion's City		53	85	18,75	61	110	171	55	All lines	2013–2017	2013–present
MAN A78 Lion's City		43	70	31	79	140	219	20	All lines	2011–2015	2015–present
Volvo 7900		37	60	18.11	33	136	169	6	Regularly on line 1 and 5 (Line 3 previously)	2016–2018	2017–present
Solaris Urbino 12 electric		50	80	28.6	65	244	309	23	All lines	2022–2025	2024–present
BMC Procity II 12LF											2026–present
Total								66			

=== Current tram fleet ===
Tallinn's tram network is currently serviced by the following fleet:

Class	Image	Top speed		Length metres	Capacity			In service	Routes operated	Built	Years operated
Class	Image	mph	km/h	Length metres	Std	Sdg	Total	In service	Routes operated	Built	Years operated
Tatra KT4 (including KT4D, KT4SU, KT4TM^{a})		40	65	18.11	36	133	169	5	Lines 1 and 5	1979–1990	1981–present
Tatra KT6TM		40	65	26.77	55	191	246	12	All lines	2001–2004	2001–present
CAF Urbos AXL		43	70	31	79	140	219	20	All lines	2011–2015	2015–present
Tatra KT4TMR		37	60	18.11	33	136	169	6	Regularly on line 1 and 5 (Line 3 previously)	2016–2018	2017–present
Pesa Twist 147N		50	80	28.6	65	244	309	23	All lines	2022–2025	2024–present
Total								66			
Notes: a D: German model; SU: Soviet model; TM: modernised units

=== History and former tram fleet ===
Following the start of electrification in 1931, the first electric tram cars were assembled in Tallinn using parts and sub-assemblies from Germany and Sweden. The first snow-plow came from Sweden in 1930. By 1940 the system was operating with 54 tramcars, of which 20 were electrically powered and nine were still petrol/gasoline powered. The other 28 were unpowered trailer units. Between 1951 and 1954 15 powered tramcars were assembled in the Tallinn depot along with 23 unpowered trailer cars.

==== Gotha tram units ====
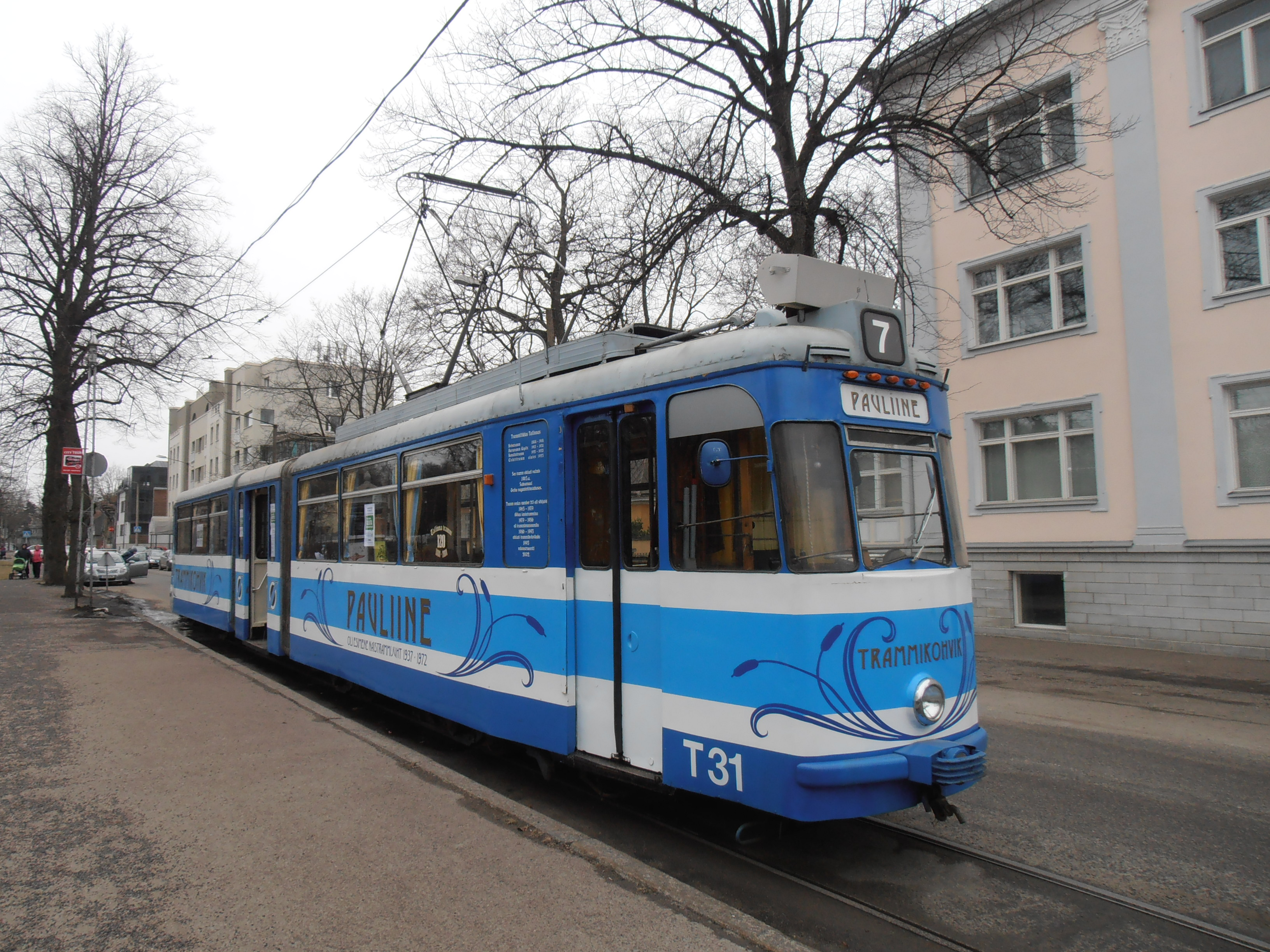
The now-refurbished "Pauliine" Gotha G4 tram, in use as a café

Between 1955 and 1964, 50 powered tramcars and 50 further unpowered trailer cars were delivered from the Gothaer Waggonfabrik rolling stock production facility in southern GDR (East Germany). Between 1965 and 1967, more Gotha G4 "bendy-tram" (hinged) tramcars were added to the fleet. Use of the Gotha G4 units continued until 1988.

One Gotha G4 has survived, and is said to be the only intact unit in the world that can still be operated. In 1990, it was converted into a café and christened "Pauliine", after Tallinn's first female tram driver. The café ceased operation in 2017, and the tram was subsequently left disused for eight years. In 2025, the tram underwent a comprehensive renovation, whereby most of its original features were restored and a new red livery was painted. The café table layout was left unchanged. It remains too old for daily use, and can now be rented for private events.

==== Tatra tram units ====
In 1973, Tallinn switched suppliers to ČKD Tatra of Prague in Western Czechoslovakia.

By 1990, 60 Tatra T4 trams and 73 Tatra KT4 trams had entered service on the Tallinn network.

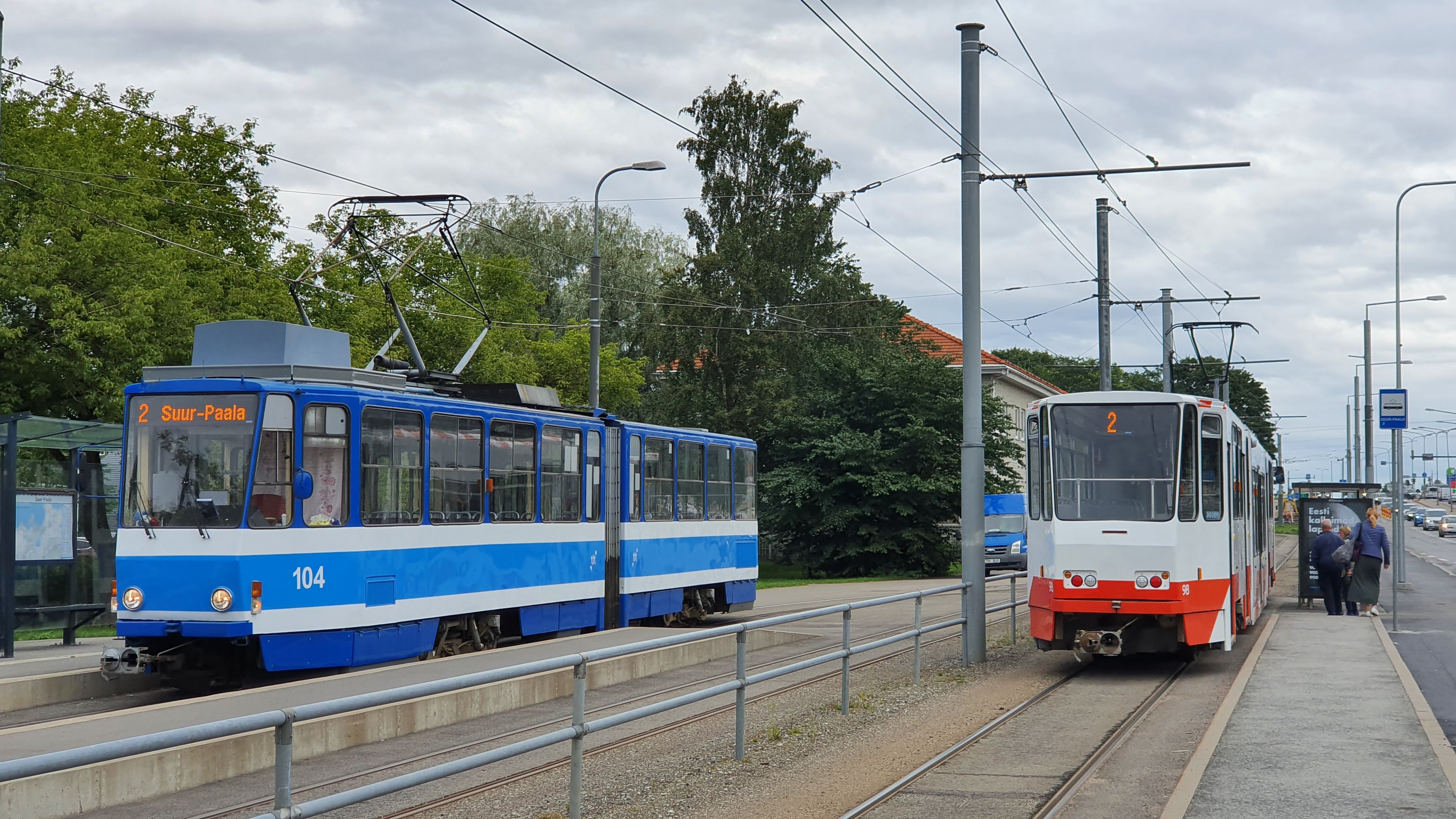
Tatra KT4SU (left) in old blue livery and Tatra KT4DTM at Suur-Paala

After Estonia regained independence in 1991, procurement was focused on second-hand Tatra units. 13 KT4 trams came from the city of Gera, 6 from Cottbus, 16 from Erfurt and 1 from Frankfurt (Oder). In 2001, work had commenced on converting the KT4 fleet into KT6TM units through the addition of a low-floor middle-car. Whilst the use of two-section T4 vehicles came to an end in 2005, the T4-based KT4 and KT6TM trams were the only trams running in Tallinn until the mid-2010s, and remained mainstays of the fleet into the 2020s.

From the early 2000s, there has also been a focus on enhanced maintenance schedules and the use of more robust replacement parts in order to extend the operating life of rolling stock from 19 to 25–30 years.

==== Trams 2010-present ====
A new generation of trams for Tallinn arrived when Estonia sold unused emissions permits worth €45 million to Spain, which specified that new, energy efficient trams be purchased in exchange. The multi-party deal involved the Spanish constructor CAF and required the delivery of 20 new, low-floor Urbos AXL trams by 2016. The first unit was delivered to the city towards the end of 2014, and was thoroughly tested and entered into service by March 2015. The trams initially only ran on line 3, but later began to operate across the entire network. The CAF Urbos trams have known design problems that have not been solved since the adoption of the trams: the noise levels from the electric motors are exceptionally high and the trams noticeably lean from side to side during braking.

Since 2018, twelve of the converted KT6TM trams have worn liveries depicting influential Estonian musical figures. Each contains the person's name and photo on the outside of the front car, and an informational panel can be found inside at the front.

There are also 6 refurbished KT4TMR 'retro' trams, bearing the names of important figures in the country's history. As with the KT6TMs, they have an information panel inside the front car. Unlike the rest of the fleet, these trams use wooden benches placed in a longitudinal configuration.

Since 2024, Pesa Twist trams have also been operating on the system.

== See also ==
- Public transport in Tallinn
- Trams in Tallinn
- Transport in Estonia
