= Trams in Brandenburg an der Havel =

Tram system in Brandenburg an der Havel, Germany

Brandenburg an der Havel tramway network
- Straßenbahn Brandenburg an der Havel
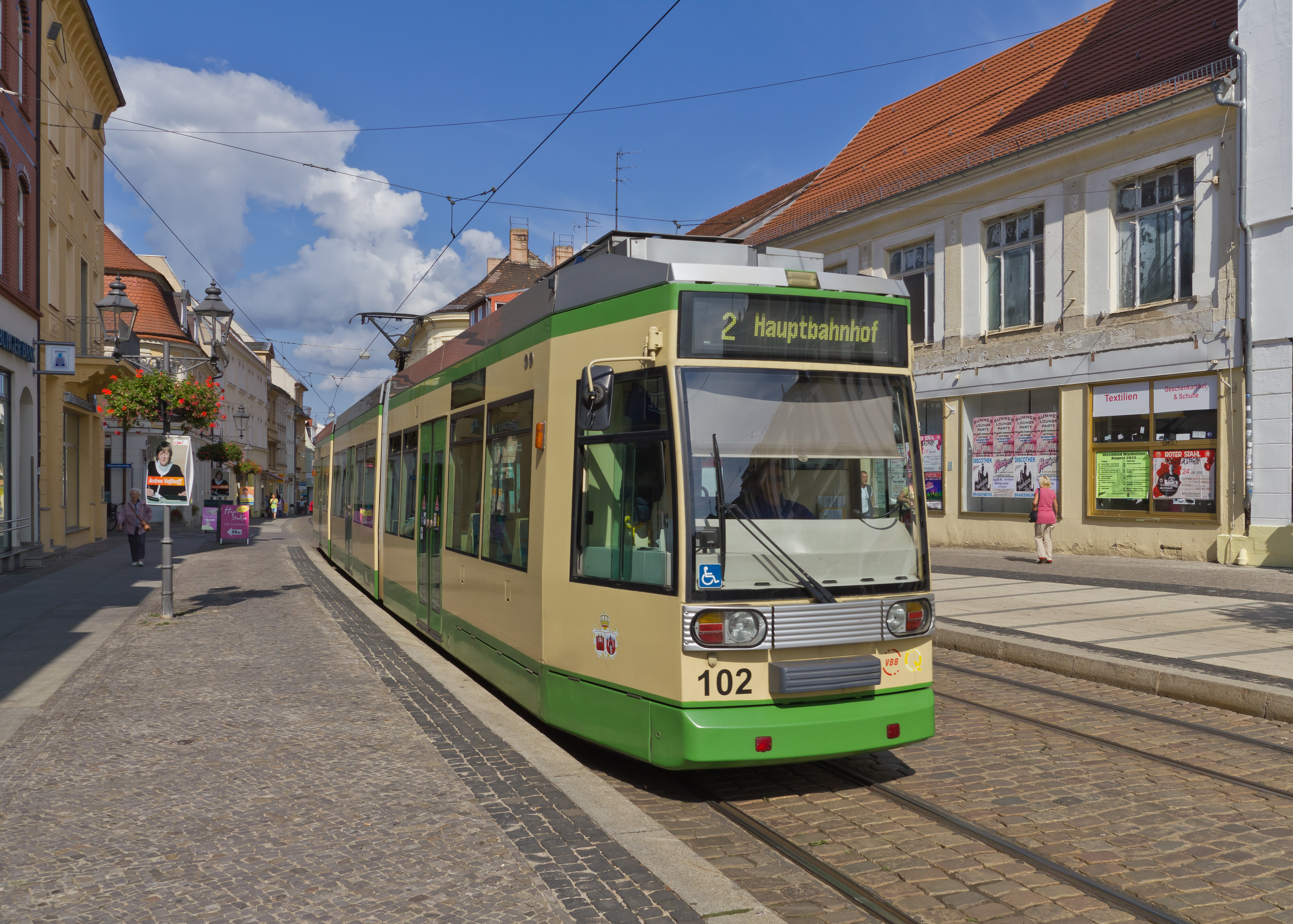
- An MGT6D tram in Brandenburg an der Havel, 2013

Operation
- Locale: Brandenburg an der Havel, Brandenburg, Germany

Statistics
Horsecar era: 1897–1911
- Status: Converted to electricity
- Track gauge: 1,000 mm (3 ft 3 3/8 in)
- Propulsion system: Horses
Electric tram era: since 1911
- Status: Operational
- Lines: 2 currently in service
- Operators: Verkehrsbetriebe Brandenburg an der Havel (VBBr) (since 1990)
- Track gauge: 1,000 mm (3 ft 3 3/8 in)
- Propulsion system: Electricity
- Electrification: 600 V DC
- Track length (total): 17.6 km (10.9 mi)
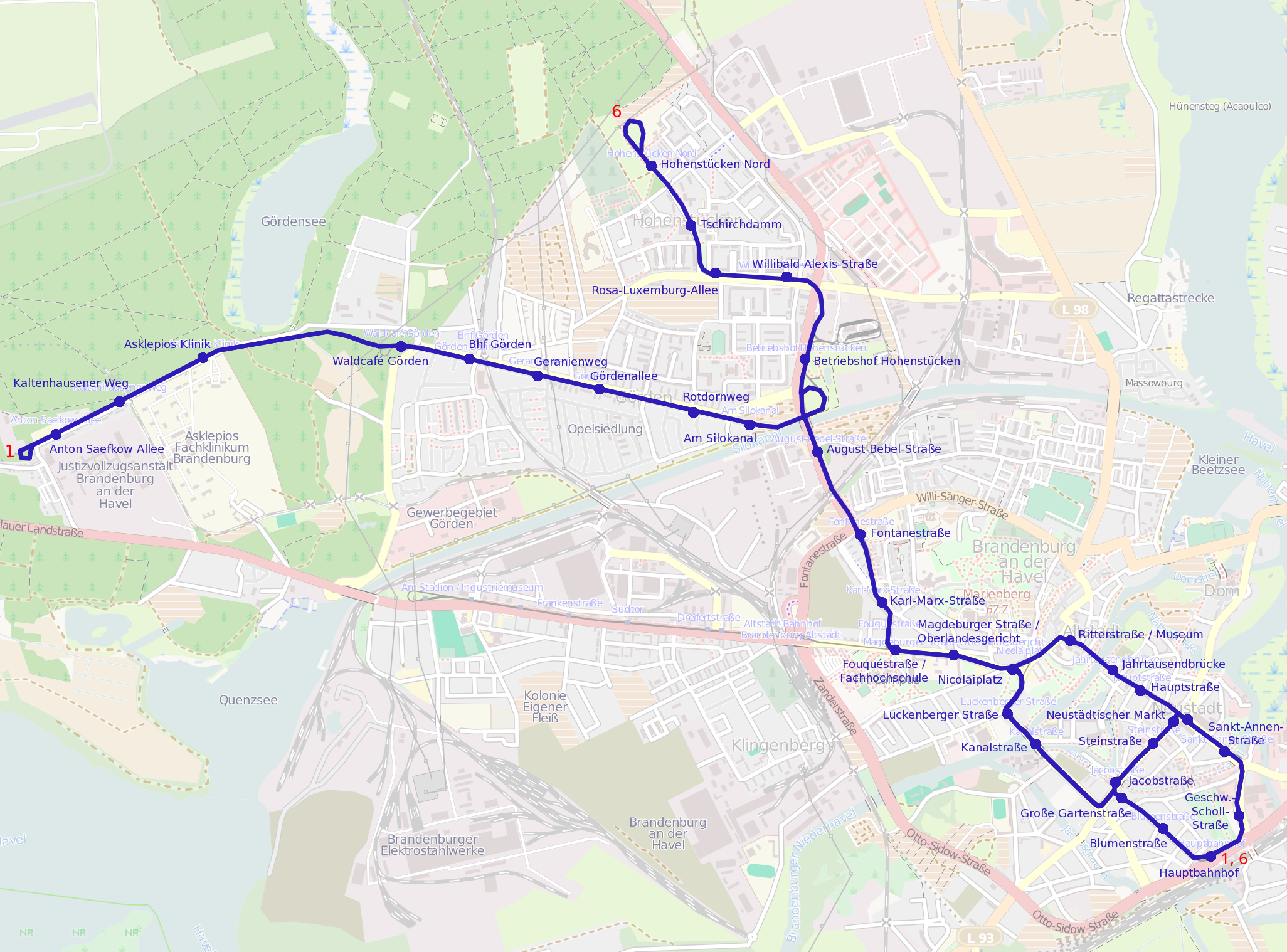
- Website: Verkehrsbetriebe Brandenburg an der Havel (in German)

The Brandenburg an der Havel tramway (German: Straßenbahn Brandenburg an der Havel) is a network of tramways forming the centrepiece of the public transport system in Brandenburg an der Havel, a city in the federal state of Brandenburg, Germany.

Opened in 1897 as a horsecar system, the network was converted to an electrically powered system in 1911. It is currently operated by Verkehrsbetriebe Brandenburg an der Havel (VBBr), and integrated in the Verkehrsverbund Berlin-Brandenburg (VBB).

== Lines ==
As of 2019, the network had four lines, as follows:

Line	Route	Stops	Notes
1	Hauptbahnhof (→ Steinstraße) ↔ Neustädtischer Markt ↔ Nicolaiplatz ↔ Fontanestraße ↔ Waldcafé Görden ↔ Anton-Saefkow-Allee	23/21	
2	Hauptbahnhof (→ Steinstraße) ↔ Neustädtischer Markt ↔ Nicolaiplatz ↔ Quenzbrücke	18/16	Currently suspended
6	Hauptbahnhof (← Steinstraße) ↔ Neustädtischer Markt ↔ Nicolaiplatz ↔ Fontanestraße ↔ Hohenstücken Nord	18/20	
1/2	Anton-Saefkow-Allee ↔ Fontanestraße ↔ Quenzbrücke	20	Currently suspended. Replaced lines 1 and 2 on Sundays and public holidays.

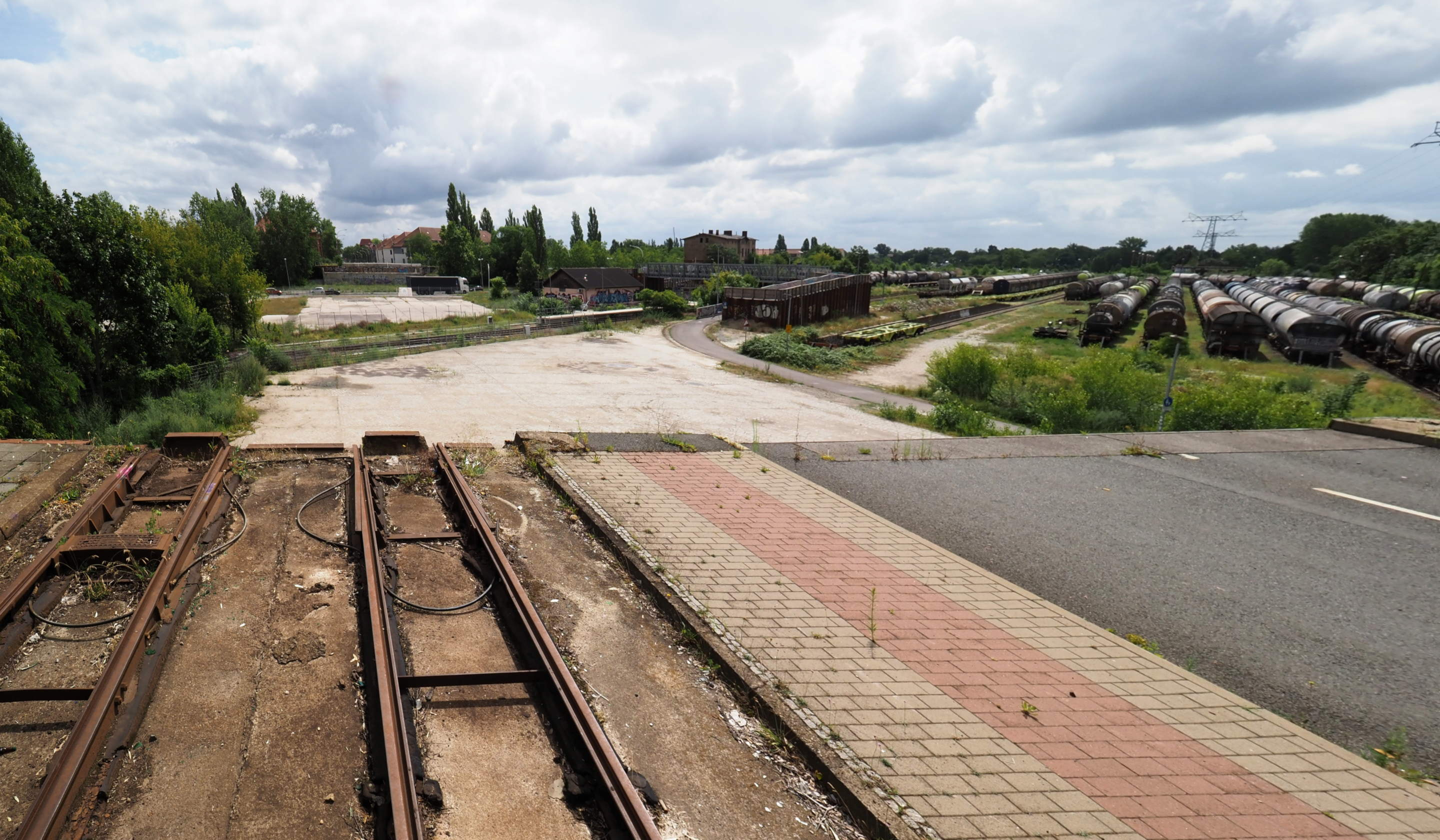
Line 2 is disrupted since 2019 by the demolished Bridge of the 20th anniversary of the GDR

Since 6 December 2019 only lines 1 and 6 have been in operation due to structural problems with the Bridge of the 20th anniversary of the GDR, where the tram line to Quenzbrücke crosses the railway line towards Rathenow at Brandenburg Altstadt station.

== Rolling Stock ==
As of 2024 the rolling stock fleet consisted of two Tatra KT4, ten KTNF6 and six Düwag MGT6D. The KTNF6 were rebuilt from KT4D vehicles between 1997 and 1999 with an extra low-floor centre section. The two remaining KT4D trams serve as reserve vehicles.

A procurement project for new trams was started in 2018, jointly with Cottbus and Frankfurt (Oder), and a contract was awarded to Škoda Transportation in 2020. Brandenburg will receive eight new trams with an option for four more. The first of the new trams was delivered on 18 December 2024.

The new trams are designated ForCity Plus 48T by the manufacturer and are three-section unidirectional vehicles with a length of 28.96 m and a width of 2.3 m. They have two fully-rotating traction bogies, one under each of the end sections, and a fixed trailer bogie under the central section. The trams are 70% low-floor and have a total capacity of 151 passengers, including 50 seats.

== See also ==
- List of town tramway systems in Germany
- Trams in Germany

== Bibliography ==
- Bauer, Gerhard; Kuschinski, Norbert (1995). Die Straßenbahnen in Ostdeutschland [The Tramways in East Germany]. Vol. Band 3: Berlin, Brandenburg, Mecklenburg-Vorpommern [Volume 3: Berlin, Brandenburg, Mecklenburg-Vorpommern]. Aachen, Germany: Schweers + Wall. ISBN 3921679818.
- Autorenkollektiv (1986). Straßenbahn Archiv 6. Raum Cottbus, Magdeburg, Schwerin, Rostock [Tramway Archive 6. Cottbus, Magdeburg, Schwerin, Rostock region] (in German). Berlin: transpress VEB Verlag für Verkehrswesen. ISBN 3-344-00003-9.
- Menzel, Walter; Schulze, Jörg (2011). 100 Jahre elektrische Straßenbahn in Brandenburg an der Havel [One Hundred Years of Electric Trams in Brandenburg an der Havel] (in German). Berlin: VBN Verlag Bernd Neddermeyer. ISBN 978-3-941712-13-3.
- Schwandl, Robert (2012). Schwandl's Tram Atlas Deutschland (in German and English) (3rd ed.). Berlin: Robert Schwandl Verlag. pp. 22–23. ISBN 9783936573336.
