= Walls of Tallinn =

Historic wall built around the city of Tallinn

Walls of Tallinn (Tallinn City Wall)
- Tallinna linnamüür (Estonian)
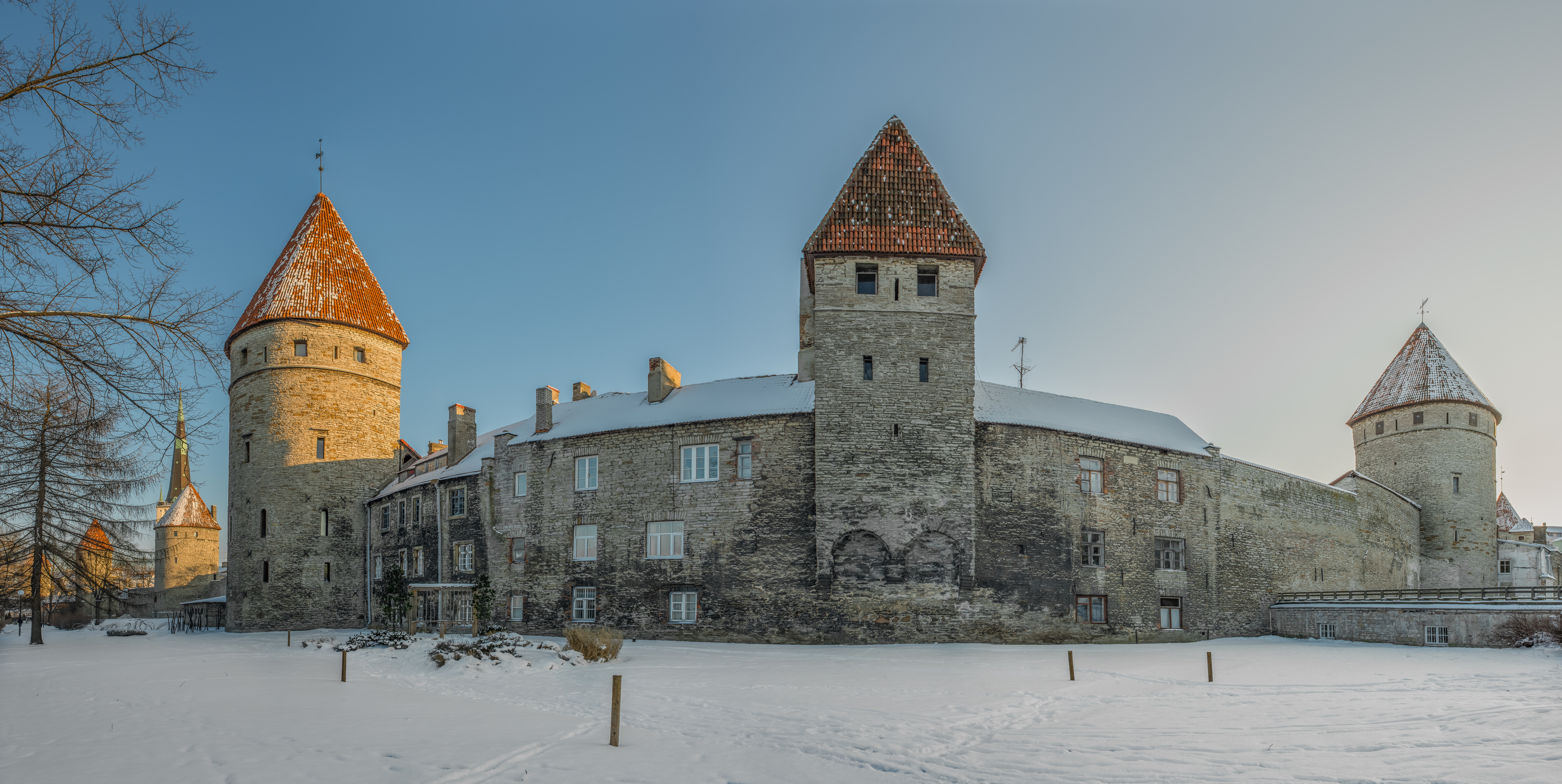
- Tallinn City Wall
- Interactive map of Walls of Tallinn (Tallinn City Wall)
- Location: Tallinn, Estonia

History
- Founded: 13th century
- Built for: Defense for the City of Tallinn

Site notes
- Architectural style: Medieval city wall

UNESCO World Heritage Site
- Official name: Historic Centre (Old Town) of Tallinn
- Type: Cultural
- Criteria: ii, iv
- Designated: 1997 (21st session)
- Reference no.: 822
- Europe and North America
- http://whc.unesco.org/en/list/822

The Walls of Tallinn are the medieval defensive walls constructed around the city of Tallinn in Estonia.

== History ==
The first wall around Tallinn was ordered to be constructed by Margaret Sambiria in 1265 resulting in its name, the 'Margaret Wall.' This wall was less than 5 metres (16 ft) tall and about 1.5 metres (4.9 ft) thick at its base. Since that time it has been enlarged and strengthened. The walls and the many gates are still largely extant today. This is one of the reasons that Tallinn's old town became a World Heritage Site. The walls were enlarged in the fourteenth century, and citizens of Tallinn were required to turn out for guard duty, which meant to wear their armour and demonstrate their readiness to face invaders.

== Objects in the city wall ==
Name	Image	Notes	Location	Coordinates
Long Leg Gate Tower (Pika jala väravatorn)			Pikk jalg	59°26′15.87″N 24°44′34.33″E
Tower behind Almshouse (Seegitagune torn)		demolished in the 19th century	Nunne 3	
Tower behind Sauna (Saunatagune torn)		partially extant	Nunne 9 / Nunne 11A	
Nun's Gate (Nunnavärav)		Demolished in 1868.	Nunne	
Nun's Tower (Nunnatorn)			Väike-Kloostri 1	59°26′21.41″N 24°44′32.55″E
Monastery Gate (Kloostrivärav)		end of 19th century	Suur-Kloostri	59°26′22.01″N 24°44′32.51″E
Sauna Tower (Saunatorn)			Suur-Kloostri 18	59°26′22.63″N 24°44′32.49″E
Golden Leg Tower (Kuldjala torn)			Gümnaasiumi 1A	59°26′24.11″N 24°44′33.25″E
Tower behind Nuns (Nunnadetagune torn)			Kooli 1	59°26′25.39″N 24°44′34.27″E
Loewenschede Tower (Loewenschede torn)			Kooli 7	59°26′26.18″N 24°44′35.99″E
Lippe Tower (Lippe torn)		destroyed	Kooli 9	
passage beside Lippe Tower		Built 1933	Laboratooriumi 21	59°26′26.5″N 24°44′38.85″E
Rope Hill Tower (Köismäe torn)			Laboratooriumi 27	59°26′27.4″N 24°44′41.67″E
breakthrough of Suurtüki street		19th century	Suurtüki	59°26′28.24″N 24°44′43.48″E
Plate Tower (Plate torn)			Laboratooriumi 29	59°26′28.63″N 24°44′43.98″E
Epping Tower (Eppingi torn)			Laboratooriumi 31	59°26′29.82″N 24°44′46.2″E
Tower behind Grusbeke (Grusbeke-tagune torn)			Laboratooriumi 33	59°26′31.22″N 24°44′48.62″E
Renten Tower (Renteni torn)		lower part extant inside a later building	Lai 49	
Tower behind Wulfard (Wulfardi-tagune torn)		lower part extant	Tolli 4	59°26′32.3″N 24°44′53.97″E
Great Coastal Gate (Suur Rannavärav)			Pikk 70	59°26′33.23″N 24°44′57.44″E
Fat Margaret (Paks Margareeta)			Pikk 70	59°26′33.3″N 24°44′58.72″E
Stolting Tower (Stoltingi torn)			Pikk 68	59°26′31.78″N 24°44′58.62″E
Tower behind Hattorpe (Hattorpe-tagune torn)			Pikk 62	59°26′29.5″N 24°44′57.6″E
tower near the former Russian church		destroyed	Sulevimägi	
Small Coastal Gate (Väike Rannavärav)		destroyed		
Bremen Tower (Bremeni torn)			Vene 28	59°26′21.86″N 24°44′57″E
Bremen Passage (Bremeni käik)		19th century	Bremeni käik	59°26′21.54″N 24°44′57.15″E
Tower behind Monks (Munkadetagune torn)			Müürivahe 58	59°26′18.46″N 24°44′58.89″E
Helleman Tower (Hellemani torn)			Müürivahe 48	59°26′15.15″N 24°44′59.82″E
Viru Gate (Viru värav)			Viru	59°26′11.87″N 24°45′1.31″E
Hinke Tower (Hinke torn)			Pärnu mnt 2 / Müürivahe 32	59°26′9.55″N 24°44′57.98″E
Düvelsmoder Tower / Devil's Mother's Tower (Düvelsmoderi torn / Kuradiema torn)		demolished in 1882	Väike-Karja/Müürivahe	
Lurenburg Artillery Tower (Lurenburgi suurtükitorn)		Built 1538–1554, demolished in 1767 during the expansion of the bastion systems.	Pärnu mnt 7	
Cattle Gate (Karjavärav)		Built 1456, demolished in 1849 to widen the streets. Was used to transport cattle between the city and pastures.		
Assauwe Tower (Assauwe torn)			Müürivahe 12	59°26′5.61″N 24°44′43.33″E
Harju Gate (Harju värav)	The main gate after the demolition of the front gates.	Mentioned in 1361, 1448–1453 the second front gate was built. In 1862 the front gates were demolished and in 1875 the main gate.	Harju	59°26′4.74″N 24°44′37.53″E
Goat Tower (Kitsetorn)			Rüütli	
Kiek in de Kök			Komandandi tee 2	59°26′5.14″N 24°44′29″E
Maiden's Tower (Neitsitorn)			Lossi plats 11 / Lühike jalg 9A	59°26′6.8″N 24°44′27.51″E
Stable Tower (Tallitorn)			Lossi plats 11 / Lühike jalg 9A	59°26′8.43″N 24°44′26.91″E
breakthrough from Toompea to Danish King's Garden			Lühike jalg	59°26′8.9″N 24°44′27.14″E
Short Leg Gate Tower (Lühikese jala väravatorn)			Lühike jalg 9	59°26′10.01″N 24°44′28.15″E
Dome Gate (Toomvärav)		demolished in 1860.		

== Tram services ==
Services at Suur Rannavärav
Preceding station	Trams in Tallinn	Following station
Kanuti towards Kadriorg	1	Põhja puiestee towards Kopli
Linnahall towards Suur-Paala	2	Põhja puiestee towards Kopli
Kanuti towards Vana-Lõuna	5	Põhja puiestee towards Kopli
