= Trams in Cottbus =

Tram system in Cottbus, Brandenburg, Germany

Coordinates: 51°44′59″N 14°19′33″E

Cottbus tramway network
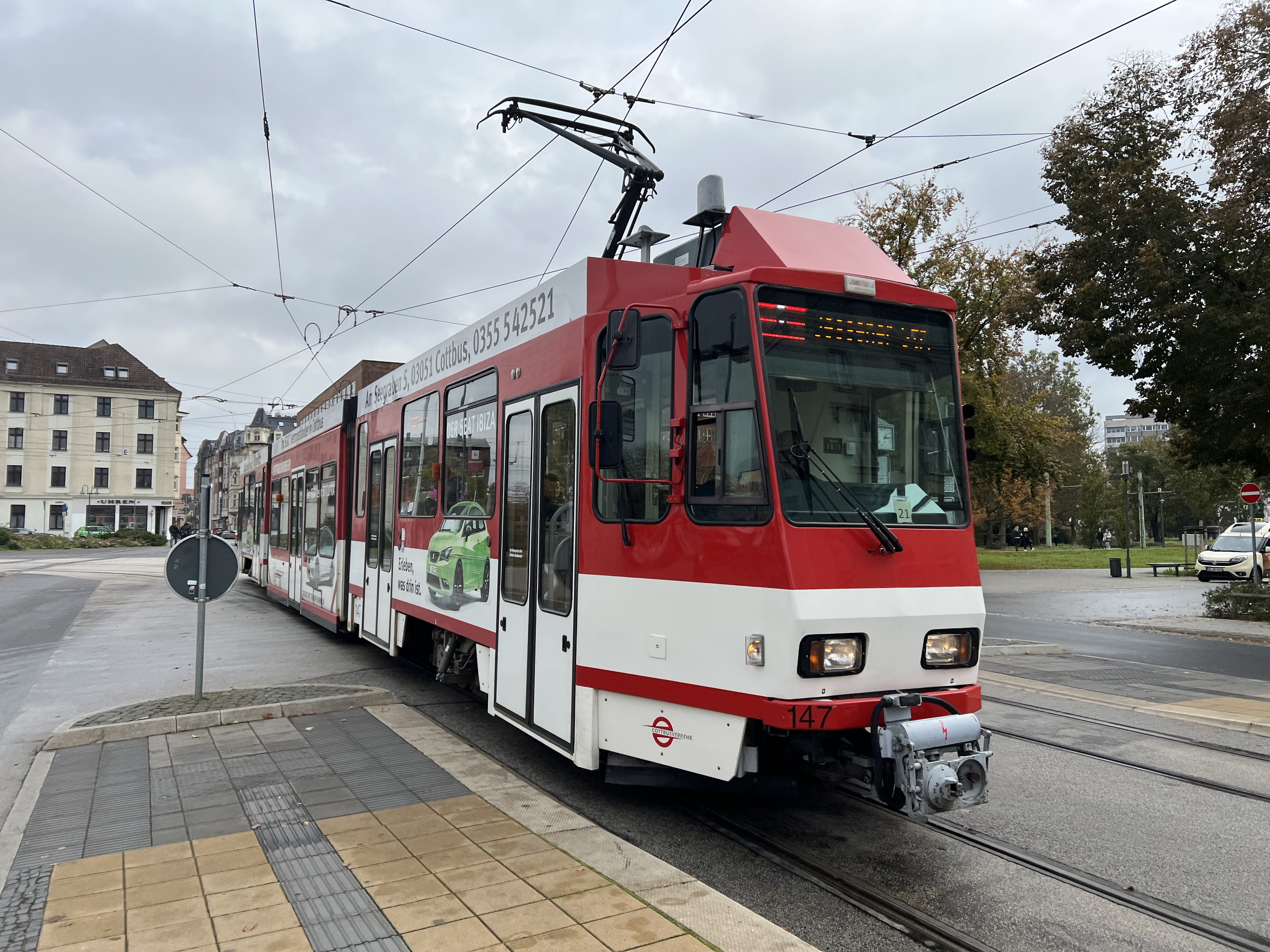
- A KTNF6 tram on line 2

Operation
- Locale: Cottbus, Brandenburg, Germany
- Open: 18 July 1903
- Status: Operational
- Lines: 4
- Operator: Cottbusverkehr

Infrastructure
- Track gauge: 1,000 mm (3 ft 3 3/8 in)
- Propulsion system: Electricity
- Electrification: 600 V DC
- Stock: 21 KTNF6; 22 ForCity Plus 47T

Statistics
- Route length: 20.1 km (12.5 mi)
Overview
- Website: www.cottbusverkehr.de

The Cottbus tramway (German: Straßenbahn Cottbus, Lower Sorbian: Elektriska w Chóśebuzu) is a network of tramways forming the backbone of the public transport system in Cottbus, a city in the federal state of Brandenburg, Germany.

Opened in 1903, the network has been operated since 1953 by Cottbusverkehr, and is integrated in the Verkehrsverbund Berlin-Brandenburg (VBB).

== Lines ==
As of 2026 the network comprised the following four lines:

| Line | Route | Stops |
|---|---|---|
| 1 | Schmellwitz Anger / Chmjelow Najs – Stadthalle / Měsćańska hala – Stadtpromenade / Měsćańska promenada – Hauptbahnhof / Głowne dwórnišćo | 11 |
| 2 | Ströbitz / Strobice – Stadthalle / Měsćańska hala – Stadtpromenade / Měsćańska promenada – Hauptbahnhof / Głowne dwórnišćo – Jessener Straße / Jaseńska droga | 14 |
| 3 | Sandow / Žandow – Stadthalle / Měsćańska hala – Stadtmuseum / Měsćański muzej – Hauptbahnhof / Głowne dwórnišćo – Madlow / Módłej | 18 |
| 4 | Neu Schmellwitz / Nowy Chmjelow – Stadthalle / Měsćańska hala – Stadtpromenade / Měsćańska promenada – Hauptbahnhof / Głowne dwórnišćo - Sachsendorf / Knorawa | 20 |

== Rolling stock ==
=== KTNF6 ===
A fleet of 21 KTNF6 trams, built from 1981 until 1988, is operated in Cottbus. These were originally built as two-section high-floor KT4D trams were rebuilt during the 1990s with a low-floor central section and a new chopper control system. Of the 26 trams which were rebuilt 21 are still in service.

=== ForCity Plus ===
A procurement project for new trams was started in 2018, jointly with Frankfurt (Oder) and Brandenburg, and a contract was awarded to Škoda Transportation in 2020. Cottbus was originally to receive seven new trams but the order was increased in 2022 to a total of 22 vehicles. The first new tram was delivered to Cottbus in June 2024 and underwent a period of testing before entering passenger service in August 2025.

The new trams are designated ForCity Plus 47T by the manufacturer and are three-section unidirectional vehicles with a length of 28.96 m and a width of 2.4 m. They have two fully-rotating traction bogies, one under each of the end sections, and a fixed trailer bogie under the central section. The trams are 70% low-floor and have a total capacity of 158 passengers, including 61 seats.

== See also ==
- List of town tramway systems in Germany
- Trams in Germany

== Bibliography ==
- Bauer, Gerhard; Kuschinski, Norbert (1995). Die Straßenbahnen in Ostdeutschland [The Tramways in East Germany]. Vol. Band 3: Berlin, Brandenburg, Mecklenburg-Vorpommern [Volume 3: Berlin, Brandenburg, Mecklenburg-Vorpommern]. Aachen, Germany: Schweers + Wall. ISBN 3921679818.
- Schwandl, Robert (2012). Schwandl's Tram Atlas Deutschland (in German and English) (3rd ed.). Berlin: Robert Schwandl Verlag. pp. 32–33. ISBN 9783936573336.
