= Trams in Frankfurt (Oder) =

Tram system in Frankfurt (Oder), Germany

Coordinates: 52°21′N 14°33′E

- Straßenbahn Frankfurt (Oder)
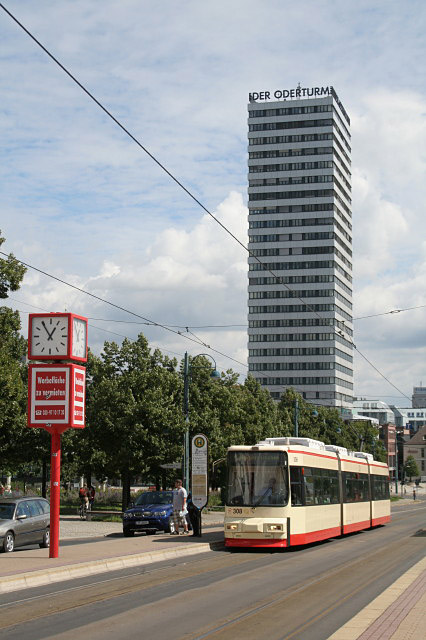
- GT6M tram in front of the Oderturm

Operation
- Locale: Frankfurt (Oder), Brandenburg, Germany
- Open: 22 January 1898
- Lines: 5
- Operator: Stadtverkehrsgesellschaft Frankfurt (Oder) (SVF)

Infrastructure
- Track gauge: 1,000 mm (3 ft 3 3/8 in)
- Propulsion system: Electricity
- Electrification: 600 V DC overhead line
- Stock: 16 KT4DM, 8 GT6M

Statistics
- Route length: 43 km (27 mi)
- Stops: 46
Overview
Frankfurt (Oder) tramway network
- Website: https://www.svf-ffo.de/ Stadtverkehrsgesellschaft mbH Frankfurt (Oder) (in German)

The Frankfurt (Oder) tramway (German: Straßenbahn Frankfurt (Oder)) is a network of tramways forming part of the public transport system in Frankfurt (Oder), a town in Brandenburg, Germany, located on the Oder River, at the German-Polish border.

Opened in 1898, the network presently consists of five lines. Since 1990 it has been operated by Stadtverkehrsgesellschaft mbH Frankfurt (Oder) (SVF), and it is integrated in the Verkehrsverbund Berlin-Brandenburg (VBB).

== Lines ==
As of 2022, the three main tram lines in Frankfurt (Oder) operated daily 4:00 to 23:30, at:

- a 20-minute headway: Monday to Friday, 6:00–19:00, and Saturday 9:00–16:00;
- a 30-minute headway: Sundays and public holidays all day (from 6:00), and Monday-Saturday before and after the period with 20-minute intervals.

Line 1 runs from the new housing development of Neuberesinchen through the city centre to the stadium.

Line 2 connects the university campuses (the main building, the auditorium and the Marion Gräfin Dönhoff building) with the speech centre in the Witzlebenstraße and extends to the fairgrounds.

Line 3 is a booster line for line 4 on weekdays. It operates Monday to Friday from the European University via the Südring to Kopernikusstraße, and, in rush hour, continues to the Technology Park and the hospital in the suburb of Markendorf (Ort) at 20-minute intervals.

Line 4, a main line, runs from the Lebus-suburb in Frankfurt's north via the railway station and the Südring, past the new solar factories, to Markendorf (Ort).

Line 5 is a tangential line - it "bypasses" the city centre, from Neuberesinchen via the station to the fairgrounds. However, it connects at Dresdener Platz or the station with lines towards the city centre. On weekdays, it is operated every 20 minutes by KT4Dms running in pairs, or a single KT4Dm, or a low-floor vehicle.

== Rolling stock ==
=== KT4DM ===
A total of 34 Tatra KT4D trams were delivered to Frankfurt between 1987 and 1990. After modernisation in 1992 these became type KT4DM and 16 were still in service as of 2021.

=== GT6M ===
In addition to the KT4DM trams SVF also operates eight GT6M low-floor trams. The first of these was delivered in 1993 and they are numbered 301-308.

=== ForCity Plus ===
To replace the KT4DM trams a procurement project was started in 2018, jointly with Cottbus and Brandenburg, and a contract was awarded to Škoda Transportation in 2020. The first of 13 new trams was delivered to Frankfurt in April 2024.

The new trams are designated ForCity Plus 46T by the manufacturer and are three-section unidirectional vehicles with a length of 28.96 m and a width of 2.3 m. They have two fully-rotating traction bogies, one under each of the end sections, and a fixed trailer bogie under the central section. The trams are 70% low-floor and have a total capacity of 151 passengers, including 51 seats.

== See also ==
- Trams in Germany
- List of town tramway systems in Germany

== Bibliography ==
- Bauer, Gerhard; Kuschinski, Norbert (1995). Die Straßenbahnen in Ostdeutschland [The Tramways in East Germany]. Vol. Band 3: Berlin, Brandenburg, Mecklenburg-Vorpommern [Volume 3: Berlin, Brandenburg, Mecklenburg-Vorpommern]. Aachen, Germany: Schweers + Wall. ISBN 3921679818.
- Schwandl, Robert (2012). Schwandl's Tram Atlas Deutschland (in German and English) (3rd ed.). Berlin: Robert Schwandl Verlag. pp. 60–61. ISBN 9783936573336.
