= Tatra KTNF6 =

Rebuilt partially low-floor tram

Tatra KTNF6/KTNF8
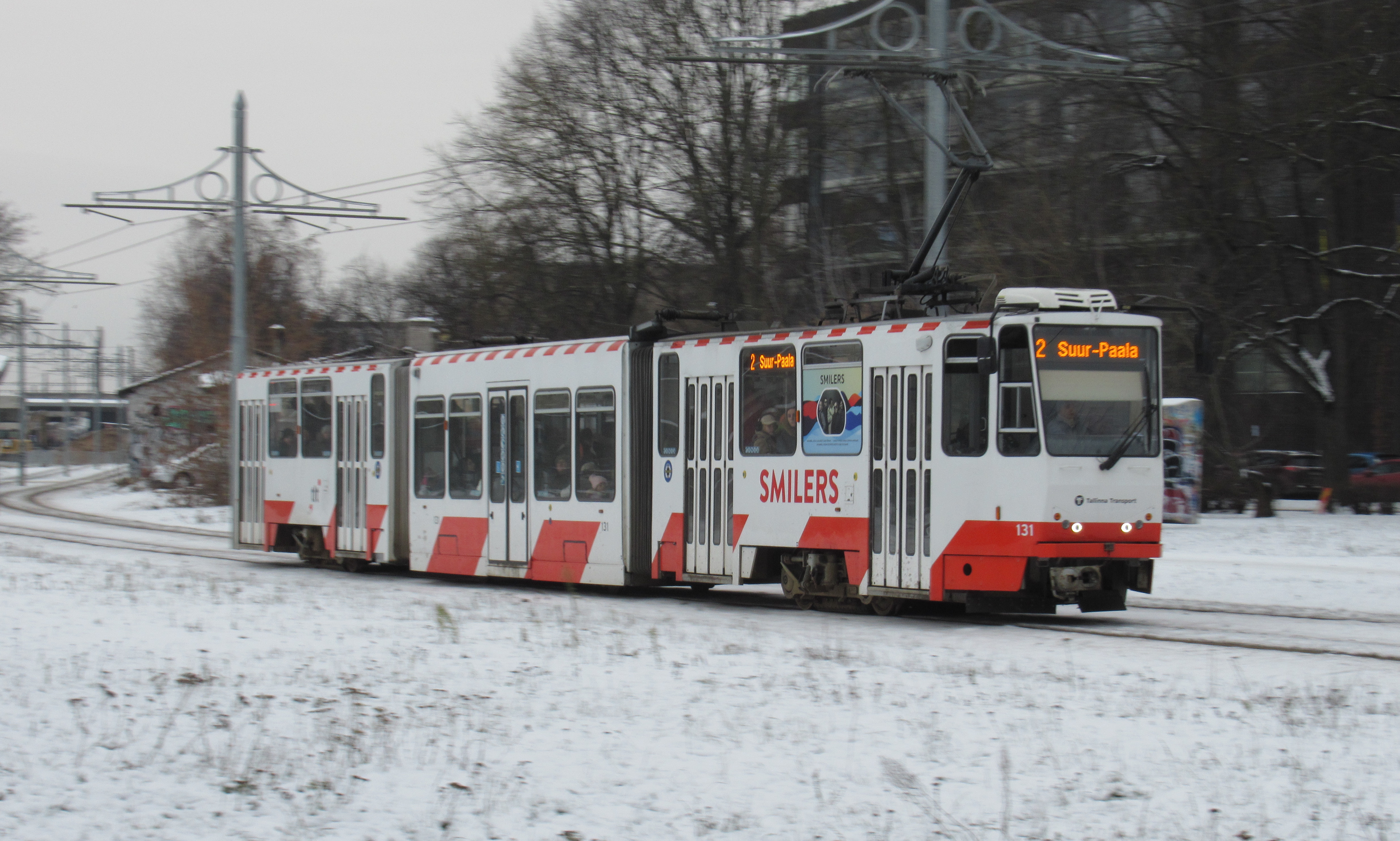
- KT6TM in Tallinn
- Manufacturer: ČKD/MGB-Mittenwalder Gerätebau (KTNF6); ČKD/Alstom (KTNF8)
- Constructed: 1996–1998 (KTNF6) 2001–2007 (KT6T); 1999–2003 (KTNF8)
- Number built: 48 (36 KTNF6 + 12 KT6T); 6 (KTNF8)
- Capacity: 54–58 (seated); 93–95 (standing)

Specifications
- Car length: 27.714 m (90 ft 11.1 in) (KTNF6); 26.554 m (87 ft 1.4 in) (KTNF8)
- Width: 2,200 mm (7 ft 3 in)
- Height: 3,400 mm (11 ft 2 in) (KTNF6); 3,560 mm (11 ft 8 in) (KTNF8)
- Floor height: 35 cm (1 ft 2 in)/90 cm (2 ft 11 in)
- Doors: 5
- Articulated sections: 3
- Maximum speed: 65 km/h (40 mph)
- Weight: 29,800 kilograms (65,700 lb)
- Power output: 4 x 54 kW (72 hp) Motors
- Bogies: Bo′+1′1′+Bo′ (KTNF6); Bo′+2′2′+Bo′ (KTNF8)
- Track gauge: 1,000 mm (3 ft 3 3/8 in); 1,067 mm (3 ft 6 in)

The Tatra KTNF6 is a modernized tram of type KT4 rebuilt with a central low-floor segment. Trams of this type are used in Cottbus, in Brandenburg an der Havel and on the Schöneiche-Rüdersdorf Tramway in Germany, and in Tallinn, Estonia, where they are called KT6TM. A similar variant of KT4 is the KTNF8, which is used in Gera, Germany.

These trams have new interiors, chairs, doors and middle sections with low floors.

The breakdown of the type designation is as follows:

- K implies articulated
- T indicates a powered vehicle
- NF for Low Floor
- 6/8 is the number of axles.

== See also ==
- Tatra KT4
