= Trams in Tallinn =

Overview of the tram network in Tallinn, Estonia

Tallinn tram network
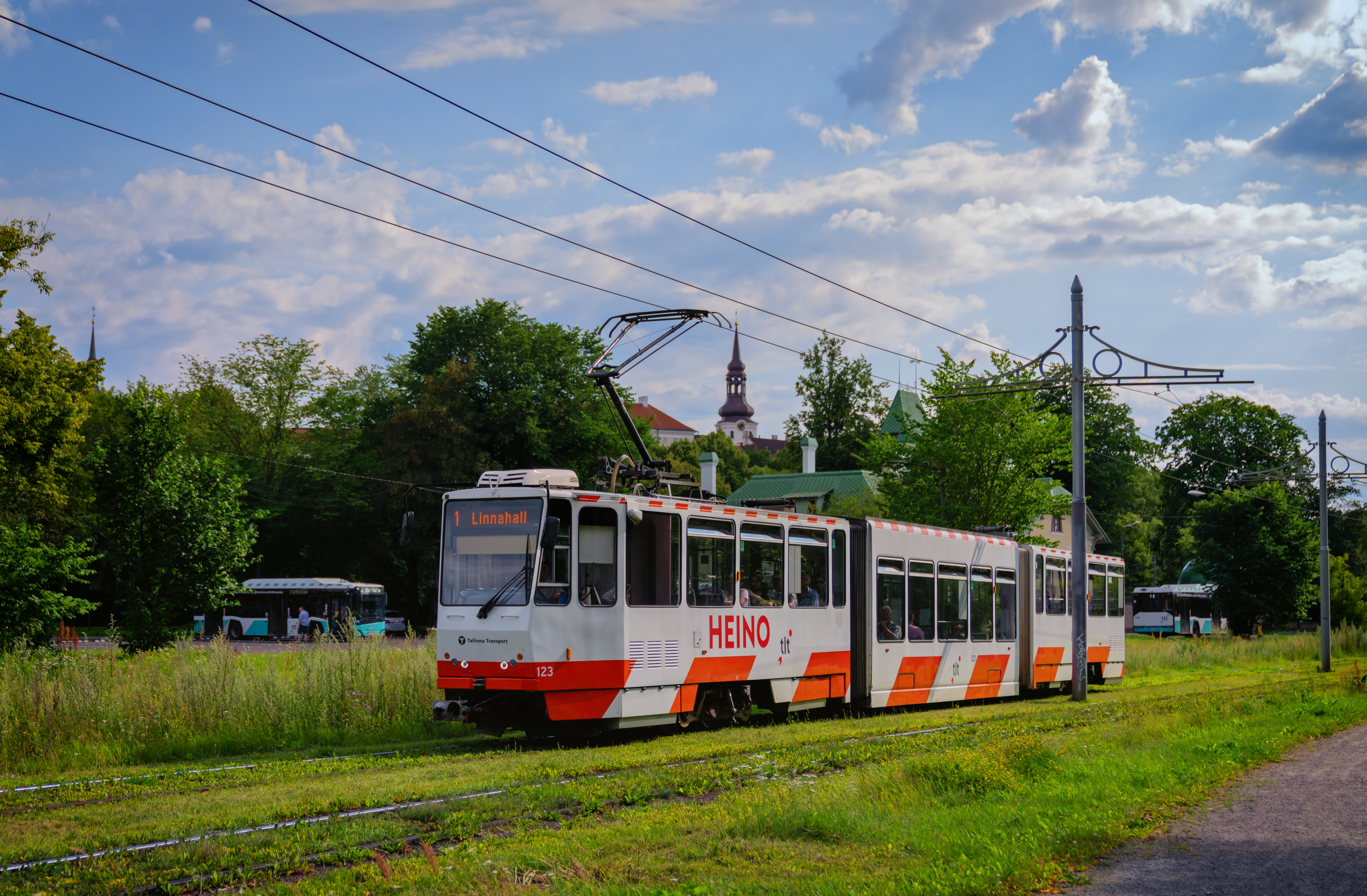
- Tatra KT6TM tram near Tallinn Old Town

Overview
- Locale: Tallinn, Estonia
- Number of lines: 6
- Line number: T1, T2, T3, T4, T5, T6
- Number of stations: 45
- Annual ridership: 19 million (2024)
- Website: https://www.tlt.ee/

Operation
- Began operation: 24 August 1888 (horse); from 1915 (steam); from 1921 (petrol/gasoline); from 1925 (electric)
- Operator: Tallinna Linnatranspordi AS
- Number of vehicles: 59 (2024)

Technical
- System length: 48 km (30 mi) (2024)
- Track gauge: 1,067 mm (3 ft 6 in) standardised since 1931
- Old gauge: In part 1,524 mm (5 ft)
- Electrification: 600 V DC overhead lines
Map of the Tallinn Tram network as of September 2026

Tallinn tram lines

The only tram system in Estonia is in Tallinn, the country's capital city. The four tram lines (currently allocated into six routes), with a total length of 19.7 km (12.2 miles), are arranged in a roughly cross-shaped layout, providing a backbone for the public transport network in the Estonian capital. All lines on the network run across or through the beginning of Narva Maantee in the city centre, with three of the five routes meeting up at the stop Hobujaama. Trams are unidirectional, one-sided and single-person operated, and much of the network runs on segregated two-way track.

The network is operated by Tatra KT4 and KTNF6 types (the latter being former KT4s that have been extended with the addition of a low-floor middle section), CAF Urbos AXLs, and since 2024, 147N Pesa Twists.

The trams, buses and trolleybuses in Tallinn are operated by the capital's transport operator Tallinna Linnatranspordi AS. This company was created on 19 July 2012, when Tallinn's bus company (Tallinna Autobussikoondis) was merged with the tram and trolleybus company (Tallinna Trammi- ja Trollibussikoondis).

== Lines ==
=== Active tram lines ===
Line Number	Route	Stations	Additional information
T1	Kopli – Kadriorg	20/20	Serviced by low-entry vehicles only on Saturdays, Sundays and public holidays
T2	Kopli – Vanasadam – Lennujaam (Airport)	26/26	Serviced by low-entry vehicles only
T3	Tondi – Kadriorg	11/10	Serviced by low-entry vehicles only
T4	Tondi – Lennujaam (Airport)	16/15	Serviced by low-entry vehicles only
T5	Kopli – Vana-Lõuna	21/21	Serviced by low-entry vehicles only on Saturdays, Sundays and public holidays
T6	Kopli – Suur-Paala	25/26	Serviced by low-entry vehicles only

== History ==
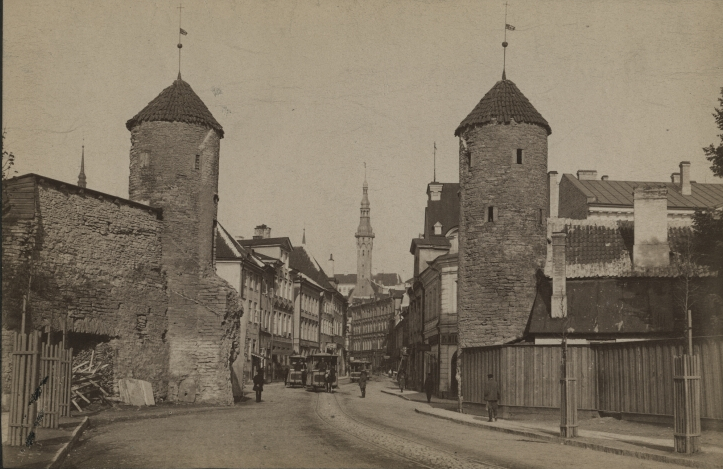
The Viru gates during the construction of horse-drawn railways, 1888.

The first tramline in the city, which was known as Reval until 1917, opened in 1888 and was a horsecar line. The network was built using a 3 ft 6 in (1,067 mm) gauge, and operated on the principal roads crossing the city – Narva Street, Pärnu Street and Tartu Street – using carriages imported from Belgium. By 1902 the total length of the lines in operation was 7.24 km (4.5 miles).

In 1915 two local companies, the Russo-Baltic Shipyard and AS Böckler and Co., constructed a steam tramway 5.1 km (3.2 miles) in length to transport workers from the city centre to their factory in the Kopli quarter. This used a single track 1,524 mm (5 ft) gauge line, corresponding with Russian standard gauge, which also made it suitable for transporting heavy cargo to the harbour. The passenger carriages used were of Russian provenance, purchased second-hand from Saint Petersburg. Later, the steam engines were progressively replaced with internal combustion units.

The section of the network using horse-drawn trams ceased operation in 1918, during World War I, leaving just the steam tramcars running to Kopli. Following the 1920 Treaty of Tartu, wherein Estonian independence was accepted by the Soviets, the rest of the network reopened on 13 May 1921. Horses were made redundant, however, as all the tramcars were now modified to use petrol engines. By then, only two horse-drawn carriages had survived, and were in severe disrepair.

On 28 October 1925, electric trams were introduced, initially on the line along Narva Street. A 600 V DC power supply was used. Six years later, the broad gauge track on the route to Kopli was replaced with 3 ft 6 in (1,067 mm) gauge, which was now standard across the network. After this the line, hitherto operated by a combination of steam- and petrol-powered trams, began to exclusively use petrol-powered trams.

By 1940, the city tram network had extended to 13.4 km (8.3 miles). However, the return of war in 1939, and the conflict that followed the annexation of Estonia by the Soviet Union in 1940, halted further development of the city's tram network.

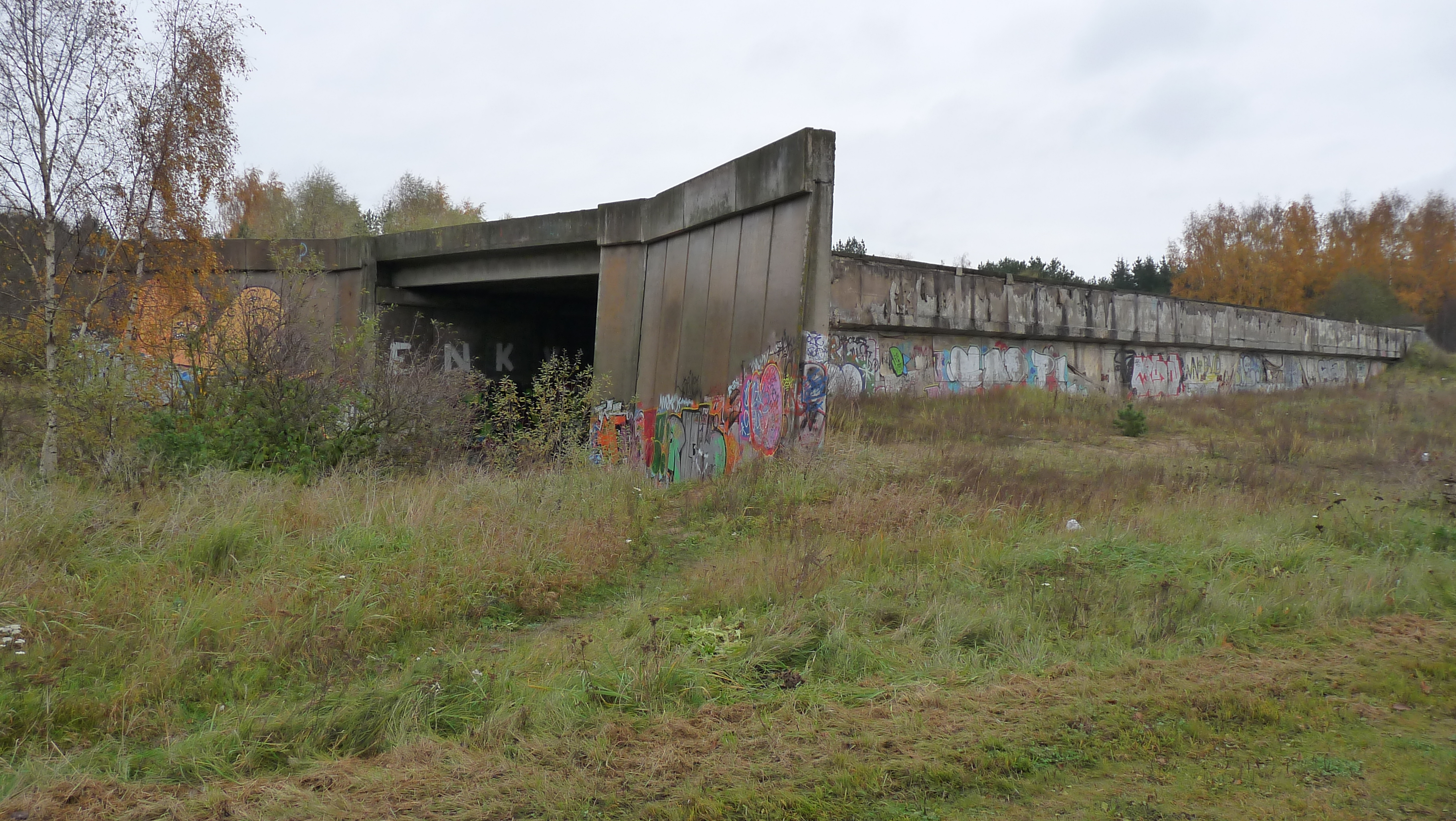
Abandoned unfinished tram infrastructure in Lasnamäe (demolished in 2020)

Despite slow economic growth in the newly-formed Estonian Soviet Socialist Republic, the single-track line between the city centre and Kopli was doubled up in 1951 to create a conventional two-way tram line, and in 1953 it was connected to the rest of the network. 1954 saw the completion of a three-year project to build a tram depot at Vana-Lõuna and, a year after that, the stretch on Tartu Street was extended to Ülemiste. Various further local developments followed. In the 1970s tram routes were planned in Lasnamäe, and in the 1980s Laagna tee was constructed to accommodate this, but the new authorities discontinued this project after the fall of the USSR.

On 1 September 2017, line 4 was extended to the airport. This section was temporarily closed due to construction of the Rail Baltica Ülemiste terminal, but reopened on 1 August 2026.

=== Old City Harbour line ===
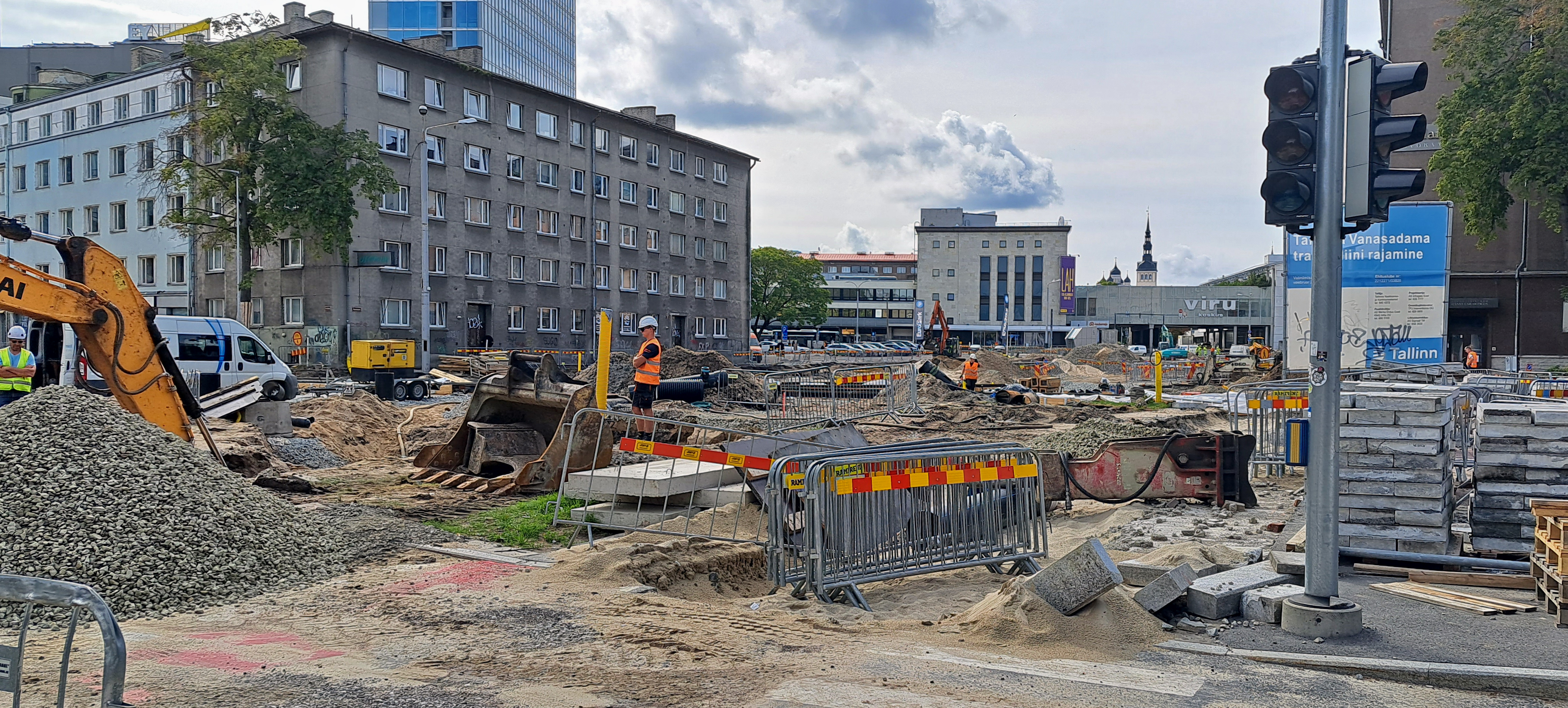
Construction work for the Old City Harbour line underway at the intersection of Gonsiori and Maneeži streets, July 2023

In August 2022, a contract was signed between Tallinn City, AS Merko Ehitus Eesti and KMG Infra OÜ to design and construct a new section of track passing through Tallinn's Old City Harbour (Estonian: Vanasadam). The route would divert from the main route at Gonsiori street, pass through Laikmaa and Hobujaama streets perpendicular to the existing line, thereby relieving pressure on the existing Hobujaama stop, and serve the ferry port's A-Terminal. It would then pass under Linnahall and rejoin the route to Kopli between Mere and Põhja avenues. Construction began on 7 March 2023, starting from Gonsiori street and moving progressively northwest in stages. The project was planned to cost €44.9 million, with the EU's Recovery and Resilience Facility contributing €26 million.

During each stage of construction, bus routes were diverted around the city centre as needed. Tram services were also altered, and a temporary service from Kopli to Tondi (line 6) began on 3 July 2023 while all other lines were halted. While the other lines reopened from September the same year, the temporary service had gained popularity. As a result, on 1 November 2023 it became permanent as line 5, and began operating from Kopli to Vana-Lõuna, a stop outside the Pärnu street tram depot which reopened for the first time since 2004.

From May to August 2024, work on Põhja avenue closed lines 2 and 5, while line 1 operated a shortened route from Kopli to Linnahall (now Suur Rannavärav). A temporary stop and turning circle were built at the latter to facilitate this.

On 21 October 2024 Hobujaama and Laikmaa streets reopened, ending the final bus, traffic and tram diversions caused by the Old City Harbour line's construction.

On 1 December 2024, line 2 started operating along the route. The final cost of the project was €55 million, with €36.5 million contributed by the European Union through the Next Generation EU recovery fund.

== Future extensions ==
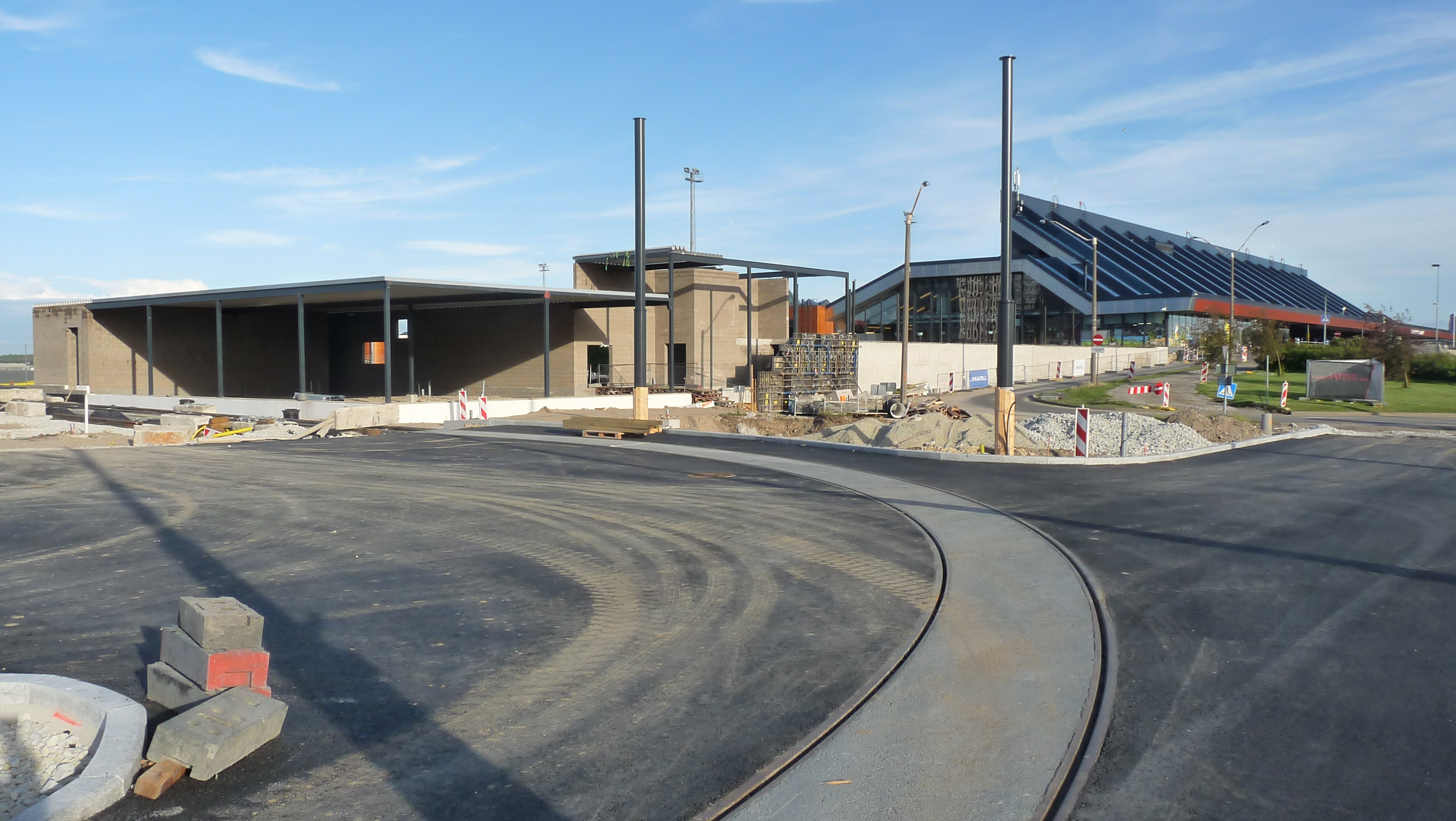
Tram line extending to Tallinn airport in 2017

Discussions on future directions centered on the possibility of phasing out some of the city's motor-bus lines and extending the tram network. Instead of this, between 2010 and 2017 the city of Tallinn replaced four trolleybus lines (2, 6, 7, 9) with regular buses. The electric wires along Paldiski maantee that had supported trolleybus lines 6 and 7 were removed. Whilst some tram tracks have been extended, commitments to extend services further are slow.

In 2023, Tallinn had plans for five possible extensions to the network. The three priority extensions, Liivalaia, Järve and Pelgulinna, could be completed by 2030.

== Rolling stock ==
=== Current fleet ===
Tallinn's tram network is currently serviced by the following fleet:

Class	Image	Top speed		Length metres	Capacity			In service	Fleet numbers	Routes operated	Built	Years operated
Class	Image	mph	km/h	Length metres	Std	Sdg	Total	In service	Fleet numbers	Routes operated	Built	Years operated
Tatra KT4 (including KT4D, KT4SU, KT4TM^{a})		40	65	18.11	36	133	169	5	104, 177, 178, 181, 182	Lines 1 and 5	1979–1990	1981–present
Tatra KT6TM		40	65	26.77	55	191	246	12	96, 97, 98, 99, 102, 103, 109, 110, 114, 123, 131, 148	All lines	2001–2004	2001–present
CAF Urbos AXL		43	70	31	79	140	219	20	501–520	All lines	2011–2015	2015–present
Tatra KT4TMR		37	60	18.11	33	136	169	6	136, 138, 140, 141, 142, 168	Regularly on line 1 and 5 (Line 3 previously)	2016–2018	2017–present
Pesa Twist 147N		50	80	28.6	65	244	309	23	521–543	All lines	2022–2025	2024–present
Total								66				
Notes: a D: German model; SU: Soviet model; TM: modernised units

=== History and former fleet ===
Following the start of electrification in 1931, the first electric tram cars were assembled in Tallinn using parts and sub-assemblies from Germany and Sweden. The first snow-plow came from Sweden in 1930. By 1940 the system was operating with 54 tramcars, of which 20 were electrically powered and nine were still petrol/gasoline powered. The other 28 were unpowered trailer units. Between 1951 and 1954 15 powered tramcars were assembled in the Tallinn depot along with 23 unpowered trailer cars.

==== Gotha units ====
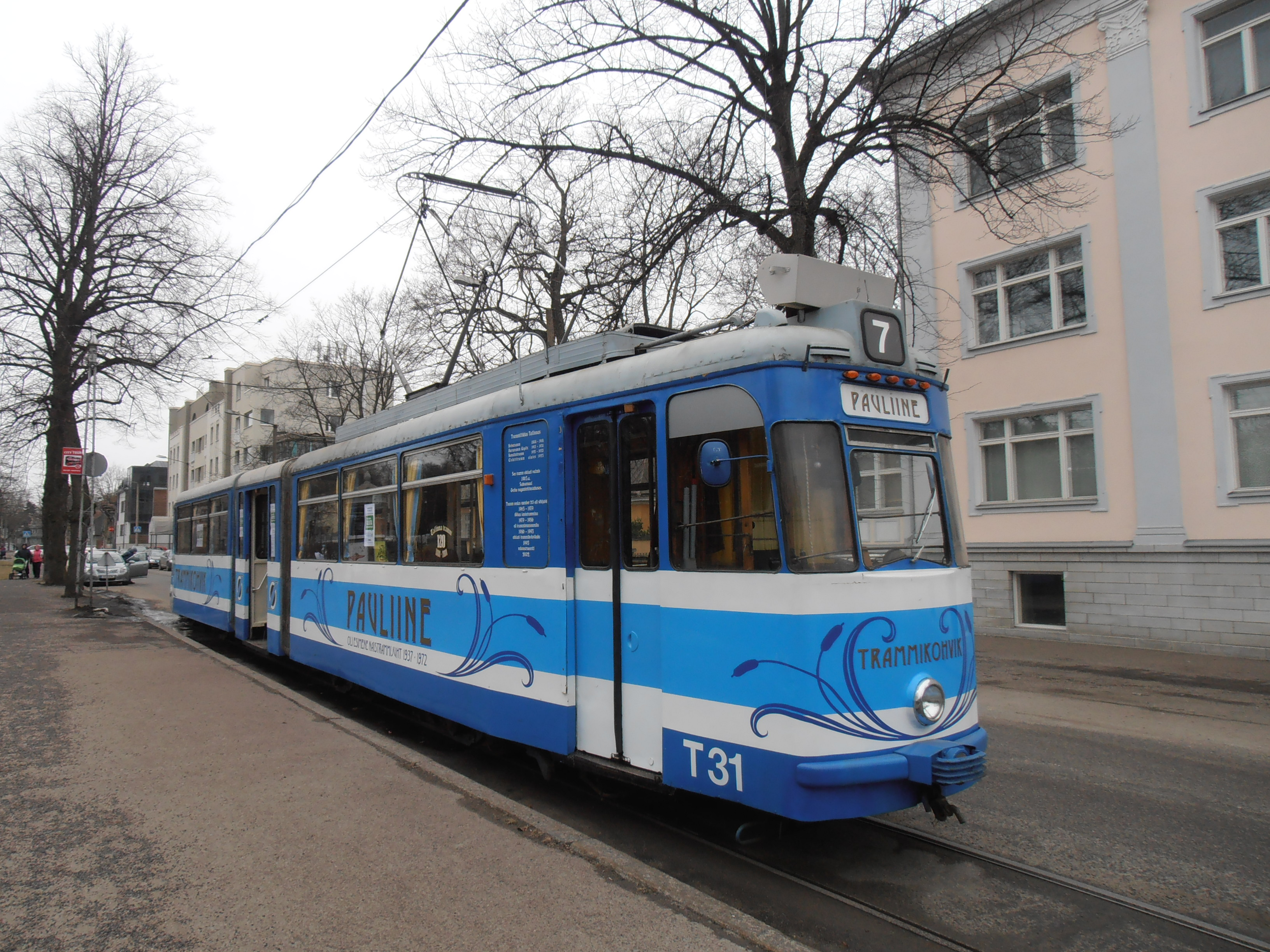
The now-refurbished "Pauliine" Gotha G4 tram, in use as a café

Between 1955 and 1964, 50 powered tramcars and 50 further unpowered trailer cars were delivered from the Gothaer Waggonfabrik rolling stock production facility in southern GDR (East Germany). Between 1965 and 1967, more Gotha G4 "bendy-tram" (hinged) tramcars were added to the fleet. Use of the Gotha G4 units continued until 1988.

One Gotha G4 has survived, and is said to be the only intact unit in the world that can still be operated. In 1990, it was converted into a café and christened "Pauliine", after Tallinn's first female tram driver. The café ceased operation in 2017, and the tram was subsequently left disused for eight years. In 2025, the tram underwent a comprehensive renovation, whereby most of its original features were restored and a new red livery was painted. The café table layout was left unchanged. It remains too old for daily use, and can now be rented for private events.

==== Tatra units ====
In 1973, Tallinn switched suppliers to ČKD Tatra of Prague in Western Czechoslovakia.

By 1990, 60 Tatra T4 trams and 73 Tatra KT4 trams had entered service on the Tallinn network.

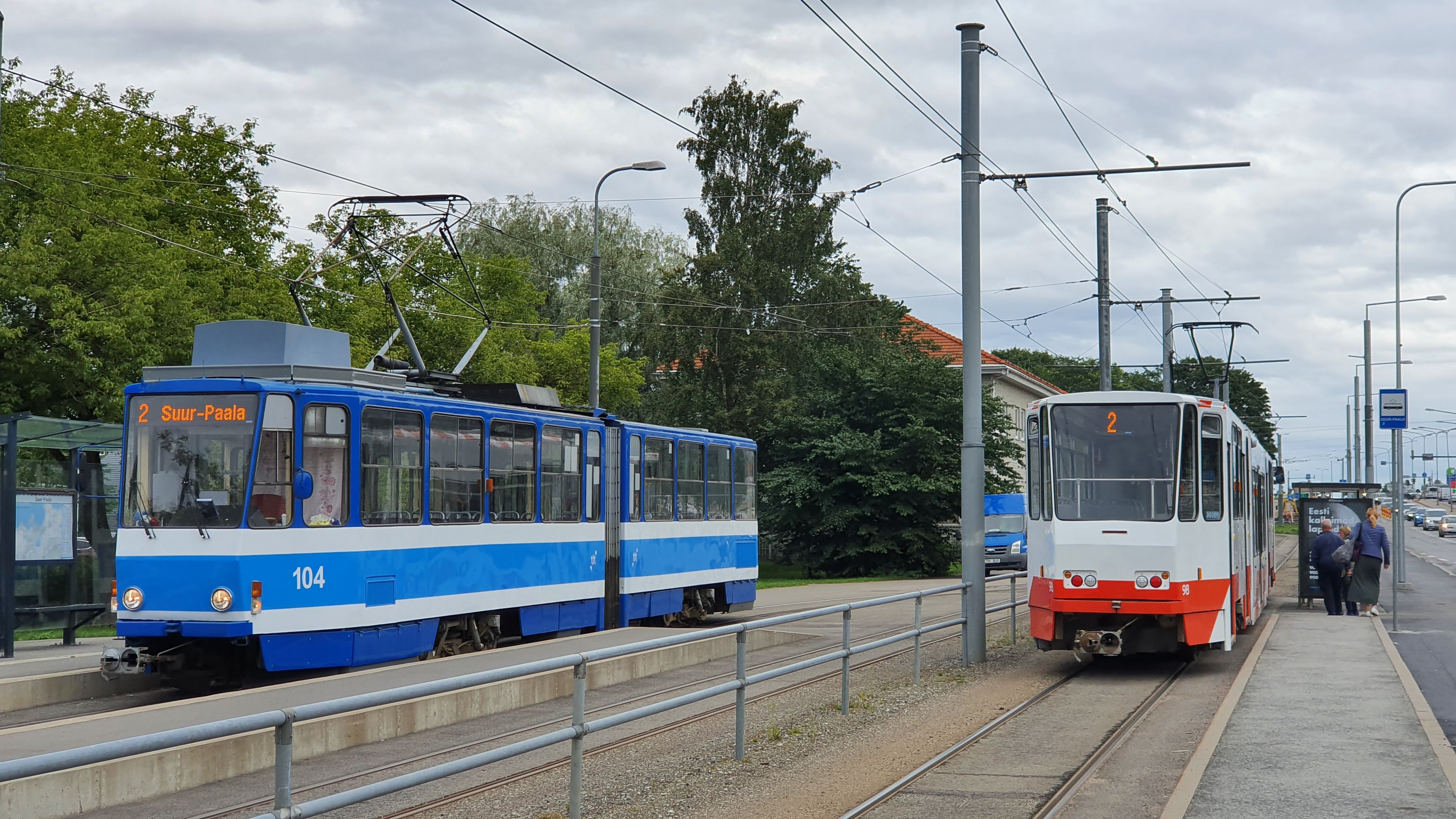
Tatra KT4SU (left) in old blue livery and Tatra KT4DTM at Suur-Paala

After Estonia regained independence in 1991, procurement was focused on second-hand Tatra units. 13 KT4 trams came from the city of Gera, 6 from Cottbus, 16 from Erfurt and 1 from Frankfurt (Oder). In 2001, work had commenced on converting the KT4 fleet into KT6TM units through the addition of a low-floor middle-car. Whilst the use of two-section T4 vehicles came to an end in 2005, the T4-based KT4 and KT6TM trams were the only trams running in Tallinn until the mid-2010s, and remained mainstays of the fleet into the 2020s.

From the early 2000s, there has also been a focus on enhanced maintenance schedules and the use of more robust replacement parts in order to extend the operating life of rolling stock from 19 to 25–30 years.

==== 2010-present ====
A new generation of trams for Tallinn arrived when Estonia sold unused emissions permits worth €45 million to Spain, which specified that new, energy efficient trams be purchased in exchange. The multi-party deal involved the Spanish constructor CAF and required the delivery of 20 new, low-floor Urbos AXL trams by 2016. The first unit was delivered to the city towards the end of 2014, and was thoroughly tested and entered into service by March 2015. The trams initially only ran on line 3, but later began to operate across the entire network. The CAF Urbos trams have known design problems that have not been solved since the adoption of the trams: the noise levels from the electric motors are exceptionally high and the trams noticeably lean from side to side during braking.

Since 2018, twelve of the converted KT6TM trams have worn liveries depicting influential Estonian musical figures. Each contains the person's name and photo on the outside of the front car, and an informational panel can be found inside at the front.

There are also 6 refurbished KT4TMR 'retro' trams, bearing the names of important figures in the country's history. As with the KT6TMs, they have an information panel inside the front car. Unlike the rest of the fleet, these trams use wooden benches placed in a longitudinal configuration.

Since 2024, Pesa Twist trams have also been operating on the system.

== Ticketing ==
As with all public transport in Tallinn, the tram network is free to use for residents of the city, senior citizens and those with disabilities, along with certain other groups. Journeys are paid for by buying an Ühiskaart smartcard at a kiosk. The card itself costs €3, after which funds can be loaded onto it and used to pay for tickets.

Duration	Price
One hour	€2
One day	€5.50
Three days	€9
Five days	€11
Thirty days	€30

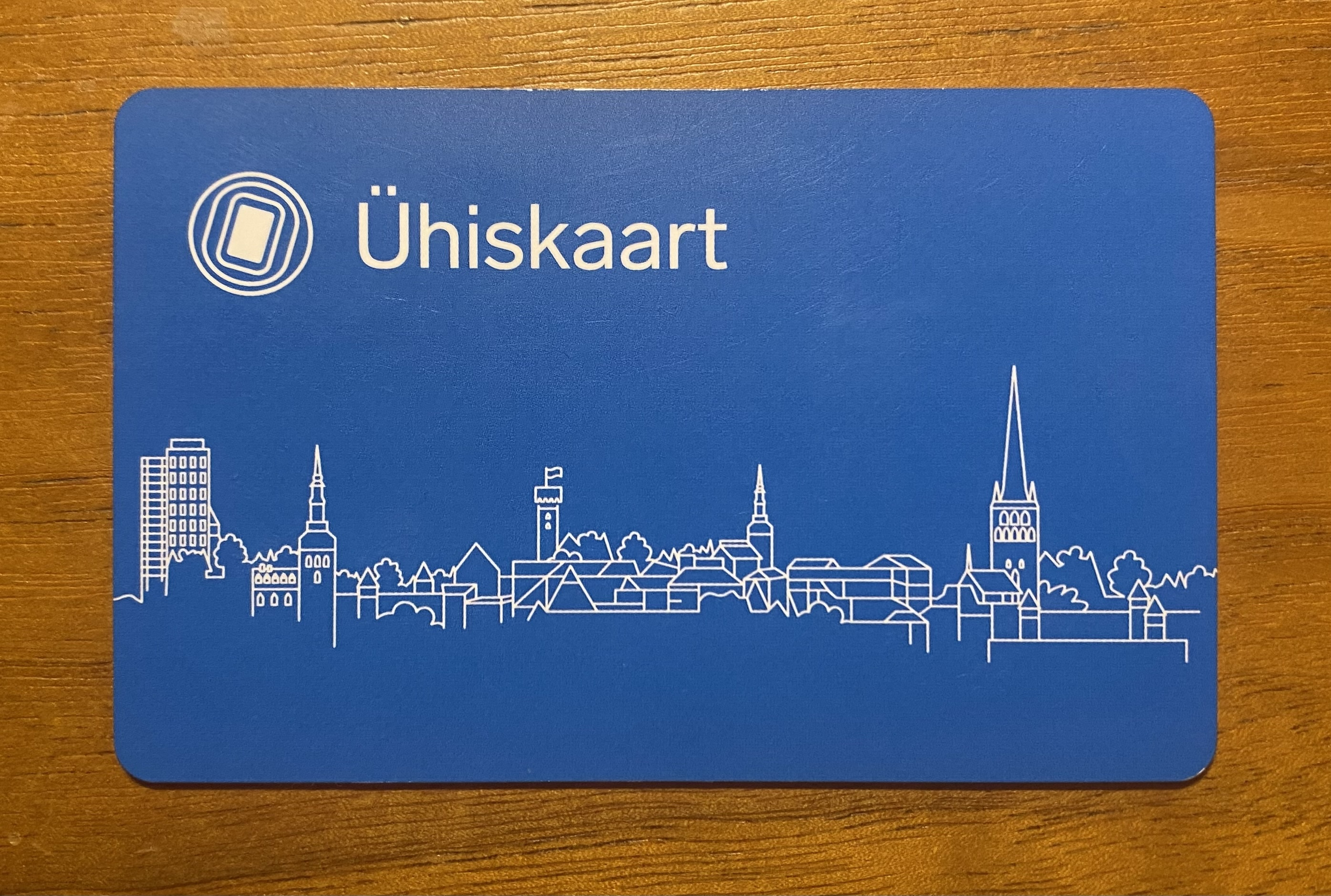
Tallinn's 128-bit AES encrypted Ühiskaart, launched December 2024

Additionally, those eligible for discounted tickets may purchase a one hour ticket for €1, or a thirty day ticket for €13.

On 1 December 2024 a blue-colour Ühiskaart was launched, using more sophisticated 128-bit AES encryption to keep user data secure. This card was introduced in addition to the existing green-colour card, which continued to be valid after this change. On its release, the card's price rose from €2 to €3.

== Statistics ==
=== Track length ===
Tallinn's tram system had 39km of single tracks from 1990 to 2014. Following the completion of the airport extension this increased to 43km in 2017, and the Old City Harbour extension brought the total to 48km in 2024.

=== Rolling stock ===
The number of tramcars on the system peaked at 135 in 1985 and has since been steadily falling. The rate of decrease accelerated during the 2000s, with available rolling stock almost halving from 125 trams in 2000 to 77 in 2010. This number has reduced further, to only 59 in 2024, as the delivery of new trams since 2014 has not been sufficient to replace the deprecating fleet.

=== Passenger numbers ===
The recorded number of passenger journeys has also fallen, first from a peak of 105.9 million in 1990 to 35.2 million in 1995. This was in part due to a change in data collection: the number of journeys assumed from the purchase of a monthly card was reduced from 120 to 75. Passenger numbers have since trended slightly downwards, fluctuating between 20 and 30 million yearly journeys from 2001 to 2019. The COVID-19 pandemic saw passenger journeys drop to 13.4 million in 2021, the lowest yearly figure on record. The latest data available shows that 19 million journeys were taken in 2024.

As public transport has been free for residents of Tallinn since 2013, there have been instances of passengers not validating their journeys. Despite the authorities confirming that this is a necessary step, and the fact that data on passenger numbers was not collected from 2013 to 2018 in order to compensate for this, this may have impacted the reported figure for passenger journeys from 2013 onwards.

Rolling Stock and Passenger Statistics 1980-2024
Year	Rolling stock	Passenger journeys (millions) (Note: Data for the years 2013-2018 not collected)	% change (journeys)
1980	129	78.3	–
1985	135	99.6	▲ +21.3
1990	132	105.9	▲ +6.3
1991	132	100.3	▼ -5.6
1992	132	103.3	▲ +3.0
1993	132	75.3	▼ -28.0
1994	131	16.0	▼ -59.3
1995	129	35.2	▲ +19.2
1996	131	35.6	▲ +0.4
1997	134	36.9	▲ +1.3
1998	130	30.6	▼ -6.3
1999	129	29.3	▼ -1.3
2000	125	34.9	▲ +5.6
2001	121	29.2	▼ -5.7
2002	116	30.8	▲ +1.6
2003	113	31.1	▲ +0.3
2004	104	27.8	▼ -3.3
2005	89	25.1	▼ -2.7
2006	95	26.2	▲ +1.1
2007	95	26.4	▲ +0.2
2008	88	25.3	▼ -1.1
2009	85	25.1	▼ -0.2
2010	77	24.5	▼ -0.6
2011	77	22.1	▼ -2.4
2012	77	31.5	▲ +9.4
2013	77	–	–
2014	67	–	–
2015	78	–	–
2016	72	–	–
2017	72	–	–
2018	70	–	–
2019	70	29.8	▼ -5.4
2020	66	17.2	▼ -12.6
2021	65	13.4	▼ -3.8
2022	65	18.1	▲ +4.7
2023	65	20.1	▲ +2.0
2024	59	19.0	▼ -1.1

== See also ==
- Public transport in Tallinn
- Transport in Estonia
