= Škoda ForCity =

Family of low-floor trams

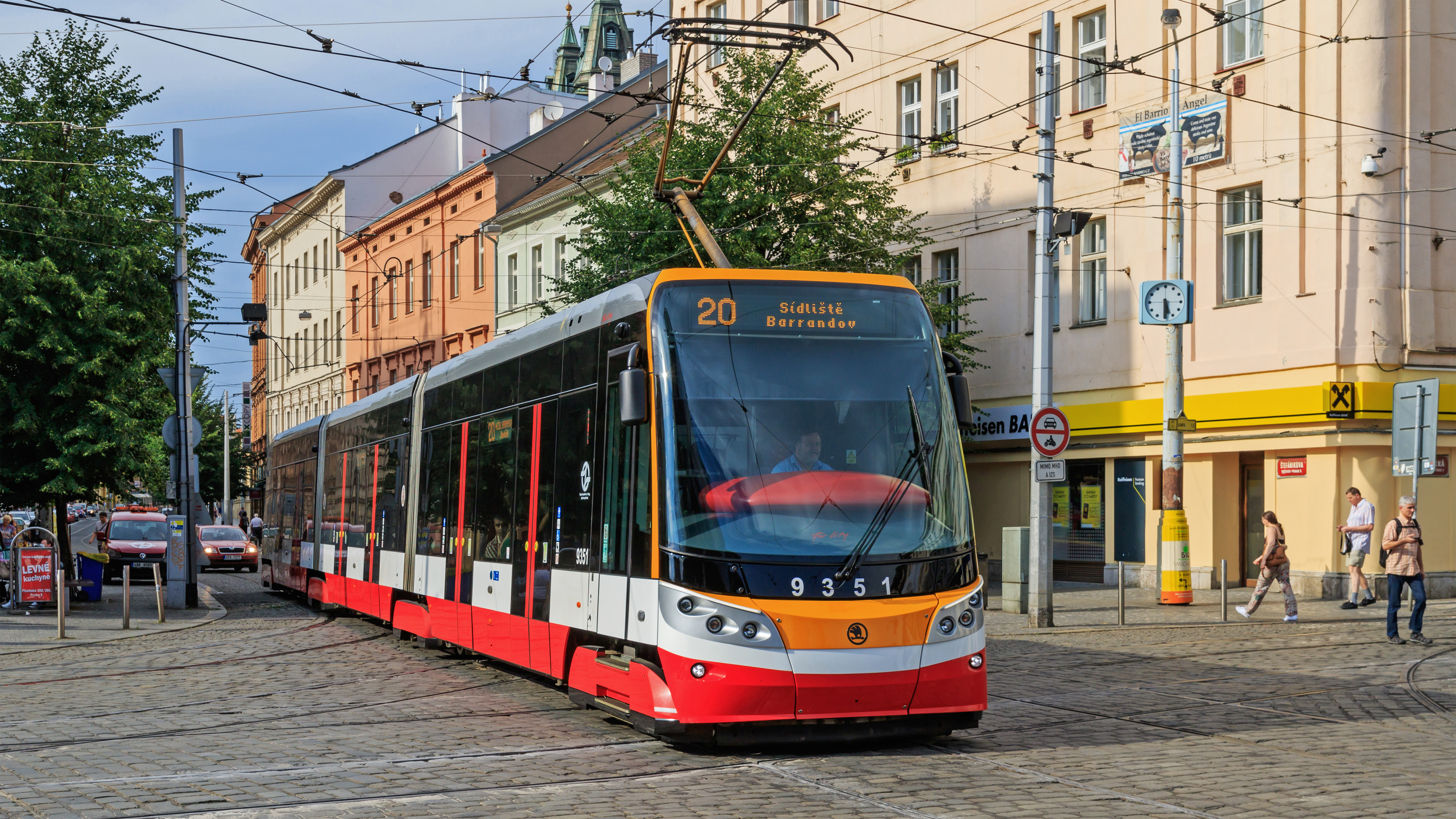
A Škoda 15 T ForCity Alfa tram in Prague

Škoda ForCity is a family of low-floor trams manufactured by Škoda Transportation and its subsidiaries. The range comprises four main product lines: ForCity Alfa, Classic, Plus and Smart. ForCity Smart is Škoda's newest modular platform, while development has continued across the range, including the latest 52T ForCity Plus tram.

The ForCity Smart range also includes the Artic trams developed in Finland by Transtech. After Škoda Transportation acquired Transtech, the vehicles became part of the ForCity Smart range and are marketed as ForCity Smart Artic.

== Development ==
Škoda introduced the ForCity generation in 2008 as a successor to its earlier Astra and Elektra low-floor tram designs. The first model was the 15T, developed for Prague as a fully low-floor, three-section tram; 250 vehicles were ordered for the city's network. A modified version was subsequently supplied to Riga.

The range was later expanded with the ForCity Classic, Plus and Smart product lines. Škoda also incorporated the Finnish-developed Artic design after acquiring a controlling stake in its manufacturer, Transtech, in 2015 and became its sole owner in 2018.

== Design ==
=== ForCity Smart ===
ForCity Smart uses pivoting bogies and a vehicle layout designed to distribute weight more evenly between them, resulting in lower axle loads. Variants have been developed for networks including Ostrava, Plzeň, Brno, Bonn, the Rhein-Neckar region and Kassel.

Škoda also markets the Finnish-developed Artic design as part of the ForCity Smart range. ForCity Smart Artic vehicles include trams for Helsinki, Tampere and the Jokeri light rail line.

=== ForCity Plus ===
ForCity Plus combines pivoting and non-pivoting bogies. Pivoting bogies at the ends of the vehicle reduce wear when negotiating curves, while the proportion of low-floor area varies between configurations. The design has been used for the 29T and 30T in Bratislava, the 46T–48T for Frankfurt (Oder), Cottbus and Brandenburg an der Havel, and the 52T for Prague.

=== ForCity Alfa ===
ForCity Alfa uses pivoting bogies and is fully low-floor. The use of an additional bogie allows the vehicle weight to be distributed over more axles, reducing axle loads, while the pivoting bogies reduce wear when negotiating curves. The design has been used for the 15T, supplied to Prague and Riga.

=== ForCity Classic ===
ForCity Classic uses non-pivoting bogies with conventional rigid axles and is fully low-floor. The design can be adapted to different vehicle lengths and widths, track gauges and drive configurations. Variants have been supplied to Miskolc, Konya, Eskişehir and Chemnitz, with the 49T developed for Bergamo.

== Orders and operators ==
Country	Network	Image	Family	Type	Quantity	Delivery	Gauge	Notes
Czech Republic	Prague		ForCity Alfa	15T	250	2011–2019	1,435 mm	
Latvia	Riga		ForCity Alfa	15T	46	2010–2021	1,524 mm	
Hungary	Miskolc		ForCity Classic	26T	31	2013–2014	1,435 mm	
Turkey	Konya		ForCity Classic	28T	72	2013–2015	1,435 mm	12 vehicles are fitted with batteries for catenary-free operation.
Turkey	Eskişehir	—	ForCity Classic	18T	14	2018–2019	1,000 mm	Fitted with batteries for catenary-free operation.
Germany	Chemnitz		ForCity Classic	35T	14	2018–2020	1,435 mm	
Italy	Bergamo	—	ForCity Classic	49T	10	2026	1,435 mm	For the T2 line between Bergamo and Villa d'Almè.
Slovakia	Bratislava		ForCity Plus	29T	60	2015–2016; 2023; 2026	1,000 mm	
Slovakia	Bratislava		ForCity Plus	30T	40	2014–2015; 2024	1,000 mm	
Germany	Frankfurt (Oder)		ForCity Plus	46T	13	2024–	1,000 mm	
Germany	Cottbus		ForCity Plus	47T	22	2024–	1,000 mm	
Germany	Brandenburg an der Havel	—	ForCity Plus	48T	8	2024–	1,000 mm	Four additional vehicles were ordered in August 2026.
Czech Republic	Prague		ForCity Plus	52T	71	2025–2027	1,435 mm	Option for 129 additional vehicles.
Finland	Helsinki		ForCity Smart	Artic	70	2013–2019	1,000 mm	
Germany	Schöneiche		ForCity Smart	Artic	3	2018–2020	1,000 mm	Two vehicles were former Helsinki pre-series trams; the third was newly built.
Finland	Tampere		ForCity Smart	Artic X34 / X45	35	2020–2028	1,435 mm	By August 2028 the fleet is planned to comprise 16 X34 and 19 X45 vehicles.
Finland	Jokeri light rail (Helsinki and Espoo)		ForCity Smart	Artic X54	29	2021–2023	1,000 mm	
Finland	Crown Bridges (Helsinki)	—	ForCity Smart	Artic X54	23	2025–	1,000 mm	Ordered under an option from the Jokeri light rail procurement.
Czech Republic	Ostrava		ForCity Smart	39T	38	2021–2024	1,435 mm	
Czech Republic	Plzeň		ForCity Smart	40T	22	2021–2025	1,435 mm	
Germany	Rhein-Neckar-Verkehr (Mannheim, Ludwigshafen and Heidelberg)		ForCity Smart	36T / 37T / 38T	114	2022–	1,000 mm	Supplied in approximately 30, 40 and 60 m versions.
Germany	Bonn		ForCity Smart	41T	28	2023–2026	1,435 mm	
Czech Republic	Brno		ForCity Smart	45T	40	2022–2026	1,435 mm	
Germany	Kassel	—	ForCity Smart	50T	22	2026–	1,435 mm	Option for 18 additional vehicles.
Germany	Mainz	—	ForCity Smart	53T	22	2028–2030	1,000 mm	Option for 8 additional vehicles.
Sweden	Uppsala	—	ForCity Smart	Artic X34	20	2028–	1,435 mm	Option for 18 additional vehicles.
