= Škoda 28 T =

Low-floor tram manufactured by Škoda transportation for use in Konya

Škoda 28T
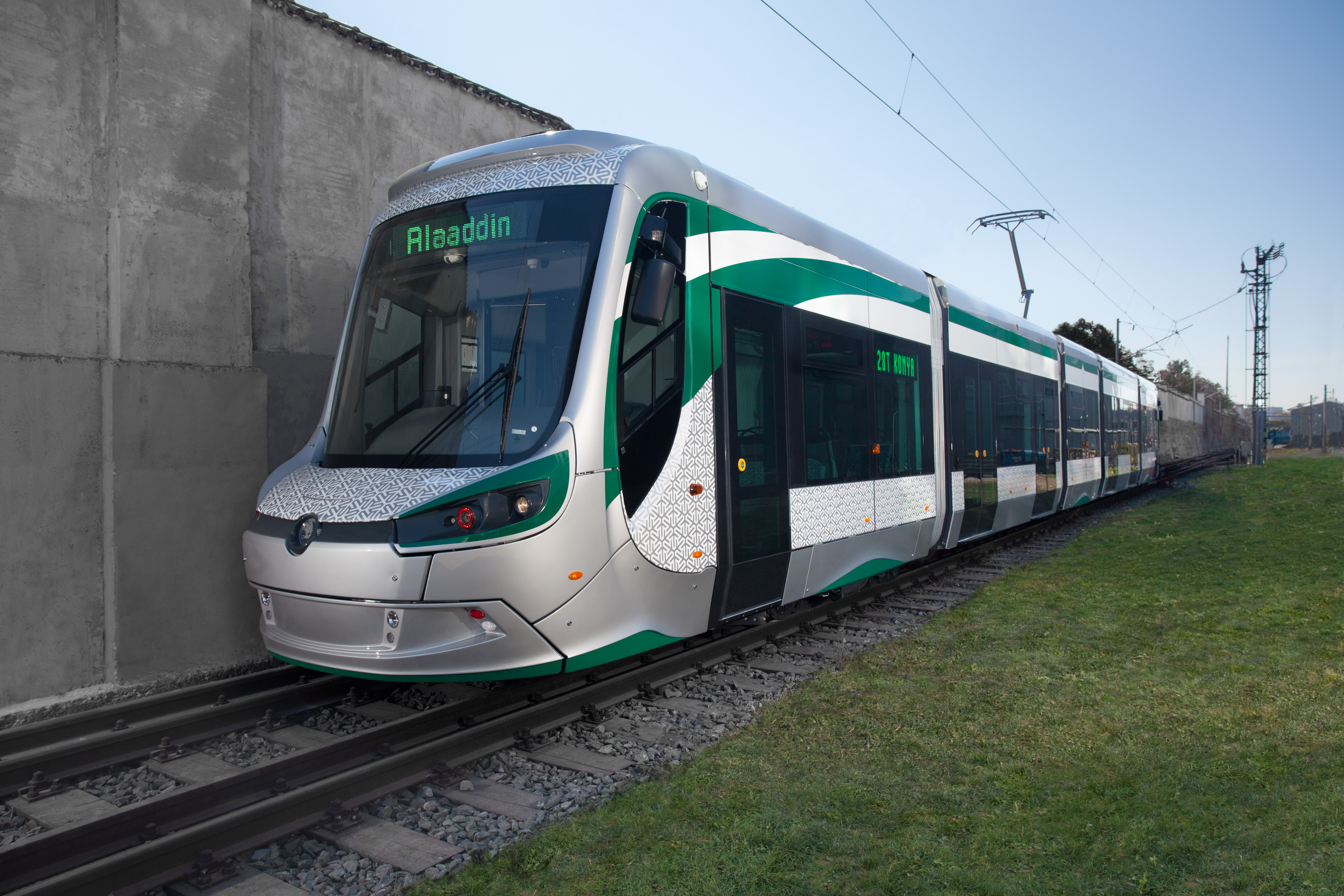
- Manufacturer: Škoda Transportation
- Assembly: Plzeň, Czech Republic
- Family name: Škoda ForCity
- Constructed: 2014–2015
- Number built: 72
- Predecessor: Škoda 26 T
- Successor: Škoda 35 T

Specifications
- Train length: 32,520 mm (1,280 in)
- Width: 2,550 mm (100 in)
- Height: 3,560 mm (140 in)
- Low-floor: 100%
- Articulated sections: 5 body sections
- Maximum speed: 70 km/h (43 mph)
- Bogies: 3 x fixed
- Track gauge: 1,435 mm (4 ft 8 1/2 in)

Škoda 28 T (also known as Škoda ForCity Classic) is a low floor bi-directional tram, developed by Škoda Transportation for the Konya Tram system in the Turkish city of Konya. The tram is fully air-conditioned and is based on the Škoda 26 T model developed for the city of Miskolc. Konya Municipality ordered 60 units in 2013.

In 2014, 12 additional units capable of catenary-free operation were ordered for a new tram line in Konya which will have a 1.8 km (1.1 mi) long section without overhead lines.

== Design ==
The tram has five sections and is 100% low floor and fully air-conditioned. Three sections have fixed bogies and the other two are suspended between them. There are six doors on each side of the vehicle. The tram meets fire safety standards for operating through the light rail tunnel in Konya.

== Interior ==
The tram has to meet specific criteria in the city of Konya. Unlike its predecessor, 26T, 28T has enhanced high-power air-conditioning, both for the driver and for the passengers. It also has the ability to be run in a 2 vehicle train setup. The tram has integrated passenger LED information system built right into the overhead ceiling, between the sections. The on-board computer is BUS-TEC. Outer information panels are also made by BUS-TEC. Wi-Fi and acoustic information system is provided.

== Škoda 28T2 ==
A special variant of the tram has been developed which is fitted with nano-lithium-titanium batteries, allowing the tram to run on batteries for at least 3 km. This was requested by the city of Konya, as there is a section of unelectrified track (approximately 1.7 km). The colors of the vehicle are different from the standard 28T.
