= Trams in Bratislava =

Tram system in Bratislava, Slovakia

Bratislava tram network Električková doprava v Bratislave
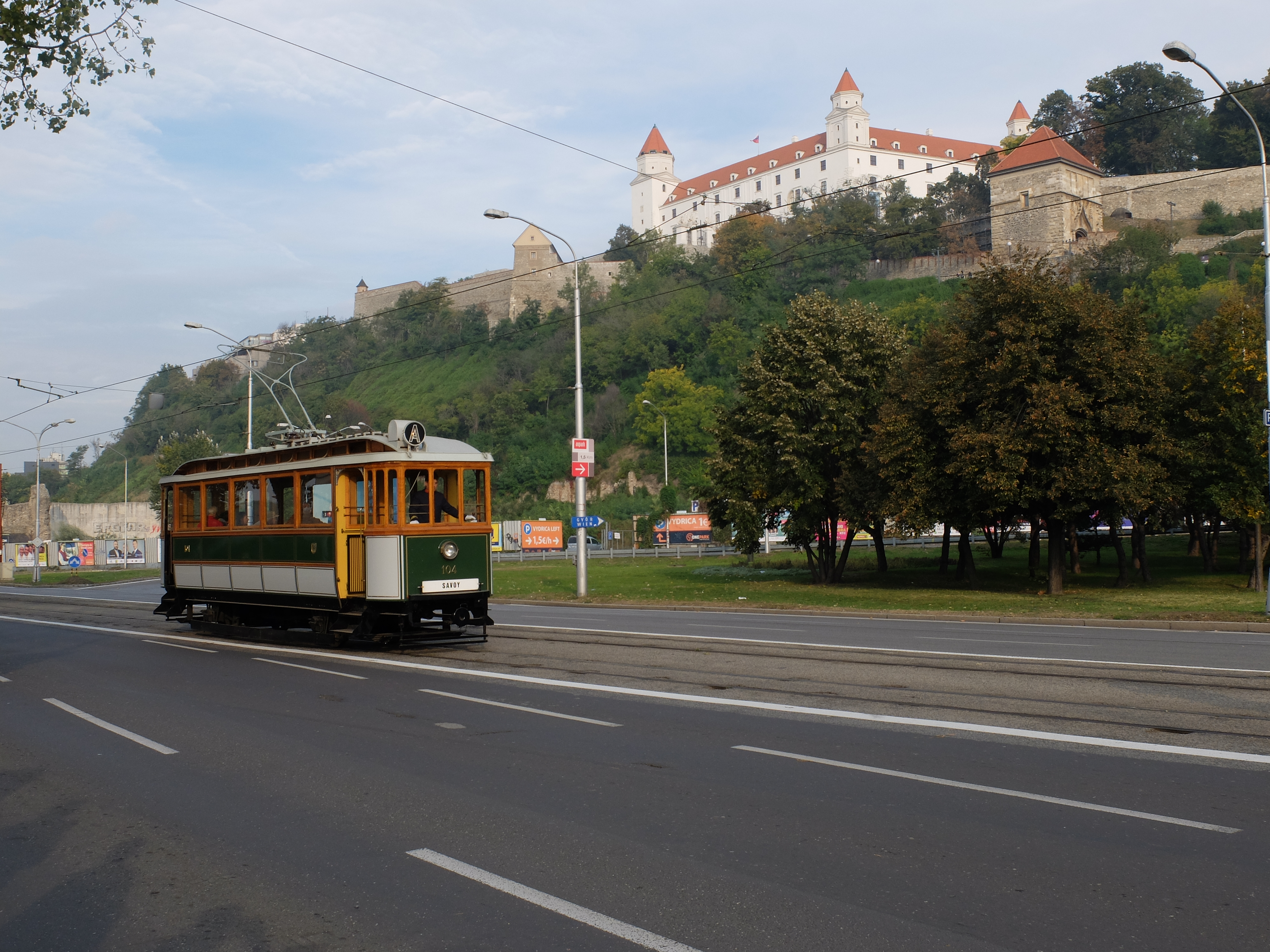
- Ganz 1911

Operation
- Locale: Bratislava, Slovakia
- Open: 1895
- Status: Operational
- Routes: 5
- Operator: Dopravný podnik Bratislava

Infrastructure
- Track gauge: 1,000 mm (3 ft 3 3/8 in)
- Electrification: 600 V DC
- Stock: 211 tram vehicles

Statistics
- Track length (single): 42 km (26 mi)
- Route length: 267.3 km (166.1 mi)
Overview
Map of the network
- Website: https://www.dpb.sk DPB

Bratislava tram network (Slovak: Električková doprava v Bratislave) serves Bratislava (the capital city of Slovakia). It is operated by Dopravný podnik Bratislava, a. s and the system is known as Mestská hromadná doprava (MHD, municipal mass transit).

Trams in the city have been electrically powered since the system was opened in 1895; there were never any horse-driven or steam-powered trams in Bratislava. It is the one of two urban tram systems in Slovakia with the other system located in Košice. Conversions to standard-gauge railway have been proposed in the past, but the network uses narrow-gauge 1,000 mm (3 ft 3 3/8 in) track also known as metre-gauge. Rolling stock consists of 211 tram vehicles and trams operate on four lines over approximately 42 km (26 mi) of track.

== History ==
=== Beginnings ===
Permission was granted by the Hungarian Royal Ministry of Trade on 2 June 1893 for Bratislava (then Pozsony) to open its first tram line. The first line was inaugurated on 27 August 1895, and took the route from today's SNP Bridge to the end of today's Štefánikova street. There were nine vehicles in operation that were powered by electricity at a voltage of 550 V. Construction of new sections continued, and in September 1895, a continuation of the line was opened to the main station; the complete line was more than 3 km long. Several other lines were opened in January of the following year. Horse-drawn omnibus services were retired as a result.

=== Second World War ===
After the outbreak of the war, transport demands were sharply increased which had an effect on tram services. Night services had to be cancelled after 10 pm. In 1941, construction of the tunnel under Bratislava Castle, which is now used by trams, began. The tunnel construction took 8 years and the tunnel was put into operation in 1949. During the Second World War, it served as an anti-aircraft cover and was later used by car transport and pedestrians. Since 1983, it has been designed exclusively for trams.

In 1942, classic pantographs were installed on the network. Two more years later, the number designation of tram lines and other modes of transport was introduced. Just before and during the Red Army's occupation of the city in 1945, all public transport, including the railroad, was halted in the city. After the liberation, 90% of the network was damaged, and extensive repairs began to correct this.

=== Socialist era ===
In 1950s, first 6MT trams appeared. The track from Karlova Ves was doubled and the last monorail section disappeared. Since 1952, the number of lines has increased to five.

=== Post-communism ===
Tram lines of a fast-lane character (Rača, 1988) were opened on the just-completed housing estates. In the same year, the operation of Tatra T2 trams was terminated and the construction of the metro started but it was stopped a year later.

Plans were proposed to swap Bratislava's tram tracks into a 1,435 mm (4 ft 8 1/2 in) standard-gauge track. At the time in the former Czechoslovakia, only networks in Bratislava and in Liberec featured this track gauge. The 1990s marked the modernisation of the rolling stock (K2S, T3G, T3Mod, etc.) and brand new trams of the Tatra T6A5 type were delivered between 1991 and 1997. At this time, however, the tram network became very congested, both for reasons of financial savings and by extending the intervals, and also because there was still no carrier system of public transport.

=== Recent times ===
After more than 20 years of metro proposals floating, in 2002, all plans for the metro were officially cancelled and preparations began to replace it with rapid transit trams.

However, the first steps were only taken in 2006 when the Petržalka tram project was submitted for an environmental impact assessment and the first steps were taken for the start of construction. The start of construction was planned for the summer of 2007. At a similar time, Škoda 06 T trams have been tested in Bratislava. This vehicle was originally developed for the Italian city of Cagliari, where a 960mm track gauge is used, while for the tests in Bratislava its chassis was modified to 1,000 mm (3 ft 3 3/8 in).

A turn of events took place in March 2007 when the Bratislava City Hall and the Slovak Railways (ŽSR) announced the intention to build the line on a 1,000 mm (3 ft 3 3/8 in) (Bratislava tramway) and 1,435 mm (4 ft 8 1/2 in) (Slovak railway gauge) with the intention to use the track for both trains and trams. Opponents argued that this solution was not feasible due to the differences between the voltage used by trams and trains.

A new proposal for the development of tram lines was also presented to the City Hall the same year. In addition to the Petržalka expansion, with the new proposal trams could also reach the city district of Vajnory, Devínska Nová Ves (extension of the line from the Pri Kríži stop to Dúbravka and around the housing estate in Devínska Nová Ves to the Volkswagen plant) and Vrakuňa. The new lines would also lead to Prievoz and Mlynská Dolina.

The first stage of the construction of the tramway to Petržalka over the Old Bridge took place, by rebuilding the Old Bridge, where the reopening took place on 16 February 2016. A consortium of three firms led by Eurovia SK carried out the project for EUR 58 million excluding VAT. As much as 85% of the project’s costs was financed from European Union funds, while the state contributed 10% and the city contributed 5%.

Funds were also used to buy thirty air conditioned low-floor Škoda 30T trams and thirty Škoda 29T trams. With this signing, DPB completed three large tenders for electric traction vehicles. In addition to trams, DPB also bought trolleybuses. The modernisation programme of Tatra K2 vehicles was completed and since 1 February 2010 only renovated or new Tatra K2S and Tatra K2G cars have been running on Bratislava's rails.

On 15 June 2020, a reconstruction started on the section between the stops Cintorín Rača and Záhumenice on Račianska radial. The reconstructed line was opened on 7 September 2020.

On 27 July 2025, the second stage of Petržalka tram line was opened.

== Routes ==
The colours of the lines correspond to the markings in the timetables and transport schemes of the Bratislava Transport Company.

Tram	Line
1	Hlavná stanica ↔ Nám. Ľ. Štúra
3	Rača, Komisárky ↔ Petržalka, Južné mesto
4	Stn. Nové Mesto / Zlaté piesky ↔ Dúbravka, Pri kríži
9	Ružinov, Astronomická ↔ Karlova Ves, Kútiky

== Infrastructure ==
=== Depots ===
The network has two depots: Vozovňa Jurajov Dvor and Vozovňa Krasňany. The first depot was opened in the 1950s, with the second opening in 1973.

=== Power supply ===
The tram network is powered by a DC voltage of 600 V; the positive pole is in the trolleys (pantograph) with the negative pole in the rails.

== Rolling stock ==
The fleet consists exclusively of trams of Czech or Czechoslovak production from the defunct manufacturer ČKD and Škoda Transportation. Older wagons are modernized.

Image	Type	Delivered	In service	Low-floor	Air-conditioned
Tatra T3M	Tatra T3M	1982 (modernized 1984 and 1992)	2	No	No
Tatra T3G	Tatra T3G	1989 (modernized 1993—1997)	6	No	No
	Tatra T3S	1975 (modernized 1998—1999)	2	No	No
	Tatra T3P	1975—1987 (modernized 2002—2013)	22	No	No
	Tatra K2G	1983 (modernized 1998—2005)	1	No	No
	Tatra K2S	1971—2009 (modernized 1998—2009)	13	No	No
	Tatra T6A5	1991—1997	58	No	No
Škoda 30 T	Škoda 30 T	2014—2015, 2024	40	Yes	Yes
Škoda 30 T	Škoda 29 T	2015—2016, 2023, 2026	60	Yes	Yes

== See also ==
- History of Bratislava
- Public transport in Bratislava
