= X34 =

X34 may refer to:

- ANSI X3.4-1967, a character-encoding scheme
- Orbital Sciences X-34, an American spaceplane program
- RFA Aldersdale (X34), a fleet tanker of the Royal Fleet Auxiliary
- Škoda Artic X34, a tram
