= Škoda 26 T =

Tram model produced by Škoda

Škoda 26T
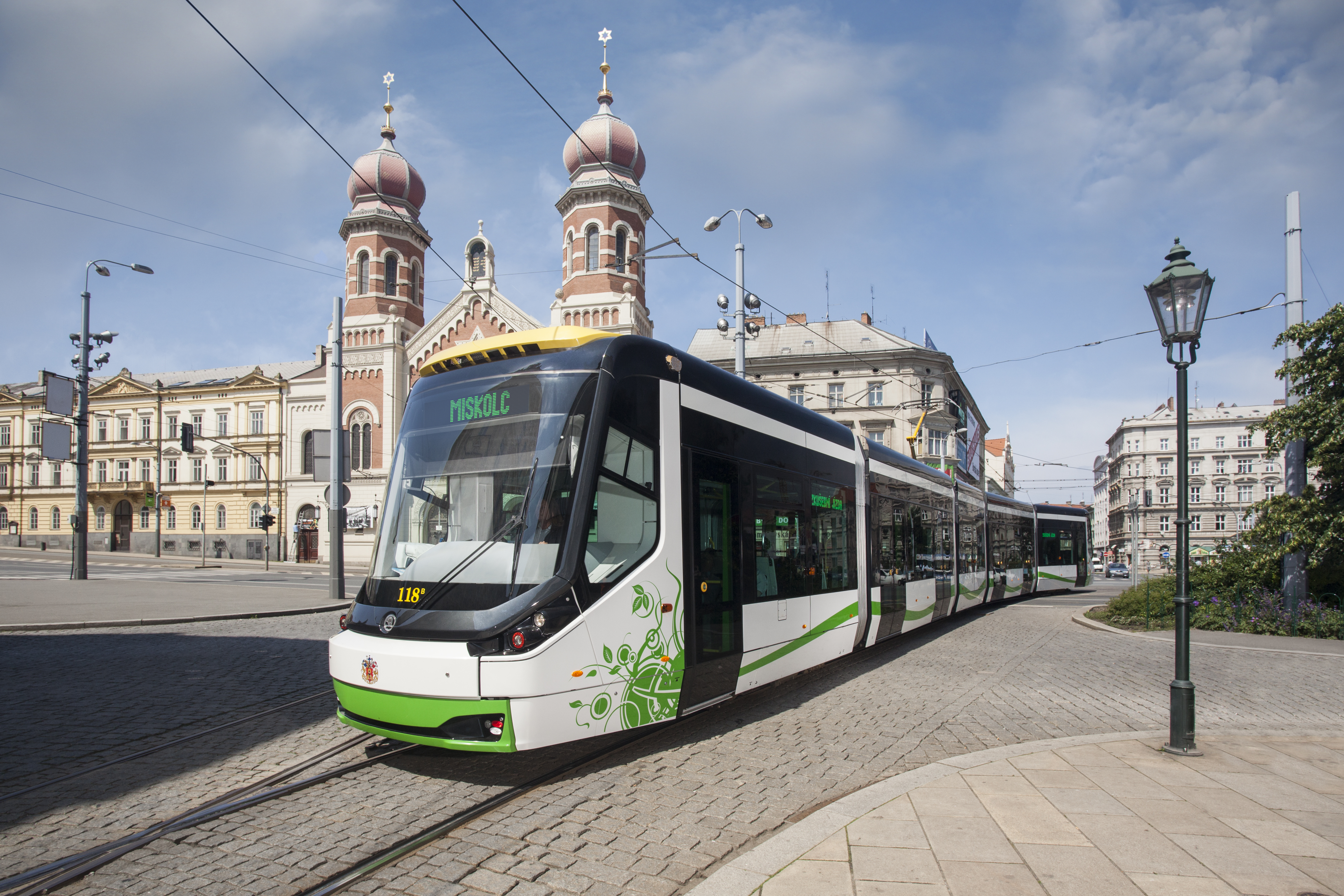
- The original 26T passing by during testing in Plzeň on 13 June 2013
- Stock type: Electric multiple unit
- Manufacturer: Škoda Transportation
- Designer: Aufeer Design
- Assembly: Plzeň, Czech Republic
- Family name: Škoda ForCity
- Constructed: 2012-2014
- Number built: 31
- Predecessor: Škoda 19 T
- Successor: Škoda 28 T
- Capacity: 300 passengers

Specifications
- Train length: 32.1 m (105 ft)
- Width: 2.65 m (8.7 ft)
- Low-floor: 100%
- Doors: 8 double doors, 4 single doors
- Articulated sections: 4 (5 body sections)
- Bogies: 3 x fixed

The Škoda 26T (trade name ForCity Classic, originally designated 25T) is a low floor five carbody section bidirectional tram, developed by Škoda Transportation for Miskolc, Hungary. After Škoda won the contract to build trams for Miskolc, the Miskolc transport authority ordered 31 units, which were produced between 2013 and 2015.

== Design ==
The tram concept allowed for variability; it was possible to produce various cars with three to seven sections, which were in lengths from 18–50 metres (59–164 feet), while the sections themselves could be of several lengths. At the customer's request, a three-section tram could also be produced with six driving bogies. All 31 trams were painted with "organic green flowers motif on a white background", chosen by the residents of Miskolc. The 26T is the basis for the Škoda 30T for Bratislava.

The tram's design is based on the Škoda 14 T, which operates in Prague, and was designed by Aufeer Design. The trams are low-floor five-unit bidirectional trams, which can be driven forward and backward, with three two-axle bogies, of which the front and the back bogies are driving, and the middle bogie is non-powered. The trams have liquid-crystal display passenger information screens. The total capacity of the fully air-conditioned car is 300 passengers; the price for one tram is 55 million Czech koruna.

== Development, delivery and service ==
The development of the 26T began in autumn 2010. Škoda Transportation won the contract in November 2011 to build trams for Miskolc out of four other competitors, including Spanish manufacturer Construcciones y Auxiliar de Ferrocarriles (CAF) and Italian manufacturer Ansaldo Breda. The production of the first prototype began in July 2012. The first prototype of the tram (designated Škoda 26THU3) was completed in February 2013. On 12 May 2013, the tram was assembled in the morning at the Slovany depot in Plzeň with the registration number 118; from where it performed test runs without passengers on the Plzeň network. The test runs were completed on 7 July, after which the car returned to Škoda, from where it was transported to Miskolc in August after minor modifications. The prototype received the registration number 600.

The first tram to be delivered to Hungary on 2 July 2013 was the second prototype, which was completed in June 2013, marked in Miskolc with the registration number 601. During the autumn, tests followed in Miskolc, the cars were approved for operation, and on 20 January 2014, tram no. 600 was first dispatched for regular passenger service. The 26T replaced various older trams, including the Tatra KT8D5, in Miskolc. A total of 31 trams were made. In February 2016, all 31 trams had travelled 2,000,000 kilometres (1,200,000 miles) combined.
