= Škoda 52 T =

Czech tram

Škoda 52T
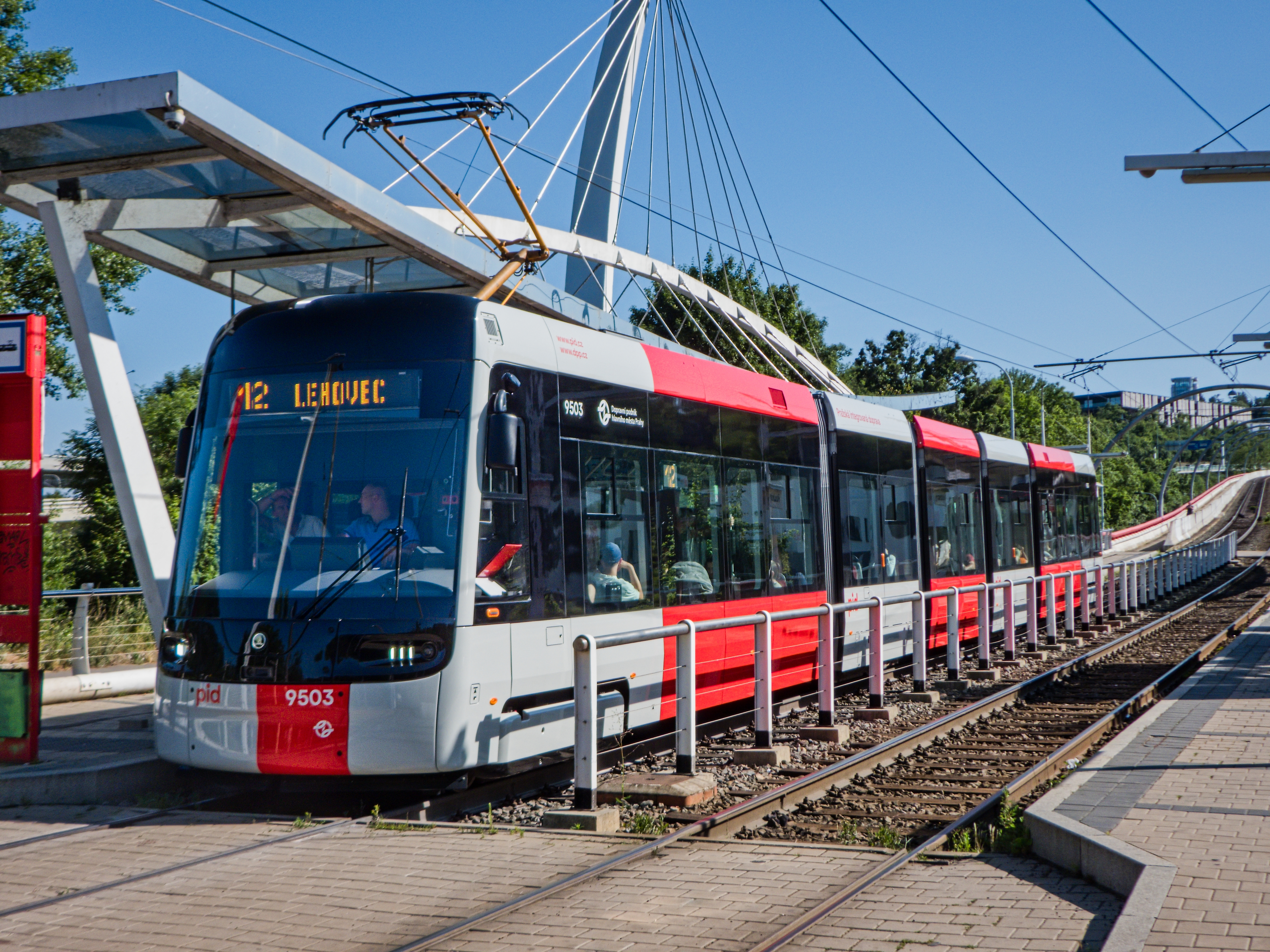
- Škoda 52T at Hlubočepy
- Manufacturer: Škoda Transportation
- Assembly: Plzeň, Czech Republic
- Family name: Škoda ForCity
- Constructed: 2025–present
- Capacity: 70 seated, 173 standing

Specifications
- Train length: 31.8 m (104 ft)
- Width: 2.5 m (8 ft 2 in)
- Floor height: 350 mm
- Low-floor: 100%
- Articulated sections: 5
- Maximum speed: 70 km/h (43 mph) (design)
- Bogies: 4 traction bogies (2 freely pivoting and 2 partially pivoting)
- Track gauge: 1,435 mm (4 ft 8 1/2 in)

Škoda 52T (marketed as the Škoda ForCity Plus 52T), is a five-section, single-ended, fully low-floor tram manufactured by Škoda Transportation for the Prague tram network. Developed specifically for Prague as part of Škoda's ForCity Plus family, it is a new-generation design with four powered bogies, electromechanical and regenerative braking, and a lidar-based collision-avoidance system.

The type entered regular passenger service in November 2025. The Prague Public Transit Company has ordered 71 vehicles under a framework agreement for up to 200 trams.

== Design ==
The 52T is a five-section, single-ended tram developed for the Prague tram network, including its tight curves and steep gradients. It is 31.99 m (104 ft 11 in) long and 2.5 m (8 ft 2 in) wide.

The tram has a fully low-floor interior and runs on four powered bogies. The two outer bogies are freely pivoting, while the two inner bogies are partially pivoting. The entrance height is 350 mm (14 in), and no steps are required to reach any of the seats.

Braking is primarily electrodynamic, allowing energy to be recovered through regenerative braking, while electromechanical friction brakes supplement the system. The tram also has an anti-collision system using lidar, HD cameras and odometry with digital maps.

The air-conditioned passenger compartment uses R290 refrigerant and with 70 seats it has a total capacity of 243 passengers.

In 2026, the 52T received a Red Dot Award for Product Design.

== Development and procurement ==
In November 2022, the Prague Public Transit Company (DPP) launched a tender for up to 200 new single-ended, fully low-floor trams. Škoda Transportation and Stadler Rail submitted final bids, and Škoda was selected as the preferred supplier in November 2023.

DPP signed a framework agreement for up to 200 trams in December 2023, with an initial order for 40 vehicles. The design was finalized in May 2024, and production began at Škoda's Plzeň plant the following month.

=== Delivery ===
The first Škoda 52T arrived in Prague in April 2025 and began testing on the city's tram network. The first seven trams entered regular passenger service in November 2025, and all 20 vehicles from the first batch were in service by 14 December.

A further 20 trams were scheduled for delivery in 2026.
