= Škoda 35 T =

Tram vehicle

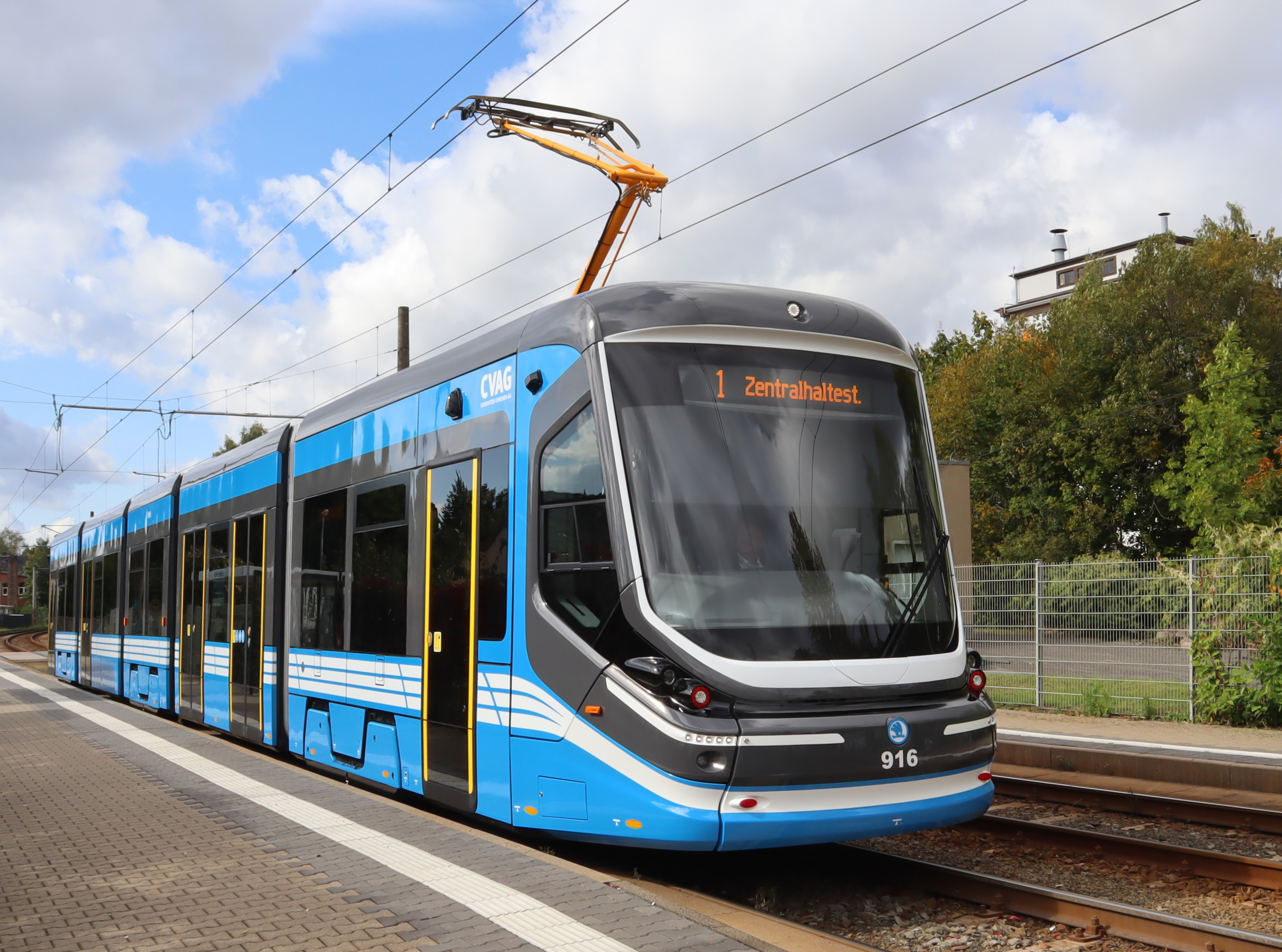
- Manufacturer: Škoda Transportation
- Designer: Aufeer Design
- Assembly: Plzeň, Czech Republic
- Family name: Škoda ForCity
- Constructed: 2018–2020
- Number built: 14
- Predecessor: Škoda 30 T
- Capacity: 64 (Seated); 135 (Standing)

Specifications
- Train length: 31,390 mm (1,236 in)
- Width: 2,650 mm (104 in)
- Height: 3,710 mm (146 in)
- Floor height: 290 mm (11.42 in)/350 mm (13.78 in)
- Low-floor: 100%
- Doors: 5+5
- Articulated sections: 4 (5 body sections)
- Maximum speed: 60 km/h (37 mph)
- Power output: 560 kW (750 hp)
- Track gauge: 1,435 mm (4 ft 8 1/2 in)

Škoda 35 T (also known as Škoda ForCity Classic Chemnitz) is a five carbody section low-floor bi-directional tram, developed by Škoda Transportation for Chemnitz. The low-floor area of the fully airconditioned tram represents 100% of the entire vehicle floor. Chemnitzer Verkehrs-Aktiengesellschaft ordered 14 units in June 2016. All trams were delivered from December 2018 to April 2020.

== Vehicle design ==
The tram was designed by Czech company Aufeer Design (member of Matador Group). It consists five sections with three bogies. The doors are located both sides of the vehicle (5+5), the first doors are smaller. The total capacity of the fully air conditioned car is 281 passengers.
