= EsTram =

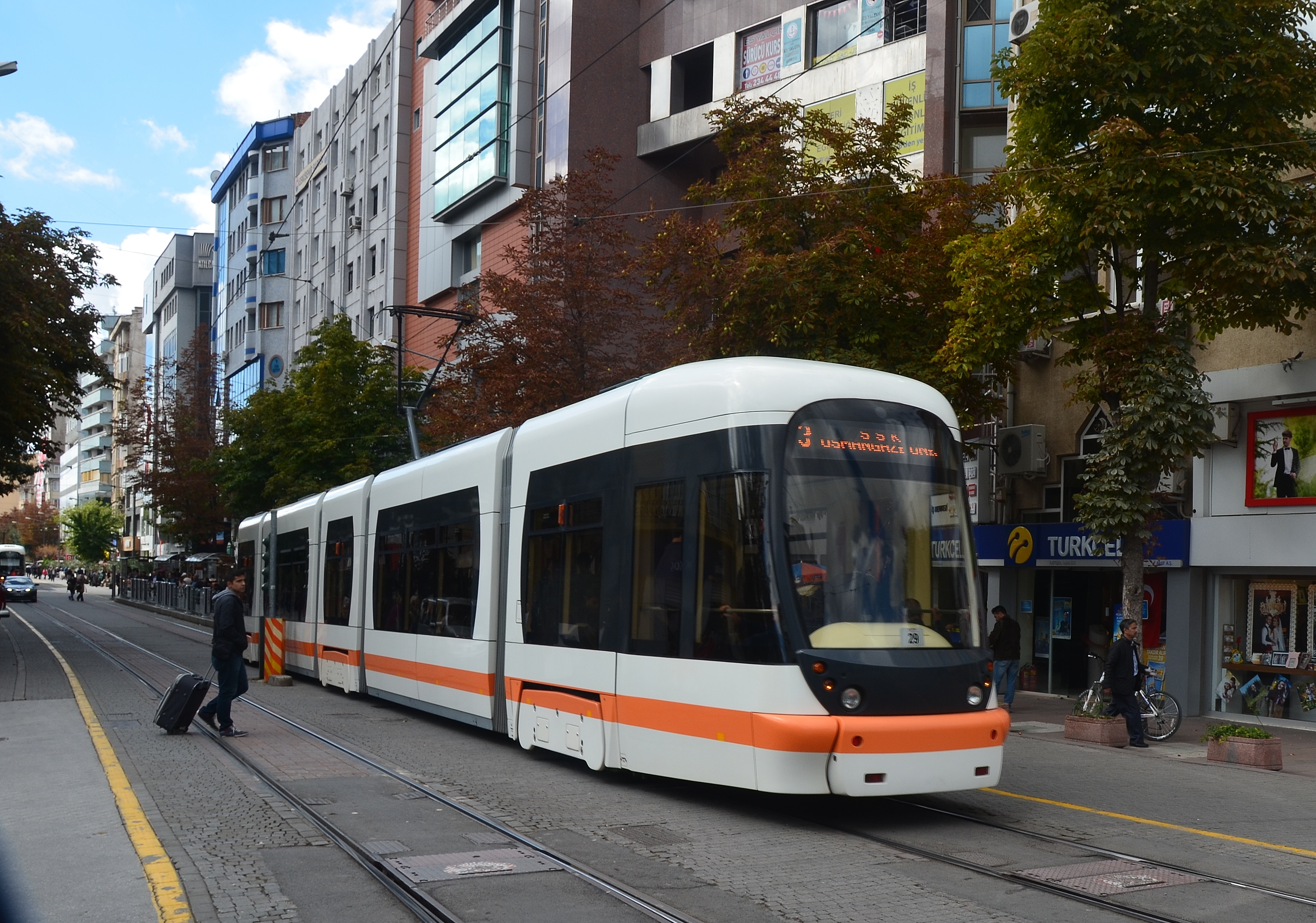

Overview
- Owner: Eskişehir Metropolitan Municipality
- Locale: Eskişehir
- Transit type: Tram
- Number of lines: 9
- Number of stations: 77
- Annual ridership: 39,986,332 (2022)
- Website: EsTram

Operation
- Began operation: 24 December 2004; 21 years ago
- Number of vehicles: Bombardier Flexity Outlook (33 vehicles), Škoda ForCity (14 vehicles)
- Train length: 29.5 m (96 ft 9 in)

Technical
- System length: 55 km (34 mi)
- Track gauge: 1,000 mm (3 ft 3 3/8 in) metre gauge
- Average speed: 50 km/h (30 mph)
- Top speed: 70 km/h (45 mph)
System map
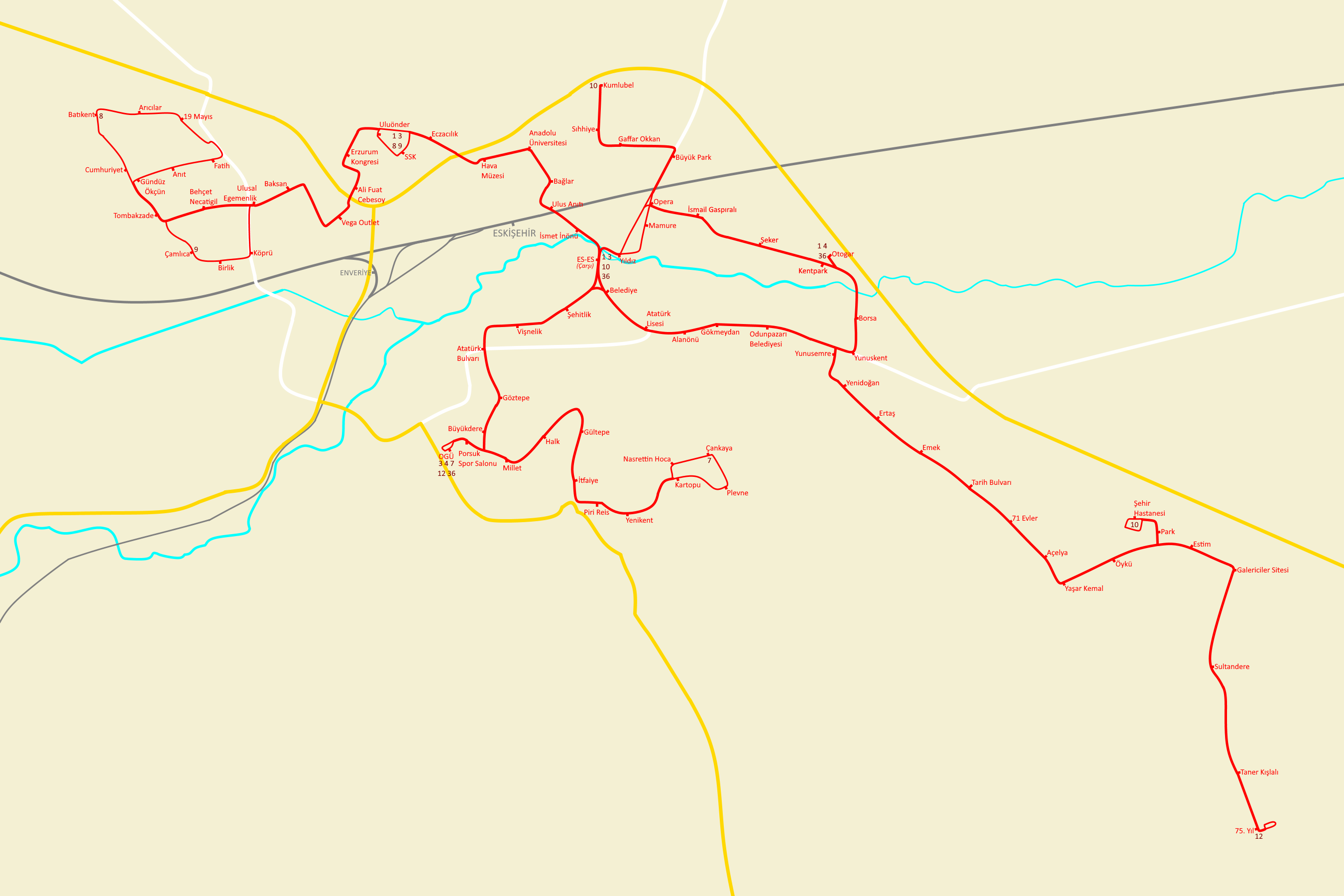

EsTram (Eskişehir Tramvay) is a tram network in Eskişehir, Turkey, owned by the Eskişehir Metropolitan Municipality. The system operates Bombardier Flexity Outlook and Škoda ForCity low-floor articulated light-rail trams.

The groundbreaking ceremony of the network was held on June 20, 2002, and operation of the first phase commenced on 24 December 2004 with a total length of 15 kilometers (9.3 mi) and two main lines, Otogar–SSK and Opera–Osmangazi University. The EsTram network is designed to carry passengers at a top speed of 50 km/h (31 mph) in mixed traffic.

In 2014, the second phase was completed with four extensions to the network. The newly added lines were Emek–71 Evler, Batıkent–SSK (ring), Çamlıca–SSK (ring) and Çankaya–Osmangazi University (ring). The Emek–71 Evler line was later extended by 3 kilometres (1.9 mi) on March 10, 2019, to reach the city hospital.

The third phase was completed in 2021 when the 75. Yıl–Sultandere and City Hospital–Kumlubel extensions were opened on 12 March and 14 June respectively. Service on line 36 (Otogar–Osmangazi University) (via Opera station) began on January 6, 2025. As of 2025, the system has nine lines.

== Lines ==
Line	Route	Length	Electrification	Stations	Notes
1	Otogar ↔ SSK		750V DC Overhead line	16	
3	Osmangazi Üniversitesi ↔ SSK		750V DC Overhead line	15	
4	Otogar ↔ Osmangazi Üniversitesi		750V DC Overhead line	15	
7	Osmangazi Üniversitesi ↔ Çankaya		750V DC Overhead line	12	
8	SSK ↔ Batıkent		750V DC Overhead line	15	
9	SSK ↔ Çamlıca		750V DC Overhead line	10	
10	Şehir Hastanesi ↔ Kumlubel		750V DC Overhead line	23	
12	75. Yıl ↔ Osmangazi Üniversitesi		750V DC Overhead line	26	
36	Otogar ↔ Osmangazi Üniversitesi (via Opera)		750V DC Overhead line	15	
TOTAL:		55 km		77	
