= Škoda 29 T =

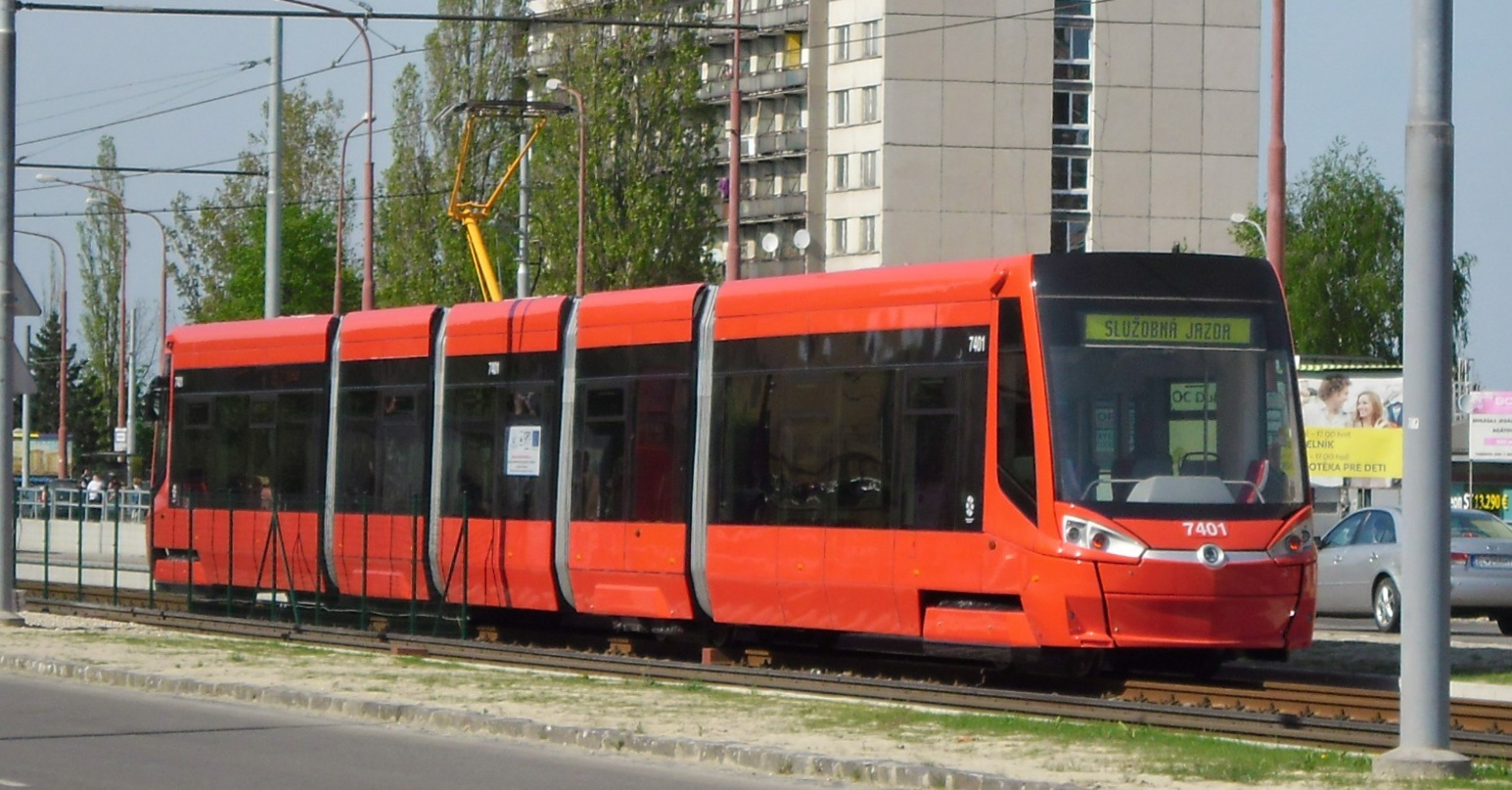
- Škoda 29 T tram deadheading (Slovak: Služobná jazda) in Bratislava
- Manufacturer: Škoda Transportation
- Assembly: Plzeň, Czech Republic; Ostrava, Czech Republic
- Family name: Škoda ForCity
- Constructed: 2014–2026
- Number built: 60 ordered
- Capacity: 63 – 69 (Seated); 276 – 299 (Standing)

Specifications
- Train length: 32,495 mm (1,279.3 in)
- Width: 2,480 mm (98 in)
- Height: 3,596 mm (141.6 in)
- Floor height: 350 mm (14 in)
- Low-floor: 88%
- Doors: 5
- Articulated sections: 4 (5 body sections)
- Maximum speed: limited to 65 km/h (40 mph)
- Power output: 600 kW
- Track gauge: 1,000 mm (3 ft 3 3/8 in)

Škoda 29 T (also ForCity Plus) is a five car-body low-floor uni-directional tram, developed by Škoda Transportation for the Bratislava tram system based on an earlier model 15 T, respectively 03 T.

== Vehicle design ==
The tram is a five section fully air-conditioned high capacity electric multiple unit with four bogies and five doors on the right-hand side of the carriage. 88% of the tram is a low-floor area. Two of the four bogies are fixed and the outer two can pivot to adapt to curvature of the track. One of the inner and both outer bogies have driving axles. The tram has operator's controls at the front end, the driver cabin has air conditioning, fridge and equipment to switch the points manually. The tram is controlled with a hand controller.

== Tram controls ==
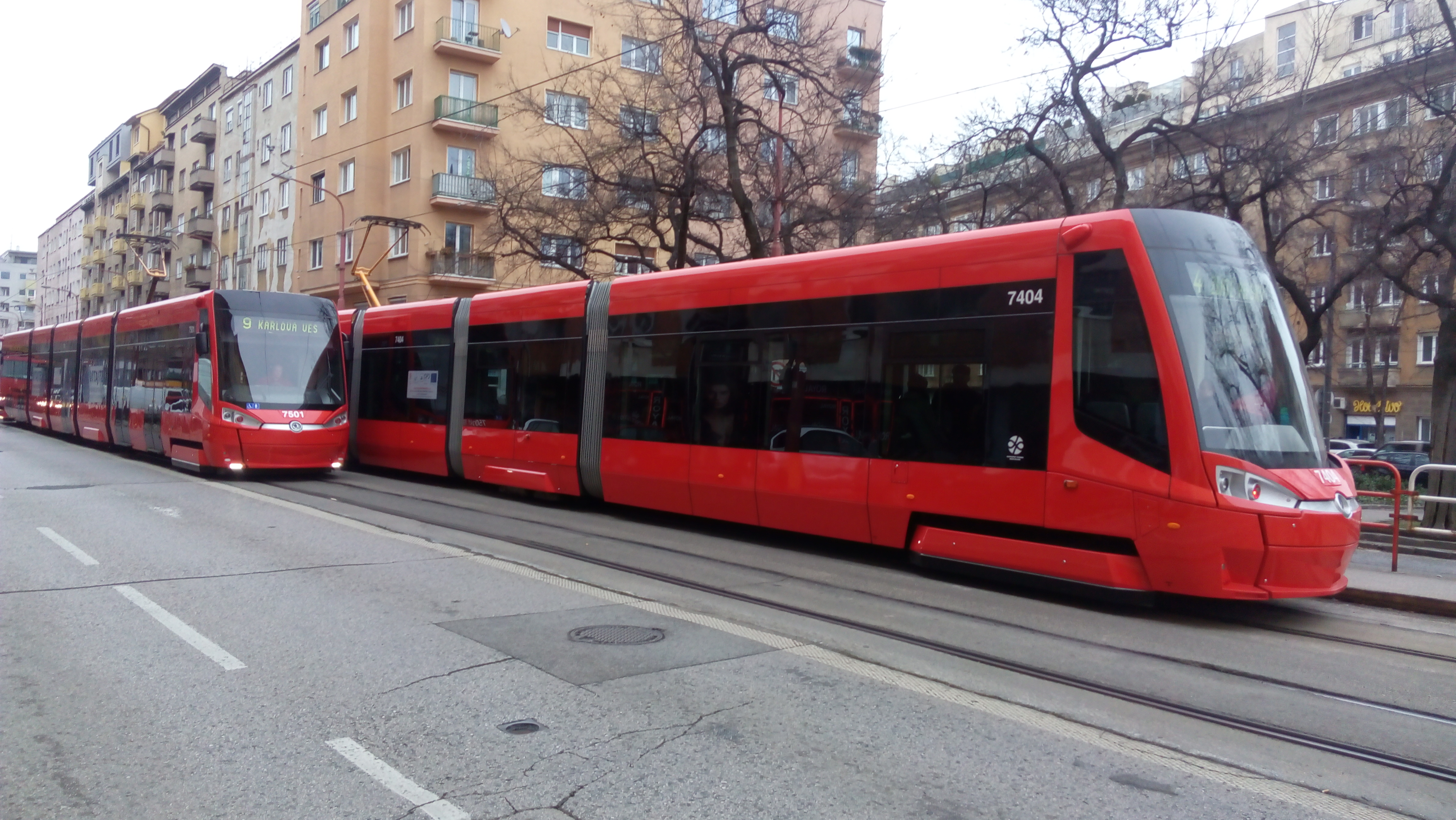
Škoda 29 T on line 9 to Karlova Ves and line 4 to Zlaté piesky in Krížna street in Bratislava

The hand controller is the main way of controlling the tram. It has an integrated dead-man feature and two buttons on each side (left button controls the light signals, right button controls the bell). The bell can be activated with the button on the control panel, or with the right pedal. The left pedal activates sanding. The vehicle computer and the on-board computer BUSE BS 301 are both controlled by a touchscreen. The vehicle computer diagnoses the tram, displays the speedometer, gives access to the sander status and more. The on-board computer BUSE BS 301 takes care of the camera system, ticket validation machines, manages the outside and inside displays and controls the acoustic announcement system, as well as the dispatch system and the point controls. The on-board computer has GPS, the stops are announced automatically according to the GPS position, the door status (open or closed) and the distance travelled.

The vehicle is equipped with 3 types of brakes: electrodynamic (standard), electromagnetic (emergency) and disc brakes (used to bring the tram to 0 km/h).

Electrodynamic brakes can bring the tram to as low as 5 km/h and they recover the energy gained from braking and return it into the electric network.

Electromagnetic brakes are to be only used in emergency situations. There are 8 electromagnetic brakes in the vehicle. These electromagnetic brakes can be activated with either a button (used mainly for testing), when emergency brake button is pressed, or when the hand controller is pushed back entirely.

Disc brakes are used to bring the tram into a complete stop. They are equipped with wheel slide protection.

The tram is able to operate without electricity, up to 700 meters can be travelled on emergency batteries.

The maximum speed is limited by either the driver or by the tram itself. The default tram limit is set to 90 km/h, but the transport company of Bratislava set it to 65 km/h. The vehicle computer does not allow to disable the 90 km/h limit. The on-board computer keeps track of the speed of the tram.

== Interior ==
The interior for the passengers is equipped with air-conditioning, Wi-Fi, automatic touch-enabled ticket validation machines, 12 Full-HD displays displaying stops, acoustic announcement system and a heating system. There are 5 doors on the right-hand side of the tram. Doors will open on demand (passenger has to push a button). Above each door, there is an infrared photosensor system which can be used to count passengers boarding the tram. It can be used to automatically close the doors, if no passenger has passed through for a certain amount of time.

== Deliveries ==
Country	City	Number of vehicles	Years	Numbers
Slovakia	Bratislava	60	2015–2026	7401–7460

First Škoda 29 T tram #7401 was put in service on 27 April 2015 assigned to the route 4.
