= Škoda Artic =

Articulated low-floor tram manufactured by Škoda Transtech

Artic
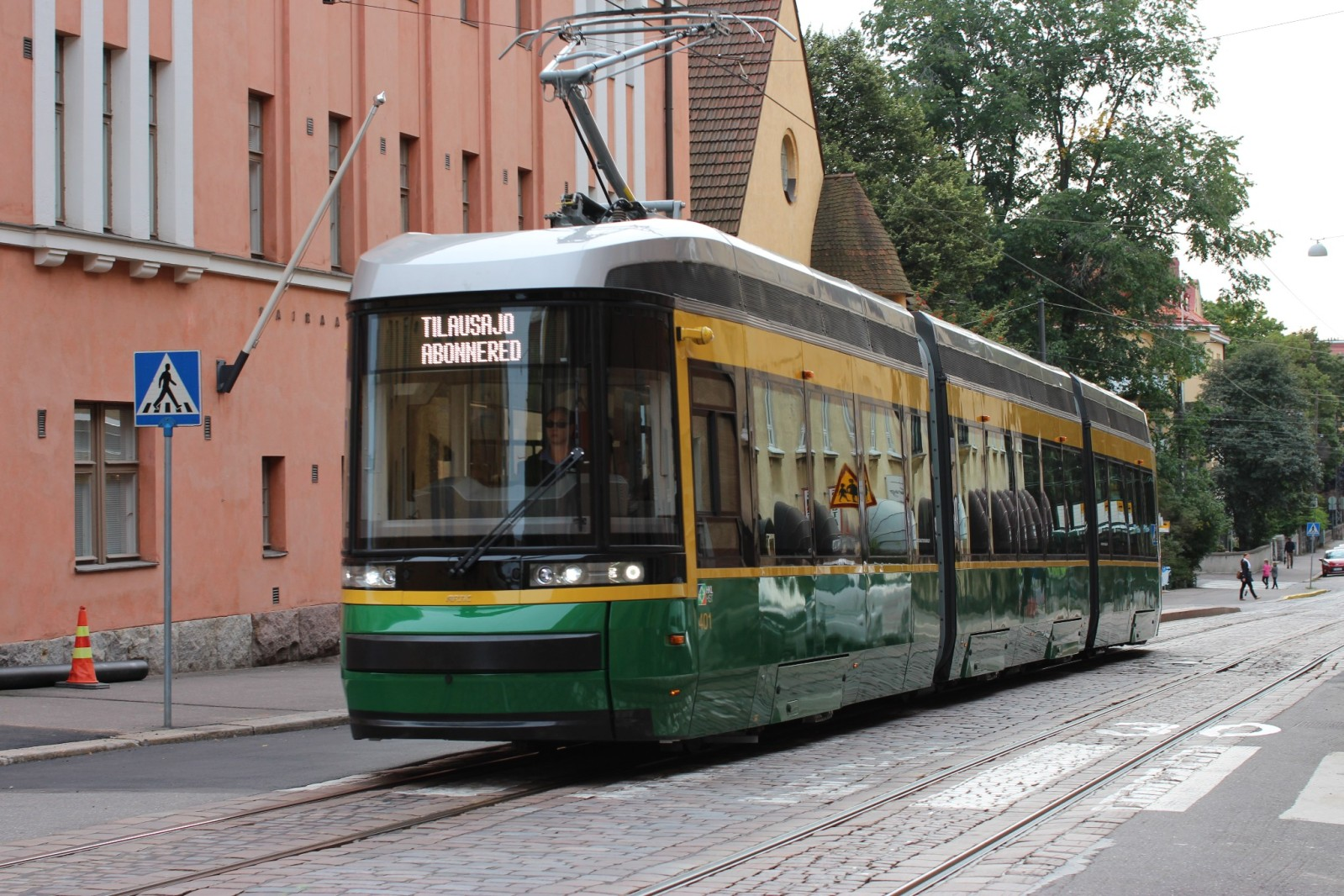
- In service: 2013–present
- Manufacturer: Škoda Transtech Oy
- Built at: Otanmäki, Kajaani
- Family name: Škoda ForCity
- Constructed: 2012–
- Entered service: 2013
- Number built: 50 (June 2018)
- Number in service: 49
- Fleet numbers: HKL 401–470
- Capacity: 88 seats, 75–125 standing (low-floor)
- Operator: Metropolitan Area Transport

Specifications
- Car length: 27.6 m (90 ft 7 in)
- Width: 2.4 m (7 ft 10 in)
- Height: 3.83 m (12 ft 7 in) with pantograph
- Floor height: 0.36 m (1 ft 2 in) (doorstep); 0.52 m (1 ft 8 in) (max)
- Maximum speed: 80 km/h (50 mph)
- Weight: 41.6 t (40.9 long tons; 45.9 short tons)
- Power output: 8×65 kW
- Track gauge: 1,000 mm (3 ft 3 3/8 in)

Artic, styled as ARTIC or ForCity Smart, is an articulated low-floor tram model designed and manufactured by Škoda Transtech Oy in Finland. Trams of the design are in operation in Finland, Germany and Czechia, with further large orders in these countries. The design was subsequently rebranded under the Škoda ForCity brand.

== Models ==
=== Artic MLNRV-3 (Helsinki) ===
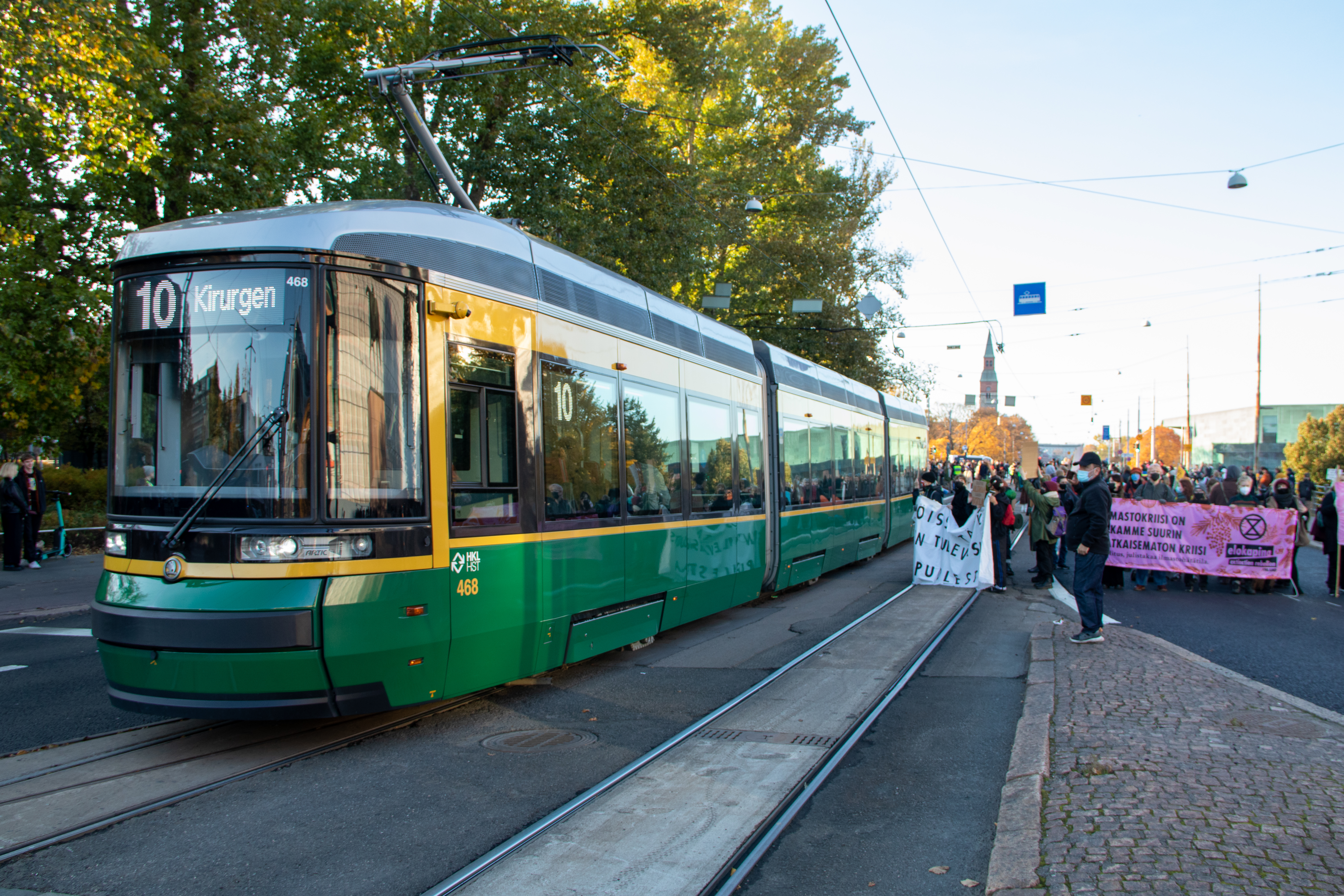
An Artic tram in Helsinki, on Line 10

In December 2010 the design was included in the winning tender to deliver 40 new trams to the Helsinki City Transport (HKL), the municipal tram operator of Helsinki Regional Transport Authority (HSL), with an option for 90 units more. The winning bid was worth €113 million, which makes the unit cost of the initial agreement €2.8 million per tram.

The first unit was rolled out in the summer of 2013 and taken to line operation for testing purposes in the autumn of 2013. The second unit was delivered in November 2013, and these two units will be thoroughly tested before the manufacturing of the remaining 38 units will begin in late 2015. All the units will be delivered by 2018.

The technical design is based on free-turning bogies, which was rarely seen in low-floor trams before. The tram network in Helsinki, which has many sharp turns and switches and steep gradients, poses a challenge for many low-floor tram designs, which made the Variotram design ill-suited for the network. To remedy these problems, Helsinki City Transport itself made preliminary design for a new low-floor model, and this design work was also the foundation of the Artic tram. The design claims to move more smoothly and quietly in sharp turns and switches and wear down the tram wheels less.

All the axles (eight in the first model) in Artic are powered by an independent motor of 65 kW, and the tram is tested for speeds up to 80 kilometres per hour (50 mph). The tram is equipped with a regenerative braking system. In the Helsinki version the energy is used for heating, but the design is also ready to be equipped with supercapacitors.

By June 2018, HKL has used all three of its options for extra units. First option was used in 2016 for 20 additional units (numbers 441–460) for the existing Helsinki network and they are to be delivered by the end of 2018. The second option was also used in 2016 for 29 additional units (numbers 601–629), but this time for the future Raide-Jokeri light rail connecting the cities of Helsinki and Espoo. The Raide-Jokeri Artic X54 trams differ from the rest in many ways: They are 34.5 metres (113 ft) long, bi-directional, have a capacity of 214 passengers (78+4 seated, 136 standing, 4 persons/m^{2}), and consist of five modules instead of three in the basic model. The Artic XL trams can also be lengthened to be up to 44 metres (144 ft) long with a capacity of 287 passengers (100+8 seated, 187 standing). The first Artic XL tram was used in the existing Helsinki network for testing and was delivered in 2021, while the production of the series will began in 2021. The last option was used in June 2018 for 10 more units (numbers 461–470) of the basic Artic model for the expanding network in the coming years. These vehicles were delivered by the end of 2019. That makes a total of 99 Artic trams ordered and/or delivered for Helsinki City Transport (HKL).

In October 2018 Škoda Transtech sold the two Artic pre-series trams to the Schöneiche bei Berlin tramway (Tram 88). A further order of one brand new Škoda Artic tram was placed in April 2019. As such, both the first built and last built Helsinki-style Artic trams operate in Germany on the Schöneiche/Rüdersdorf route.

=== Artic X34 (Tampere) ===
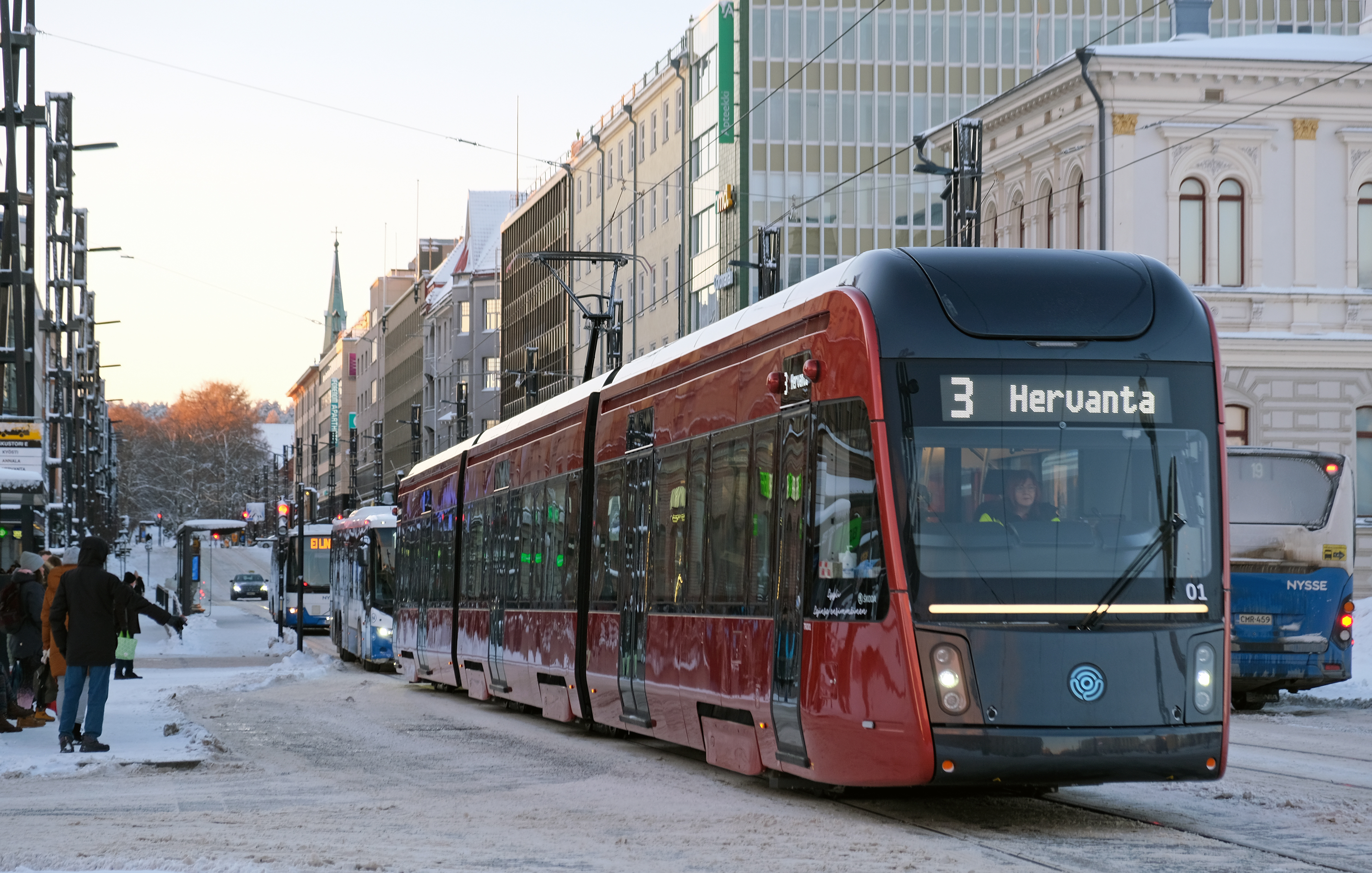
Artic X34 tram in Tampere

Bi-directional Artic trams also operate in the city of Tampere in Finland for the Tampere light rail system which opened in 2021. A total of 19 units (with an option for an additional 46 units for future expansions) were delivered during 2020 and 2021 for the city-owned company Tampere Tramway Ltd (Tampereen Raitiotie Oy), which owns, maintains and develops the network and rolling stock. The Tampere light rail has a standard gauge of 1,435 mm (4 ft 8 1/2 in) and the trams are 2.65 metres (8.7 ft) wide. The vehicles are 37 metres (121 ft) long and can be lengthened to be up to 47 metres (154 ft). The Artic light rail vehicles for Tampere have a capacity of 264 passengers (64+40 seated, 200 standing, 4 persons/m^{2}).

In 2024 a contract with Škoda was signed to elongate 19 cars by one section to four-section trams. The first of the longer modified trams will enter service in 2027

=== Artic X54 (Helsinki) ===
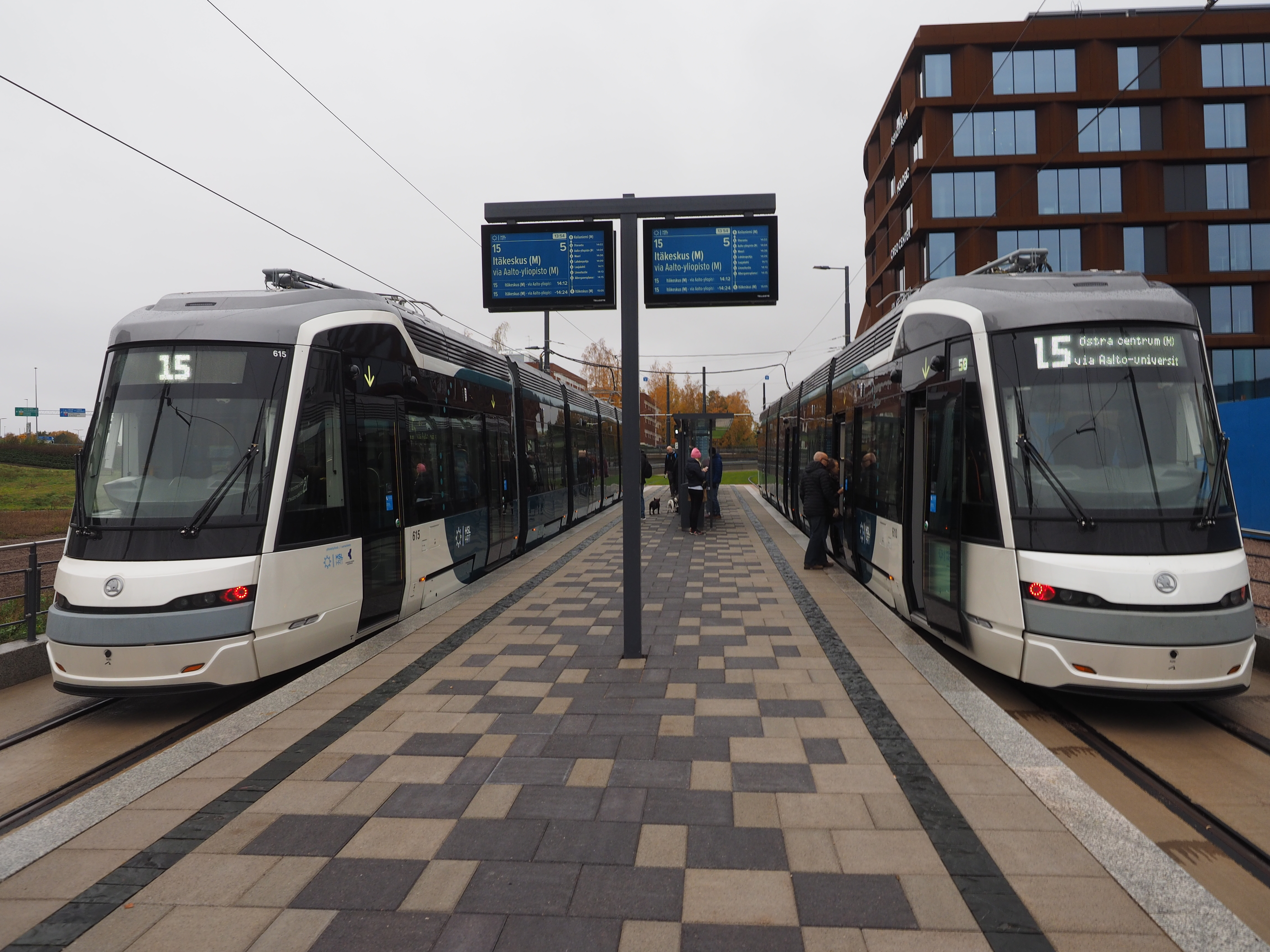
Two ForCity Smart Artic X54 units on the western terminus of light rail line 15 in Keilaniemi, Espoo

Helsinki City Transport, the predecessor of Metropolitan Area Transport, has ordered 29 bi-directional Artic X54 units for Helsinki light rail line 15 and 23 for the Crown Bridges light rail lines. The first prototype unit arrived in Helsinki in April 2021.

=== Škoda 36T/37T/38T (Heidelberg, Mannheim/Ludwigshafen) ===
In June 2018 Škoda won a tender for Rhein-Neckar-Verkehr GmbH to deliver 80 bi-directional Artic trams for use in the large metre-gauge network covering Mannheim/Ludwigshafen and Heidelberg. The contract consisted of thirty-one 30-metre (98 ft) Škoda 36T trams (three modules), thirty-seven 40-metre (130 ft) Škoda 37T trams (four modules) and twelve 60-metre (200 ft) Škoda 38T trams (six modules). An option in the contract for additional vehicles was used in 2024 to order thirty-four more 36T trams. The four- and six-module trams are formed from two shorter single-ended units which can be split in the workshop for maintenance. The six-module trams are the longest trams in the world.

=== Škoda 39T (Ostrava) ===
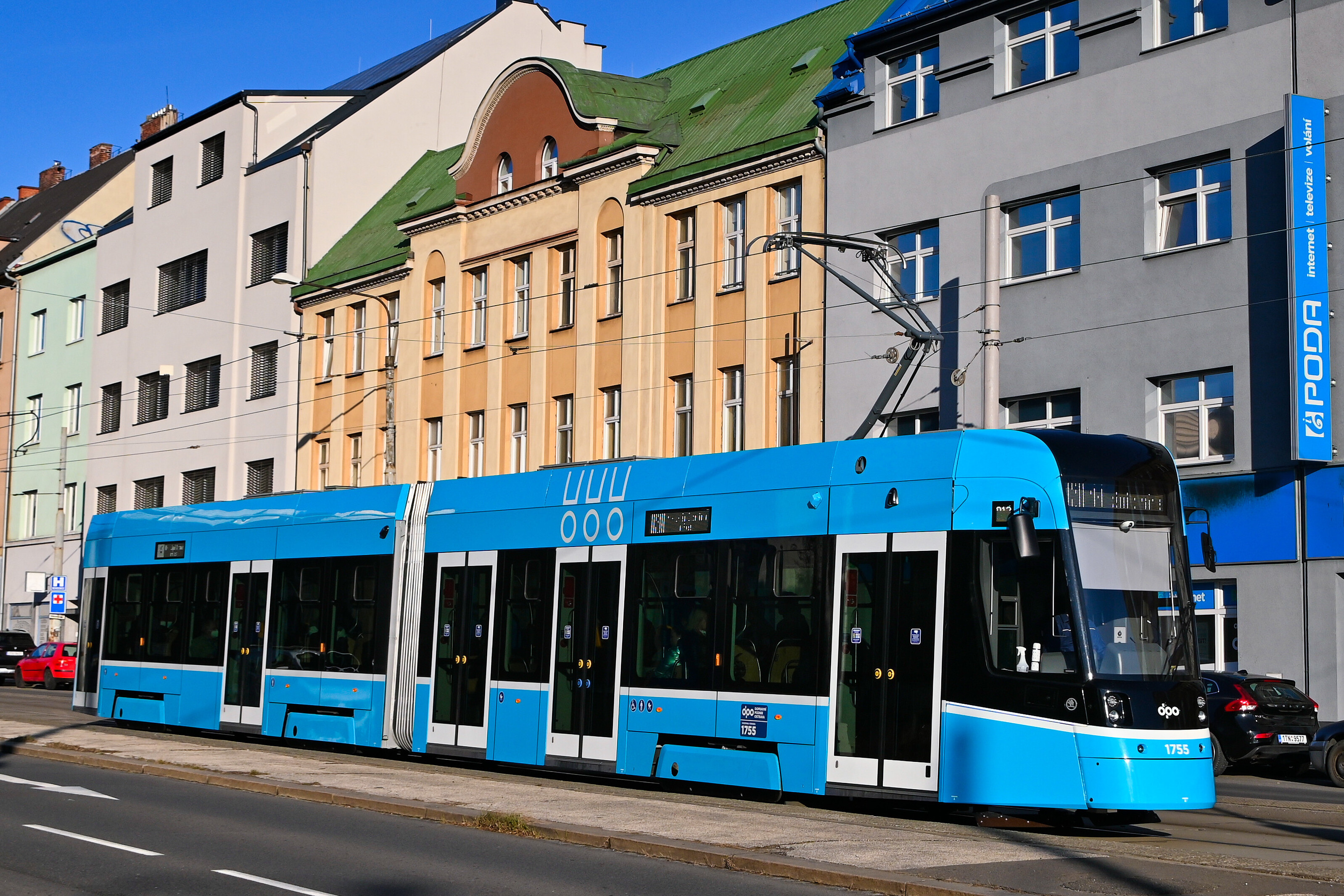
Škoda 39T tram in Ostrava

In September 2018 Škoda Transportation signed a contract with the city transport company of Ostrava for 40 two-section Škoda 39T (also known as Škoda ForCity Smart Ostrava) trams. The vehicles will be 26.5 metres (87 ft) long with a capacity of 200 passengers. The first tram was to be delivered in the third quarter of 2020, but due to the COVID-19 pandemic, delivery was postponed to October 2021.

=== Škoda 40T (Plzeň) ===
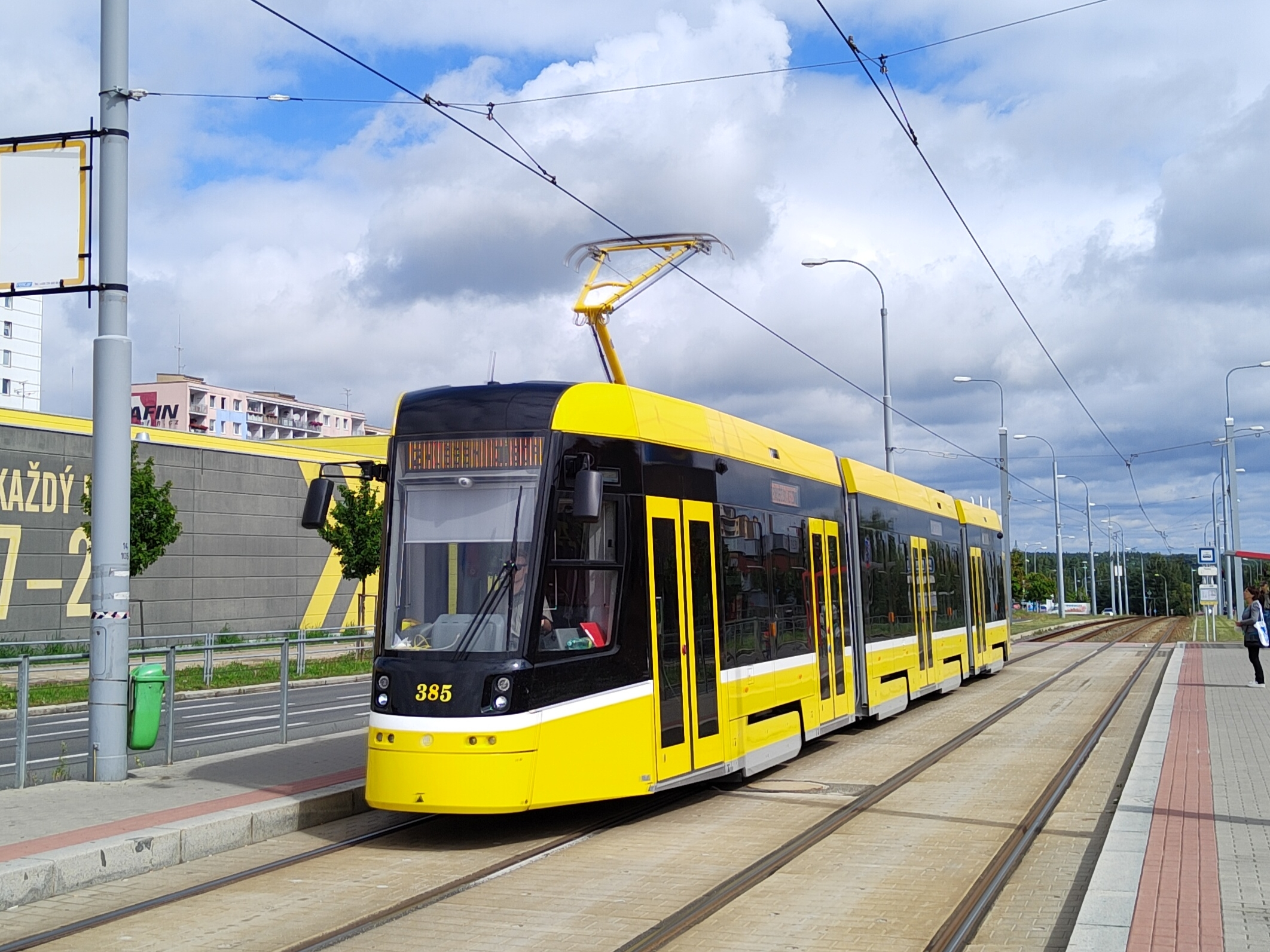
Škoda 40T tram in Plzeň

In October 2018 the city transport company of Plzeň ordered 2 three-section bi-directional Škoda 40T (also known as Škoda ForCity Smart Plzeň) trams with an option for 20 additional vehicles. The total capacity of 29-metre-long (95 ft) tram will be 185 passengers. The trams will be 100% low-floor and fully air-conditioned. The first tram was to be delivered in October 2020, but due to the COVID-19 pandemic, delivery was postponed to July 2021.
