= Konya Tram =

Tram system in Konya, Turkey

Konya Tramway
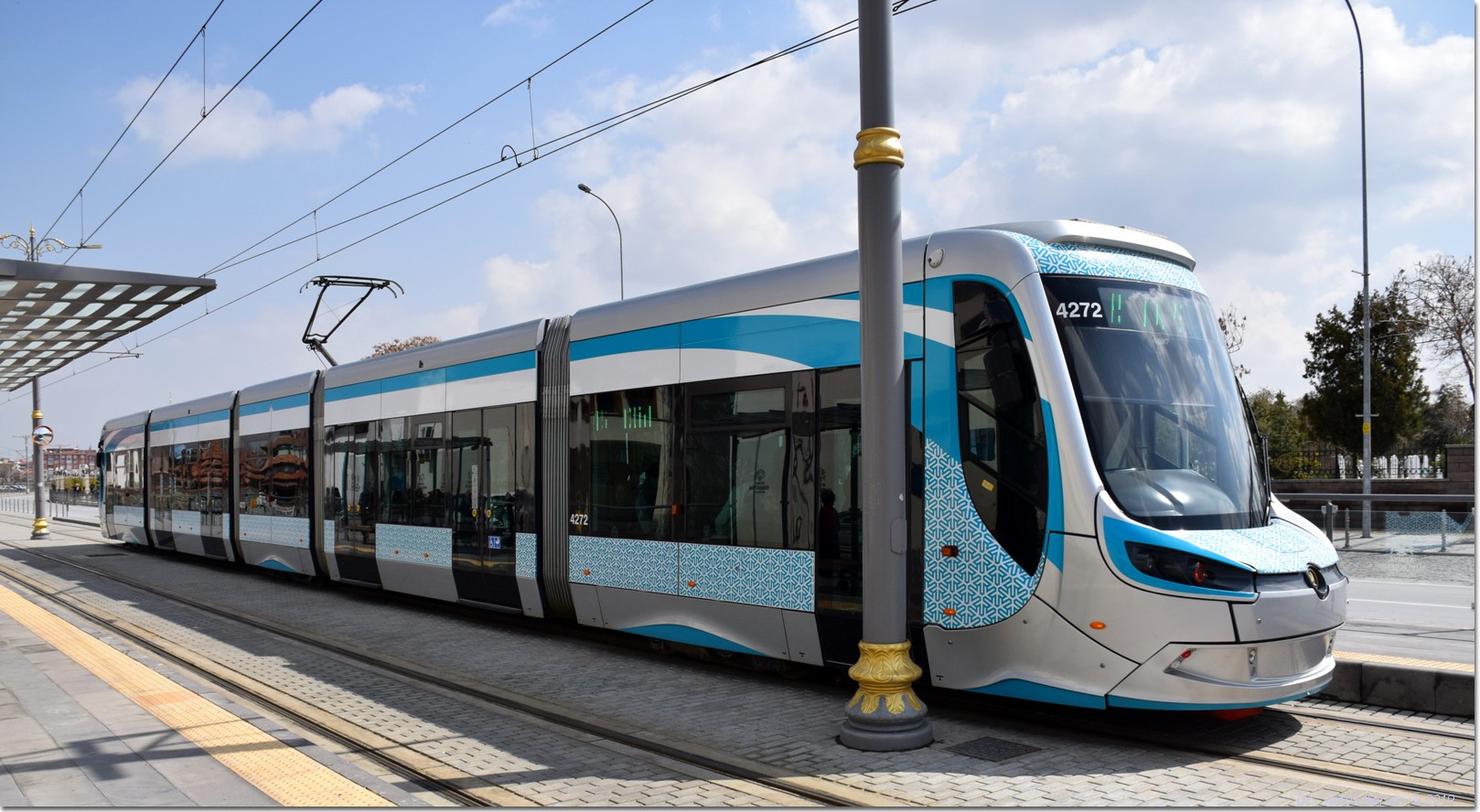

Overview
- Native name: Konya Tramvayı
- Owner: Konya Metropolitan Municipality
- Locale: Konya, Turkey
- Transit type: Tramway
- Number of lines: 2
- Number of stations: 41
- Daily ridership: 104,000
- Website: https://atus.konya.bel.tr

Operation
- Began operation: 1992 (Line 1) 1999 (Extension of line 1 to Selçuk University) 2015 (Line 2)
- Number of vehicles: 72

Technical
- System length: 21(Line 1) + 6.2(Line 2) = 27.2km
- Track gauge: 1,435 mm (4 ft 8 1/2 in)
- Average speed: 45
- Top speed: 70
System map
Diagram of the tramway network (in Turkish)

The Konya Tram is a tram system located in the city of Konya in Turkey. Konya's first tram line was opened on 15 April 1992. The system is 41 km long with two lines, and has 41 stations. The network is among the most heavily used in Turkey.

== History ==
In 1987, the Konya Metropolitan Municipality announced plans for a new light rail network in order to provide safe, cheap and fast transportation to citizens of the city. Construction of the first phase of Line One began in 1987. After 5 years of construction work, the Alaaddin-Republic line was opened for public use. In 1996, this line was extended to the northern district of Selcuklu and Selcuk University. In 2015, the Alaaddin-Adliye line was put into service.

== Operation ==
The network consists of two lines operated with a total of 72 Škoda Forcity Classic 28T vehicles. An underground rail system, the Konya Metro, is under construction and will connect with the tram at Meram Beledeysi and Konya Railway Station. The Konya Tram carries an average of 104,000 riders daily. The tram operates between 6:00 and 24:00 every day of the year.

== Lines ==
| Line | Route | Opening | Length (km) | Number of stations |
|---|---|---|---|---|
| One | Aladdin – Selcuk University | April 15 1992 | 36.7 | 33 |
| Two | Aladdin – Courthouse | September 12 2015 | 4.4 | 9 |

=== Line One ===
Line One of the Konya Tram runs north to south from the center of Konya to the northern suburbs of the city known as Selçuklu. The line terminates in the north at the campus of Selçuk University. The line consists of 32 stations, runs 21 km and was opened for use in two phases. Phase one opened in 1992 and it was running only between "Otogar" and "Alaaddin". Phase two opened in 1999 which was an extension to Selçuk Üniversity and Alaaddin. Transfers between Lines One and Two are available at Zafer and Alaaddin in Konya's City Center. "Kültürpark" Station of line one was removed in July 30th 2025.

| Name | Station | District |
|---|---|---|
| 1 | Zafer | Selçuklu |
| 2 | Alaaddin | Meram |
| 3 | Belediye | Selçuklu |
| 4 | Nalçacı | Selçuklu |
| 5 | Kule | Selçuklu |
| 6 | Kunduracılar | Selçuklu |
| 7 | Eski Sanayi | Selçuklu |
| 8 | Aydınlık Evler | Selçuklu |
| 9 | Şehitler Cami | Selçuklu |
| 10 | Sakarya | Selçuklu |
| 11 | Teknik Lise | Selçuklu |
| 12 | Organize Sanayi | Selçuklu |
| 13 | Eyüp Sultan | Selçuklu |
| 14 | Binkonutlar | Selçuklu |
| 15 | Erenkaya | Selçuklu |
| 16 | Otogar | Selçuklu |
| 17 | MEDAŞ | Selçuklu |
| 18 | Elmalı Hamdi | Selçuklu |
| 19 | MTA | Selçuklu |
| 20 | Yazır | Selçuklu |
| 21 | Japon Parkı | Selçuklu |
| 22 | Sancak | Selçuklu |
| 23 | Piri Reis | Selçuklu |
| 24 | Fırat Caddesi | Selçuklu |
| 25 | Buzlukbaşı Köprüsü | Selçuklu |
| 26 | Bosna Hersek | Selçuklu |
| 27 | Kayalar Cami | Selçuklu |
| 28 | Kampüs | Selçuklu |
| 29 | Tıp Fakültesi | Selçuklu |
| 30 | Mühendislik Fakültesi | Selçuklu |
| 31 | Fen Edebiyat Fakültesi | Selçuklu |
| 32 | Hukuk Fakültesi | Selçuklu |

=== Line Two ===
Line Two of the Konya Tram runs east to west forward to the center of Konya. The tram connects Zafer in the west to suburban Karatay in the east. The line consists of 9 stations, runs 6.2 km and was opened for use on September 29, 2015. Transfers between Lines One and Two are available at Zafer and Alaaddin. on September 9 2026, "Şehir Hastanesi" extention was open which was the first update in konya tram over 10 years. It is an extention to a state hospital.

| Name | Station | District |
|---|---|---|
| 1 | Zafer | Selçuklu |
| 2 | Alaaddin | Meram |
| 3 | Hükümet | Karatay |
| 4 | Mevlana | Karatay |
| 5 | Mevlana Kültür Merkezi | Karatay |
| 6 | Fetih Caddesi | Karatay |
| 7 | Spor ve Kongre Merkezi | Karatay |
| 8 | Karşehir Caddesi | Karatay |
| 9 | Adliye | Karatay |

|- | 10 | Şehir Hastanesi |}

== Gallery ==
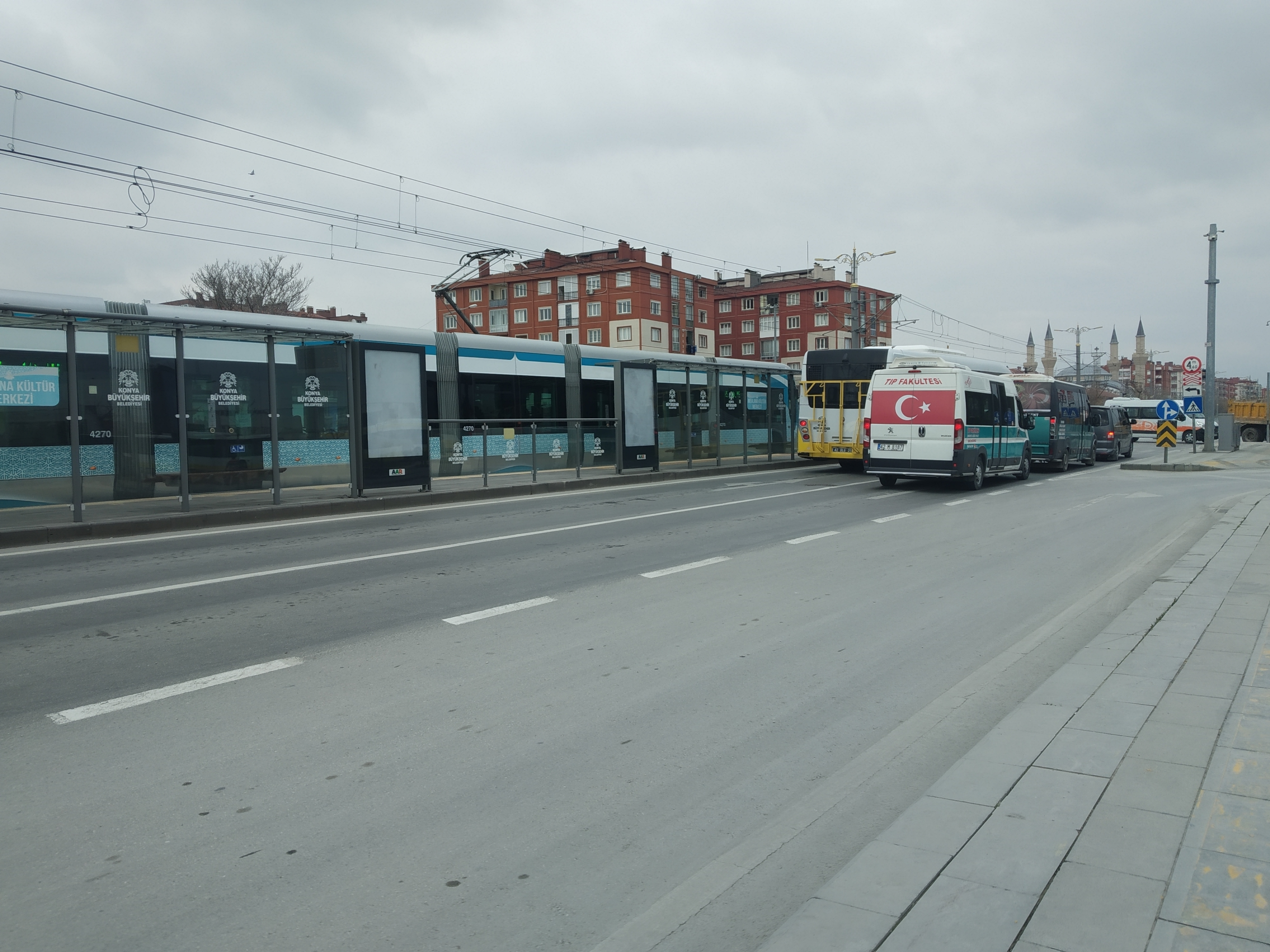
Line Two of the Konya Tram

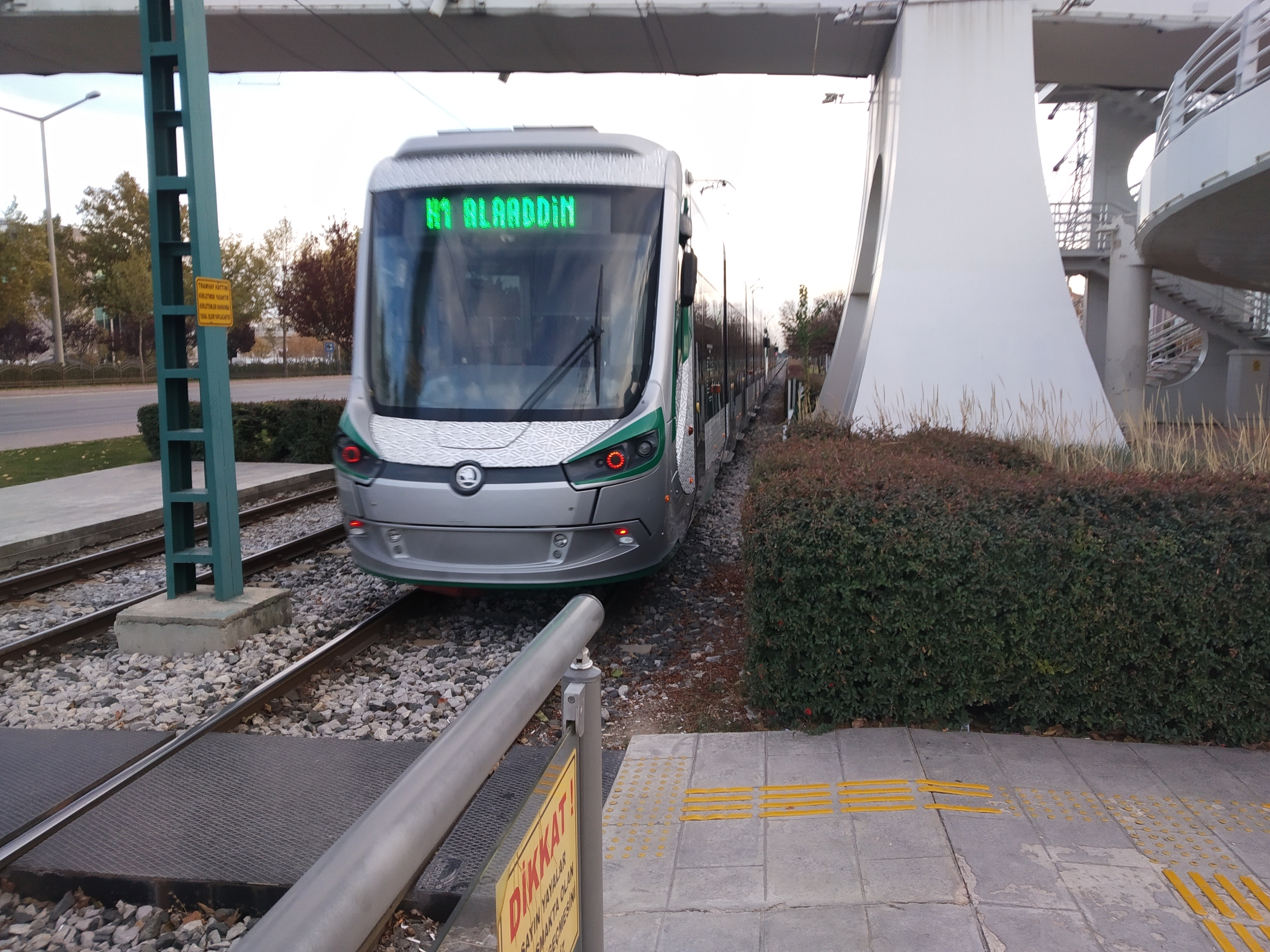
Konya Tram leaving a Station

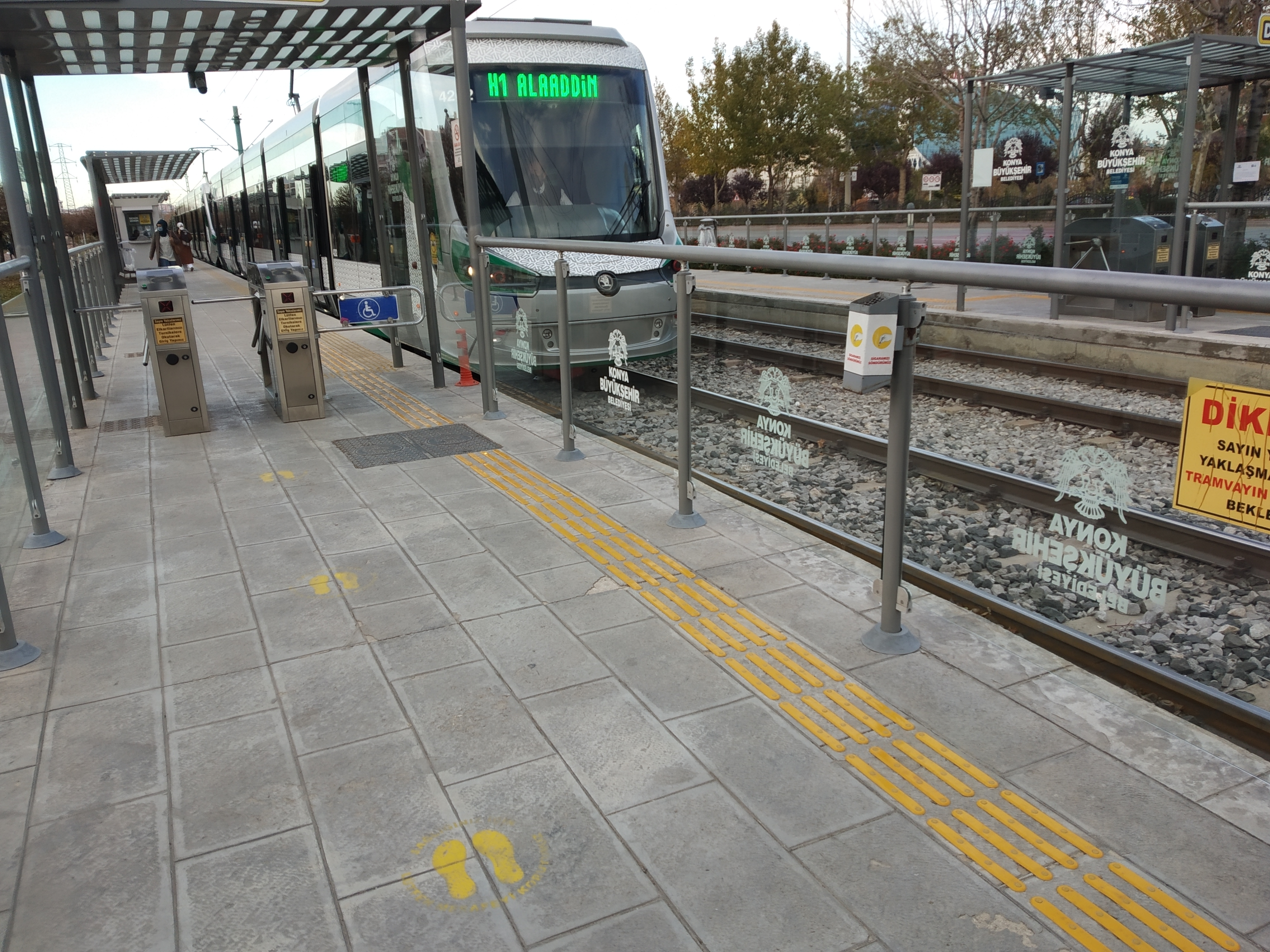
A Konya Tram Platform

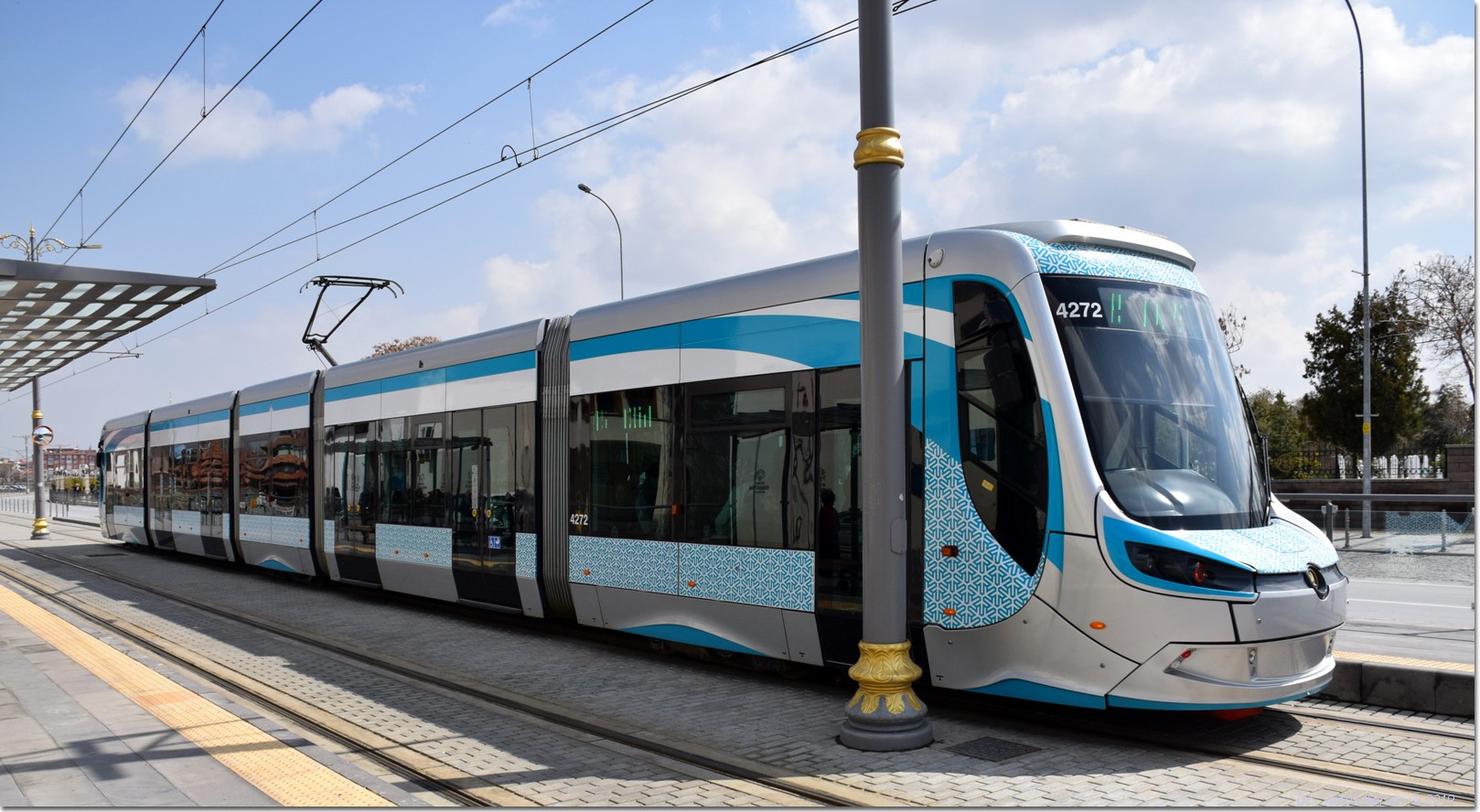
A new model Konya Tram (Line two)
