= High-speed rail in the Czech Republic =

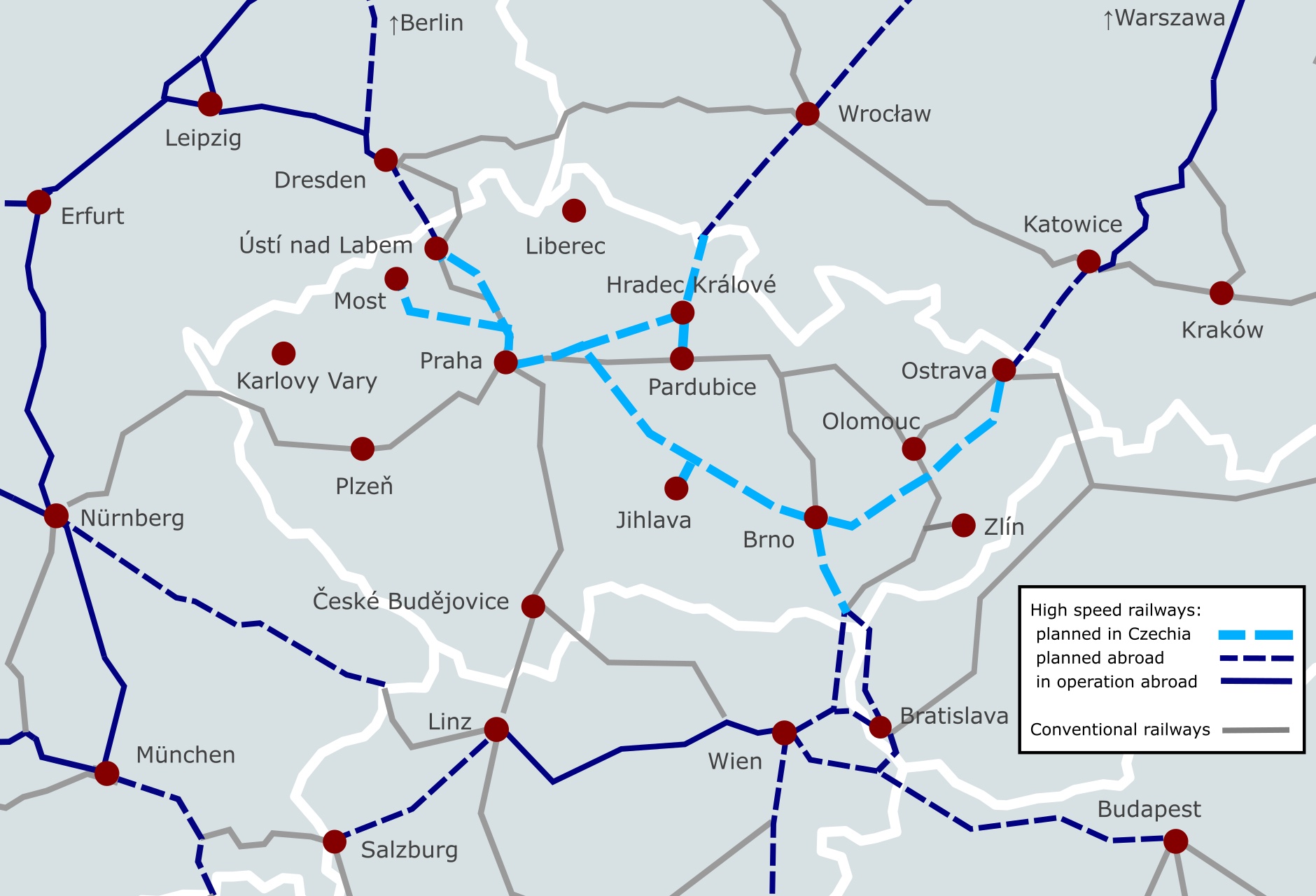
Map of planned high-speed railroad in the Czech Republic and neighboring countries.

High-speed rail in the Czech Republic is being planned with maximum speed between 200 and 320 km/h. In 2026, the Czech government revised its high-speed rail strategy, scheduling construction for the first 200+ km/h segments to begin in 2029 on the Přerov–Ostrava corridor toward Poland. The 2040 completion target encompasses the primary domestic network: the western axis from German: Dresden to Prague via the Krušnohorský tunnel (but excluding the Středohorský tunnel), the central Prague–Brno–Ostrava spine connecting the three biggest Czech cities, and approximately one-third of the international link from Brno to Bratislava and Vienna (terminating near Rakvice). The branches from Prague to Most and from Prague to Hradec Králové and Polish Wroclaw were put aside.

Although České Dráhy owns and operates multiple rolling stock capable of speeds of 230 km/h (143 mph) since 2004, there is, as of 2026, no rail tracks capable of velocity over 200 km/h (124 mph). The only exception is the 13.3-kilometre long track at Velim railway test circuit with a maximum allowed speed of 230 km/h (143 mph) for tilting trains and up to 210 km/h (130 mph) for conventional trains. Czech rolling stock manufacturer Škoda Transportation has produced high-speed rolling stock since the 1970s.

== Infrastructure ==
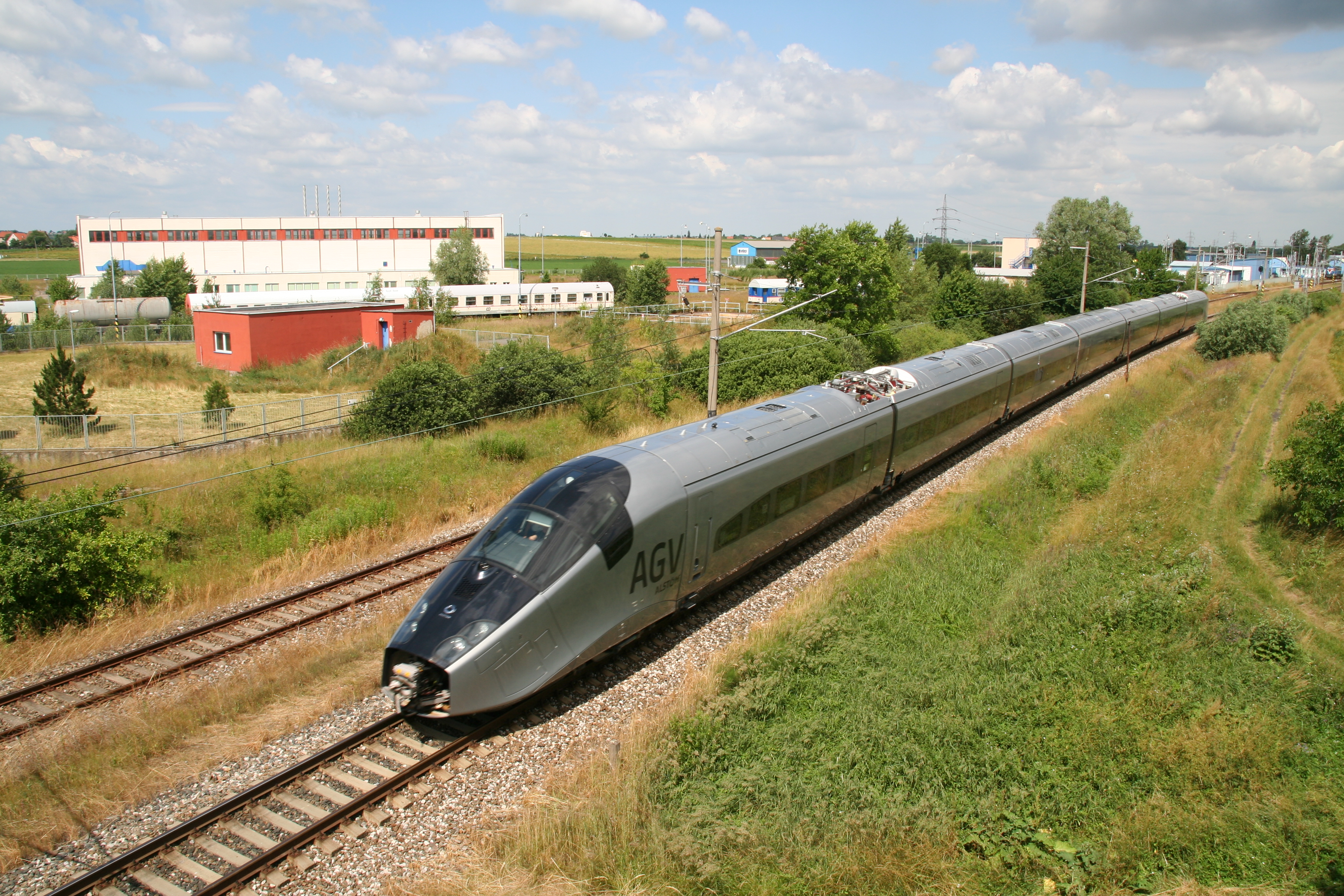
Alstom AGV train on the large Velim circuit

The basis for Czech high-speed rail was laid down in 2017 when the Government approved the High-Speed Rail Development Program. According to this program, the following routes, referred to as "RS", (standing for rychlá spojení, fast connections) will be developed:

- RS1: Prague – Brno – Ostrava – (Katowice)
- RS2: Brno – Břeclav – (Vienna / Bratislava)
- RS3: Prague – Plzeň – (Nuremberg / Munich)
- RS4: Prague – Ústí nad Labem – (Dresden)
- RS5: Prague – Hradec Králové – (Wrocław)

The development will include the construction of new lines as well as upgrade existing lines to 200 km/h (124 mph). New high-speed routes will consist of the following shorter sections:

label	section	route	length	maximum speed	service	start of construction	expected completion
VRT-01	VRT Polabí	RS1, RS5	29 km	320 km/h	passengers	2027	2032
VRT-02	VRT Střední Čechy	RS1	70 km	320 km/h	passengers	2028	2032
	VRT Vysočina II. fáze	RS1	79 km	320 km/h	passengers	2029	2034
VRT-04	VRT Vysočina I. fáze	RS1	33 km	320 km/h	passengers	2028	2032
	VRT Haná	RS1	N/A	320 km/h	passengers	after 2040	after 2045
VRT-05	VRT Jižní Morava	RS2	34 km	320 km/h	passengers	2027	2030
VRT-06	VRT Moravská brána I	RS1	20 km	320 km/h	passengers	2027	2030
VRT-07	VRT Moravská brána II	RS1	45 km	320 km/h	passengers	2026	2032
VRT-08	VRT Podřipsko	RS4	58 km	320 km/h	passengers	2027	2030
	VRT Středohorský tunel	RS4	21.5 km	250 km/h	passengers, freight	2038	2045
VRT-09	VRT Krušnohorský tunel	RS4	23 km	200 km/h	passengers, freight	2028	2038
	VRT Poohří	RS4	65 km	250 km/h	passengers, freight	after 2030	2035
	VRT Východní Čechy	RS5	60 km	250–320 km/h	passengers	after 2040	after 2040
	VRT Podkrkonoší	RS5	50–60 km	250–320 km/h	N/A	after 2040	after 2040

=== Pilot projects ===
In 2018 SŽDC identified following three shorter sections as pilot projects:

- VRT Polabí (HST Polabí) – Prague – Poříčany (30 km) – part of future RS1 and RS5
- VRT Jižní Morava (HST South Moravia) – Brno – Vranovice – part of future RS2
- VRT Moravská brána (HST Moravian Gate) – Přerov – Ostrava – part of future RS1

=== Train stations planning ===
Along the high-speed route RS1 (Prague-Brno-Ostrava), several new train stations are planned. Just south to the D11 motorway in the town of Nehvizdy in the Prague-East District, the new Prague East Terminal (Terminál Praha východ) is being planned. This station will be a transport hub as a part of the RS1 and RS5 (Prague-Liberec/Hradec Králové) routes and will mainly serve residents of the northeastern part of the Central Bohemian Region. Along RS1, the high-speed line will be connected via a branch line to the train station of Světlá nad Sázavou, which will be reconstructed.

Close to highway exit 112 on the D1 motorway in the Jihlava District, a new Jihlava train station (terminál Jihlava VRT) is planned as part of RS1. This station will also be connected to the regional railway between Jihlava and Havlíčkův Brod and serve as a transport hub for the Vysočina Region. Another new station to the west of Velká Bíteš is planned on a branch line from the RS1 towards the regional railway between Havlíčkův Brod and Brno.

In the south of Brno, the new train station Brno-Vídeňská is planned to serve the region around Brno and to prevent unnecessary traffic to Brno main railway station in the city centre.

One new train station is planned along the high-speed route RS4 (Prague – Ústí nad Labem). This new train station (Terminál Roudnice nad Labem VRT) will be constructed to the west of Roudnice nad Labem and will serve as a transfer hub in the Litoměřice District.

SŽ is also considering upgrading of some ETCS-equipped 160 km/h (99 mph) tracks to 200 km/h (124 mph) and also upgrading some current 160 km/h (99 mph) projects to 200 km/h (124 mph). In 2020 SŽ called for bids to upgrade ongoing 9 km (6 mi) Soběslav – Doubí project and 20 km (12 mi) Sudoměřice – Votice project to 200 km/h (124 mph), both projects are on Prague – České Budějovice route.

== Rolling stock operated in the Czech Republic ==
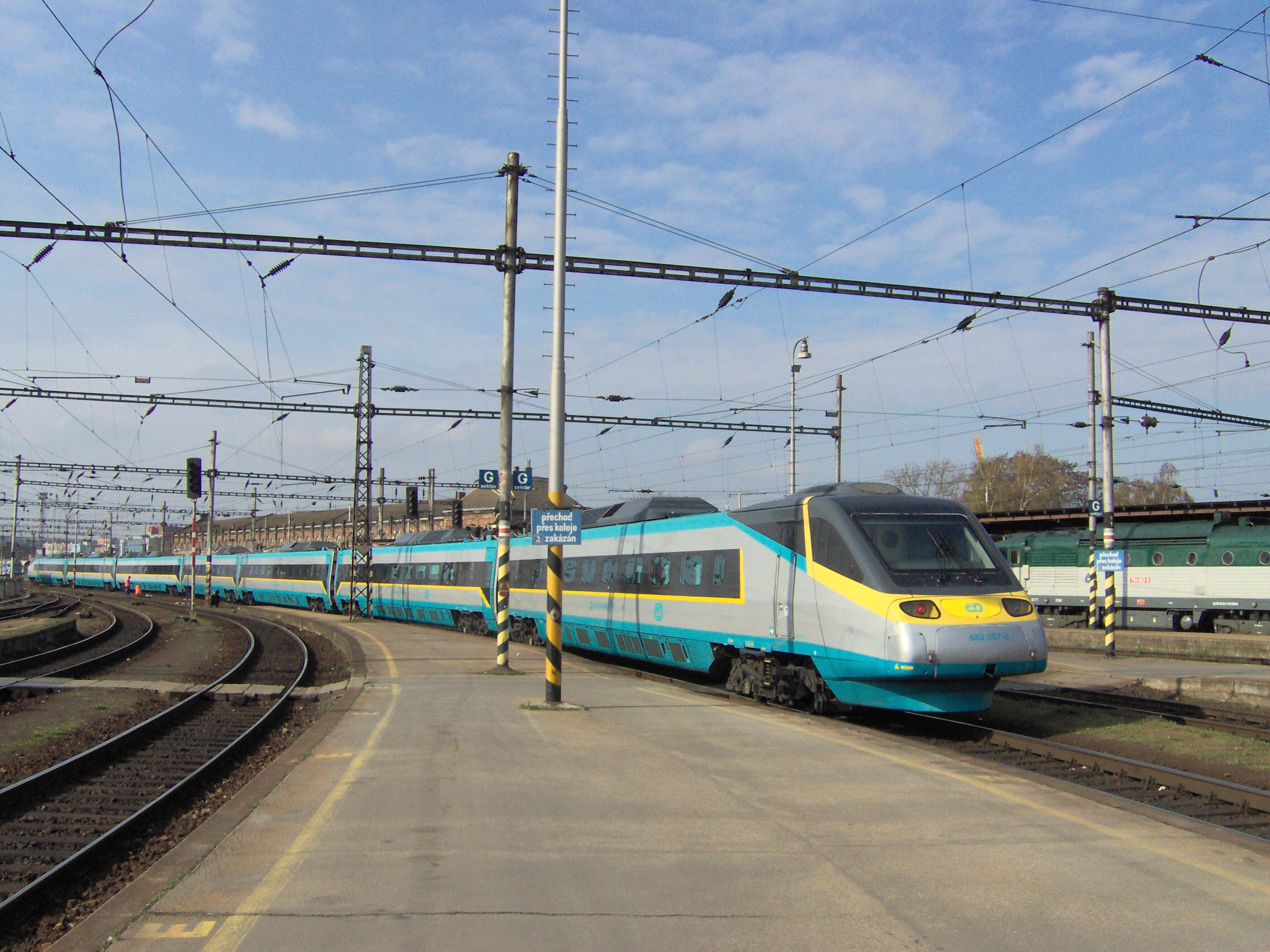
ČD Class 680 trainset in Brno

Since 2004 České dráhy have been operating seven ČD Class 680 sets. These Pendolino-based trains are capable of operating at 230 km/h (143 mph) and were intended for operation on the Berlin – Prague – Vienna route. While testing from Břeclav to Brno on 18 November 2004, the ČD Class 680 reached a speed of 237 km/h (147 mph) and created a new Czech railway speed record. In reality ČD Class 680 were never operated in Germany and appeared only in Austria and Slovakia; since 2012 they have only operated on domestic routes and in Slovakia.

From 2010 České dráhy are receiving delivery of 20 new ČD Class 380 locomotives capable of a speed of 200 km/h (124 mph), they operate also tens of passenger cars capable of that speed (classes 10–91, 21–91, 72–91 and 88–91). In 2013 České dráhy also ordered 7 Railjet trains capable of a speed of 230 km/h (143 mph).

== Rolling stock manufactured in the Czech Republic ==
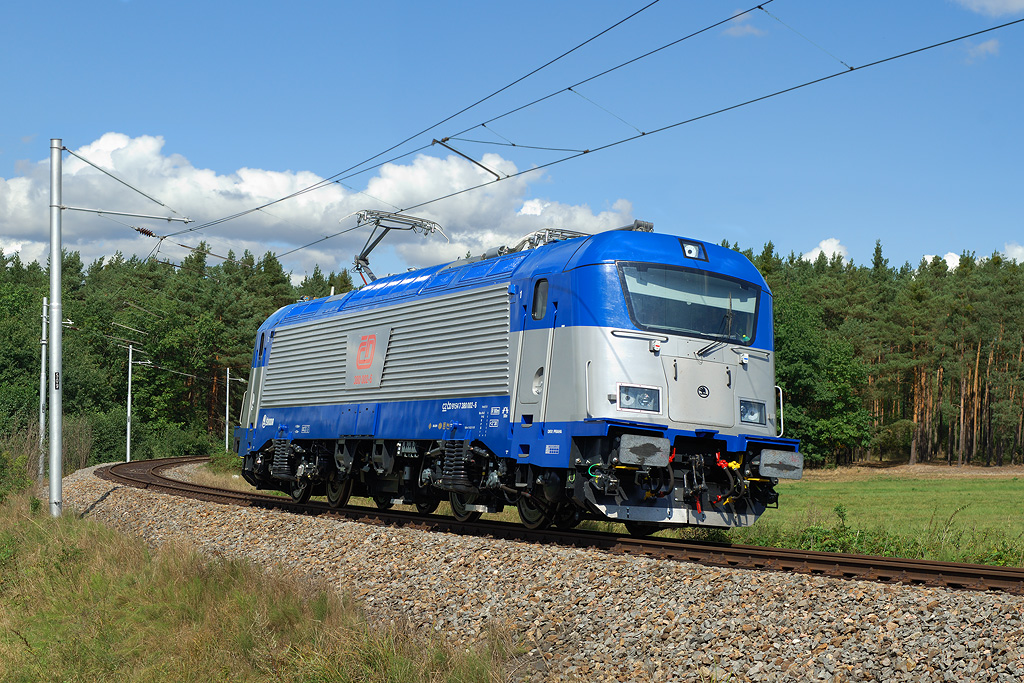
ČD Class 380 locomotive on the Velim circuit

In 1974 and 1979 Škoda produced 12 Škoda 66Е locomotives capable of a speed of 200 km/h (124 mph) for the Soviet Union. These were designated as Chs200 (ЧС200) and were used mainly on the Nevsky Express train on the Moscow – Saint Petersburg Railway. The locomotives were refurbished in the 1990s and during testing in 2007 one locomotive reached a speed of 262 km/h (163 mph).

Since 2008 Škoda has been producing Skoda 109E locomotives capable of a speed over 200 km/h (124 mph). The ČD Class 380 batch is certified for 220 km/h (137 mph), however the Slovak ZSSK Class 381 batch only for a speed of 160 km/h (99 mph).

== Future rolling stock ==
České dráhy aimed to make their fleet ready for speeds over 200 km/h by issuing a tender of procuring new rolling stock. In 2021 the consortium of Siemens Mobility and Škoda Transportation has won the tender for 20 Viaggio Comfort non-traction units with eight passenger cars and a passenger control car, enabling push-pull operation. With designed operating speed of 230 km/h (143 mph), the delivery is expected to start from 2024 to 2026 and the order is valued at around half a billion EUR.

The cars will be approved for operation in the Czech Republic and neighbouring European countries such as Germany, Austria, Slovakia, Hungary, and Poland. The non-traction units will be used with Siemens Vectron MS locomotives ordered separately in 2022, with deliveries starting in 2025 and an initial amount of 50 locomotives with designated speed of 230 km/h (143 mph).
