= ZSSK Class 757 =

Slovak diesel locomotive, rebuilt 2010–2015

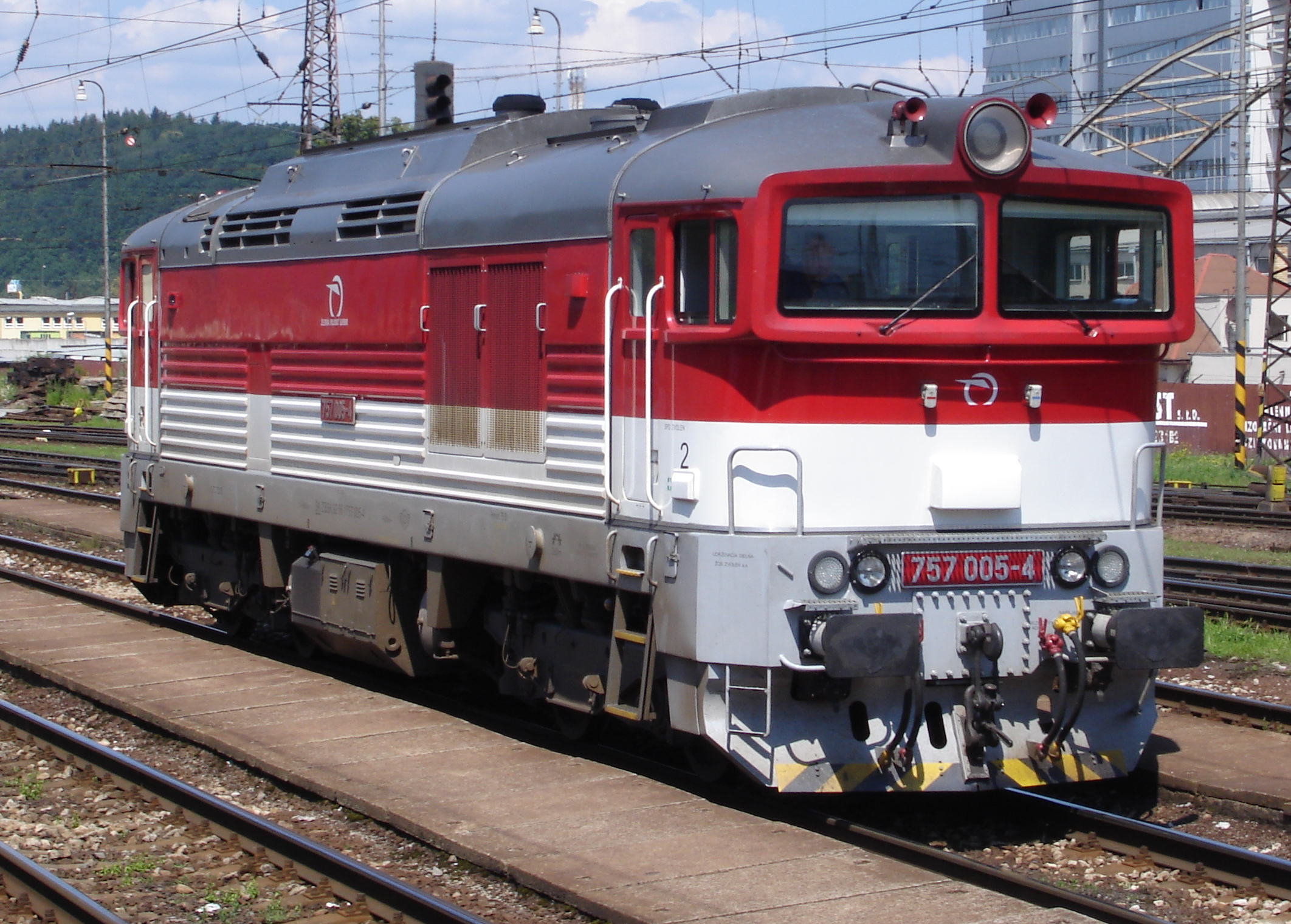
Type and origin
- Power type: Diesel-electric
- Builder: ČKD Praha
- Rebuilder: ŽOS Zvolen
- Rebuild date: 2010 to 2015
- Number rebuilt: 25
Specifications
- Configuration
  - AAR: B-B
  - UIC: Bo'Bo'
  - Commonwealth: Bo-Bo
- Gauge: 1,435 mm (4 ft 8 1/2 in)
- Length
  - Over beams: 16,540 millimetres (651 in)
- Loco weight: 75,400 kilograms (166,200 lb)
- Fuel type: Diesel
- Prime mover: Caterpillar 3512C HD
Performance figures
- Maximum speed: 100 kilometres per hour (62 mph)
Career
- Operators: ZSSK
- Nicknames: Brejlovec

The ZSSK Class 757 is a four axle diesel electric locomotive, created from the rebuilding of older class 750 locomotives. The locomotives were ordered by Železničná spoločnosť Slovensko for use on passenger services on Slovak main lines. Between 2010 and 2015, 25 locomotives were rebuilt by ŽOS Zvolen.

== Rebuilding ==
Following to České dráhy rebuilding their 750 and 753 locomotives into the 750.7, it was decided to carry out similar rebuilds in Slovakia. The project was started in 2010, when contracts were awarded and the first locomotive began reconstruction. However, unlike the Czech locomotives, the ZSSK rebuilds were more gradual, with the locomotives still required for normal services. The first locomotive was finished in 2011, and following testing it was put into service at Zvolen. The second was completed by the end of the year. From then until 2015 rebuilds progressed at a rate of around 5 to 6 per year. The final rebuilt was locomotive 25, finished in Autumn 2015. New locomotives were allocated to Košice, Prievidza and Humenné.
