= List of Škoda Transportation products =

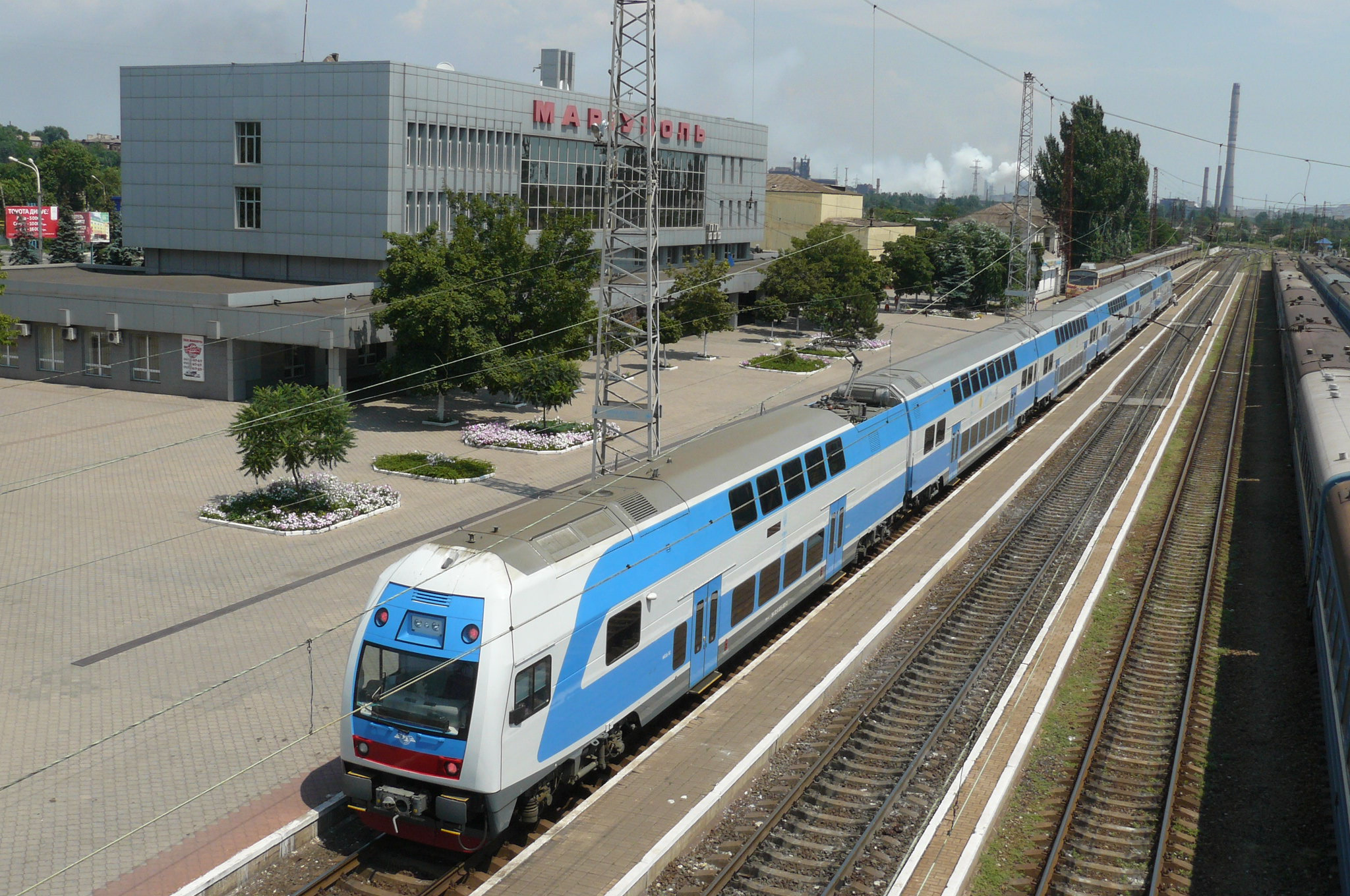
UZ Class 675 produced by Škoda

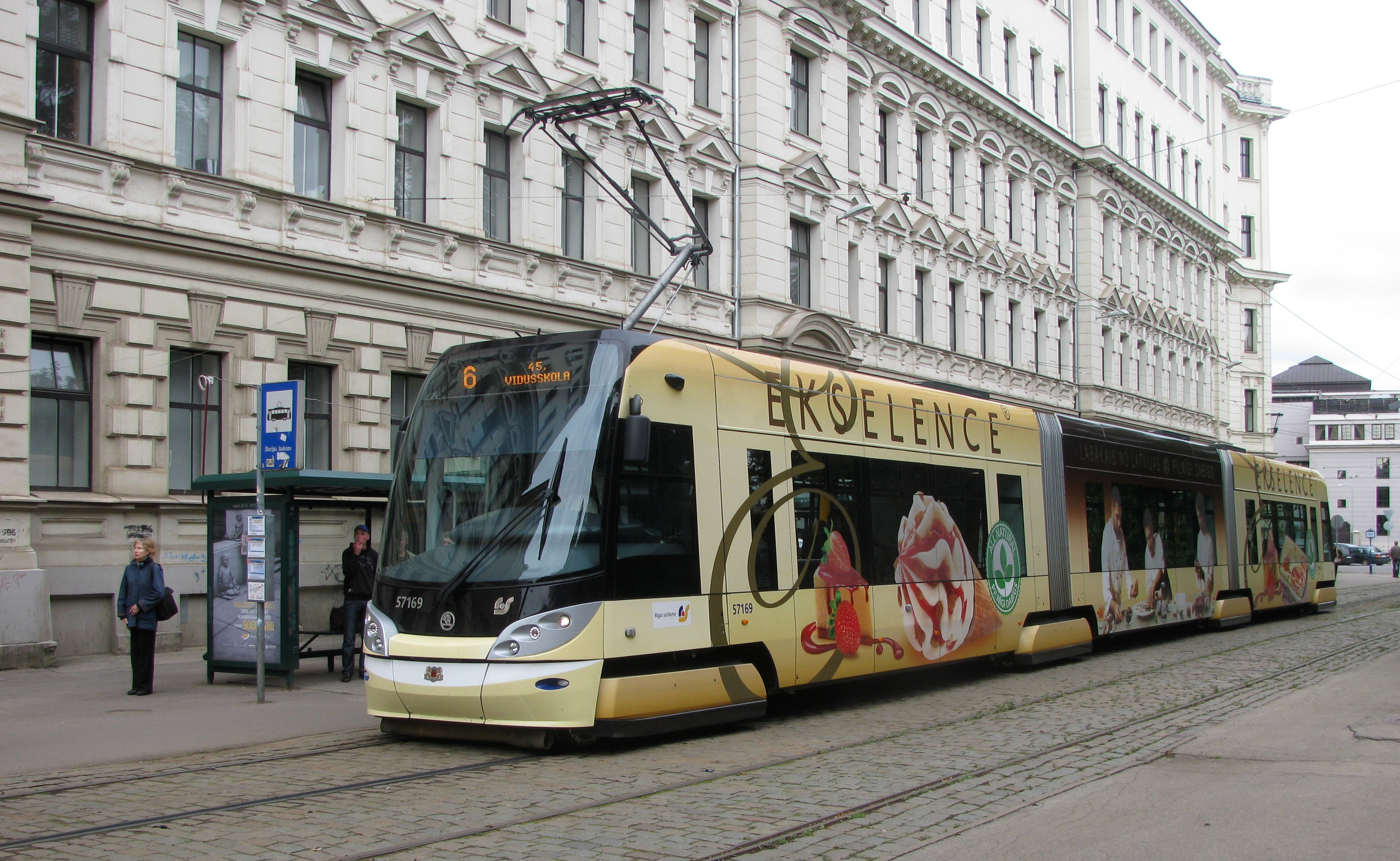
Škoda 15T in Riga

Škoda Transportation produces trolleybuses, tramcars, electric locomotives, electric multiple units and rapid transit trains.

== Rail products ==
=== Electric locomotives ===
Škoda 109 E
Picture	Operator	Variants	Number built	Note
	České dráhy	ČD Class 380	20	
	ZSSK	ZSSK Class 381	2	
	DB Regio	DB Class 102	6	

=== Electric multiple units ===
CityElefant
Picture	Operator	Variants	Number built	Note
	České dráhy	ČD Class 471	83	
	Lithuanian Railways	LG Class 575	13	Overhaul including carbody widening work in 2021–2024.
	ZSSK	ZSSK Class 671	19	
	Ukrainian Railways	UZ Class 675	2	Overhaul including carbody widening work in 2021–2022.

Škoda 7Ev
Picture	Operator	Variants	Number built	Note
	České dráhy	ČD Class 690	19 ordered	
	České dráhy	ČD Class 640	30 + 50 ordered	
	České dráhy	ČD Class 650	38 + 20 ordered	
	České dráhy	ČD Class 660	14	
	Arriva	Class 650	9	Formerly owned by České dráhy
	Regiojet	Class 640	8 ordered	
	Regiojet	Class 650	15 ordered	
	ZSSK	ZSSK Class 660	21 + 5 ordered	
	ZSSK	ZSSK Class 661	13	
	Pasažieru vilciens	PV Class 16EV	30 + 2 ordered	Wide carbody
	South Moravian Region	JMK Class 550	6	
	South Moravian Region	JMK Class 530	31	
	Elron	Elron Class 857	6 + 10 ordered	Wide carbody
	Uzbek Railways		30 ordered	Wide carbody
	Bulgarian Railways		20 ordered	

=== Push–pull trains ===
Double deck unit
Picture	Operator	Variants	Number built	Note
	ZSSK	ZSSK Class 951	10	
	DB Regio		6	
	České dráhy		5	

=== Railcars ===
Regionova
Picture	Operator	Variants	Number built	Note
	České dráhy	ČD Class 812	1	
	České dráhy	ČD Class 814	237	
	Arriva Morava	ČD Class 814	1	

Dm12
Picture	Operator	Variants	Number built	Note
	VR Group	VR Class Dm12	16	

=== Tramcars ===
Škoda Astra
Picture	Variants	Operated in	Number built	Note
	Škoda 03 T	Brno	17	
	Škoda 03 T	Most–Litvínov	2	
	Škoda 03 T	Olomouc	4	
	Škoda 03 T	Ostrava	14	
	Škoda 03 T	Plzeň	11	

Škoda Vektra
Picture	Variants	Operated in	Number built	Note
	Škoda 05 T	Plzeň (never in regular service)	1	

Škoda Elektra
Picture	Variants	Operated in	Number built	Note
	Škoda 06 T	Cagliari	9	
	Škoda 10 T	Portland, Oregon	7	
	Škoda 10 T	Tacoma, Washington	3	
	Škoda 13 T	Brno	49	
	Škoda 14 T	Prague	60	
	Škoda 16 T	Wrocław	17	Refurbished 2020–2022 by Saatz
	Škoda 19 T	Wrocław	31	

Škoda ForCity Classic
Picture	Variants	Operated in	Number built	Note
	Škoda 26 T	Miskolc	31	
	Škoda 28 T	Konya	72	
	Škoda 35 T	Chemnitz	14	
	Škoda 18 T	Eskişehir	14	
		Bergamo	10 ordered	

Škoda ForCity Plus
Picture	Variants	Operated in	Number built	Note
	Škoda 29 T	Bratislava	50	
	Škoda 30 T	Bratislava	40	
	Škoda 48 T	Brandenburg an der Havel	4 ordered	
	Škoda 47 T	Cottbus	1 + 6 ordered	
	Škoda 46 T	Frankfurt (Oder)	2 + 11 ordered	
	Škoda 52 T	Prague	40 ordered	

Škoda ForCity Alfa
Picture	Variants	Operated in	Number built	Note
	Škoda 15 T	Prague	251	
	Škoda 15 T	Riga	46	

Škoda ForCity Smart
Picture	Variants	Operated in	Number built	Note
	Škoda Artic	Schöneiche	1	
	Škoda Artic	Helsinki	70	
	Škoda Artic	Jokeri light rail (Helsinki & Espoo)	25 + 4 ordered	
	Škoda Artic	Tampere	20	
	Škoda 36T, 37T, 38T	RNV	32 + 48 ordered	
	Škoda 39T	Ostrava	38	
	Škoda 40T	Plzeň	12 + 10 ordered	
	Škoda 41T	Bonn	2 + 24 ordered	
	Škoda 45T	Brno	5 + 35 ordered	
		Kassel	22 ordered	

=== Metro cars ===
81-71M
Picture	Operated in	Number built	Note
	Prague, Czech Republic	93	Škoda 2Mt / 3Mt / 4Mt

NeVa
Picture	Operated in	Number built	Note
	Saint Petersburg, Russia	24	Škoda 18Mt / 19Mt / 20Mt (Russian: 81-556/81-557/81-558)

Škoda Varsovia
Picture	Operated in	Number built	Note
	Warsaw, Poland	37	Metro train for Warsaw Metro. Contract signed 2020, delivery from 2022, includes option for 8 additional trains. / Škoda 21Mt / 22Mt / 23Mt

Sofia
Picture	Operated in	Number built	Note
	Sofia, Bulgaria	8	Metro train for Sofia Metro. Contract signed 2023, delivery from 2026.

== Trolleybuses ==
Škoda 24Tr Irisbus
Picture	Variants	Operated in	Note
	24Tr; 24TrBT	Jihlava, Czech Republic; Mariánské Lázně, Czech Republic; Pardubice, Czech Republic; Plzeň, Czech Republic; Teplice, Czech Republic; Zlín – Otrokovice, Czech Republic; Riga, Latvia; Timișoara, Romania; Prešov, Slovakia; Urgench, Uzbekistan	
Škoda 25Tr Irisbus
Picture	Variants	Operated in	Note
	25Tr; 25TrBT	Brno, Czech Republic; České Budějovice, Czech Republic; Chomutov – Jirkov, Czech Republic; Plzeň, Czech Republic; Teplice, Czech Republic; Ústí nad Labem, Czech Republic; Zlín – Otrokovice, Czech Republic; Bratislava, Slovakia; Prešov, Slovakia	
Škoda 26Tr Solaris
Picture	Variants	Operated in	Note
	26Tr	Jihlava, Czech Republic; Opava, Czech Republic; Ostrava, Czech Republic; Pardubice, Czech Republic; Plzeň, Czech Republic; Teplice, Czech Republic; Zlín – Otrokovice, Czech Republic; Sofia, Bulgaria; Pleven, Bulgaria; Varna, Bulgaria; Burgas, Bulgaria; Stara Zagora, Bulgaria; Galați, Romania	
Škoda 27Tr Solaris
Picture	Variants	Operated in	Note
	27Tr	Ostrava, Czech Republic; Plzeň, Czech Republic; Zlín – Otrokovice, Czech Republic; Sofia, Bulgaria	
Škoda 28Tr Solaris
Picture	Variants	Operated in	Note
	28Tr	Pardubice, Czech Republic; Teplice, Czech Republic; Ústí nad Labem, Czech Republic	
Škoda 30Tr SOR
Picture	Variants	Operated in	Note
	30Tr	Hradec Králové, Czech Republic; Banská Bystrica, Slovakia; Žilina, Slovakia; Bratislava, Slovakia	
Škoda 31Tr SOR
Picture	Variants	Operated in	Note
	31Tr	Hradec Králové, Czech Republic; Prešov, Slovakia; Žilina, Slovakia; Bratislava, Slovakia	
Škoda 32Tr SOR
Picture	Variants	Operated in	Note
	32Tr	Brno, Czech Republic; Jihlava, Cezch Republic; Opava, Czech Republic; Pardubice, Czech Republic; Teplice, Czech Republic; Vilnius, Lithuania Tallinn, Estonia	
Škoda 33Tr SOR
Picture	Variants	Operated in	Note
	33Tr	Teplice, Czech Republic; České Budějovice, Czech Republic Tallinn, Estonia	
Škoda 35Tr IVECO
Picture	Variants	Operated in	Note
	35Tr	Zlín, Czech Republic; Otrokovice, Czech Republic; Limoges, France	

== See also ==
- Category:Škoda locomotives
- Category:Škoda trams
