= Regional-Express =

Passenger rail service in Germany, distinct from Intercity services

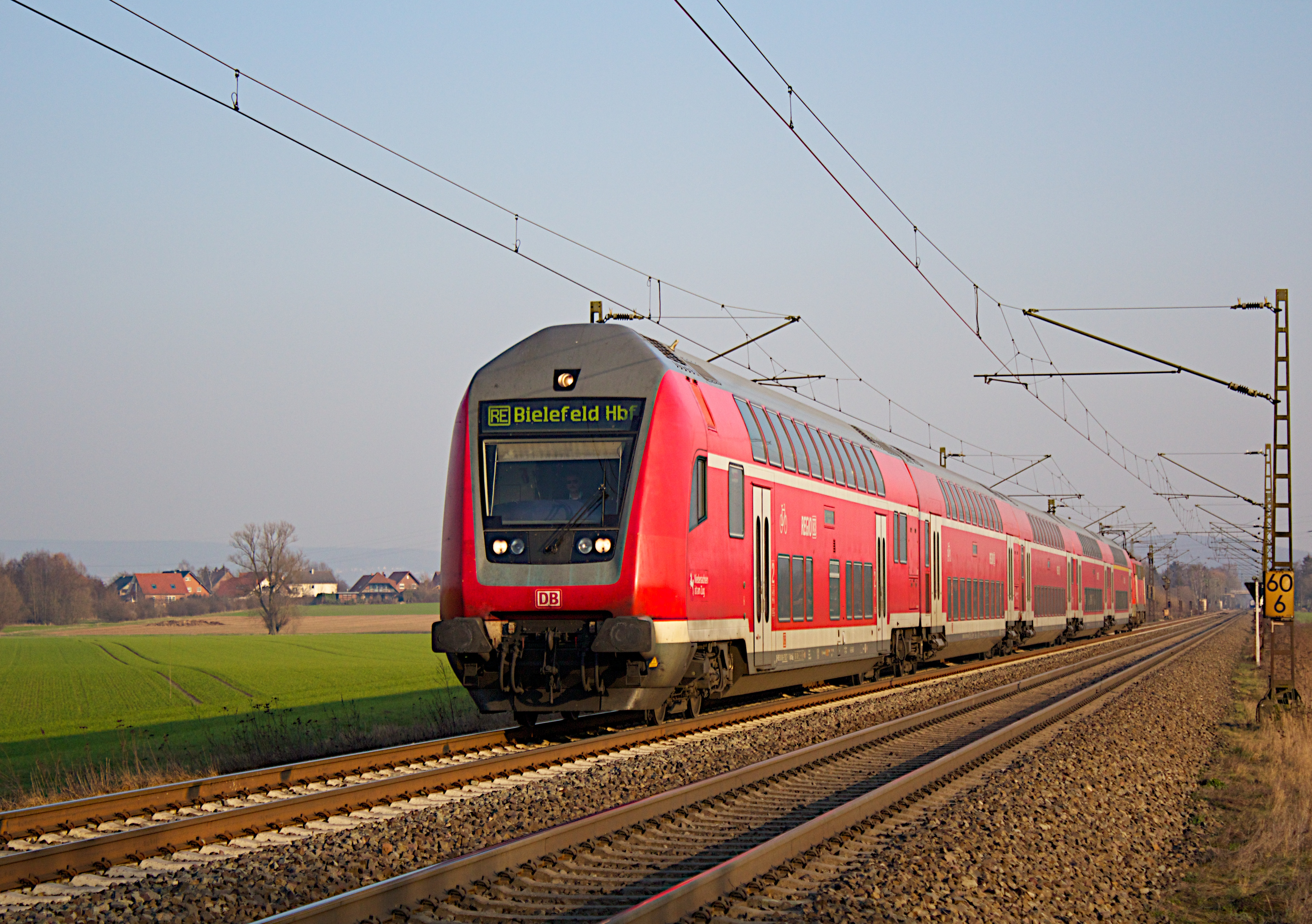
German Regional-Express train operated by Deutsche Bahn near Minden

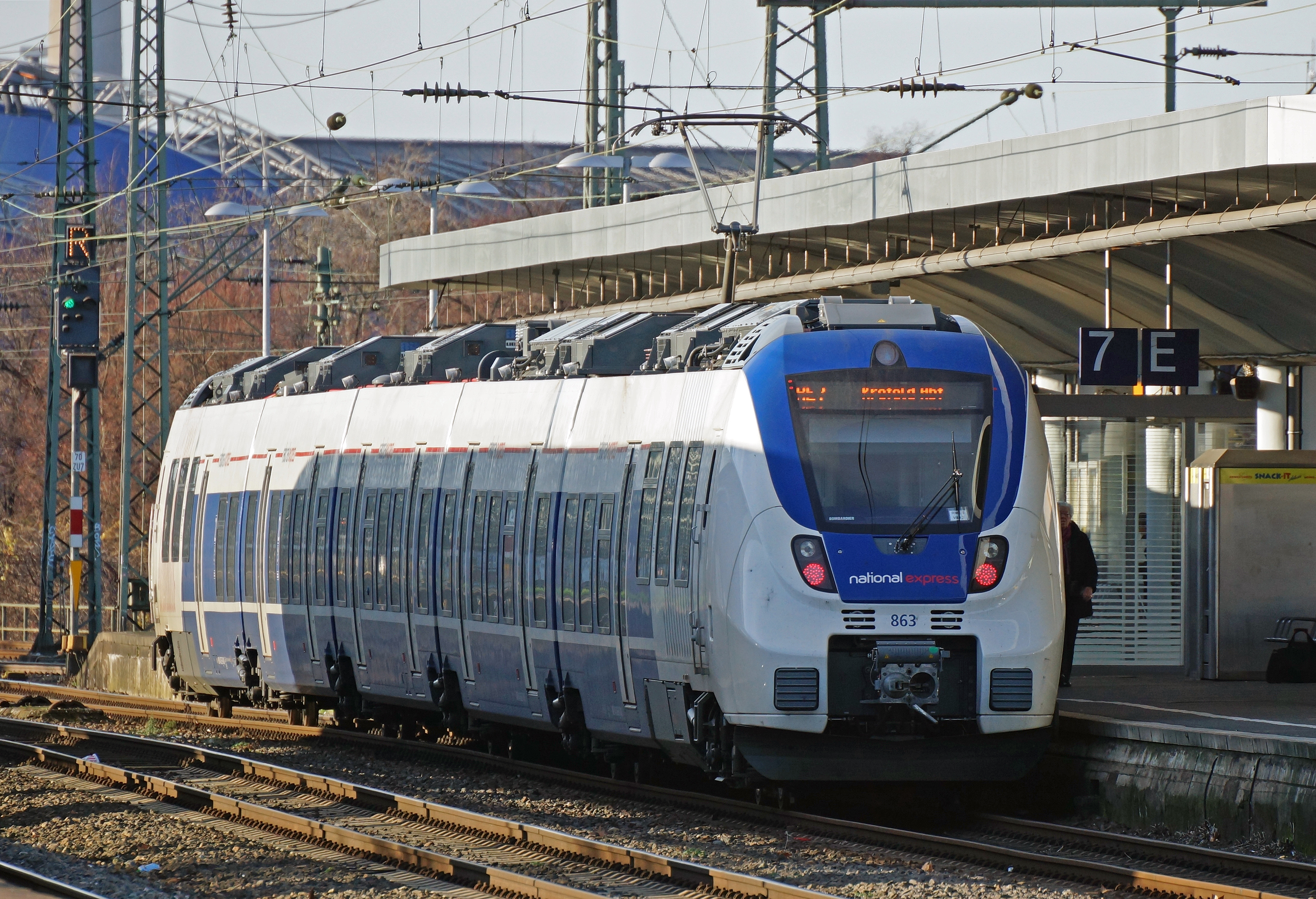
German Regional-Express operated by National Express in Cologne

In Germany, Luxembourg, Austria and Slovakia, the Regional-Express (pronounced [ʁeɡi̯oˈnaːlʔɛksˌpʁɛs]; RE, or in Austria and Slovakia: REX) is a type of regional train. It is similar to a semi-fast train, with a top speed of 160 km/h (100 mph) and an average speed of about 70–90 km/h (45–55 mph) as it calls at fewer stations than Regionalbahn (in Austria: Regionalzug) or S-Bahn trains, but stops more often than Intercity or Intercity Express services.

== Operations ==
The first Regional-Express services were operated by DB Regio, though since the liberalisation of the German rail market (Bahnreform) in the 1990s many operators have received franchise rights on lines from the federal states. Some private operators currently operate trains that are similar to a Regional-Express service, but have decided to use their own names for the sake of brand awareness instead.

Regional-Express services are carried out with a variety of vehicles such as DMUs (of Class 612), EMUs (of Class 425 or 426) or, most commonly, electric or diesel locomotives with double-deck cars, the latter often with new Class 146 engines. Many RE services run in hourly intervals, carrying line numbers and sometimes even names, varying from state to state.

Since late 2006, Regional-Express services between Munich and Nuremberg that operate on the Nuremberg–Munich high-speed railway reach top speeds of 200 km/h (125 mph). These services are operated with repainted InterCity cars and Class 101 locomotives or Class 102 and double-deck cars.

== Sweden ==
In Sweden, several regional trains reach 180 or 200 km/h (110 or 125 mph). They are usually called just regional trains, or named after their respective regional transit administration. Two large regional train networks are Øresundståg and Mälartåg, operating services partially in parallel with local train services like Pågatågen and Storstockholms Lokaltrafik commuter trains.
