= Škoda RegioPanter =

Czech electric multiple train unit

Škoda 7Ev
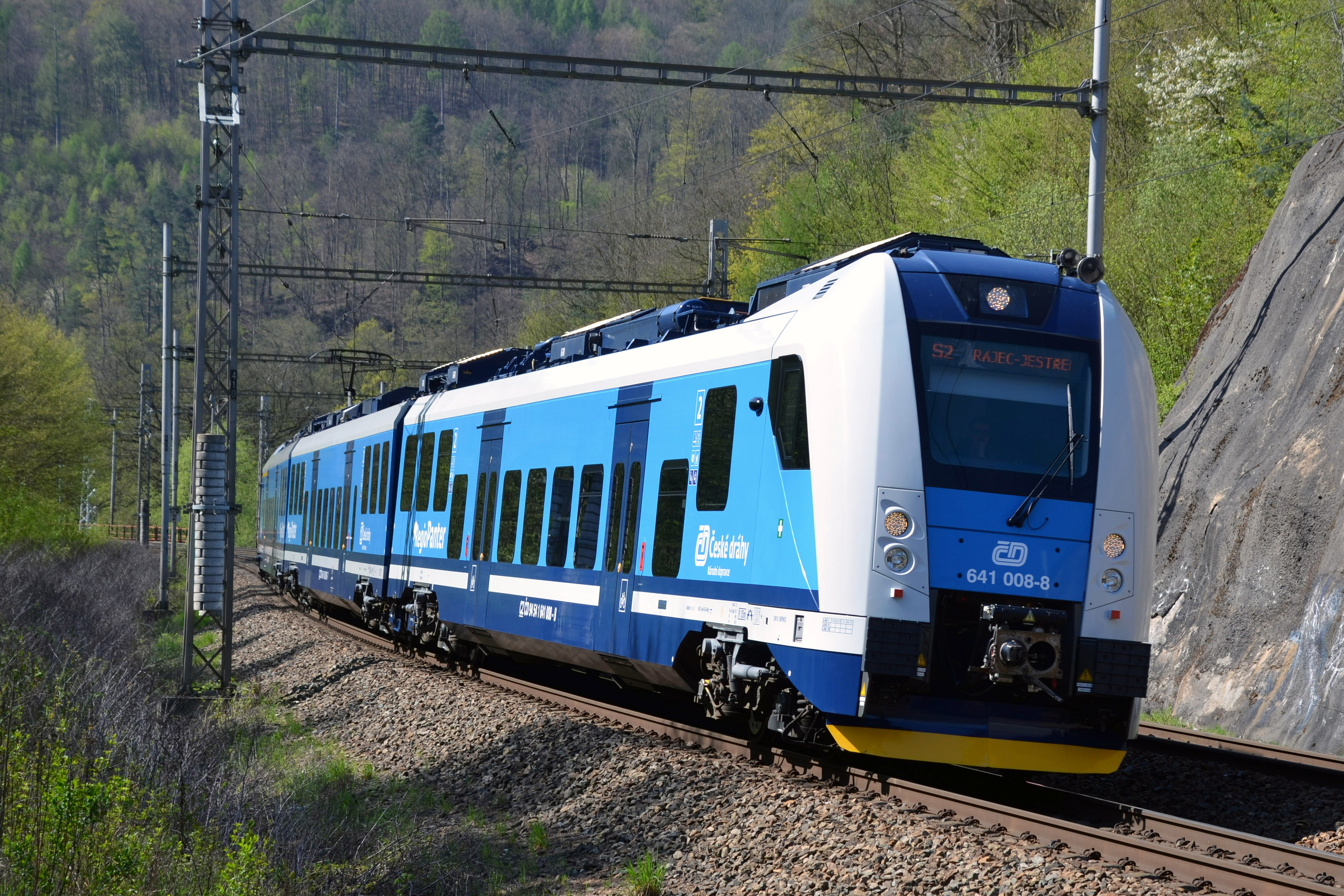
- Škoda 7Ev electric multiple unit train
- Manufacturer: Škoda Transportation
- Constructed: 2011–
- Number under construction: 122
- Number in service: 262
- Formation: 2 to 6-car
- Capacity: 147–400 seats

Specifications
- Train length: 52.9 m (173 ft 7 in) (2-car); 79.4 m (260 ft 6 in) (3-car); 105.9 m (347 ft 5 in) (4-car); 132.4 m (434 ft 5 in) (5-car); 159.2 m (522 ft 4 in) (6-car)
- Width: 2.82 m (9 ft 3 in); 3.4 m (11 ft 2 in)
- Height: 4.26 m (14 ft 0 in)
- Low-floor: 65%
- Platform height: 550 mm (22 in)
- Maximum speed: 160 km/h (100 mph)
- Weight: 106–242 tonnes (234,000–534,000 lb)
- Power output: 1,360–2,720 kW (1,820–3,650 hp)
- Electric systems: 3 kV DC; 25 kV 50 Hz AC
- Current collection: Pantograph
- UIC classification: Bo'2'+2'Bo'; Bo'2'+Bo'2'+2'Bo'; Bo'2'+Bo'2'+2'2'+2'Bo'; Bo'2'+Bo'2'+2'2'+Bo'2'+2'Bo'
- Coupling system: Scharfenberg
- Multiple working: Up to 4 units
- Track gauge: 1,435 mm (4 ft 8 1/2 in) (standard gauge); 1,520 mm (4 ft 11 27/32 in) (Russian gauge)

The Škoda RegioPanter is a family of single-deck electric multiple units (EMUs) manufactured by Škoda Transportation. The family originated with the Škoda 7Ev, developed for České dráhy, with the first units entering passenger service in 2012. Initially developed for regional services in the Czech Republic, the RegioPanter platform has since been adapted for use in several other European countries, including Slovakia, Latvia, Estonia and Bulgaria.

Most RegioPanter variants have a maximum speed of 160 km/h (99 mph) and are available in different formations and electrical configurations. The family also includes the InterPanter for interregional and long-distance services and battery-electric variants capable of operating on non-electrified sections of railway.

== Operators ==
=== České dráhy / Czech Railways ===
==== RegioPanter ====
The České dráhy ordered 3 different variants of trainsets in 2011. The first order consisted of 12 units of class 440 (3-car, 241 seats), 3 units of class 640 (3-car, 241 seats) and 4 units of class 650 (2-car, 147 seats). First five units entered service in September 2012. Then came several more orders. Škoda Transportation produced another 46 units of improved class 650 marked 650.2, 60 units of class 640.2 and also four BEMU class 690.2. In the Czech Republic, the train sets of the Czech Railways carrier are known as RegioPanter. In 2024, another 15 BEMU units of class 690 ordered by České dráhy.

All 440 class units have been upgraded in 2021–2022 to multi-system class 640.1 due to gradual switching to AC traction system. This upgrade were made by Škoda Transportation.

In 2020, one 650 class unit was tested on the Tábor–Bechyně railway. The reason was to verify compatibility with small arc radii due to possible future deployment on this railway.

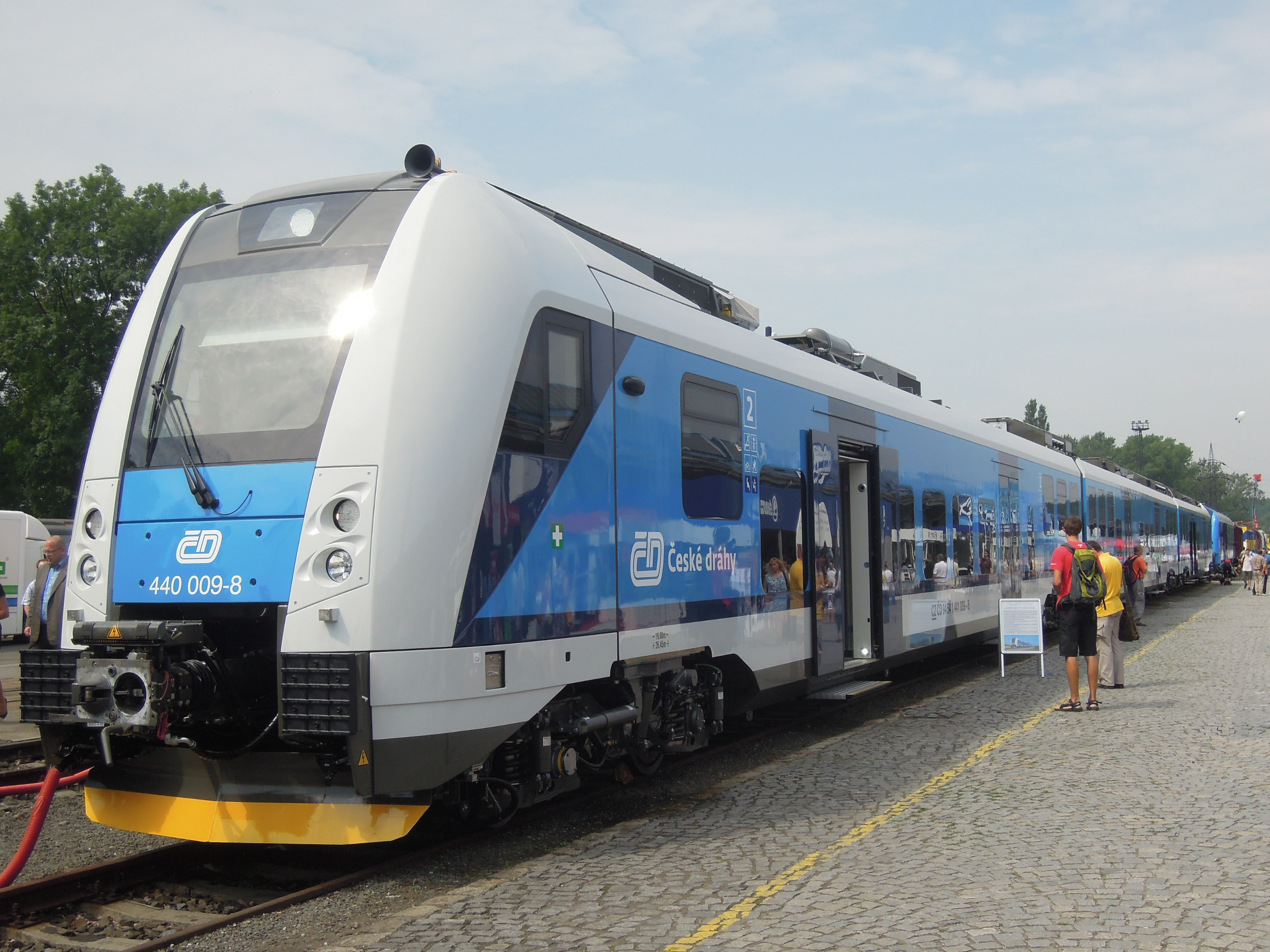
RegioPanter at Czech Raildays 2012

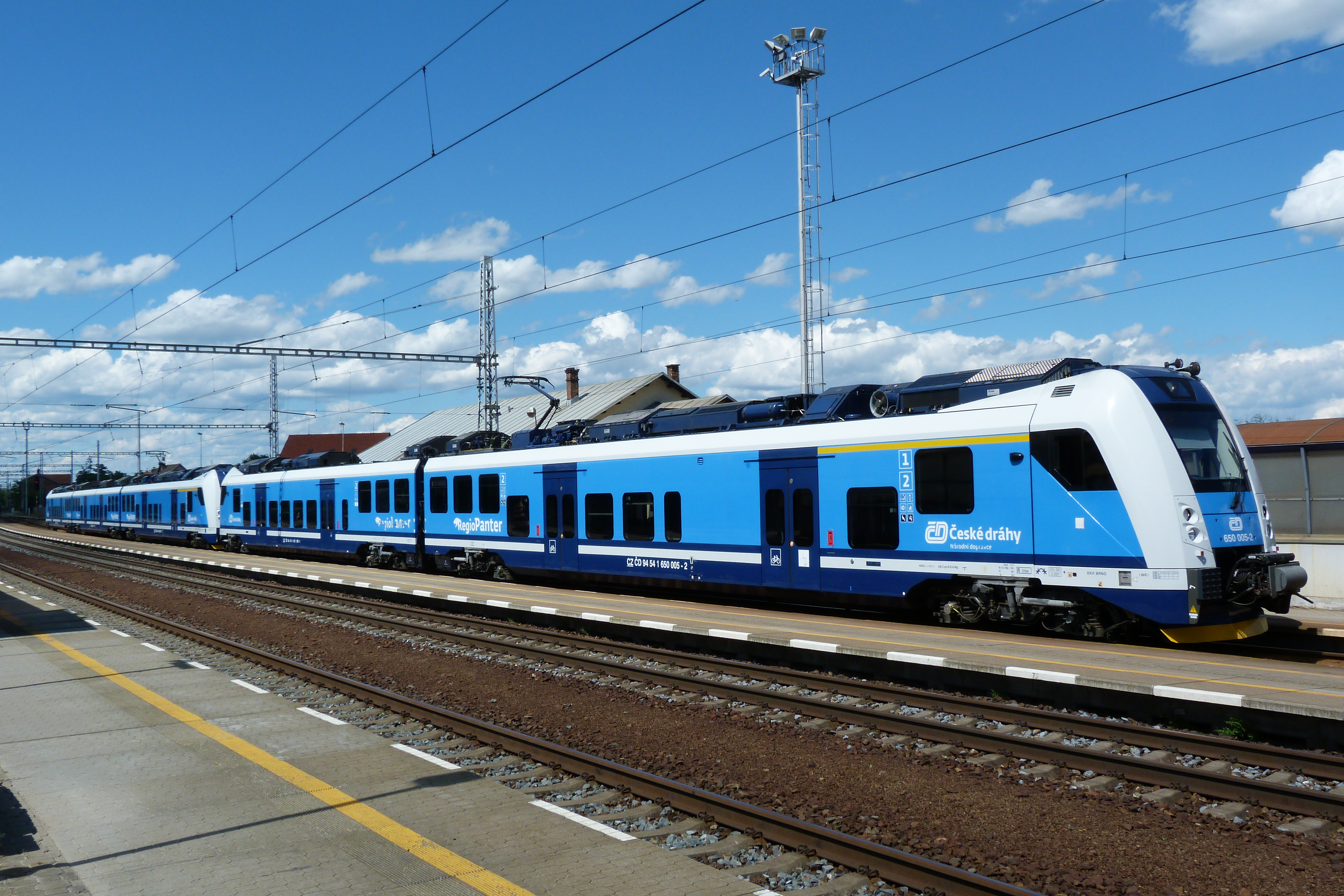
Coupled units class 650 and 640 in Vranovice

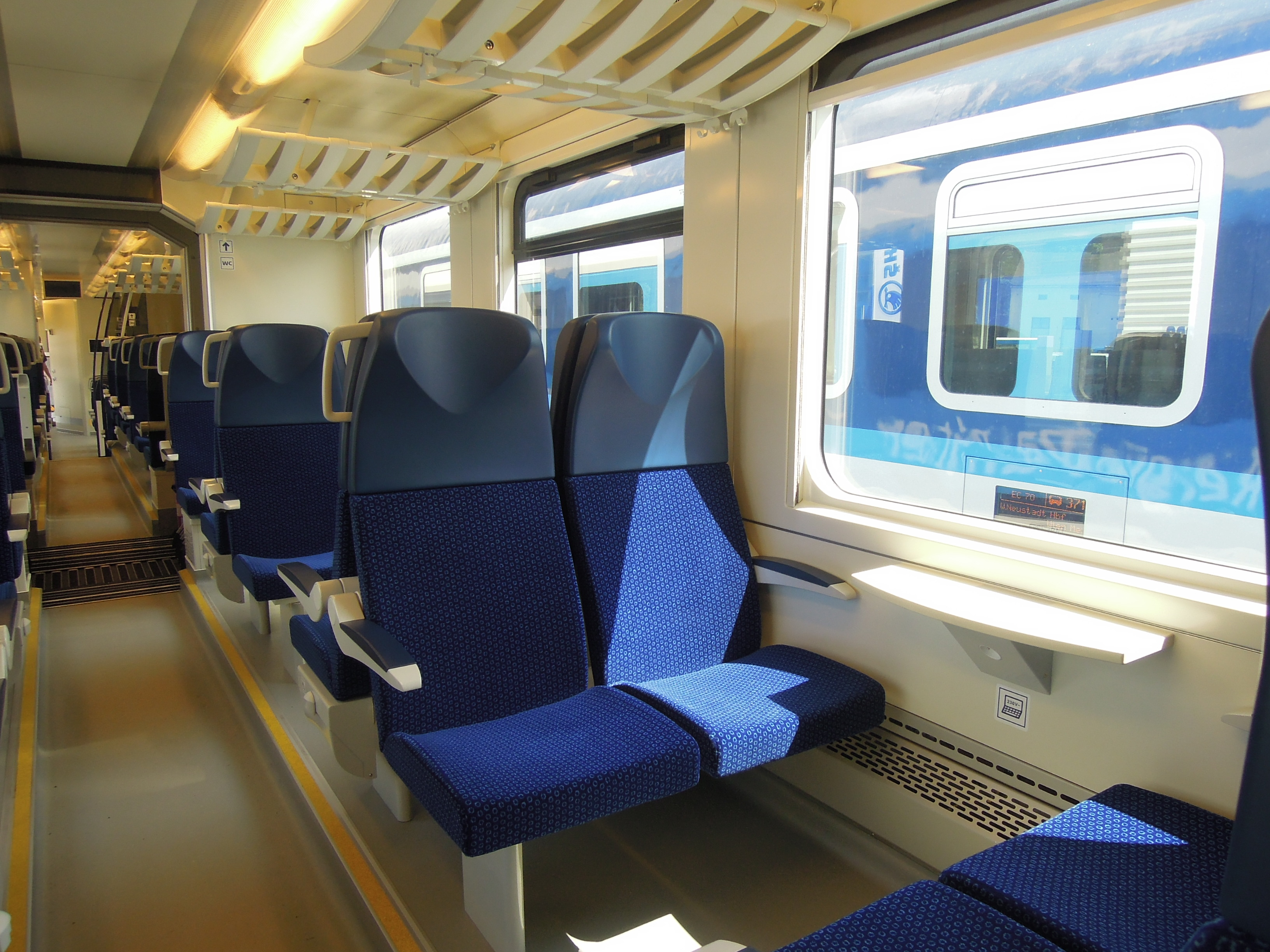
Interior of ČD Class 650

==== InterPanter ====
In 2015–16 were built 14 units Škoda 10Ev for fast train lines, which are use on routes Brno–Prague and Brno–Břeclav–Olomouc. The České dráhy use the brand name InterPanter for these units. InterPanter units have fewer doors, more luggage and bicycle space and a vending machine with snacks.

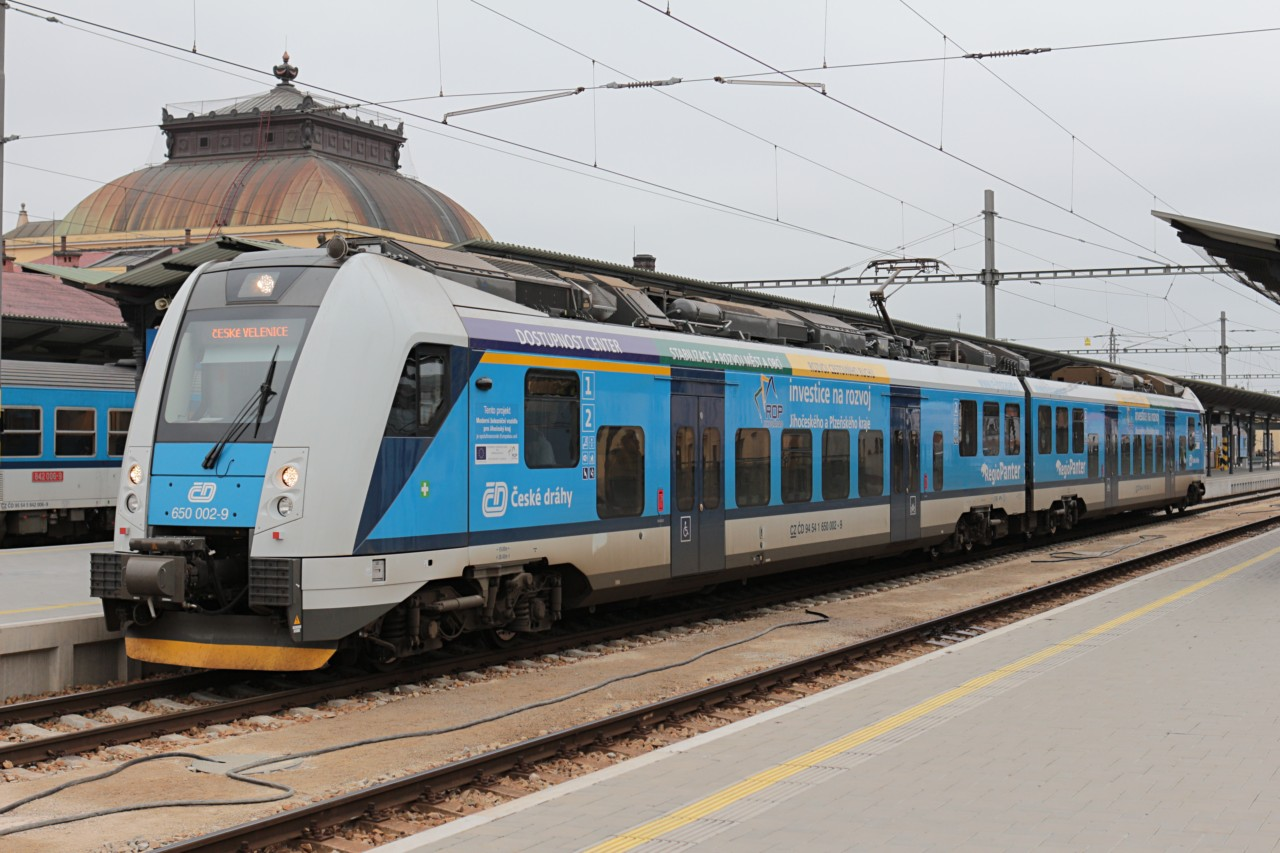
RegioPanter in České Budějovice

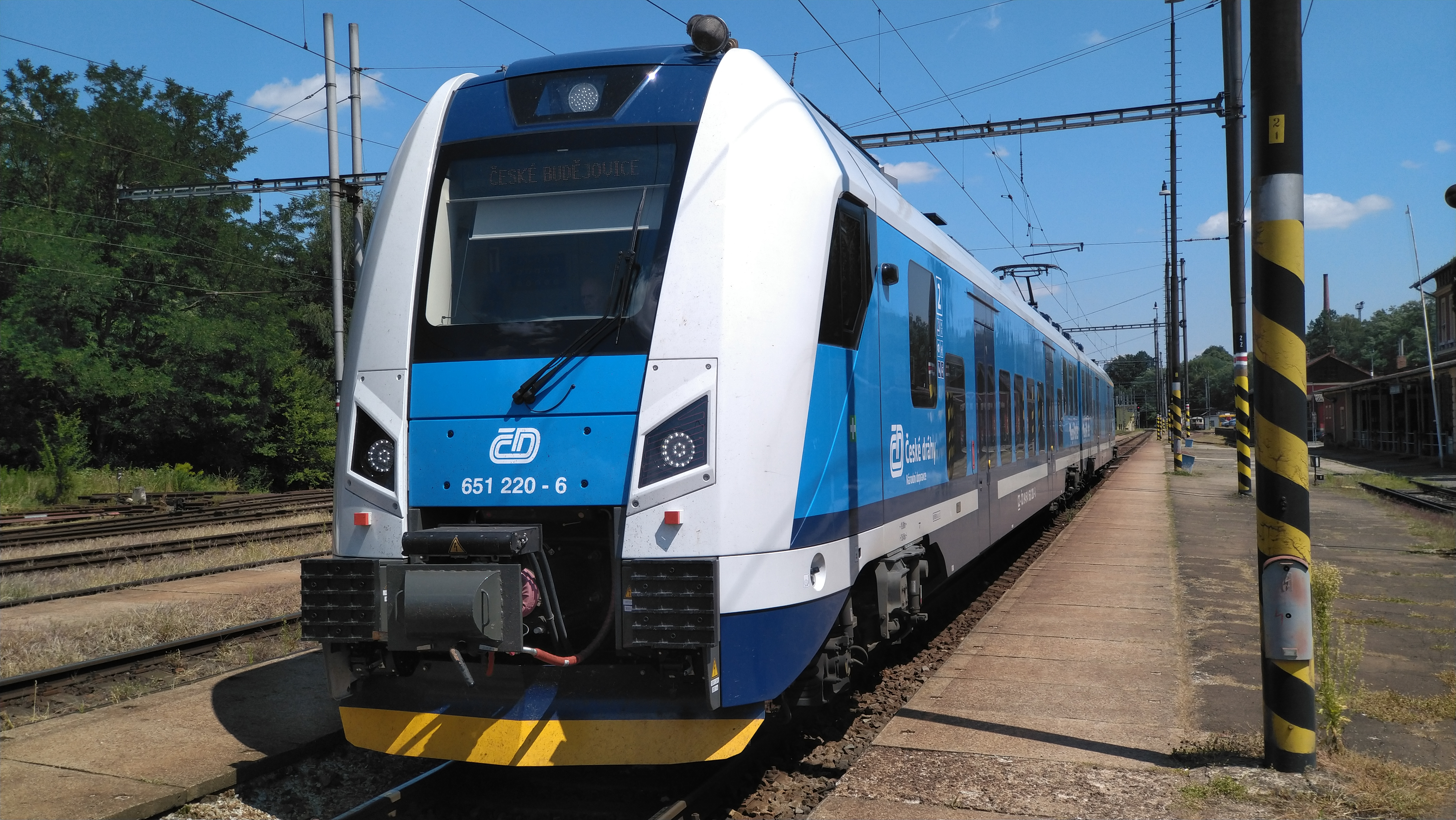
650.2 class RegioPanter in Jidřichův Hradec

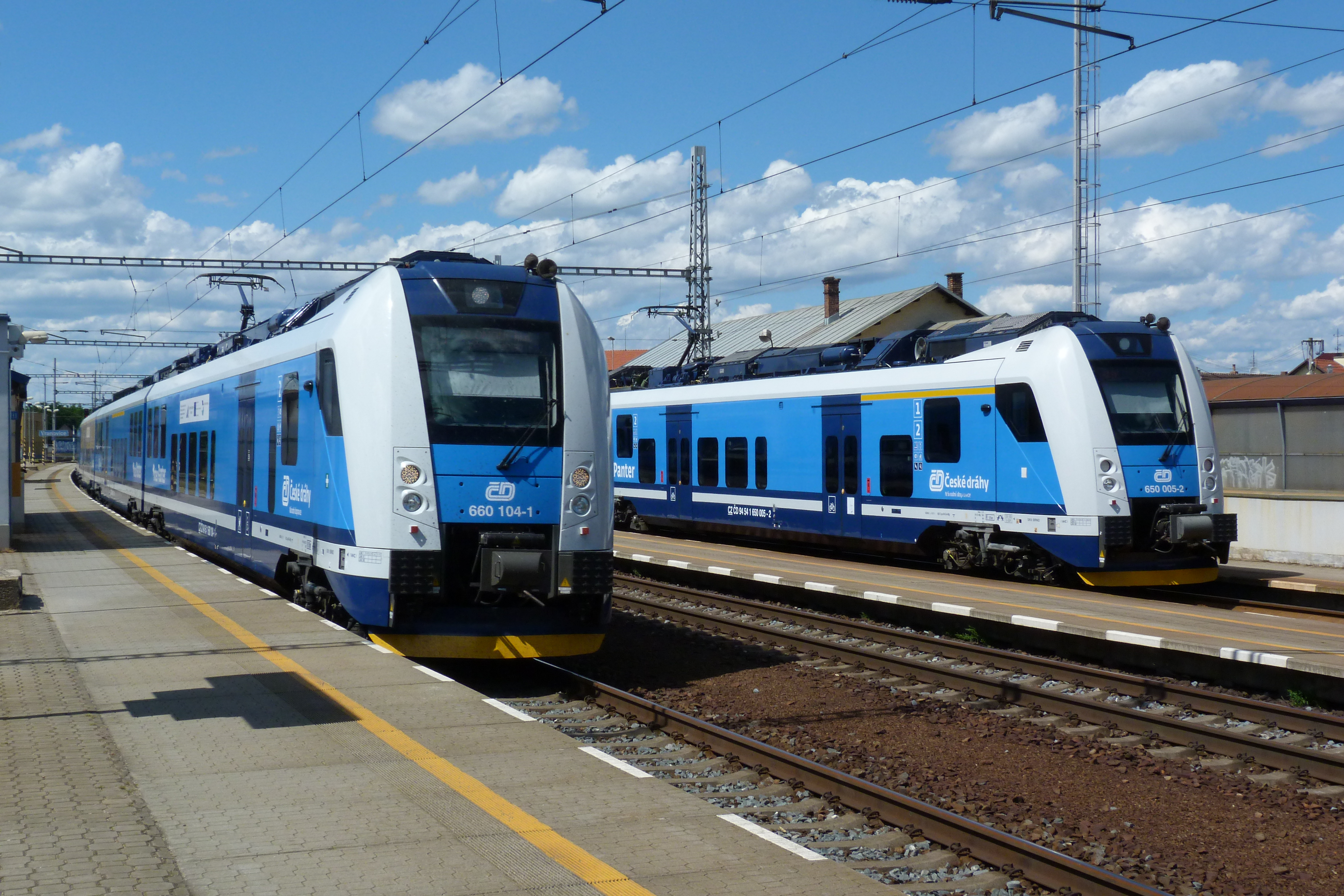
InterPanter & RegioPanter in Vranovice

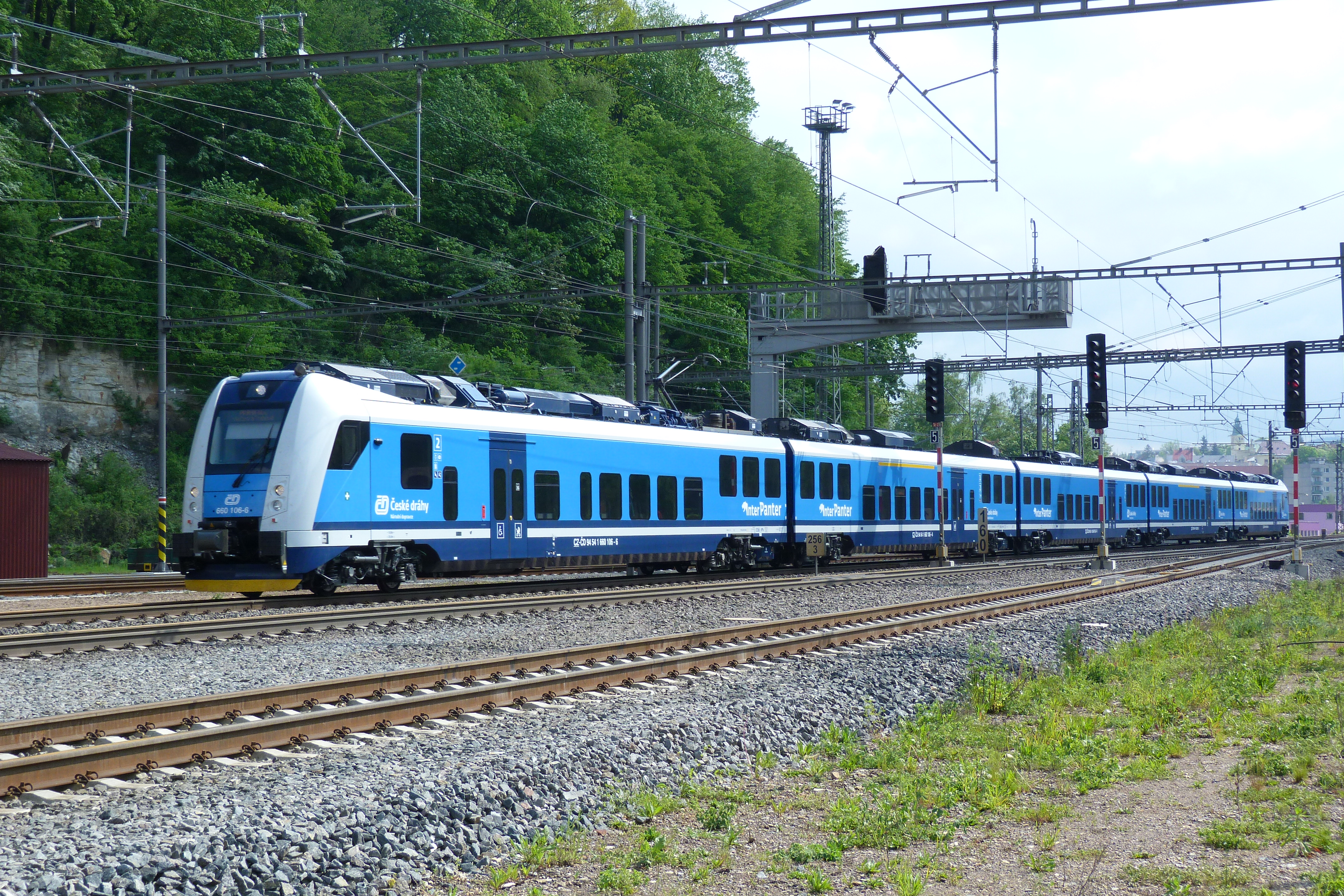
ČD Class 660.1 in Ústí nad Orlicí

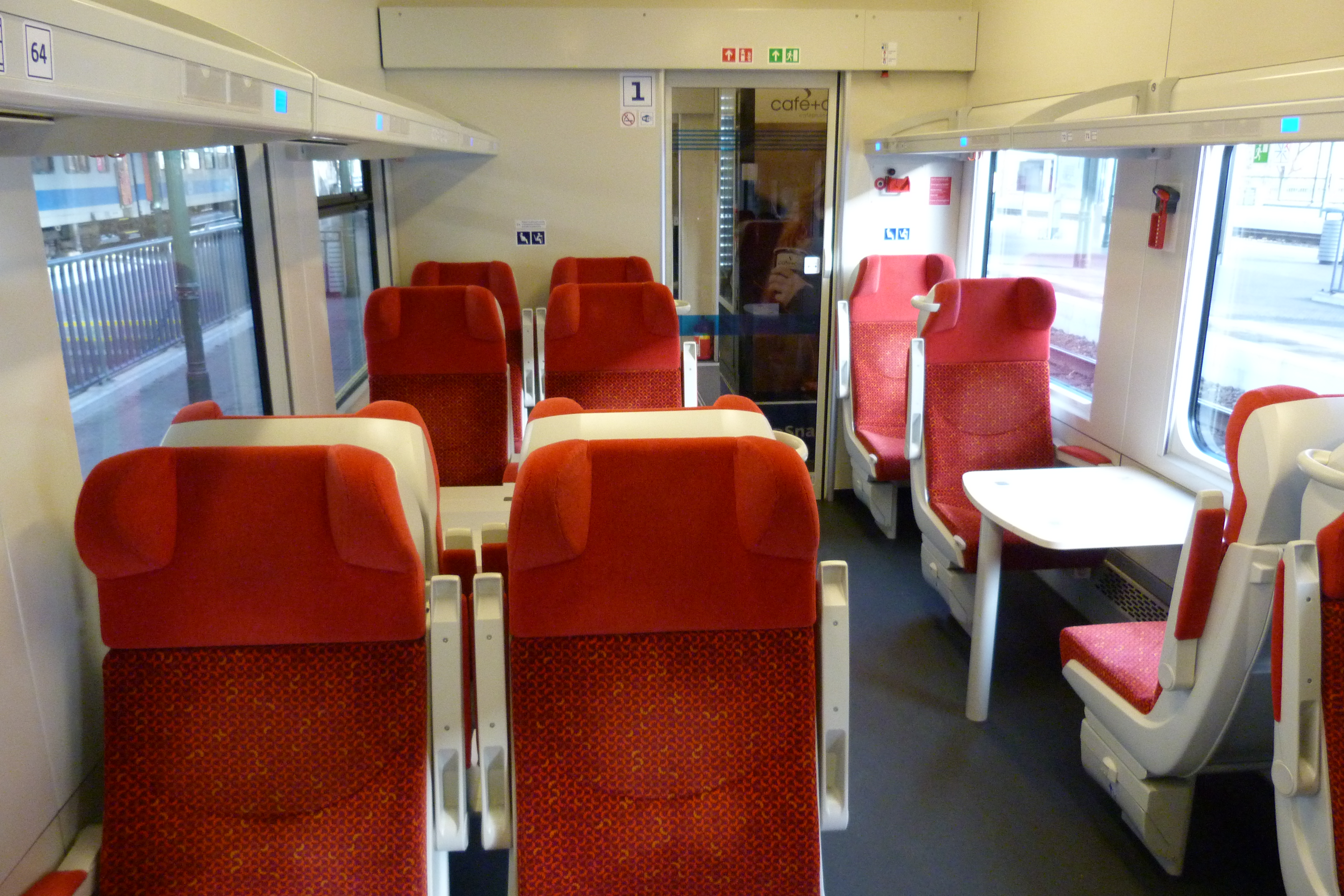
First class section of InterPanter (ČD class 660)

=== Železničná spoločnosť Slovensko (Slovakia) ===
In 2018 Škoda Transportation in consortium with ŽOS Trnava won contract with Železničná spoločnosť Slovensko to supply 8 3-car units and 2 4-car dual-voltage units. The contract included the option for additional 5 3-car units and 10 4-car units. First unit entered service on 1 December 2020 on the Žilina–Čadca–Zwardoń line.

Železničná spoločnosť Slovensko ordered in August 2021 from Škoda Transportation another nine trains for Košice region. There is also a purchase option for 11 additional trains. EMUs will enter service in 2023.

In December 2025, Skoda Group, in consortium with ŽOS Trnava and Železničná spoločnosť Slovensko (ZSSK), has signed a framework contract for the delivery of up to 36 battery-powered two-car electric trains (BEMU) with a total value of almost EUR 332 million. The Slovak carrier plans to purchase the first 16 units next year, with an option to extend deliveries by a further 20 units.

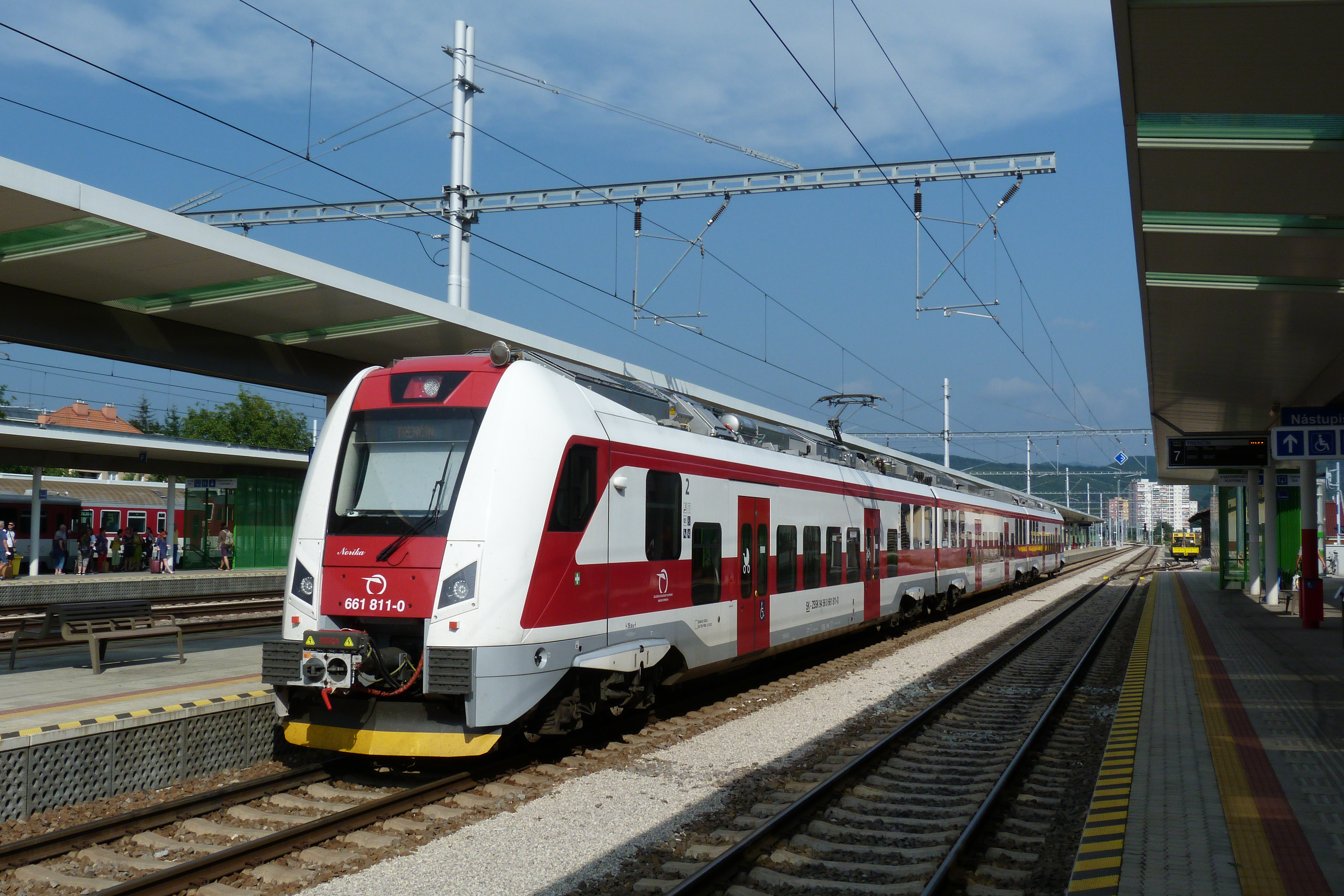
661.011 in Trenčín

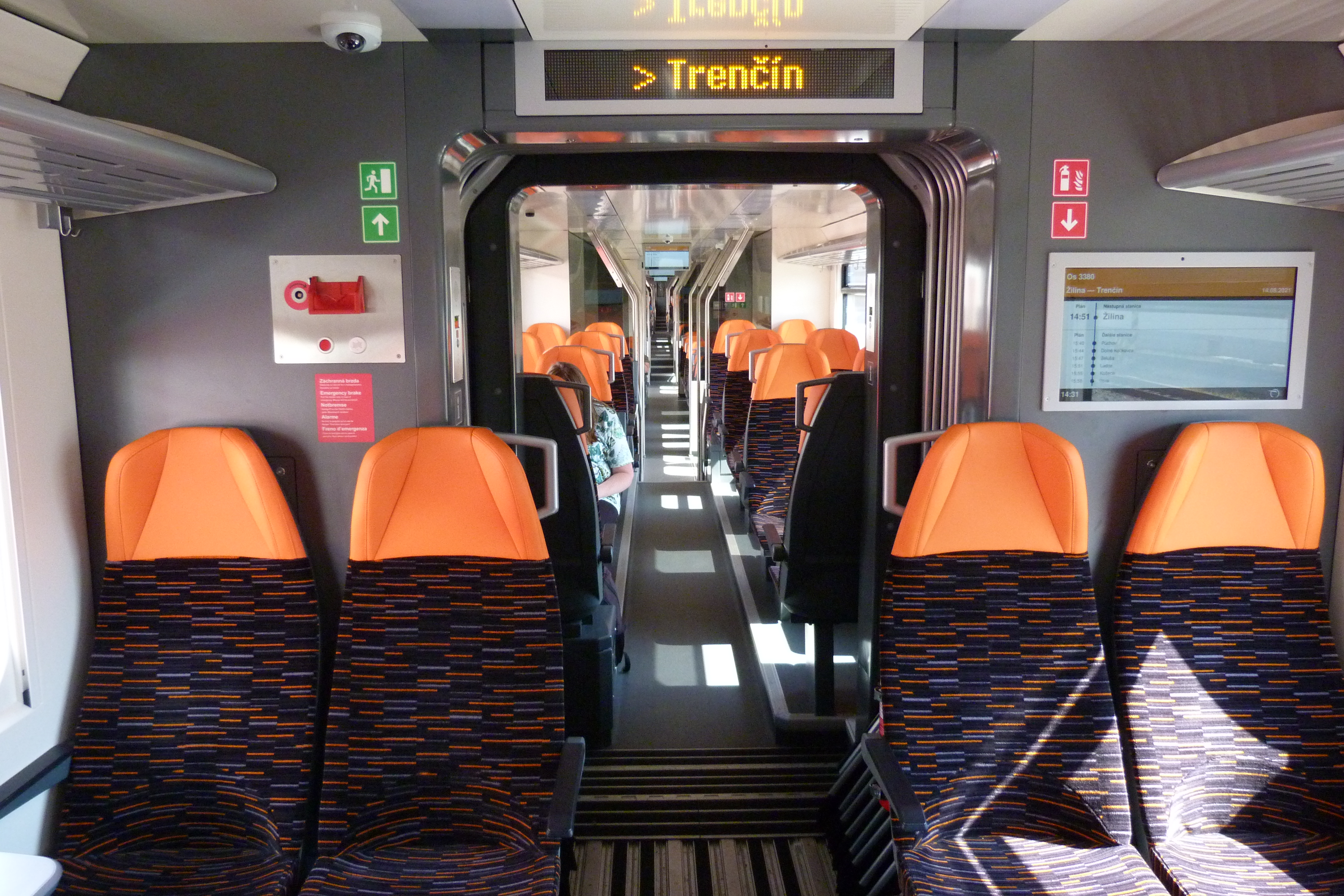
Interior of class 661 ZSSK

=== Vivi (Latvia) ===
Škoda Transportation won the tender of the Latvian passenger rail company Vivi (formerly branded as Pasažieru vilciens) to supply 32 electric multiple units for suburban lines starting in Riga. Units of the 16Ev model with 436 seats (4 cars), the 1,520 mm (4 ft 11 27/32 in) Russian gauge, wide carbody, dual system equipment (3 kV DC and 25 kV AC) and top speed up to 160 km/h (99 mph) were expected be delivered in 2022–23, however delays caused the deadline to shift to 2023–2024. The first unit began regular services in December 2023 and all units are expected to be delivered by the end of 2024.

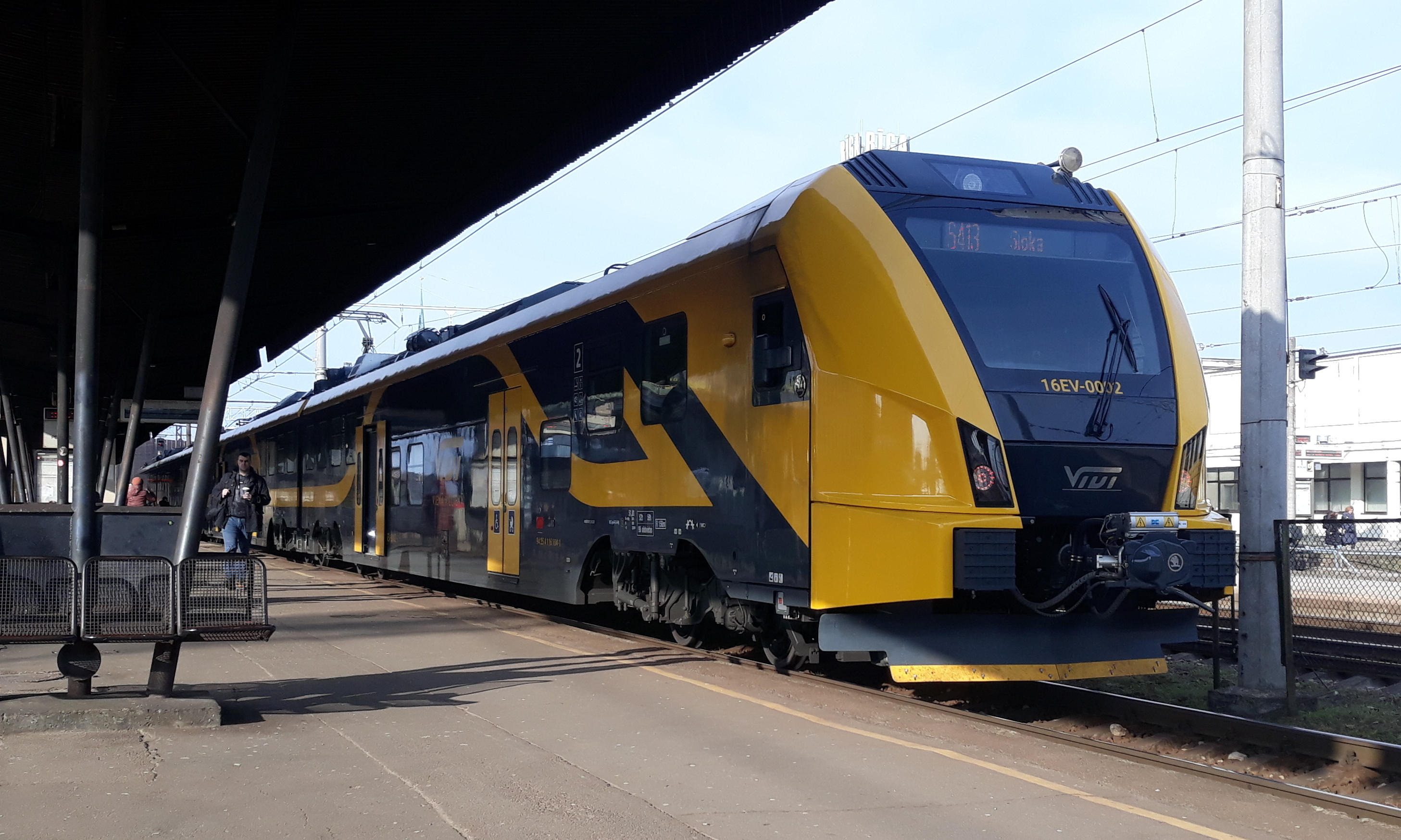
A 16ev at Riga Central Station

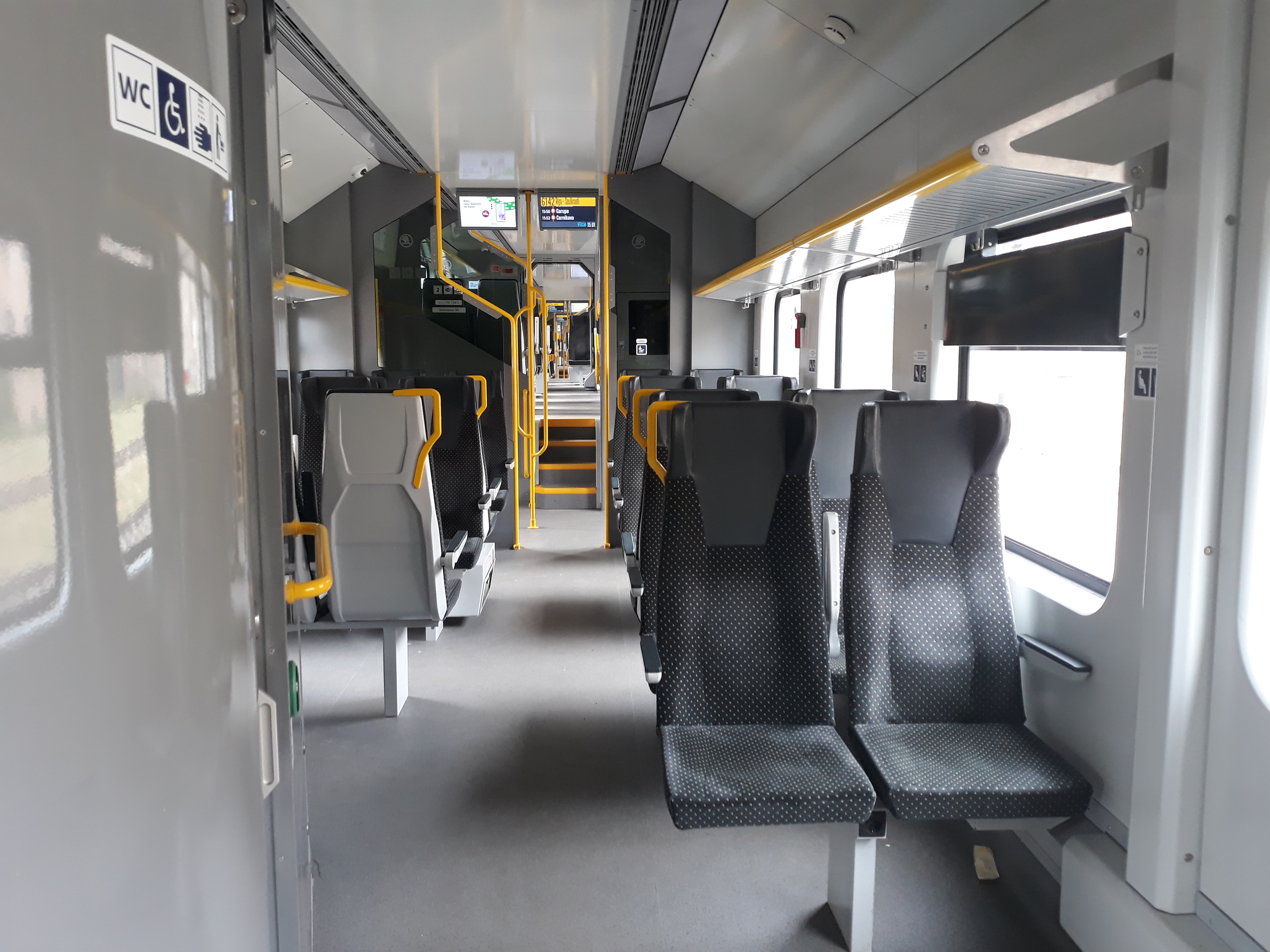
Low-floor section with the bathroom module visible on the left

=== ATD (Latvia) ===
In December 2025 Autotransporta direkcija (ATD) announces that Škoda Group has been awarded with the contract to supply up to 16 battery electric multiple units (BEMUs) for regional transport. The value of the contract, consisting of the base delivery of nine trains, an option for seven additional vehicles, spare parts and training, is nearly EUR 160 million. The first vehicles are scheduled to be deployed in the first half of 2029. The units will also be the first Škoda Group battery-powered vehicles designed for a 1,520 mm gauge. The two-car unit is designed to operate on 3 kV DC and 25 kV 50 Hz AC power supply systems. The maximum speed is 160 km/h in trolley mode and 120 km/h in battery mode. The train offers a capacity of up to 188 seats for seated passengers, 24 of which are in 1st class. The seat configuration in 2nd class is 3+2, and in 1st class it is 2+2.

=== South Moravian Region (Czech Republic) ===
In 2019 South Moravian Region in Czech Republic selected Škoda Transportation as the supplier of 37 electrical units for suburban transport of Brno. There are 31 4-car units with 333 seats and 6 2-cars units with 146 seats. The units are owned by the region and leased to contracted carriers. The trainsets are named Moravia after the first locomotive, which arrived in Brno in 1838. The individual units are named after wine varieties. The design of the units was introduced in September 2020.

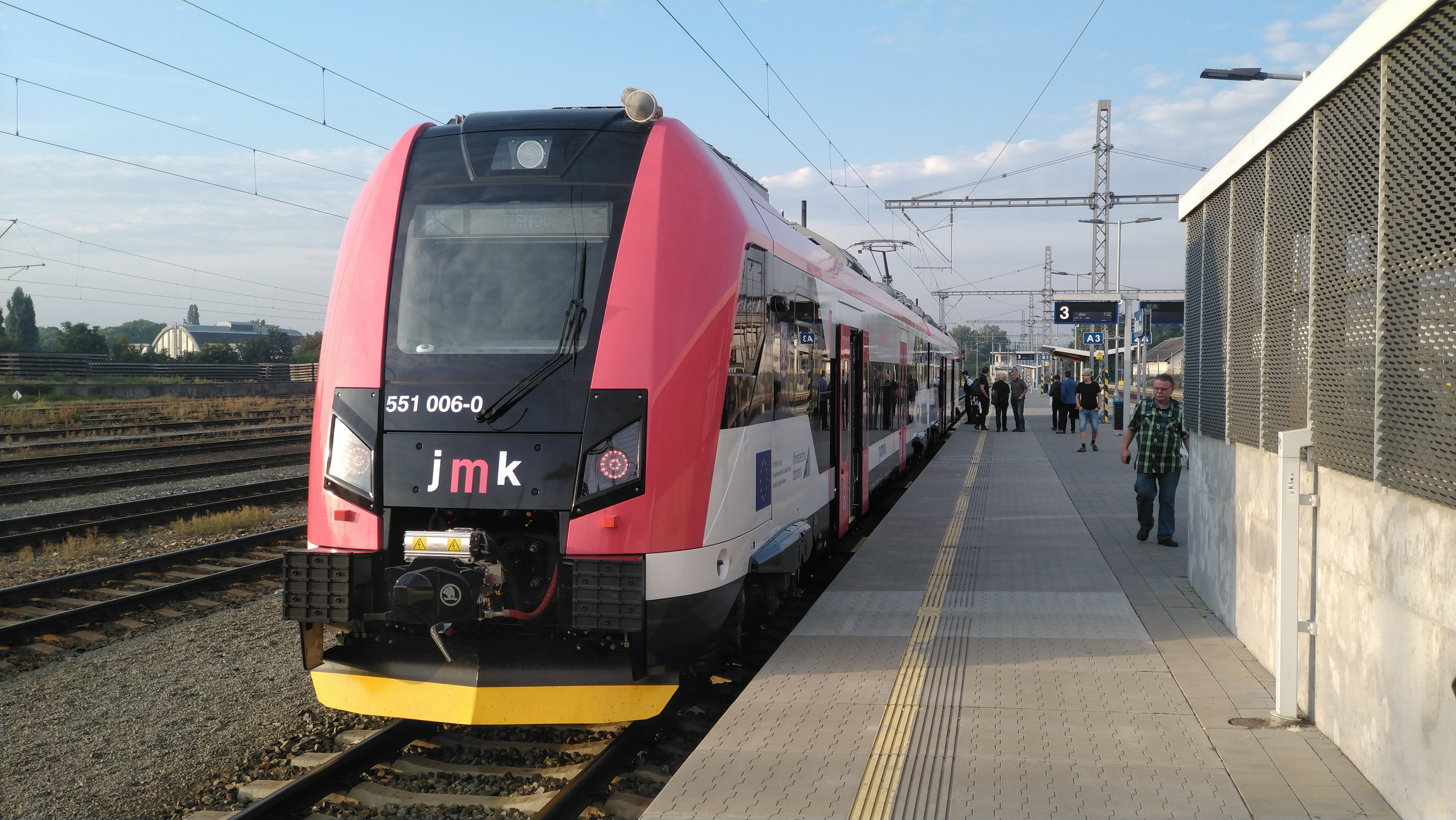
"Moravia" class 550 in Brno, dolní nádraží

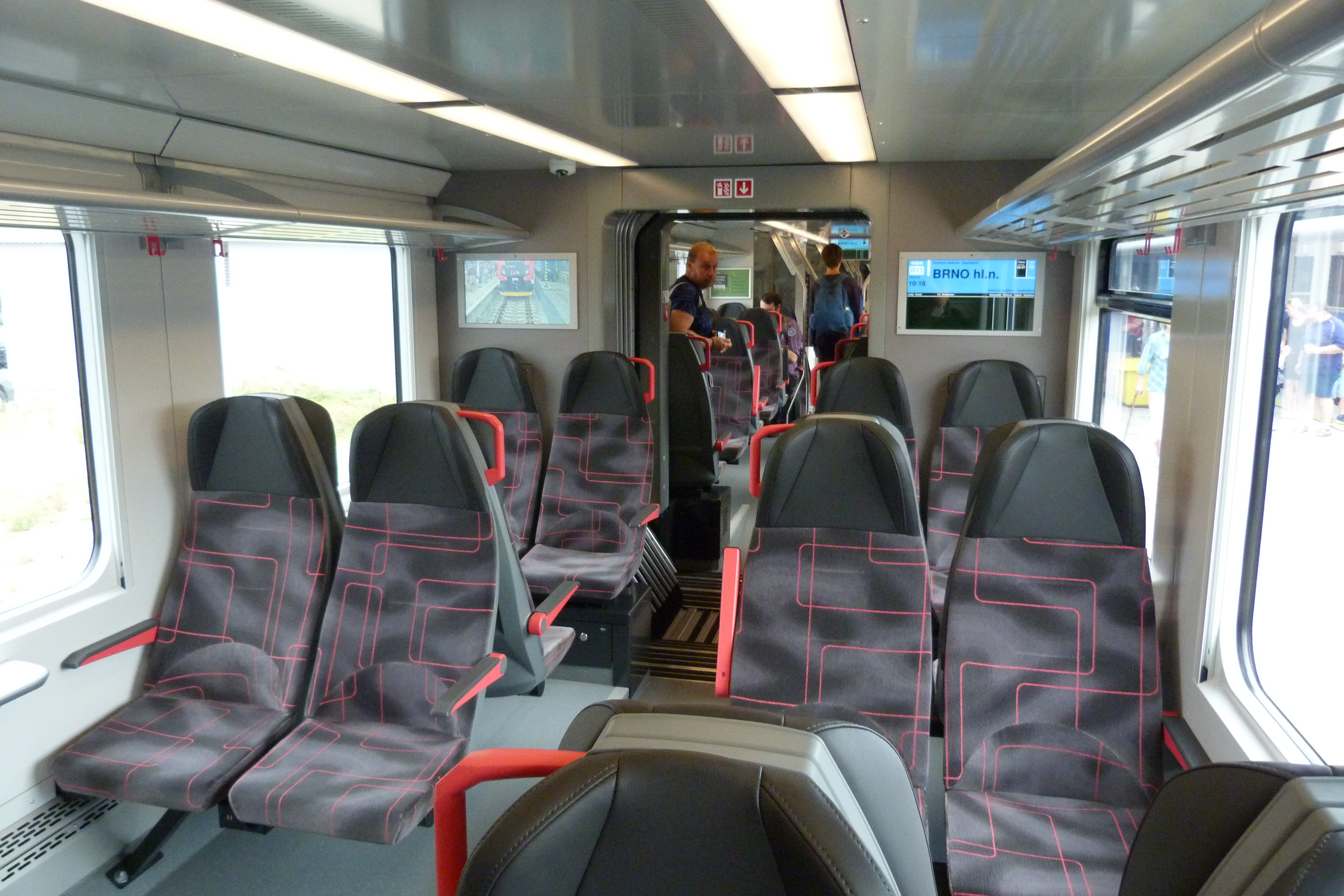
Interior of EMU class 530 "Moravia"

=== Elron (Estonia) ===
In October 2020, the Estonian state-owned railway operator Elron announced to order six electric multiple units with an option to order 10 more, which totals to 16 units. First units were introduced to the public on November 29, 2025 at the Tallinn Baltic Station and three round trips were made on the line Tallinn - Kloogaranna, with regular services beginning on the same line from December 15, 2025. Since January 5, 2026, additional services have begun on the Tallinn - Tapa line. On the Tallinn - Tartu line, units will go into operation in the second half of 2026, after the reconstruction and electrification works have been completed. In January 2023 Škoda produced 11 long-distance and 5 suburban dual system electric trains (Škoda 21Ev, InterPanter), which have a number of replaceable seats allowing space for bicycles in warm months, while providing more seating in colder months. The cost of the initial six trains was €56.2 million, rising to €146.8 million with the 10 additional sets. The first of these new sets was delivered to Estonia in April 2025, and entered service on Tallinn's suburban lines on 15 December 2025. The long-distance sets were initially due to begin operating on the electrified Tallinn-Tartu route, however due to the lack of electrification past Tartu, they will initially also serve these short-distance routes. They will operate the country's passenger train system next to 38 Stadler FLIRT units.

=== Uzbekistan Railways ===
In 2023, Škoda sold 30 trains for €320 million to Uzbekistan Railways.

=== Bulgarian State Railways ===
In 2024, Škoda won a contract for 511.4 million lev from the Bulgarian transport ministry to supply 25 electric units, as well as staff training, and 15 years of maintenance.

Interior of BDŽ class 35 EMU

Interior of BDŽ class 35 EMU

=== RegioJet (Czech Republic) ===
In May 2024, RegioJet awarded Škoda a contract to supply 15 two-car and 8 three-car units, totaling 23 units, for 3.5 billion CZK. These units are to be operated on train lines U1, U2, U3, U32, U51 and U54 in the Ústí nad Labem Region by December 2026.

In September 2025, RegioJet awarded Škoda a contract to supply 18 two-car and 16 three-car tri-mode units, totaling 34 units, for over 9 billion CZK. These units are to be operated on national lines R14A, R14B, R21, R22, and R24.

== Cancelled contracts ==
=== National Express ===
In 2015 National Express Germany won a 12-year contract to operate Nuremberg S-Bahn services from December 2018. Its bid included 38 5-car 7Ev trainsets owned by a leasing company. The total value of the contract would have exceeded €380 million. However, in 2016 National Express pulled out of the bid and order was cancelled.

== Fleet details ==
Country	Operator / owner	Class	Image	Škoda type / name	Units	Formation / seats	Power supply	Built / delivery
Czech Republic	České dráhy	640		7Ev RegioPanter	8	3-car 241 seats	3 kV DC 25 kV 50 Hz AC	2012–2014
Czech Republic	České dráhy	640.1 (formerly 440)		7Ev RegioPanter	12	3-car 241 seats	3 kV DC 25 kV 50 Hz AC	2012–2014 rebuilt 2021–2022
Czech Republic	České dráhy	640.2		20Ev RegioPanter	60	3-car 234 seats	3 kV DC 25 kV 50 Hz AC	2022–2024
Czech Republic	České dráhy	650		7Ev RegioPanter	8	2-car 147 seats	3 kV DC 25 kV 50 Hz AC	2012–2018
Czech Republic	České dráhy	650.2		15Ev RegioPanter	46	2-car 140 seats	3 kV DC 25 kV 50 Hz AC	2020–2024
Czech Republic	České dráhy	660.0		10Ev InterPanter	4	3-car 200 seats	3 kV DC 25 kV 50 Hz AC	2015–2016
Czech Republic	České dráhy	660.1		10Ev InterPanter	10	5-car 350 seats	3 kV DC 25 kV 50 Hz AC	2015–2016
Czech Republic	České dráhy	690.2		15Ev3 RegioPanter BEMU	4	2-car 140 seats	3 kV DC 25 kV 50 Hz AC battery	2024
Czech Republic	České dráhy	690	—	15Ev5 RegioPanter BEMU	15 ordered	2-car 150 seats	3 kV DC 25 kV 50 Hz AC battery	2026–2027
Czech Republic	Arriva	650	—	7Ev RegioPanter	9	2-car 147 seats	3 kV DC 25 kV 50 Hz AC	2018 transferred 2023
Czech Republic	South Moravian Region	550		19Ev Moravia	6	2-car 146 seats	25 kV 50 Hz AC	2022
Czech Republic	South Moravian Region	530		18Ev Moravia	31	4-car 333 seats	25 kV 50 Hz AC	2022–2023
Czech Republic	RegioJet	650.2	—	15Ev RegioPanter	15	2-car 142 seats	3 kV DC 25 kV 50 Hz AC	2025–2026
Czech Republic	RegioJet	640.2	—	20Ev RegioPanter	8	3-car 228 seats	3 kV DC 25 kV 50 Hz AC	2025–2026
Czech Republic	RegioJet	692	—	27Ev BEDMU	18 ordered	2-car 120 seats	3 kV DC 25 kV 50 Hz AC battery + diesel	2027–2029
Czech Republic	RegioJet	—	—	27Ev BEDMU	16 ordered	3-car 197 seats	3 kV DC 25 kV 50 Hz AC battery + diesel	2027–2029
Slovakia	Železničná spoločnosť Slovensko	660		14Ev Panter	32	4-car 343 or 337 seats	3 kV DC 25 kV 50 Hz AC	2020–2021; 2023–2026
Slovakia	Železničná spoločnosť Slovensko	661		14Ev Panter	13	3-car 247 seats	3 kV DC 25 kV 50 Hz AC	2020–2021
Slovakia	Železničná spoločnosť Slovensko	—	—	RegioPanter BEMU	16 ordered + 20 options	2-car 157 seats	3 kV DC 25 kV 50 Hz AC battery	from 2026
Latvia	Vivi	16Ev		16Ev RegioPanter	32	4-car 436 seats	3 kV DC convertible to 25 kV 50 Hz AC	2022–2024
Latvia	Autotransporta direkcija (ATD)	—	—	RegioPanter BEMU	9 ordered + 7 options	2-car 188 seats	3 kV DC 25 kV 50 Hz AC battery	from 2029
Estonia	Elron	—		21Ev RegioPanter	16	3-car 236 seats (11 intercity) 262 seats (5 suburban)	3 kV DC 25 kV 50 Hz AC	2024–2026
Uzbekistan	Uzbek Railways	—	—	—	10 planned	—	—	from 2026
Bulgaria	Bulgarian State Railways	34		18Ev2 RegioPanter	20 delivered + 5 ordered	4-car 333 seats	25 kV 50 Hz AC	2025–

== See also ==
- Škoda Works
- List of Škoda Transportation products
