= ČD Class 380 =

Czech Škoda locomotive

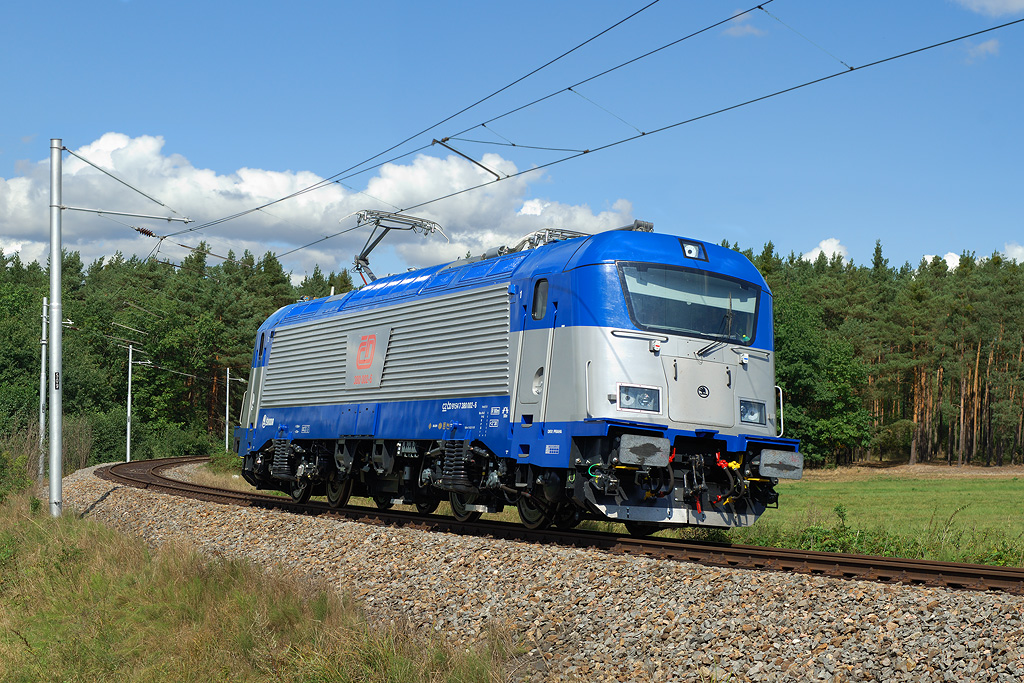
- 380 002-6 on test at Cerhenice
Type and origin
- Power type: Electric
- Builder: Škoda Transportation
- Model: 109E
- Build date: 2008 – 2011
- Total produced: 20
Specifications
- Configuration
  - UIC: Bo'Bo'
- Gauge: 1,435 mm (4 ft 8 1/2 in) standard gauge
- Wheel diameter: 1,250 mm (4 ft 1 in)
- Wheelbase: Bogie=2,500 mm (8 ft 2 in); Total=11,200 mm (36 ft 9 in)
- Length: 18,000 mm (59 ft 1 in)
- Width: 3,080 mm (10 ft 1 in)
- Height: 4,275 mm (14 ft 0.3 in)
- Axle load: 22 tonnes (22 long tons; 24 short tons)
- Adhesive weight: 22 tonnes (22 long tons; 24 short tons)
- Loco weight: 87.6 tonnes (86.2 long tons; 96.6 short tons)
- Electric system/s: 3 kV DC; 25 kV 50 Hz AC; 15 kV 16.7 Hz AC
- Current pickup: pantograph
- Traction motors: ML 4550 K/6
- Loco brake: (?)
Performance figures
- Maximum speed: 200 km/h (124 mph)
- Power output: 6,400 kW (8,583 hp)
- Tractive effort: starting 274 kN or 300 kN
Career
- Operators: České dráhy
- Class: ČD 380
- Number in class: 20
- Numbers: 380 001-8 — 380 020-8

The Class 380 is a tri-voltage electric locomotive manufactured by Škoda for České dráhy.

== History ==
The Class 380 is Škoda's entry into the modern electric locomotive market. Internally designated Type 109E, the locomotives were originally conceived in 2004 and designed for operation in Austria, Germany, Hungary, Poland and Slovakia as well as the Czech Republic. The 109E Škoda has a top speed of 200 km/h and is compatible with both AC and DC catenaries, as is expected of current multisystem locomotives. The locomotives are equipped to work on three electrification systems: 3 kV DC, 25 kV 50 Hz AC and 15 kV 16.7 Hz AC, drawing power from overhead lines.

Electric locomotive 380.011-7 of České dráhy with the „Vlakem na EURO“ livery

In 2005 České dráhy (ČD) ordered 20 locomotives with delivery in 2009 and certifications for service in all of the above-mentioned countries. The first locomotive was not delivered until 2010 and lacked any national service certification (only trial service certification for the Czech Republic). As a result, České dráhy refused to accept the locomotives.

In April 2013 the locomotive received the TSI certificate and in 2015 an arbitration court ruled on the protracted dispute between ČD and Škoda Transportation regarding the late delivery of the locomotives. While the German railway authority granted approval for the locomotives at up to 200km/h in Germany, their planned use on the Prague - Dresden - Berlin - Hamburg route never happened, with ČD choosing to lease Siemens Vectron locomotives instead.

== Orders of similar locomotives ==
Despite the problems with the approval of CD locomotives, in 2013 Deutsche Bahn signed a contract with Skoda for 6 locomotives of 109E type, designated Class 102 in Germany. The contract was also for push-pull carriages to be deployed with the locomotives on RegionalExpress services on the Munich - Nuremberg High Speed Line. TSI Certification was granted for the trains in November 2018, almost two years after the expected start of service with the trains, with the expectation of services beginning in 2019.

== See also ==
- List of České dráhy locomotive classes
- List of Škoda Transportation products
