= Škoda 109E =

Model of Czech electric locomotive

Škoda 109E Emil Zátopek
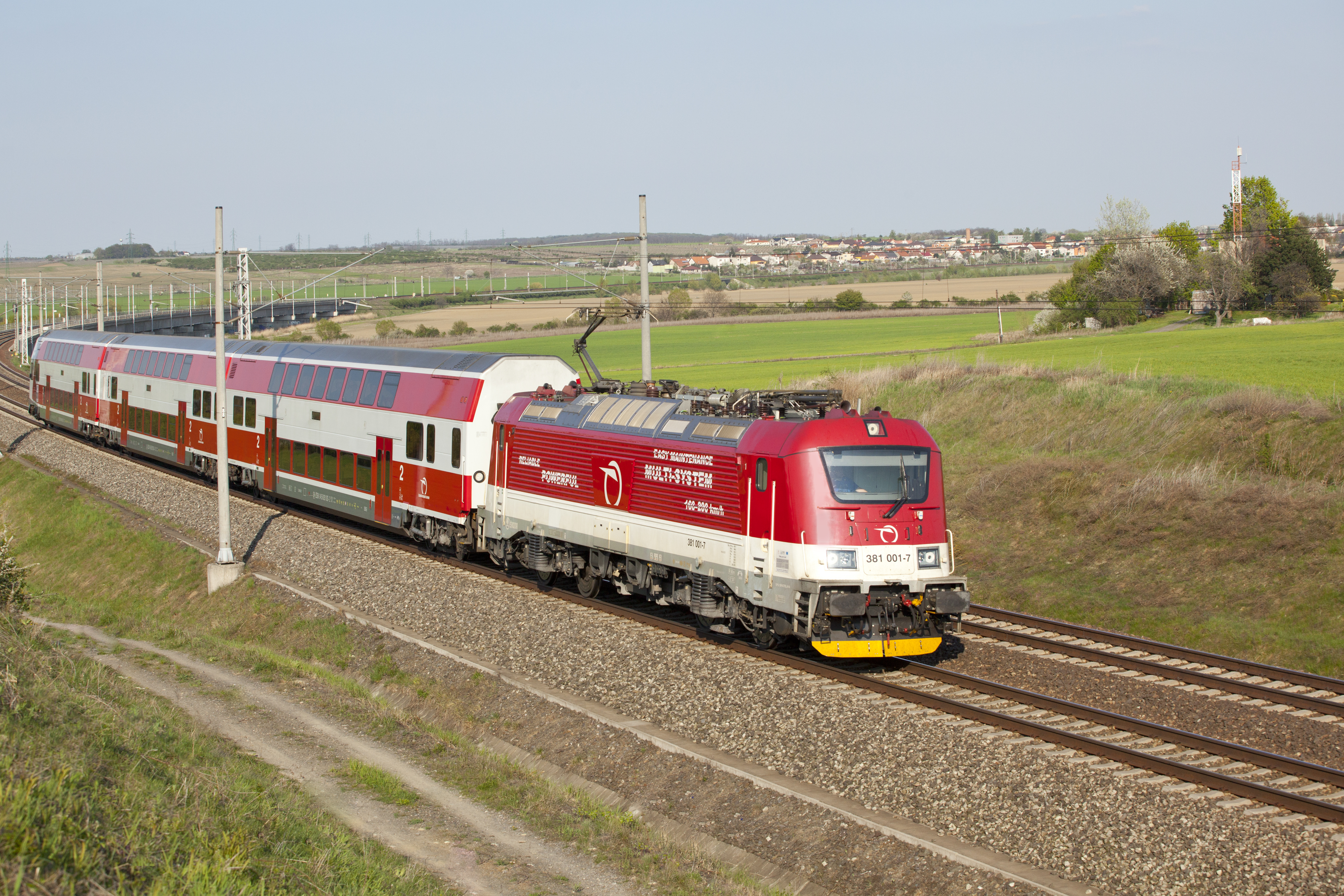
Type and origin
- Power type: Electric
- Builder: Škoda Transportation
- Model: 109E Model Series
- Build date: 2008~ , Delivered 2010
- Total produced: 28
Specifications
- Configuration
  - UIC: Bo′Bo′
- Gauge: 1.435 metres (56.5 in)
- Wheel diameter: 1.250 metres (49.2 in)
- Wheelbase: 2.500 metres (98.4 in) (98.43in)
- Length: 18.00 metres (709 in)=Total
- Width: 3.080 metres (121.3 in)
- Height: 4.275 metres (168.3 in)
- Loco weight: 87.60 tonnes (193,100 lb)
- Electric system/s: 3 kV DC; 25 kV 50 Hz AC; 15 kV 16.7 Hz AC
- Current pickup: Pantograph
- Traction motors: ML 4550 K/6
- Loco brake: 226kN
Performance figures
- Maximum speed: 200 kilometres per hour (124 mph)
- Power output: 6,400 kilowatts (8,583 hp)
- Tractive effort: 274~300kN Starting
Career
- Operators: České dráhy ZSSK; DB Regio
- Class: ČD 380; ZSSK 381; DB 102

The Škoda 109E locomotive (also marketed as Emil Zátopek locomotive) was originally conceived in 2004 and designed for operation in Austria, Germany, Hungary, Poland and Slovakia as well as the Czech Republic. The 109E Škoda has a top speed of 200 km/h and is compatible with both AC and DC catenaries, meeting the basic characteristics of a modern multisystem locomotive.

== ČD Class 380 ==
In 2005 České dráhy ordered 20 locomotives with delivery in 2009 and certifications for service in all of the above-mentioned countries. The first locomotive was actually delivered in 2010 and lacked any national service certification (only trial service certification for the Czech Republic), as result České dráhy refused to accept the locomotives. In April 2013 the locomotive class received its TSI certificate and the manufacturer hopes that it will receive national service certifications soon (especially for Czech Republic, Austria and Poland).

== ZSSK Class 381 ==
Škoda's first export order for 109Es came from ZSSK in Slovakia. Initially two locomotives were ordered. These were made at the Škoda factory in Plzeň. They have a licensed top speed of 160 km/h (99 mph), the maximum speed on Slovak Railways, and are fitted with GSM-R/ETCS Level 1. The locomotive class received Slovak service certification in 2012. Locomotives are designated as class 381 of ZSSK, numbers 381.001-7 & 381.002-5 and are being used mostly on regional trains on the Bratislava - Galanta - Nové Zámky route.

== DB Class 102 ==
In June 2013 Škoda Transportation announced that it won a tender for 6 Push–pull trainsets for DB Regio including 6 109Es designated as DB Class 102. The tender included a requirement for 190 km/h (118 mph) speed, as the trainsets will be used on the Nuremberg–Munich high-speed railway. Trainsets were expected to be delivered in 2016. But the vehicles were not authorized by EBA authority until 2019, yet with restrictions. DB Regio refused to accept the trains due to poor reliability, with the fleet finally beginning entry to service on 12 October 2020, some four years late.

== See also ==
- List of Škoda Transportation products
