= Vranovice (Brno-Country District) =

- Municipality
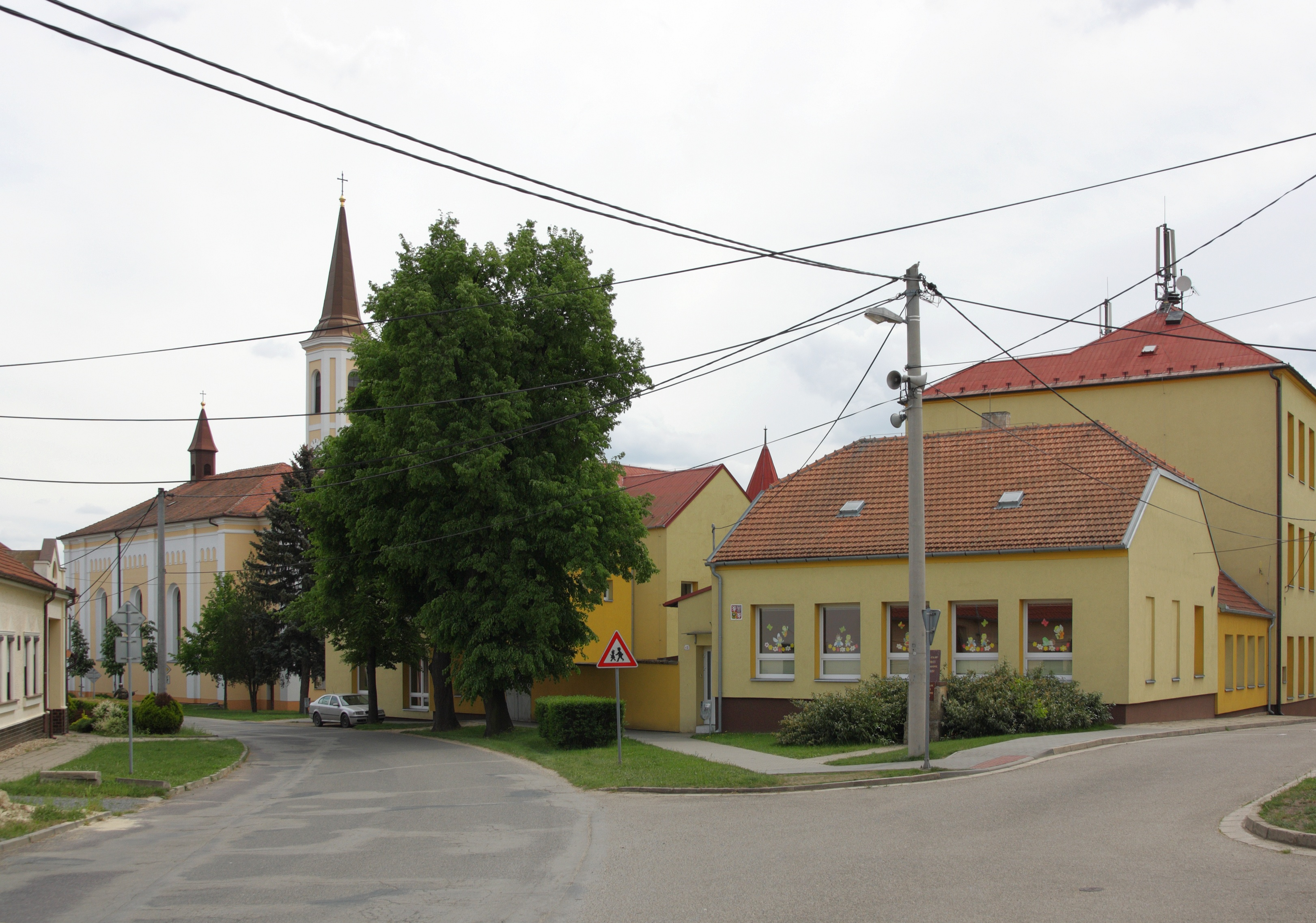
- Centre of Vranovice

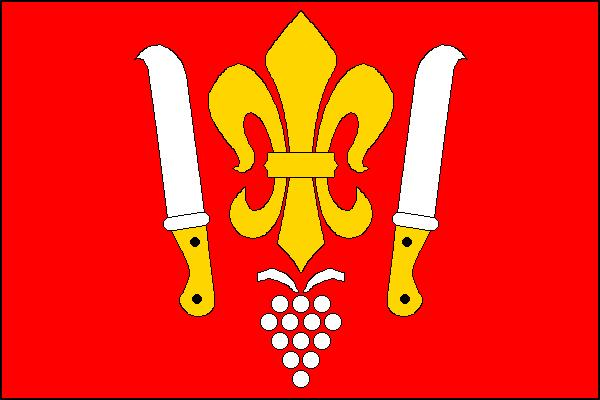
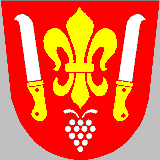
- Flag Coat of arms

- Location in the Czech Republic
- Coordinates: 48°57′58″N 16°36′24″E
- Country: Czech Republic
- Region: South Moravian
- District: Brno-Country
- First mentioned: 1257

Area
  - Total: 13.83 km^{2} (5.34 sq mi)
- Elevation: 177 m (581 ft)

Population (2026-01-01)
  - Total: 2,426
  - Density: 175.4/km^{2} (454.3/sq mi)
- Time zone: UTC+1 (CET)
  - Summer (DST): UTC+2 (CEST)
- Postal code: 691 25
- Website: vranovice.eu

Vranovice is a municipality and village in Brno-Country District in the South Moravian Region of the Czech Republic. It has about 2,400 inhabitants.

== Geography ==
Vranovice is located about 24 kilometres (15 mi) south of Brno. It lies in a flat landscape in the Dyje–Svratka Valley. The Svratka River flows along the southern municipal border.

== History ==
The first written mention of Vranovice is from 1257. Until the 19th century, the village was entirely agricultural and wine-growing. From 1257 to 1527, the village was owned by the Premonstratensian convent in Dolní Kounice. After the convent was abolished, Vranovice was owned by various lower noblemen. After the Battle of White Mountain in 1620, the village was acquired by the Dietrichstein family. The last noble owners were the Herbestein family.

Until the 19th century, the inhabitants made a living from agriculture and viticulture. In 1839, the railway was built, which helped the development of the village. In the same year, Vranovice became the site of the first train collision in continental Europe, when two steam locomotives collided at the local train station.

== Demographics ==
Historical population

Year	Pop.	±%
1869	1,028	—
1880	1,259	+22.5%
1890	1,435	+14.0%
1900	1,554	+8.3%
1910	1,592	+2.4%

Year	Pop.	±%
1921	1,774	+11.4%
1930	1,908	+7.6%
1950	1,888	−1.0%
1961	2,020	+7.0%
1970	1,913	−5.3%

Year	Pop.	±%
1980	1,907	−0.3%
1991	1,879	−1.5%
2001	1,925	+2.4%
2011	2,047	+6.3%
2021	2,486	+21.4%

Source: Censuses

== Transport ==
Vranovice is located on the railway line Tišnov–Hustopeče via Brno.

== Sights ==
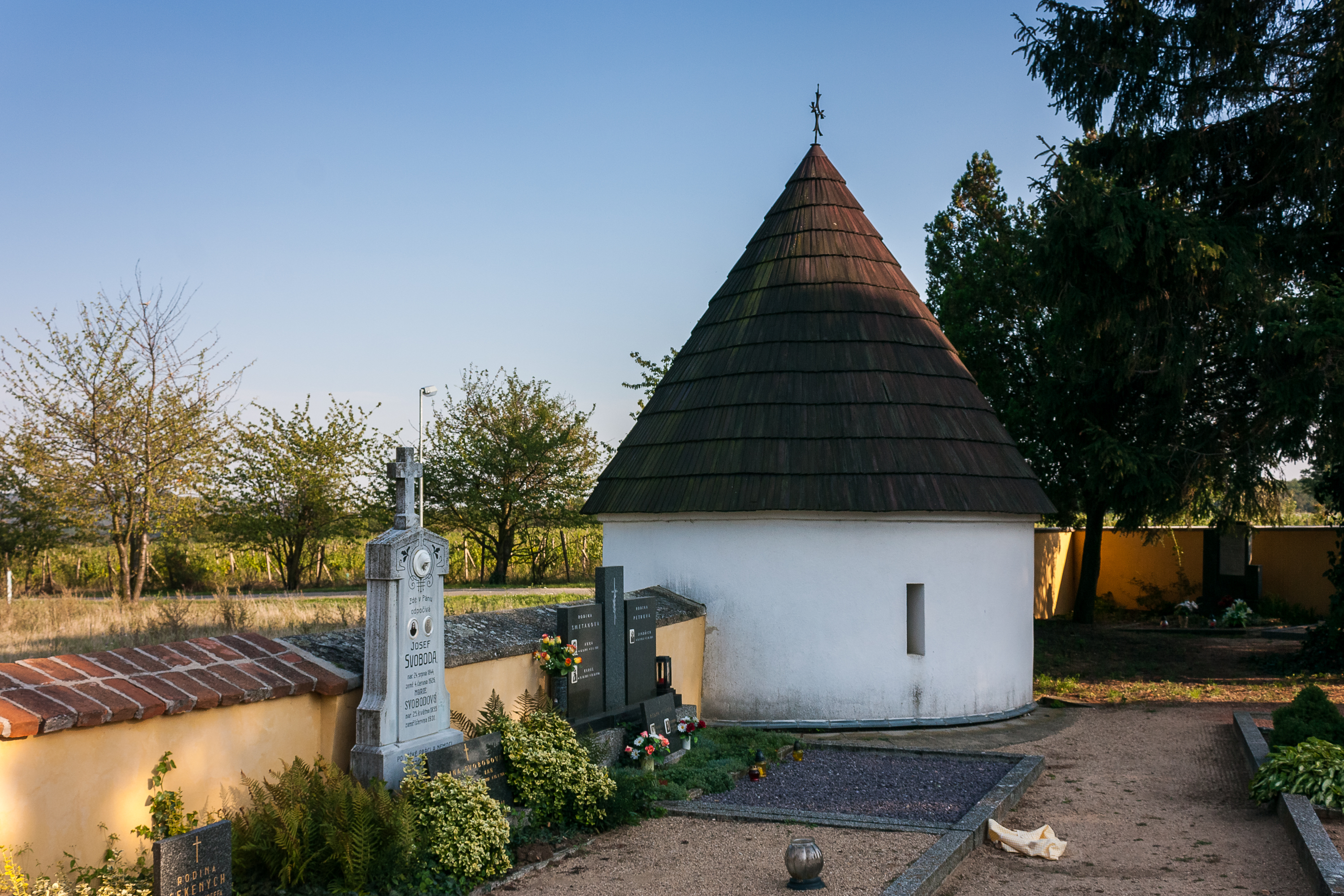
Ossuary

The main landmark of Vranovice is the Church of the Visitation of the Virgin Mary. It was built in 1868–1870.

The Chapel of Our Lady, Mother of Good Counsel, dates from 1906. It is a small but architecturally valuable building.

A notable building is the ossuary from the 17th century, built in the cemetery wall. This small building with a distinctive conical roof is an important funeral monument.
