= Železničná spoločnosť Slovensko =

Passenger trains operated company in Slovakia

Železničná spoločnosť Slovensko, a.s.

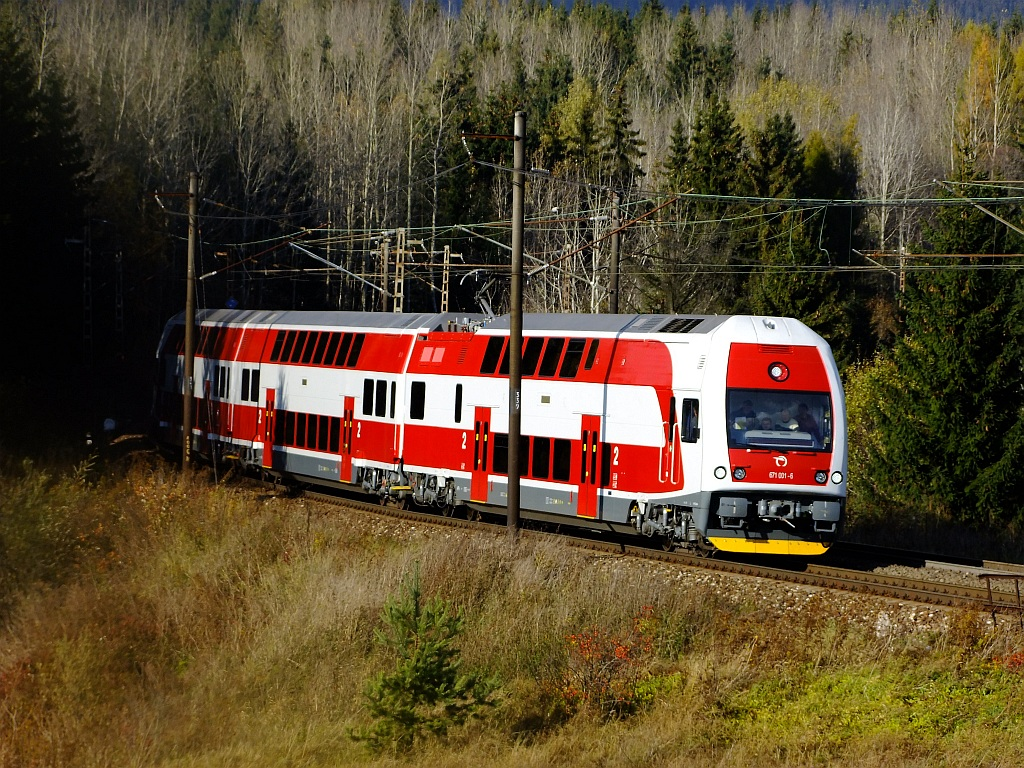
- A ZSSK class 671 train
- Type: Fully state-owned limited company (a.s.)
- Industry: Rail transport
- Predecessor: Železničná spoločnosť, a. s.
- Founded: 13 December 2004
- Headquarters: Bratislava, Slovakia
- Key people: Roman Koreň chairman of the board of directors; Karol Martinček Vice chairman of the board of directors
- Revenue: ▲€437,556 million (2020)
- Net income: ▲€10.592 million(2020)
- Total assets: ▼€1543,273 million (2020)
- Owner: Slovakia
- Number of employees: ▲5,910 (2020)
- Website: www.zssk.sk; www.slovakrail.sk

Železničná spoločnosť Slovensko, a.s. (ZSSK) (lit. 'Slovak Railway Company') is a Slovak state-owned passenger train company based in Bratislava.

In 2002, Železničná spoločnosť was established as the successor of the passenger and cargo transport subsidiaries of Železnice Slovenskej republiky. In 2005, this new company was further split into Železničná spoločnosť Slovensko providing passenger transport services and Železničná spoločnosť Cargo Slovakia (ZSSK CARGO or ZSCS) providing cargo services.

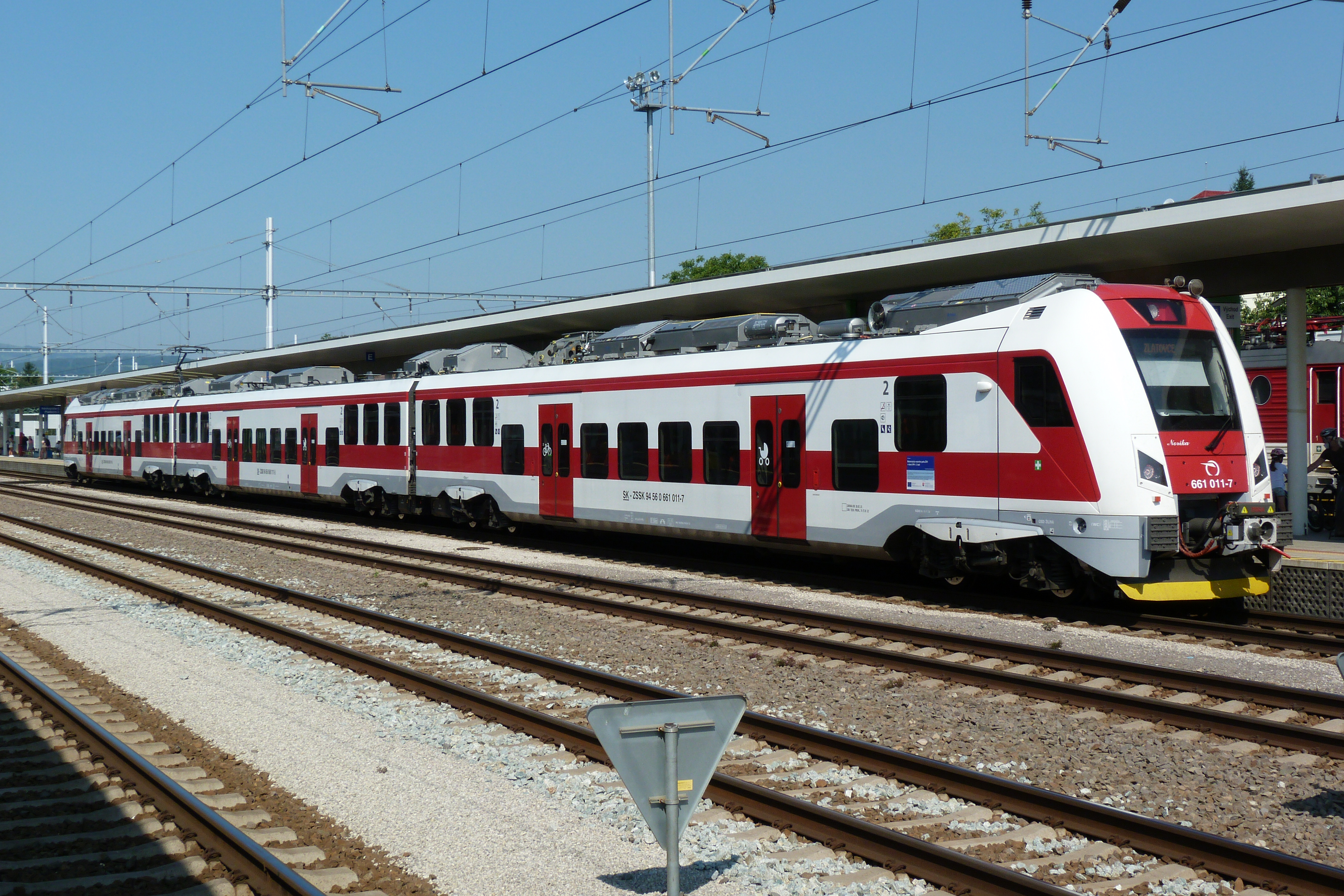
Class 661 in Trenčín

The fleet of the Železničná spoločnosť Slovensko was partially modernised with the introduction of eight 3-car units and two 4-car dual-voltage units of the new Škoda 7Ev EMUs. The contract included an option for five additional 3-car units and ten 4-car units. The company ordered another nine trains for the Košice region from Škoda Transportation in August 2021, which included an option for 11 additional trains. Further new EMUs entered service in 2023. ZSSK also purchased Stadler KISS trains in 2025, exercising options on the order after the initial delivery that fall.

In fall 2026, ZSSK launched modernized sleeper services using refurbished ex-City Night Line sleeper cars.
