= Tatra KT4 =

Four-axle type articulated tramcar

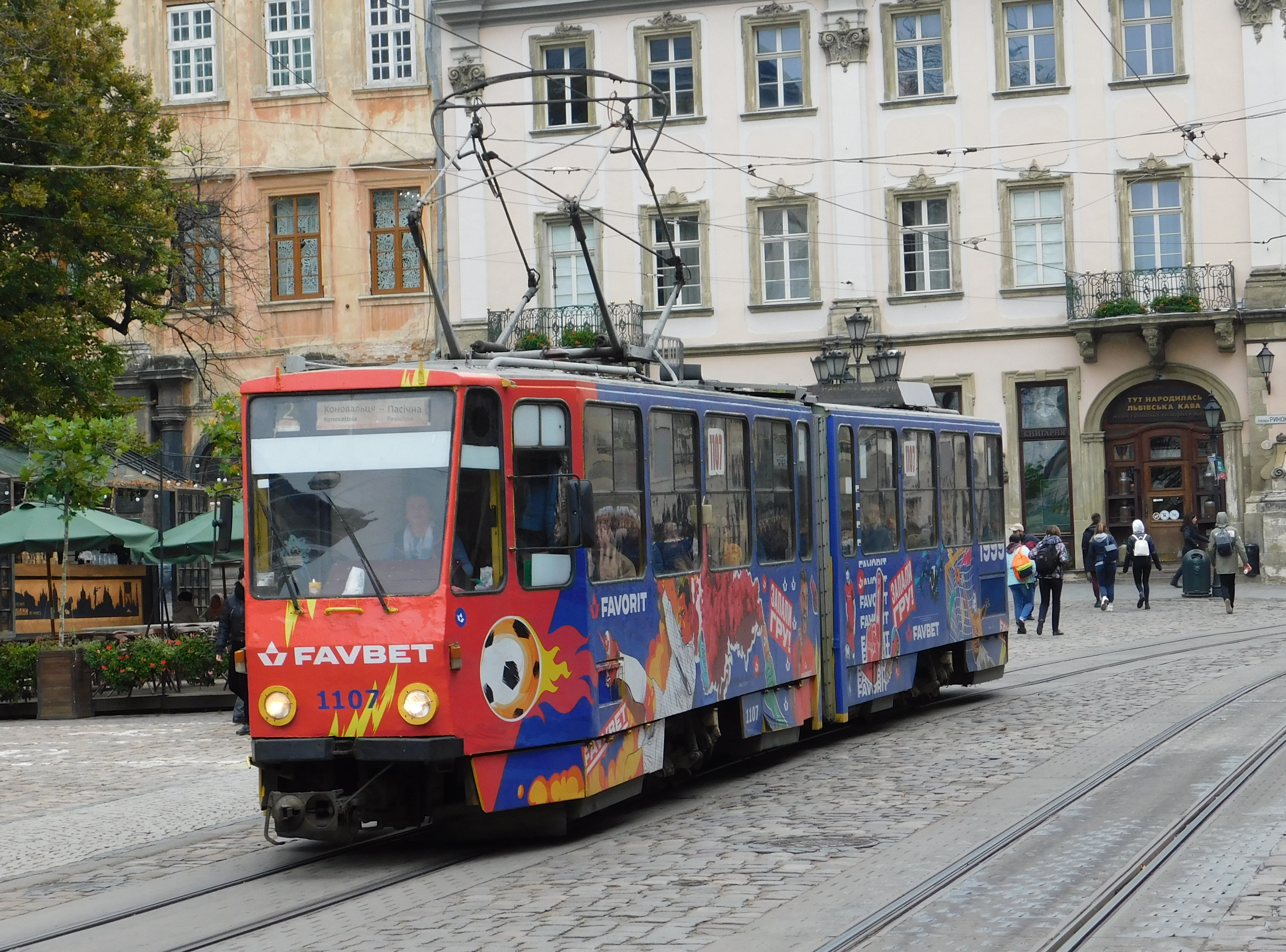
- KT4SU in Lviv
- Manufacturer: ČKD Tatra
- Constructed: 1972–97
- Number built: 1,747
- Capacity: 26–38 (Seated); 105–168 (Standing)

Specifications
- Train length: 18,100 mm (59 ft 4 5/8 in)
- Width: 2,200 mm (7 ft 2 5/8 in)
- Height: 3,100 mm (10 ft 2 in)
- Doors: 4
- Articulated sections: 1
- Maximum speed: 65 km/h (40 mph)
- Weight: 19.9 tonnes (19.6 long tons; 21.9 short tons)
- Traction motors: 4 x 40 kW (54 hp)
- Current collection: Pantograph
- Bogies: 2
- Track gauge: 1,435 mm (4 ft 8 1/2 in) standard gauge, 1,000 mm (3 ft 3 3/8 in) metre gauge

The Tatra KT4 (KT stands for kloubová tramvaj, lit. 'articulated tram') is a short-articulated tram with four-axles developed by the Czech firm ČKD Tatra. The first pre-production vehicles entered service in Potsdam in 1975, with the first production vehicles in 1977. A total of 1,747 units were built, with initial deliveries to East Germany (GDR) and later to the Soviet Union (USSR) and SFR Yugoslavia. KT4 variants were built for both standard gauge and metre gauge tramways. Production of the KT4 tramcar was halted in 1991 due to worldwide economic and political changes at the time. Production was briefly resumed in 1997 to construct the last 20 units for Belgrade, Serbia.

Cab ride in Tatra KT4D

Since the start of the 1990s, many of the earliest production tramcars have gone through extensive refurbishment and rebuilding, including the replacement of folding doors and the installation of low-floor center sections.

The design of the tram, being without a bogie over the joint necessitates a scissor joint connecting both bogies such that the center of mass does not shift catastrophically, especially when turning.

== History ==
The KT4 was originally designed to demands set out by the needs of the GDR, who found bogie cars too expensive and needed a solution to their aging fleet of two-axle vehicles. The first steps into the KT4s design were made when ČKD Tatra modified a six-axle K2 tramcar, to a four-axle suspended articulation formation which later presented itself in the KT4. The KT4 has identical pedal control systems and bogies to the Tatra T3 bogie tramcar. As production continued, the design was improved, noted particularly in 1983 with the addition of thyristor control type TV3. The type is called KT4t.

== Variations ==
Variations of the KT4 exist, though they are generally subtle and focused around seat layout and pantograph type.

- KT4D – German model
- KT4Dt – German model with TV3 thyristor
- KT4SU – Soviet Union model
- KT4YU – Yugoslav model

Note that there is no such thing as a KT4K. KT4 used in North Korea were not built by Tatra, instead built by the Shenyeng Passenger Vehicle Factory and named differently.

=== KT4D ===
The KT4D model was delivered to the following GDR cities:

City	Delivery years	Number delivered
Berlin	1976–88	574
Brandenburg	1979–83	16
Cottbus	1978–90	65
Erfurt	1976–90	156
Frankfurt (Oder)	1987–90	34
Gera	1978–90	60
Görlitz	1987–90	11
Gotha	1981–82	6
Leipzig	1976	8
Potsdam	1974–87	45
Plauen	1976–88	45
Zwickau	1987–88	22
TOTAL	1974–90	1,042

In 1984, Leipzig handed over their eight trams to Berlin. Since the early 2000s, the Tatra tramcars in the former GDR are being replaced and sold to other countries in Central and Eastern Europe.

==== Original KT4D ====
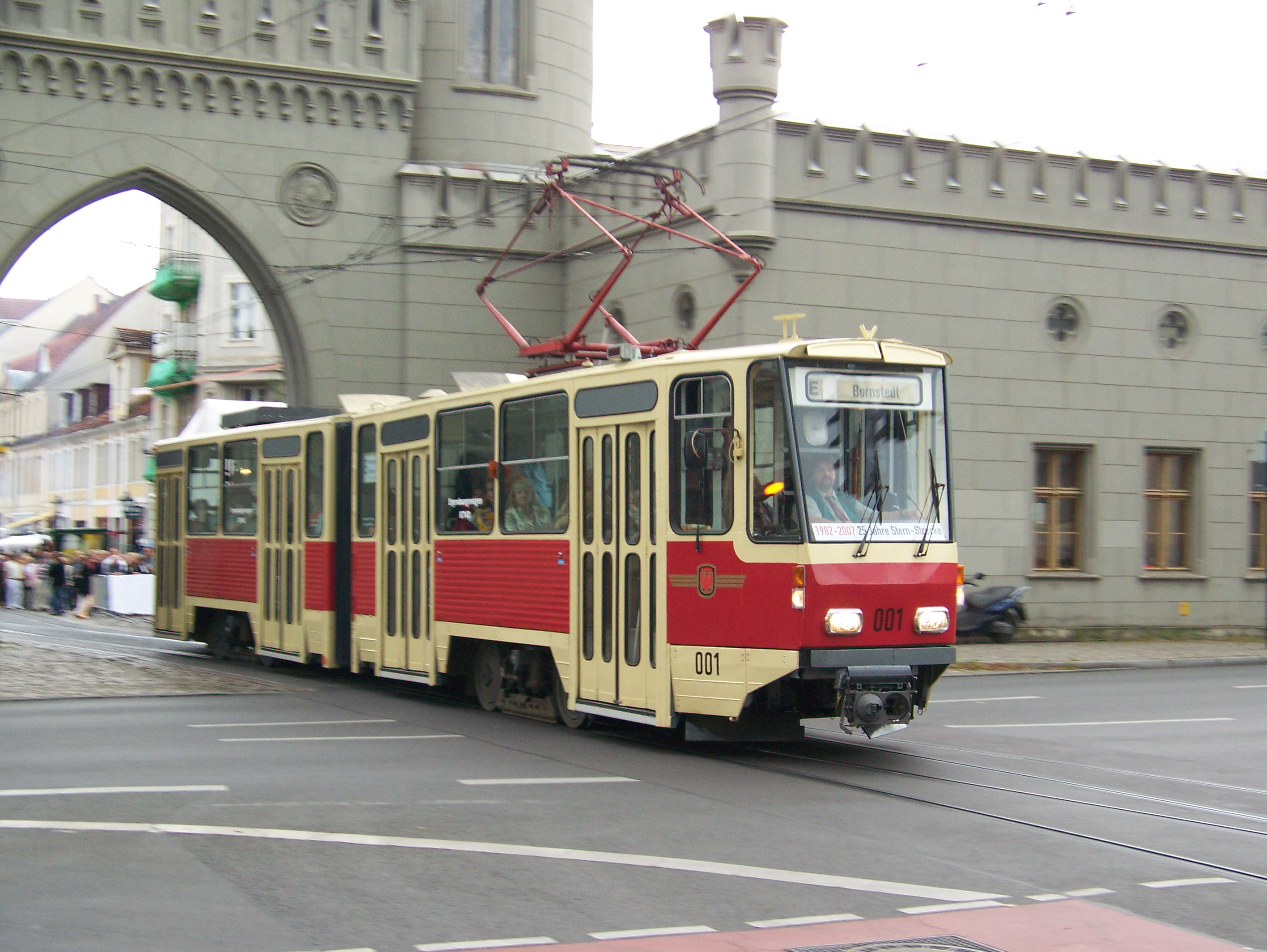
KT4D prototype in Potsdam

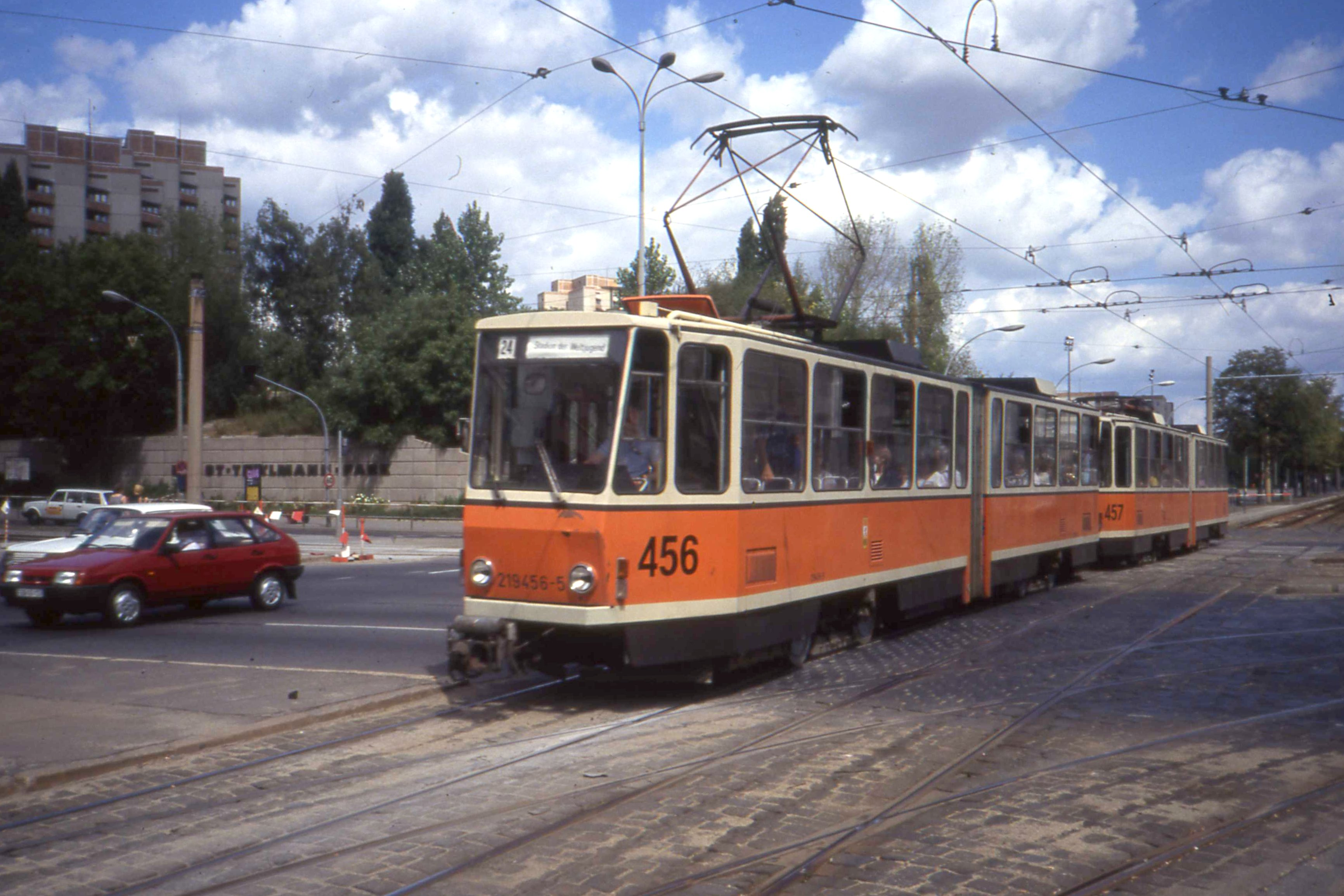
KT4D in Berlin

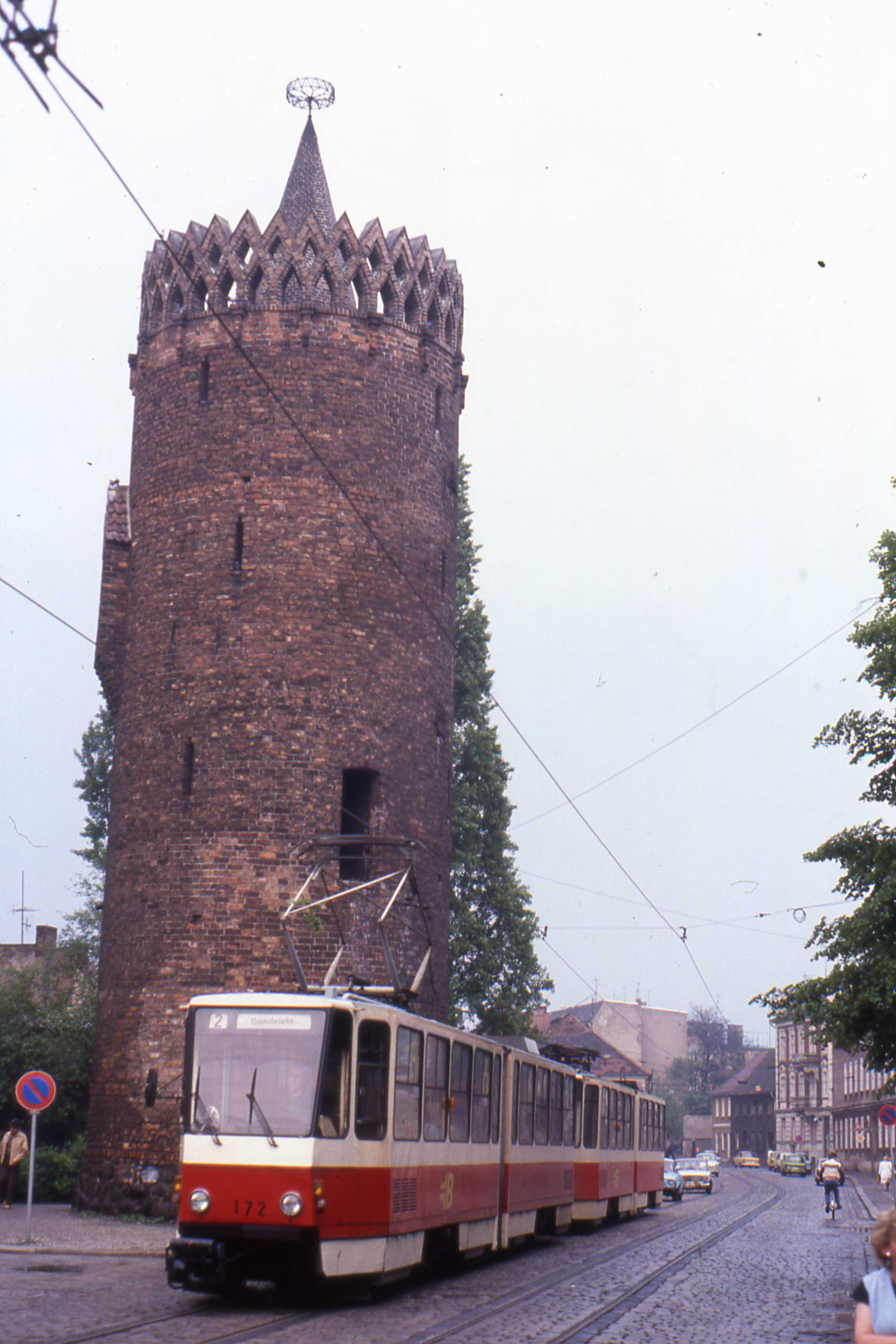
KT4D in Brandenburg/Havel

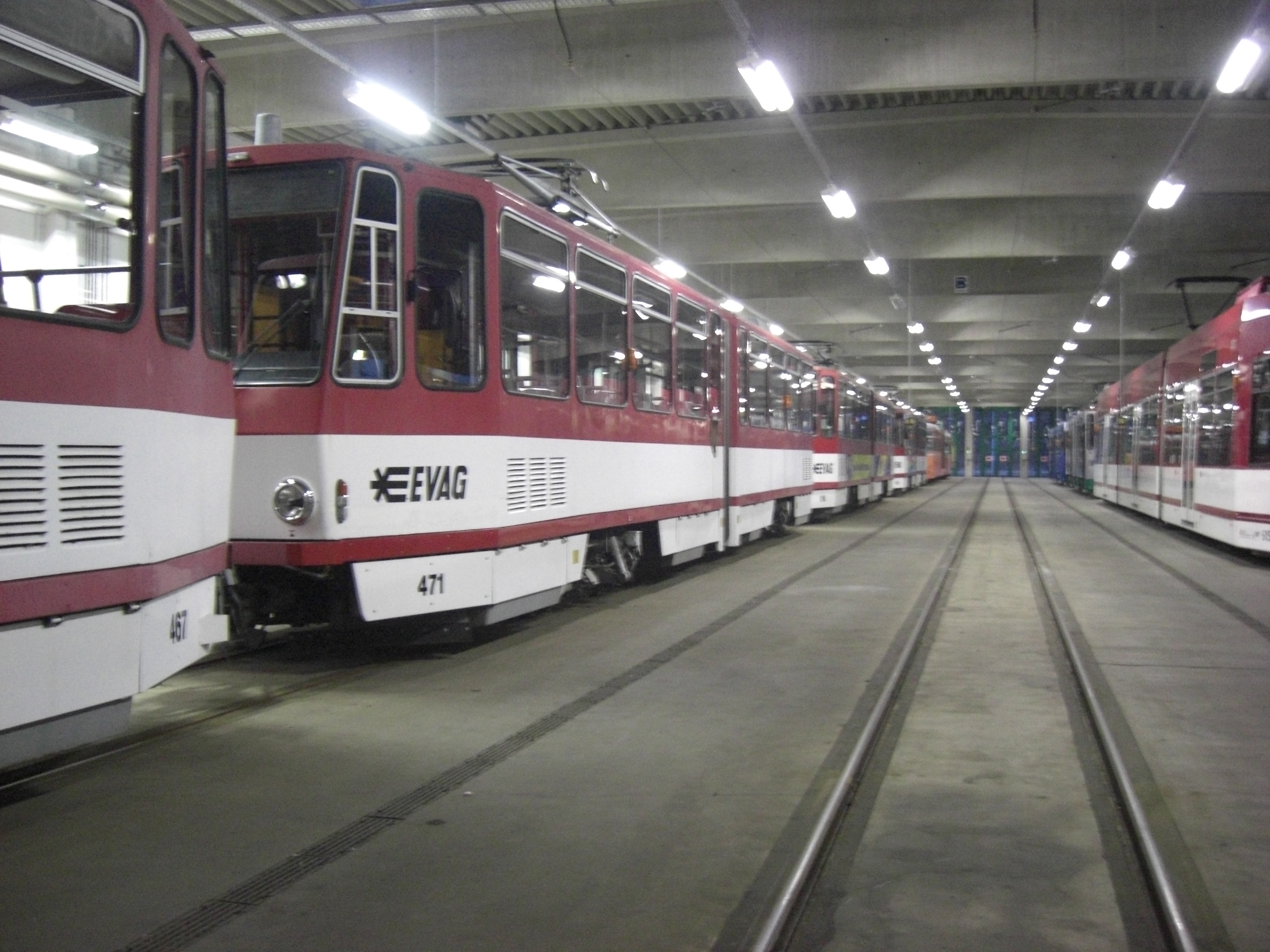
KT4D in Erfurt

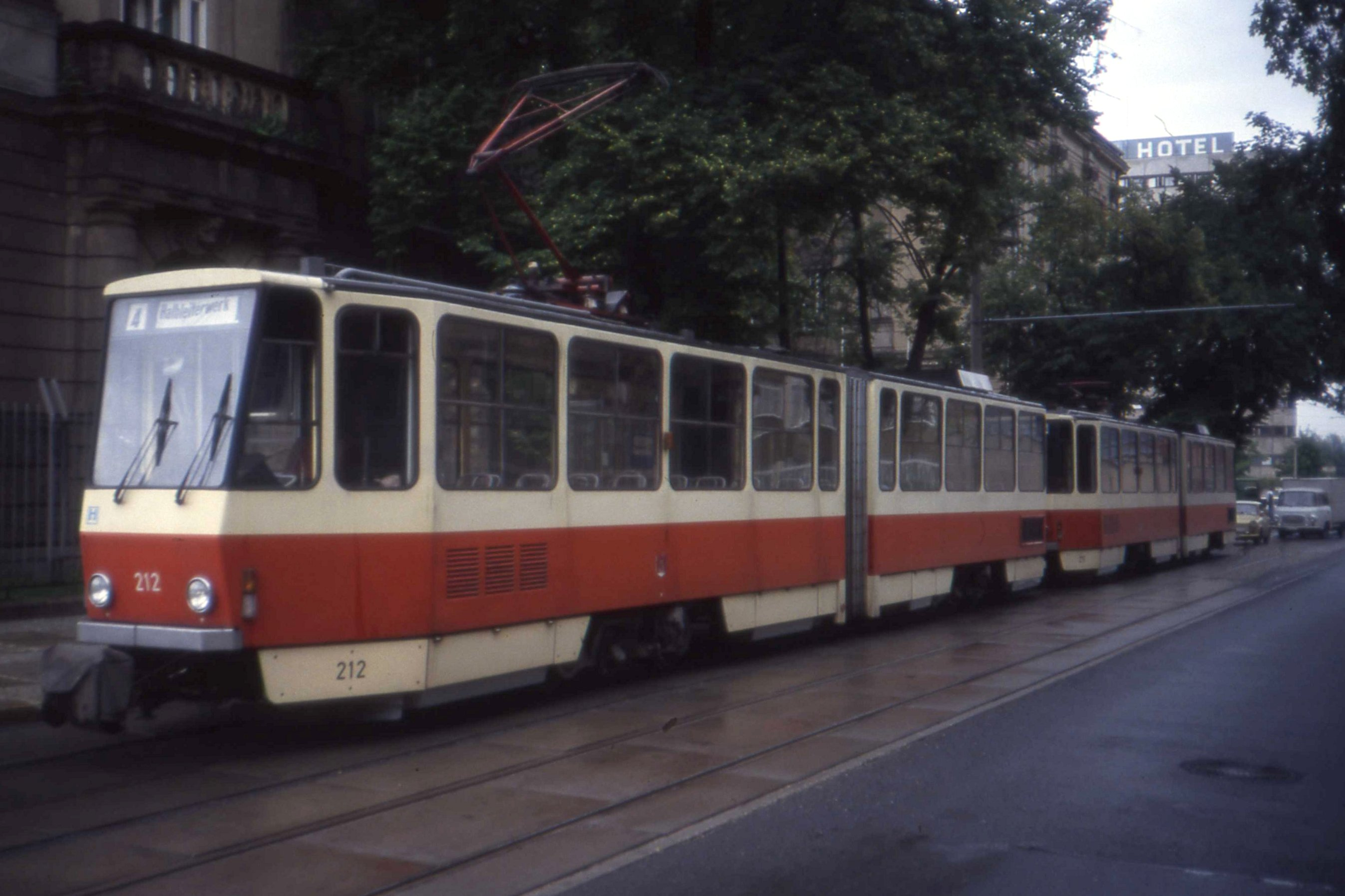
KT4D in Frankfurt (Oder)

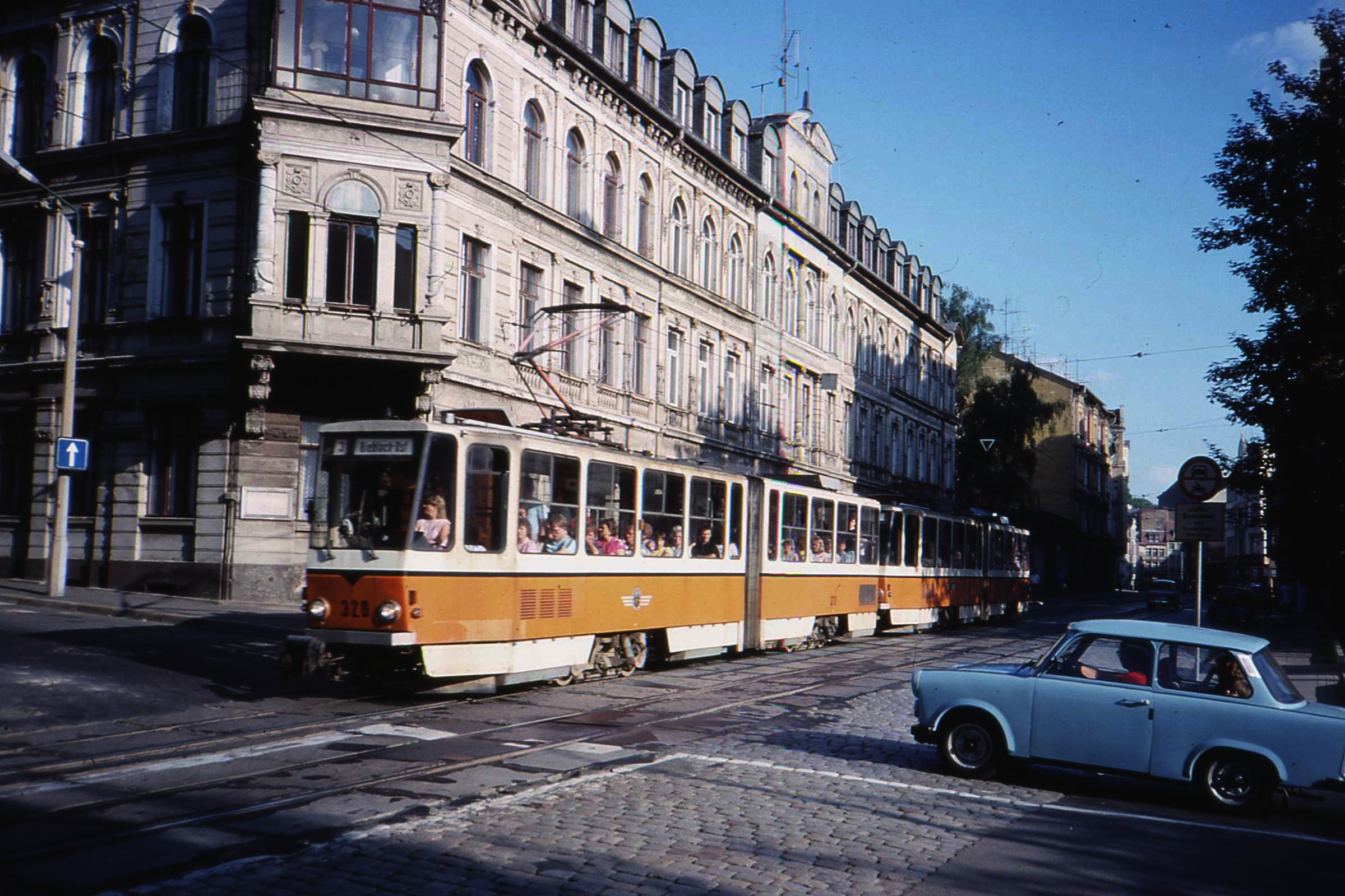
KT4D in Gera

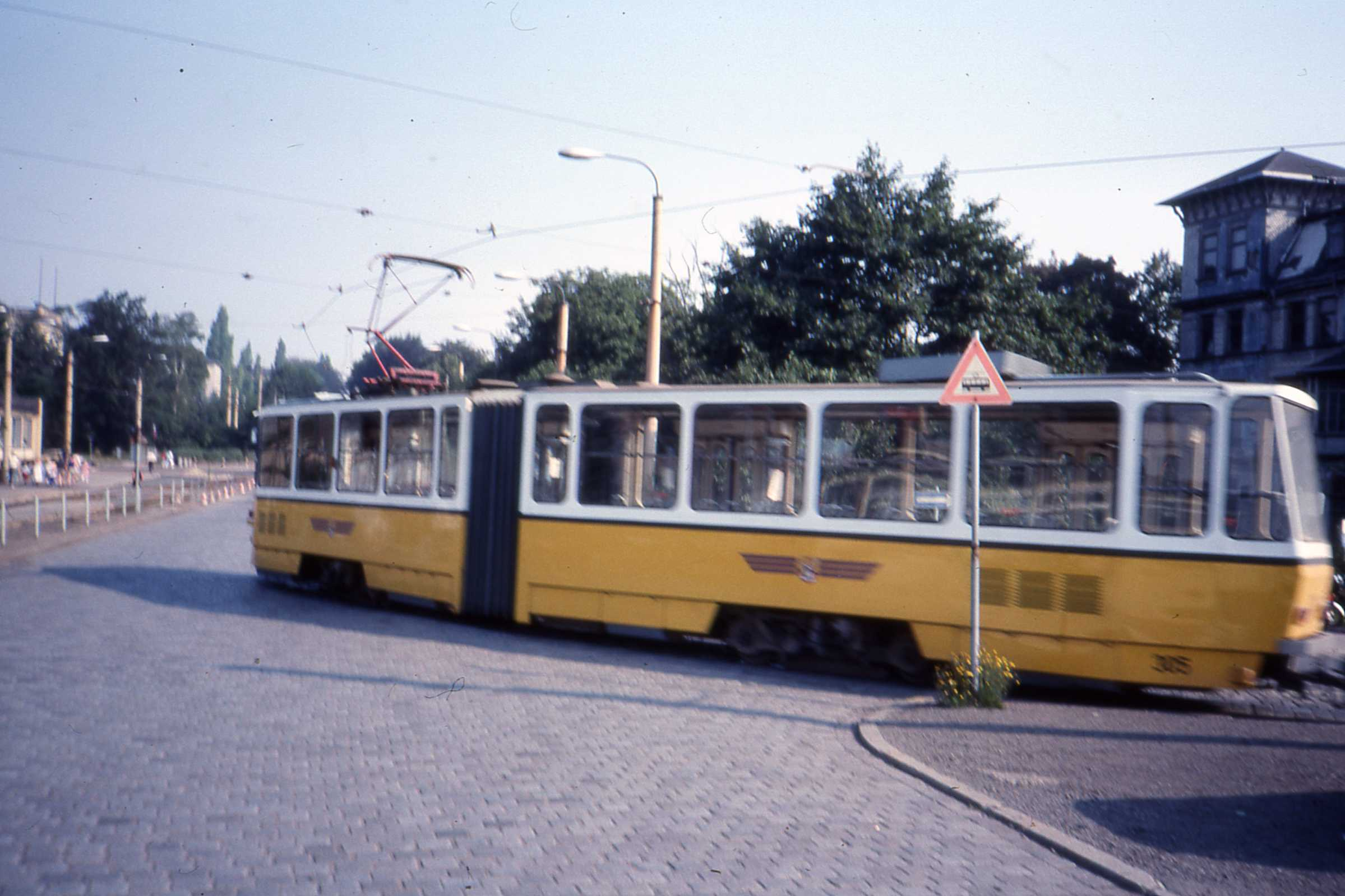
KT4D in Gotha

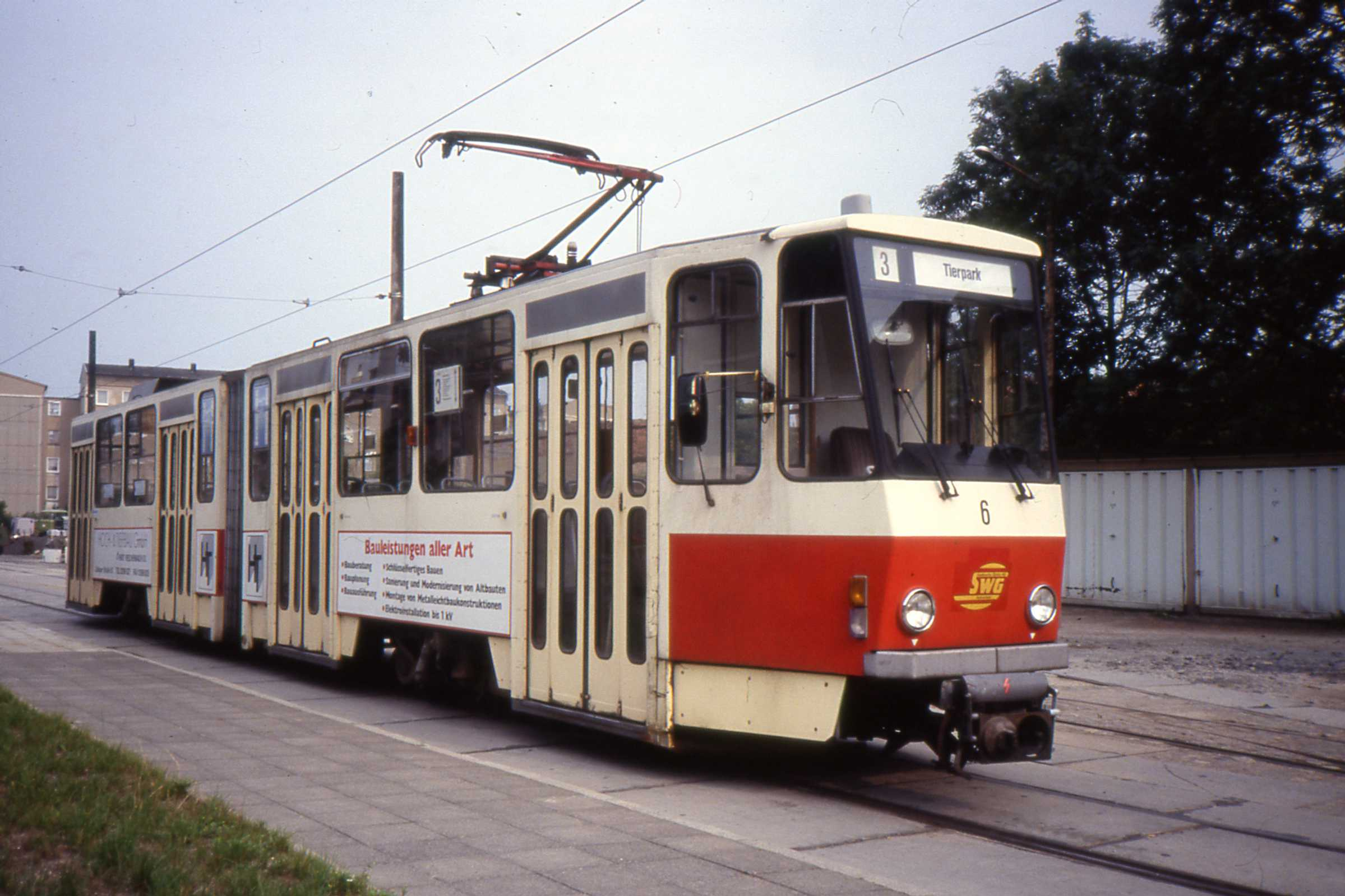
KT4D in Görlitz

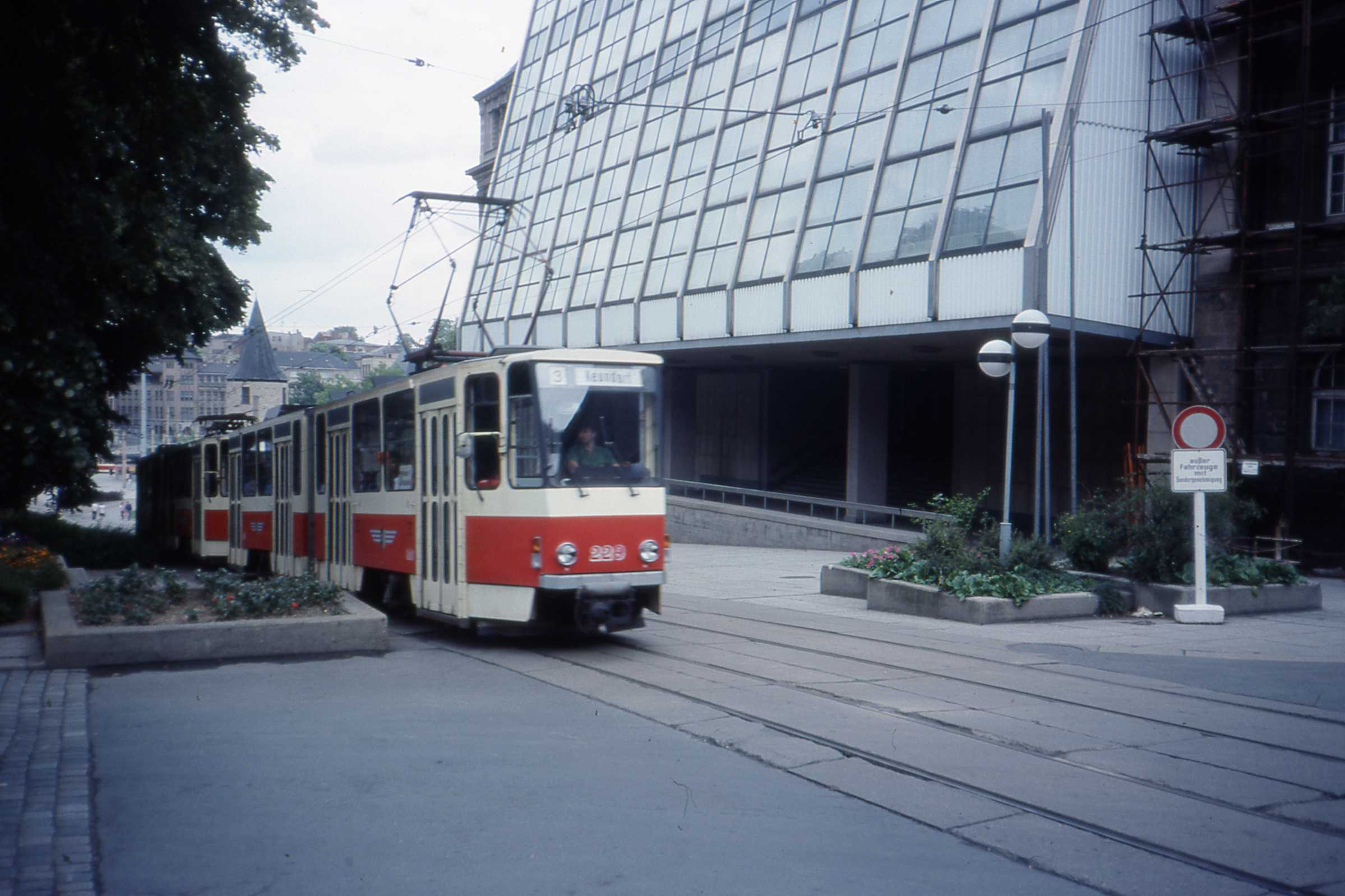
KT4D in Plauen

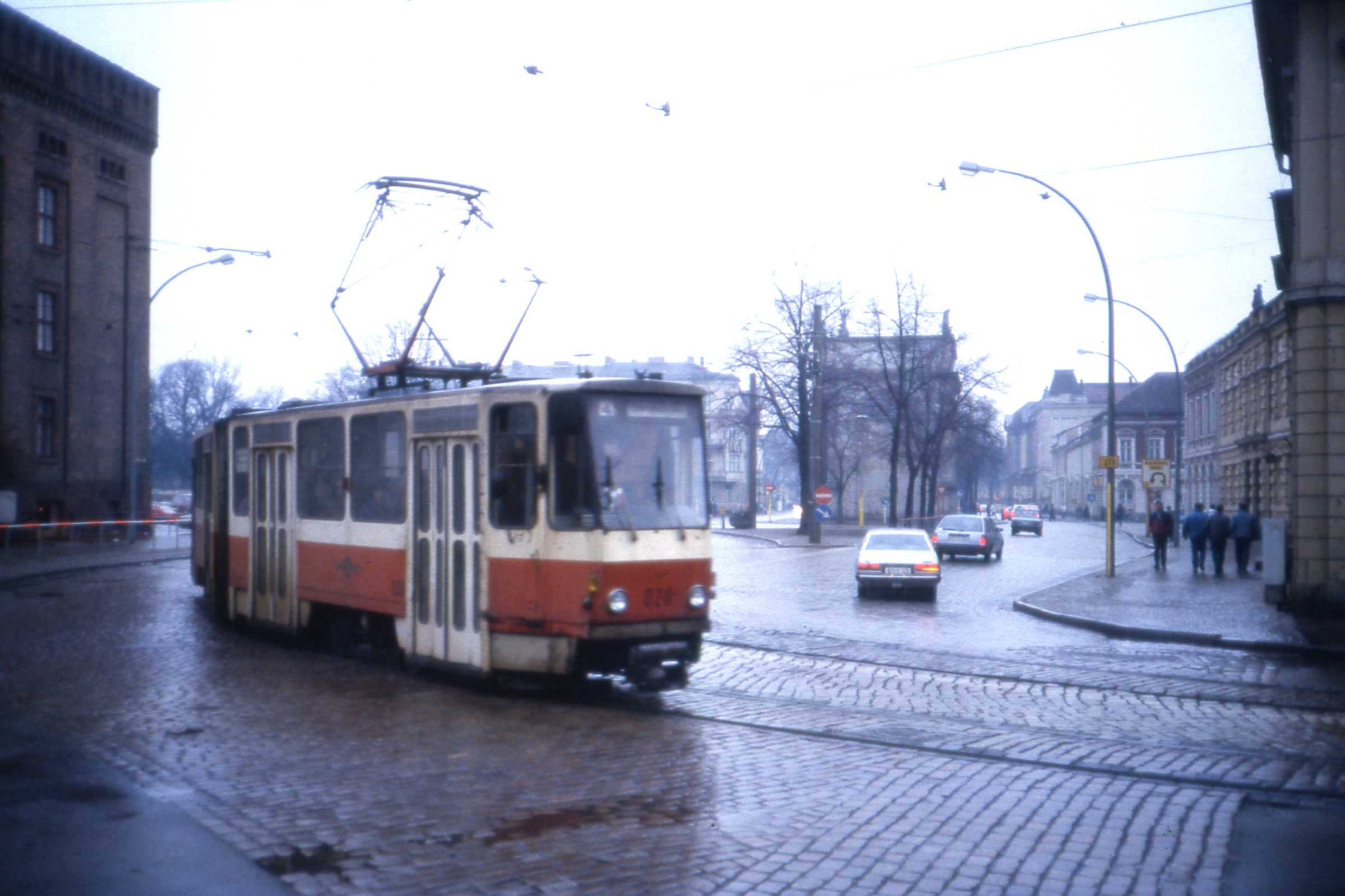
KT4D in Potsdam

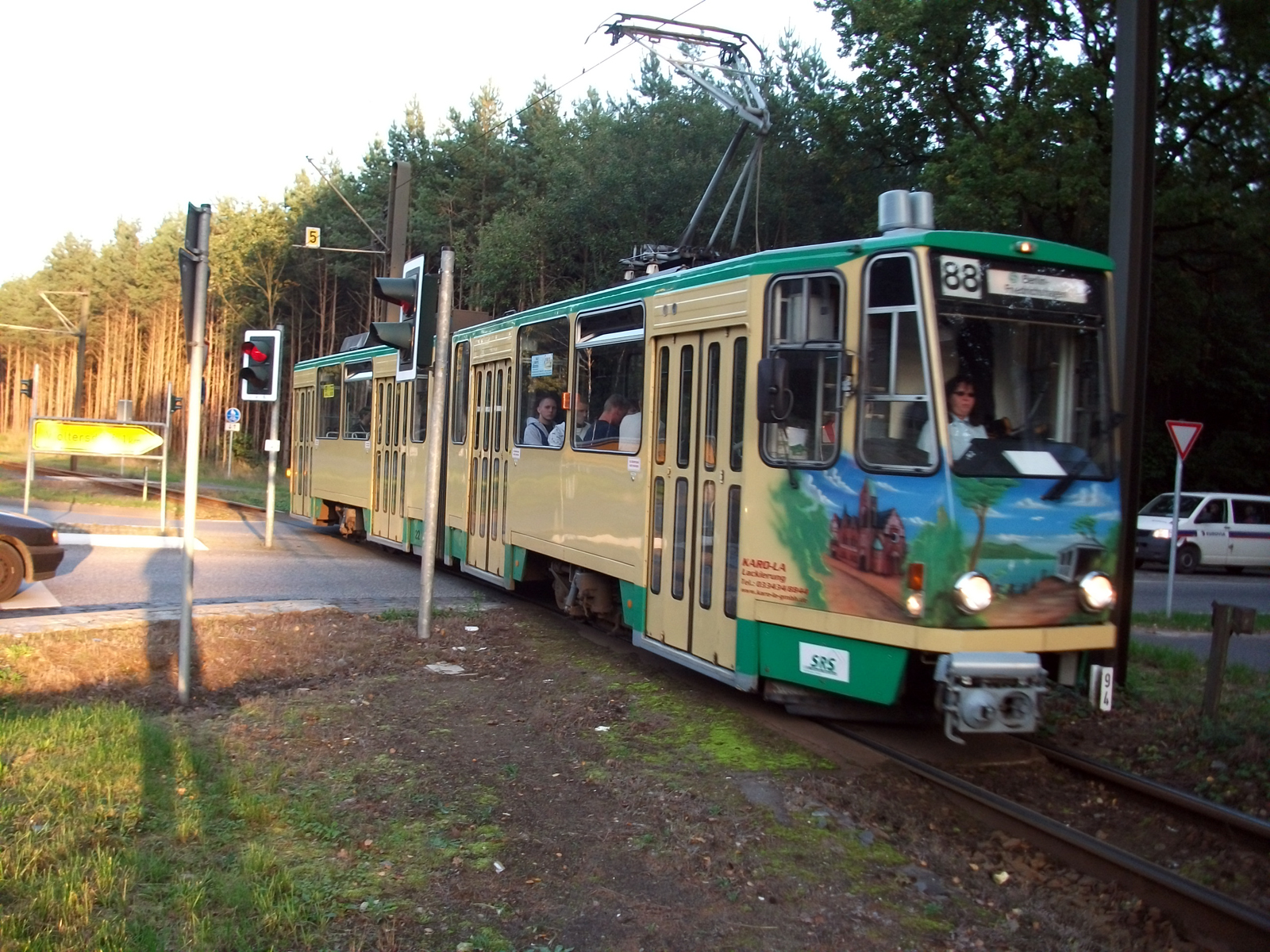
at SRS Tramways

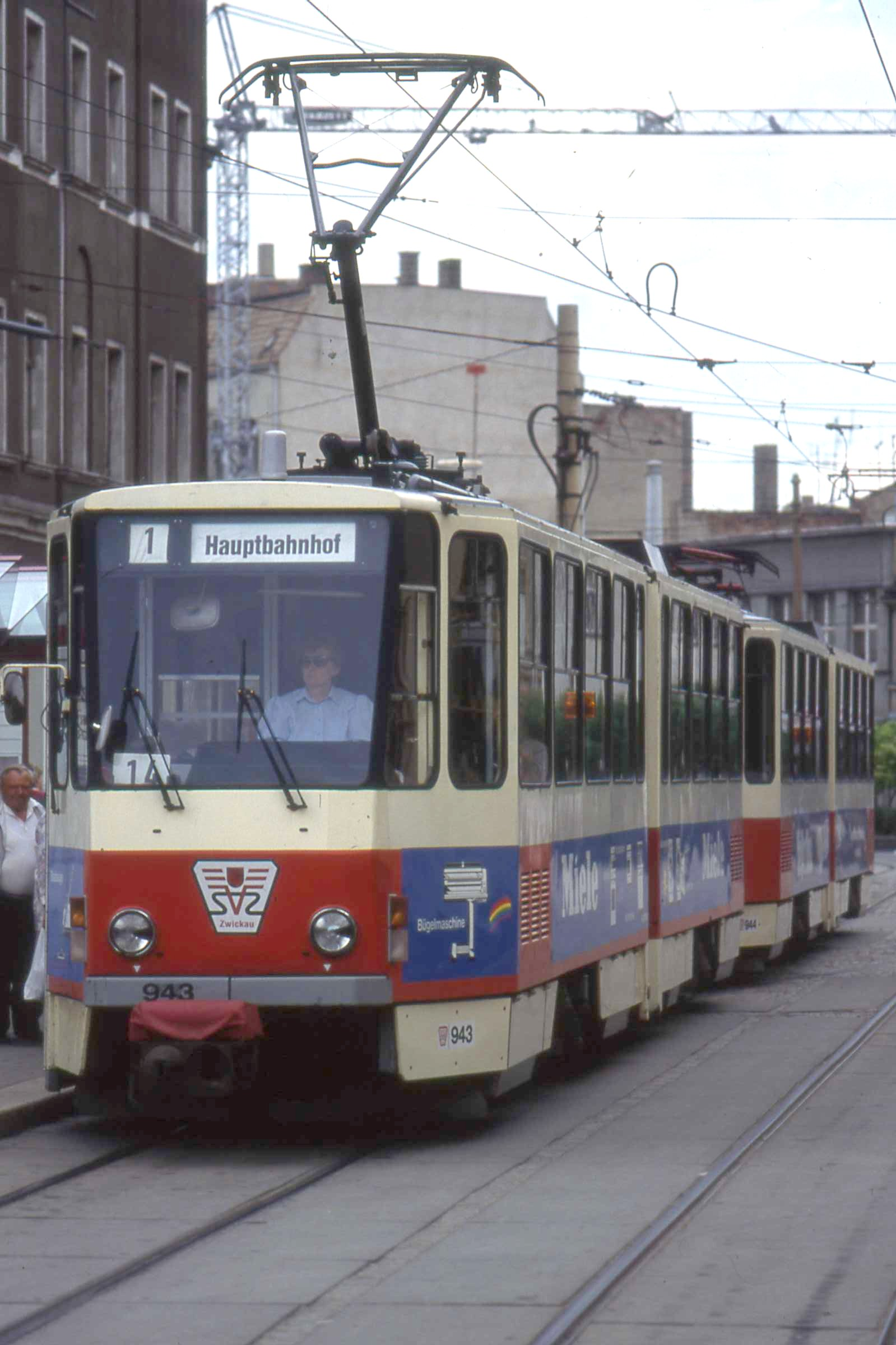
KT4D in Zwickau

==== Modernised KT4D ====
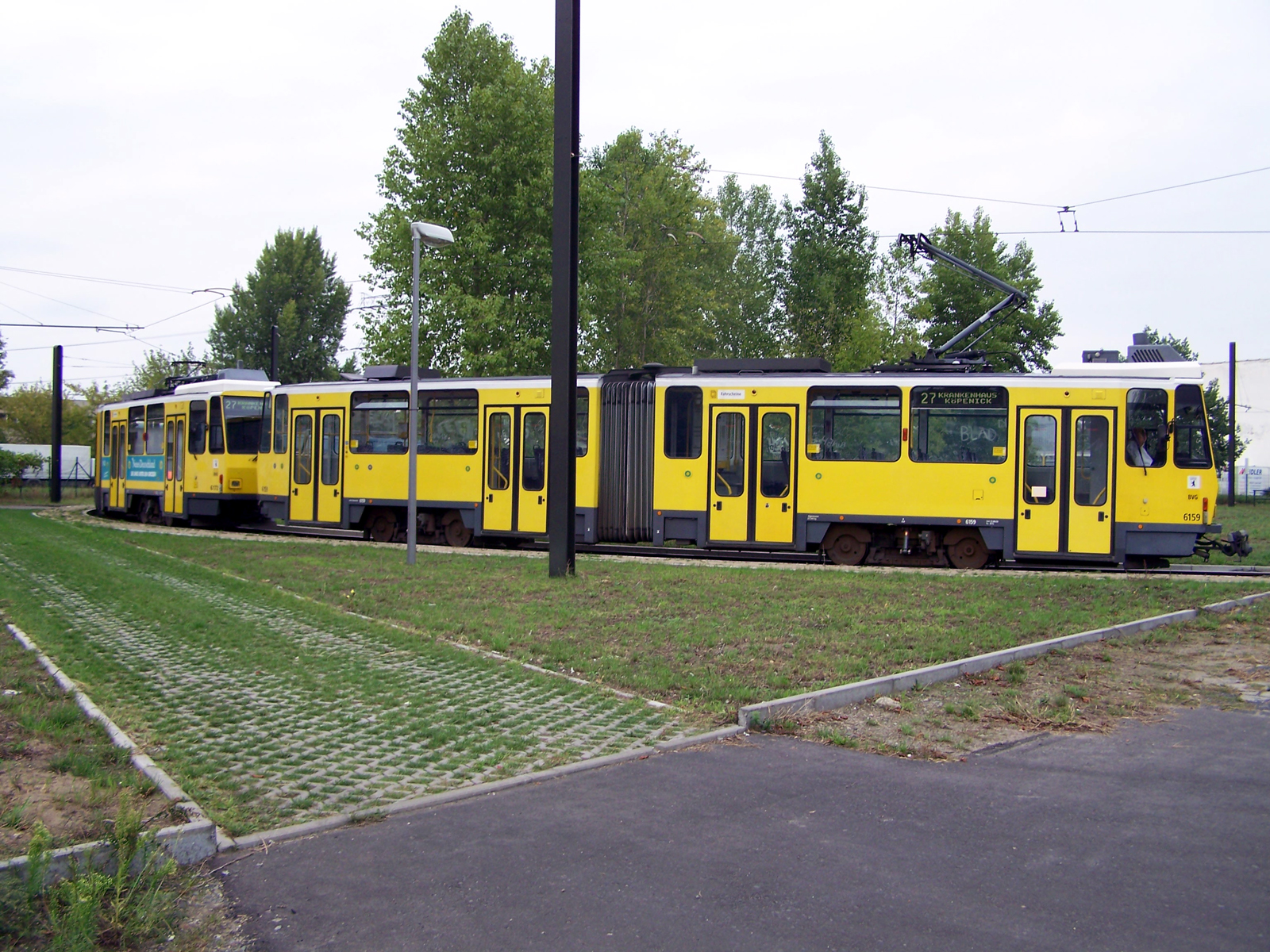
KT4Dm in Berlin

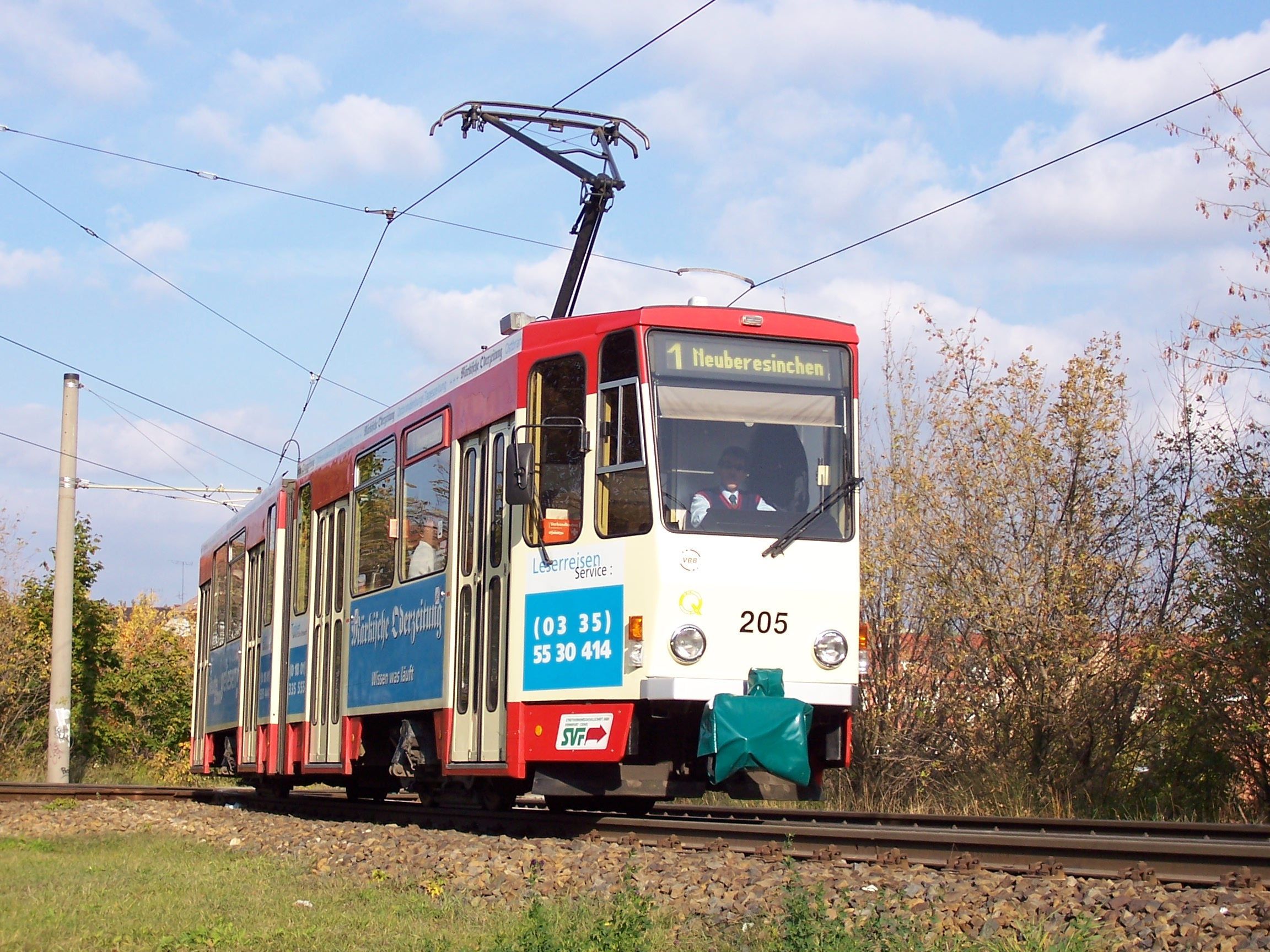
KT4Dm in Frankfurt/Oder

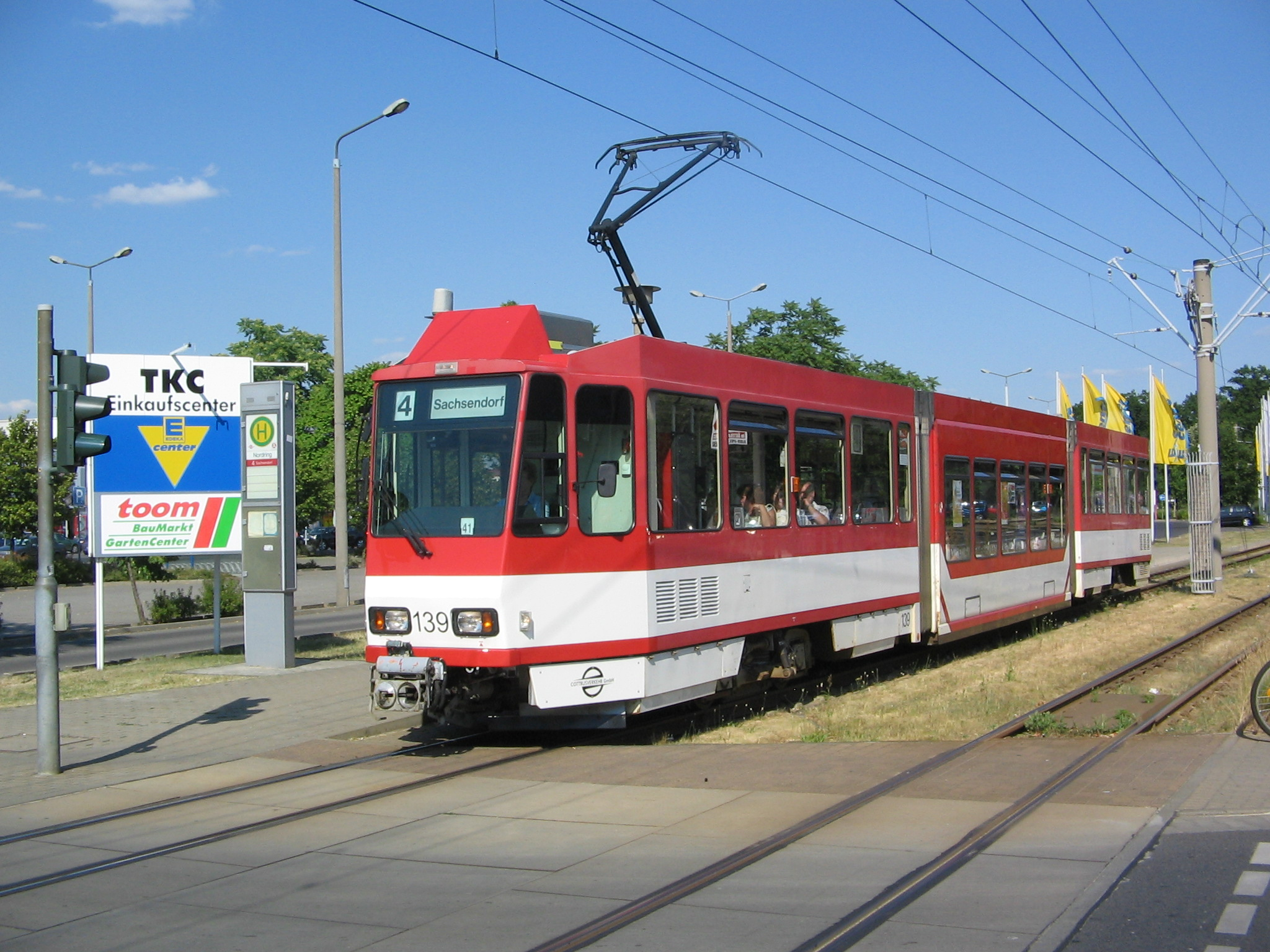
KTNF6 (KT4D rebuilt with a central low-floor segment) in Cottbus

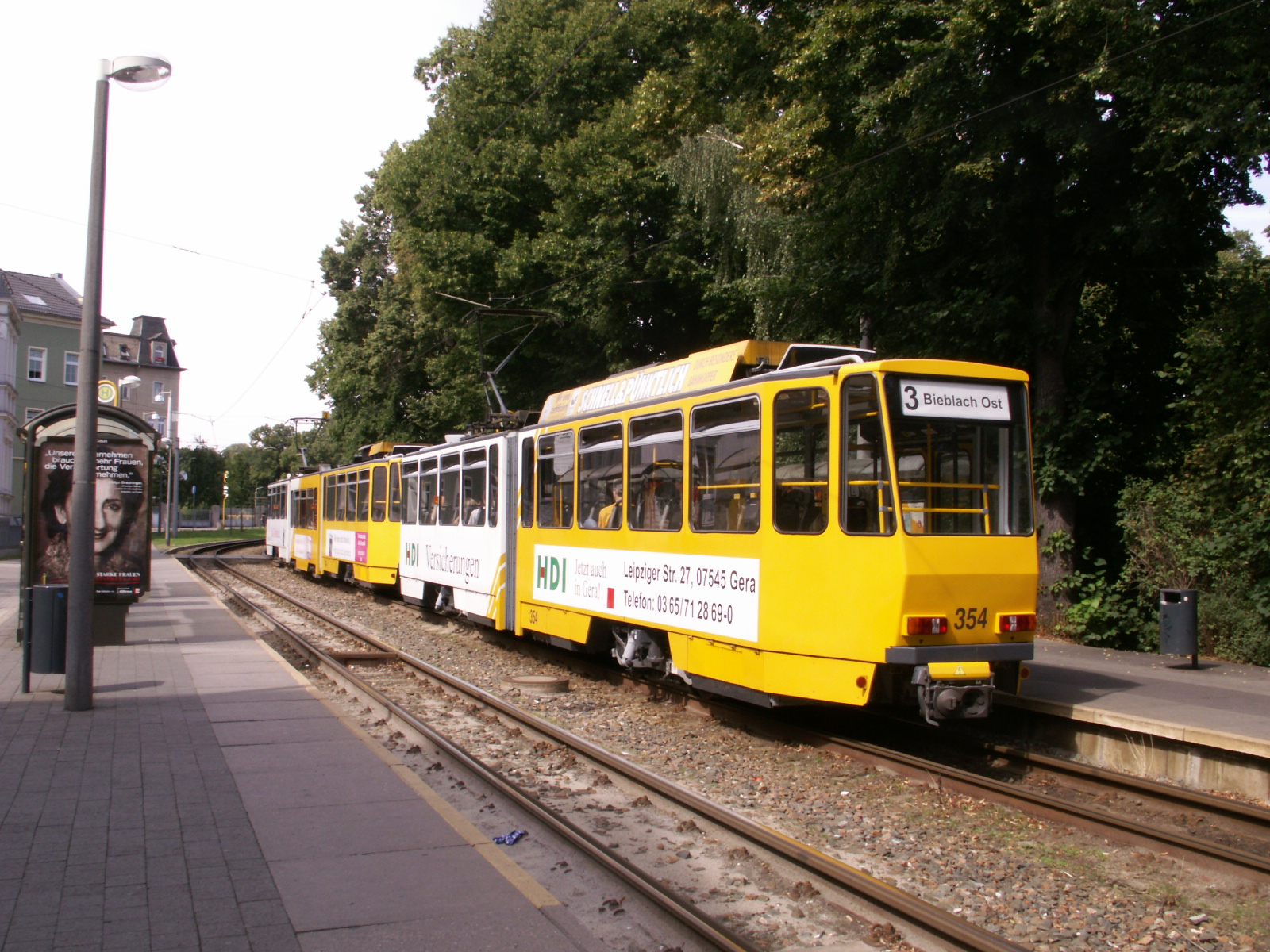
KTNF8 (another variant with central low-floor segment added) coupled with KT4Dm in Gera

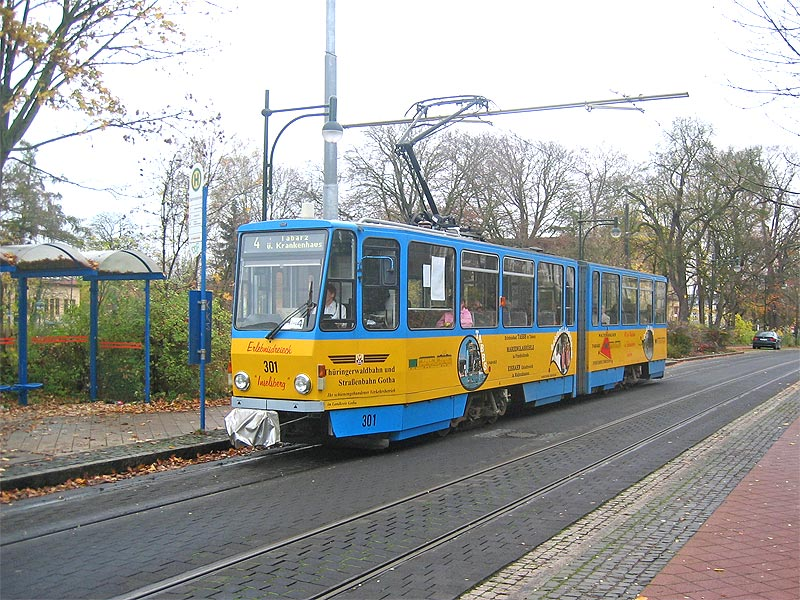
KT4D mod 301 in Gotha 2005

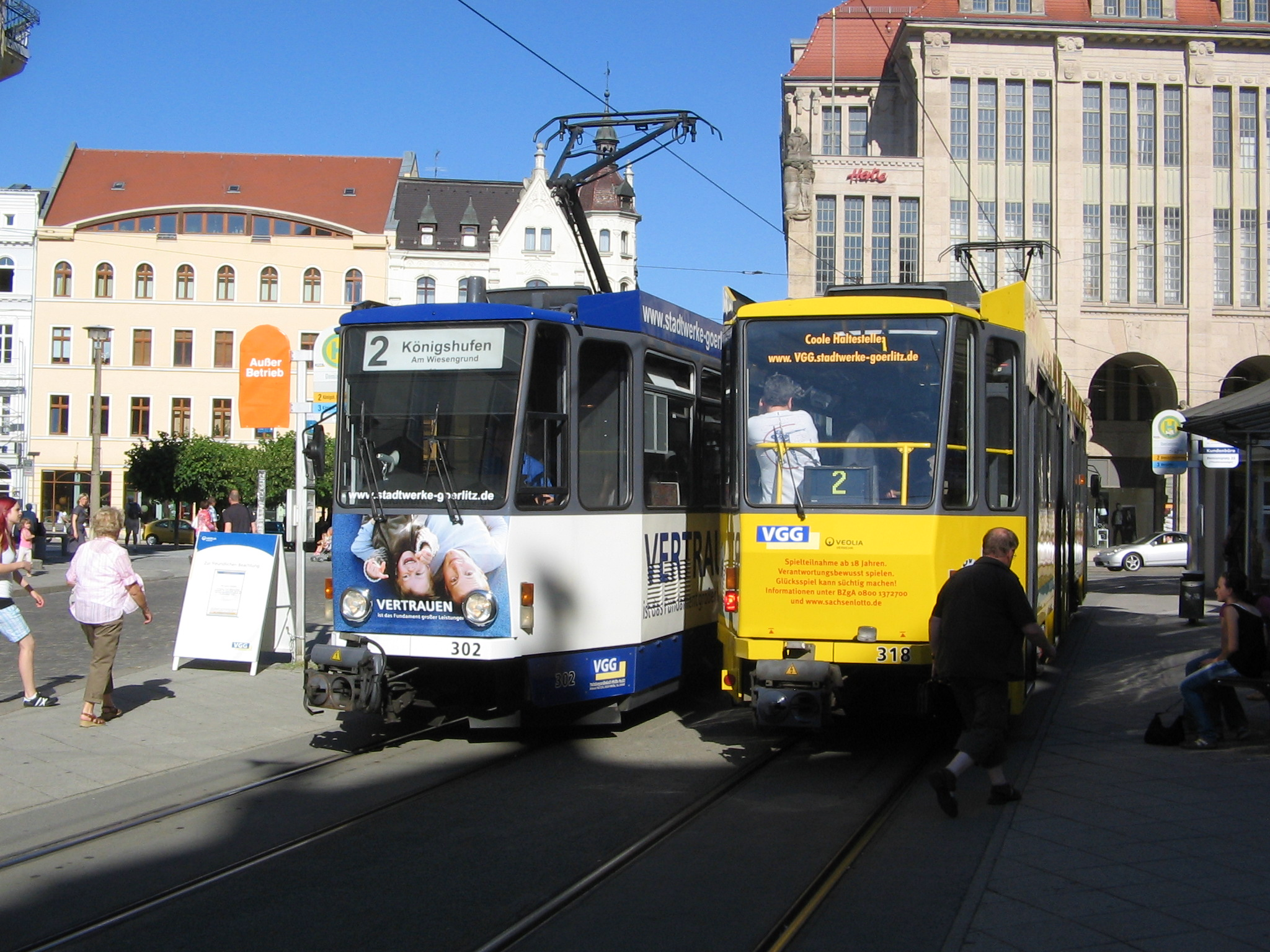
Both actual colors of KT4D in Görlitz

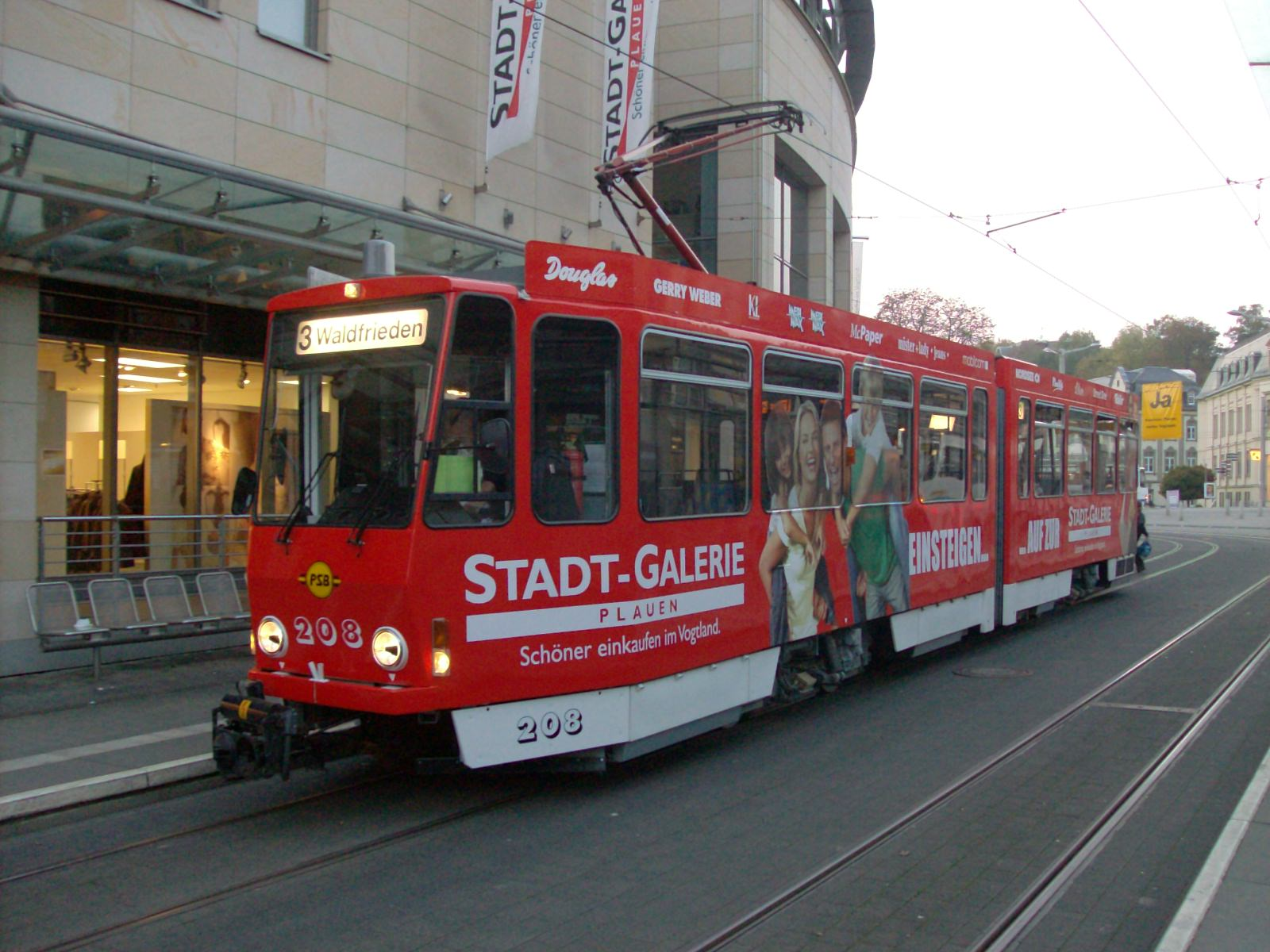
Modernised KT4D in Plauen

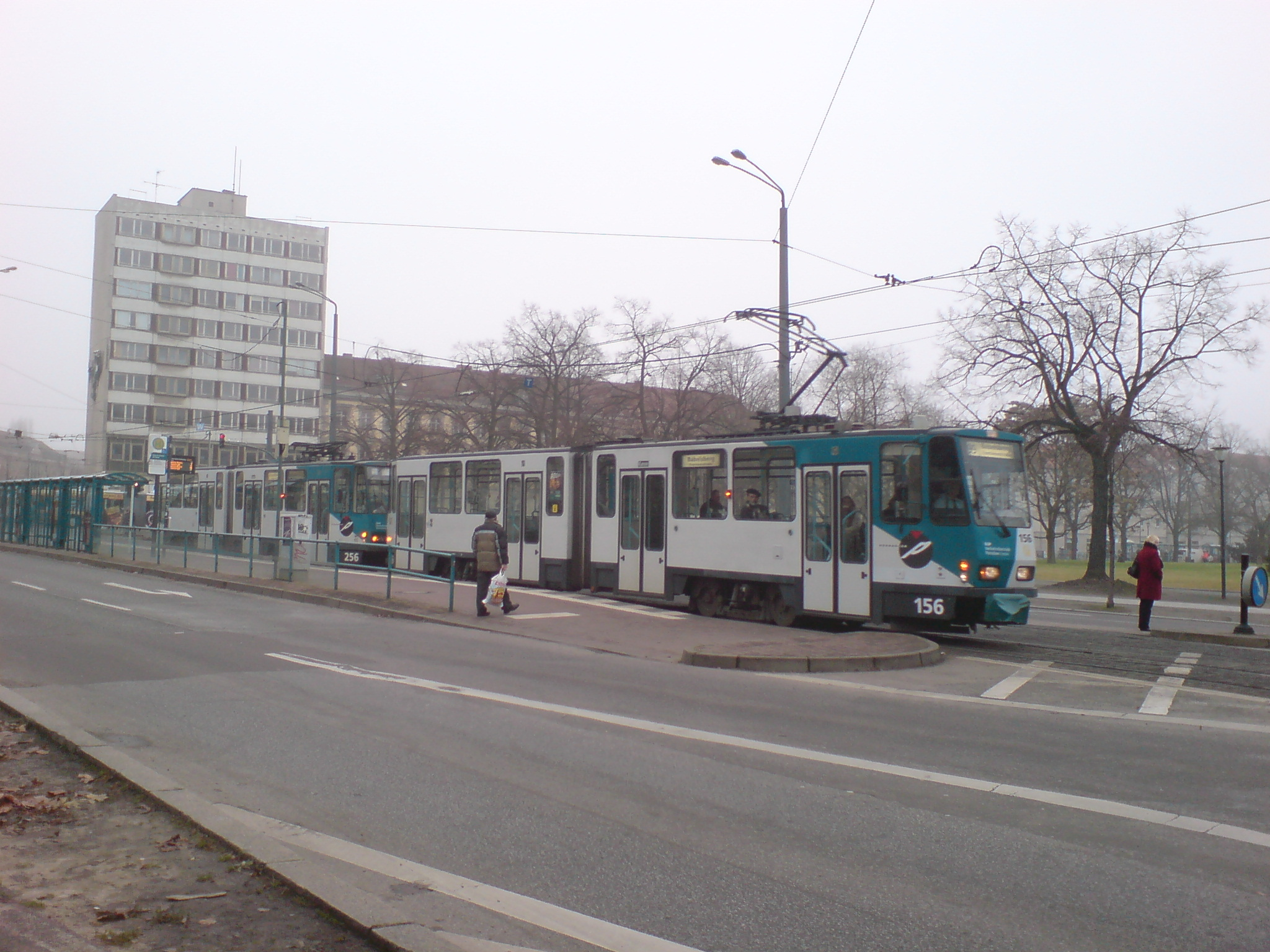
KT4Dm double in Potsdam

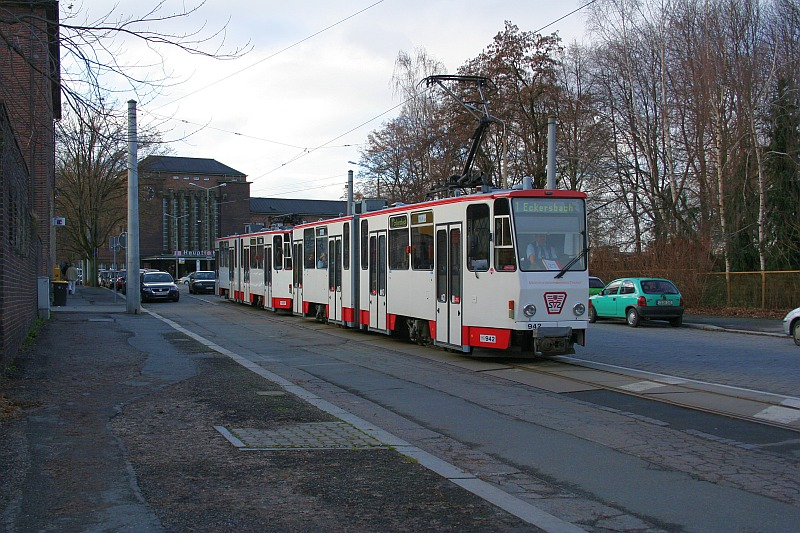
KT4DC in Zwickau

==== Sold KT4Ds ====
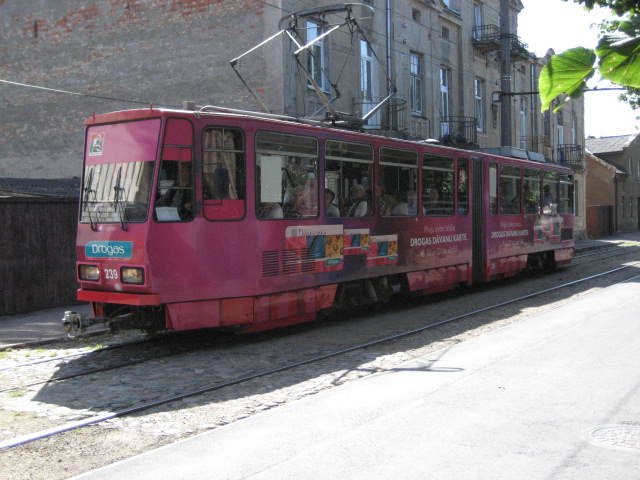
Former Gera KT4D 239 in Liepāja, Latvia

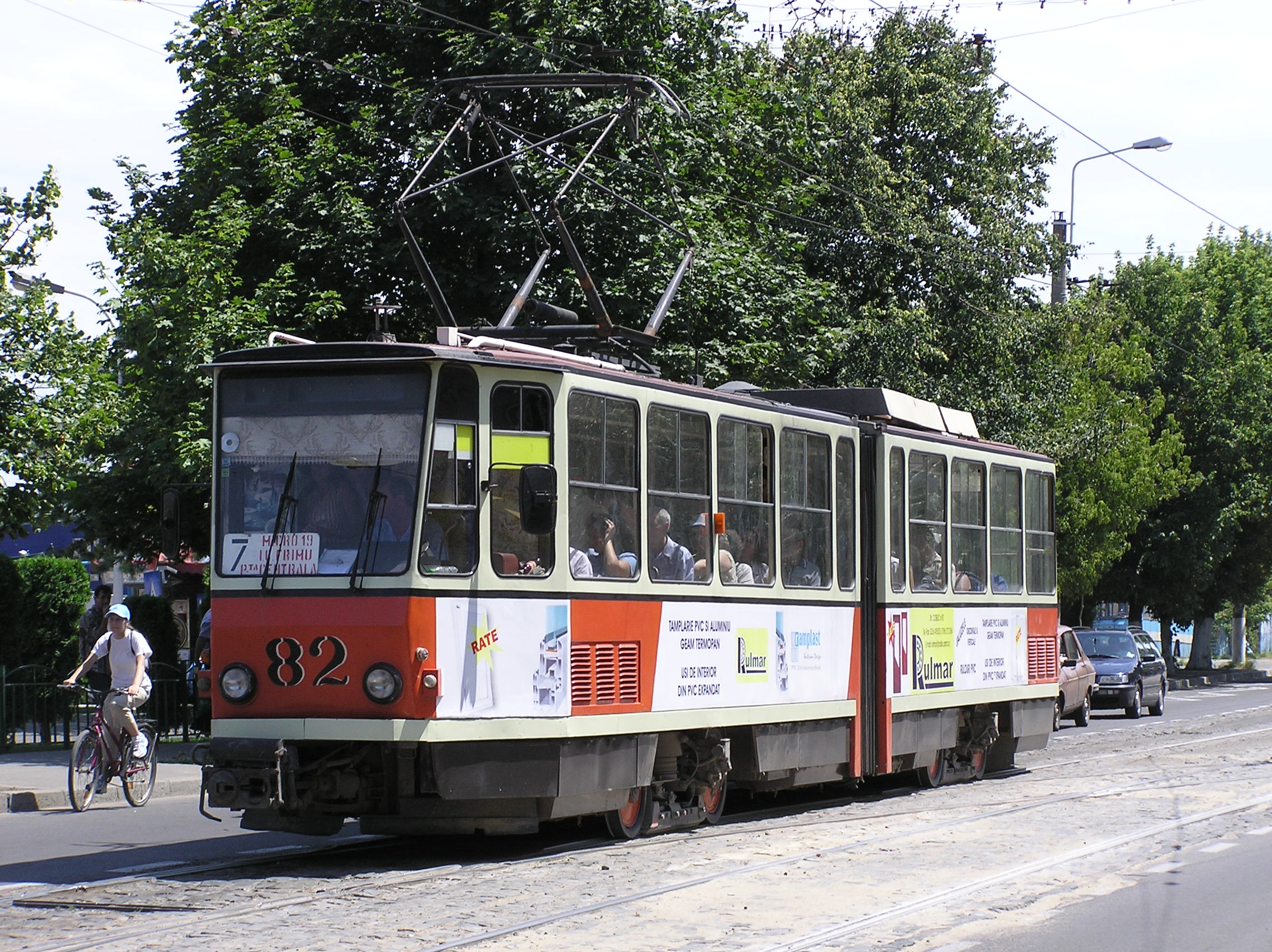
Former Berlin KT4D 82 in Galaţi, Romania

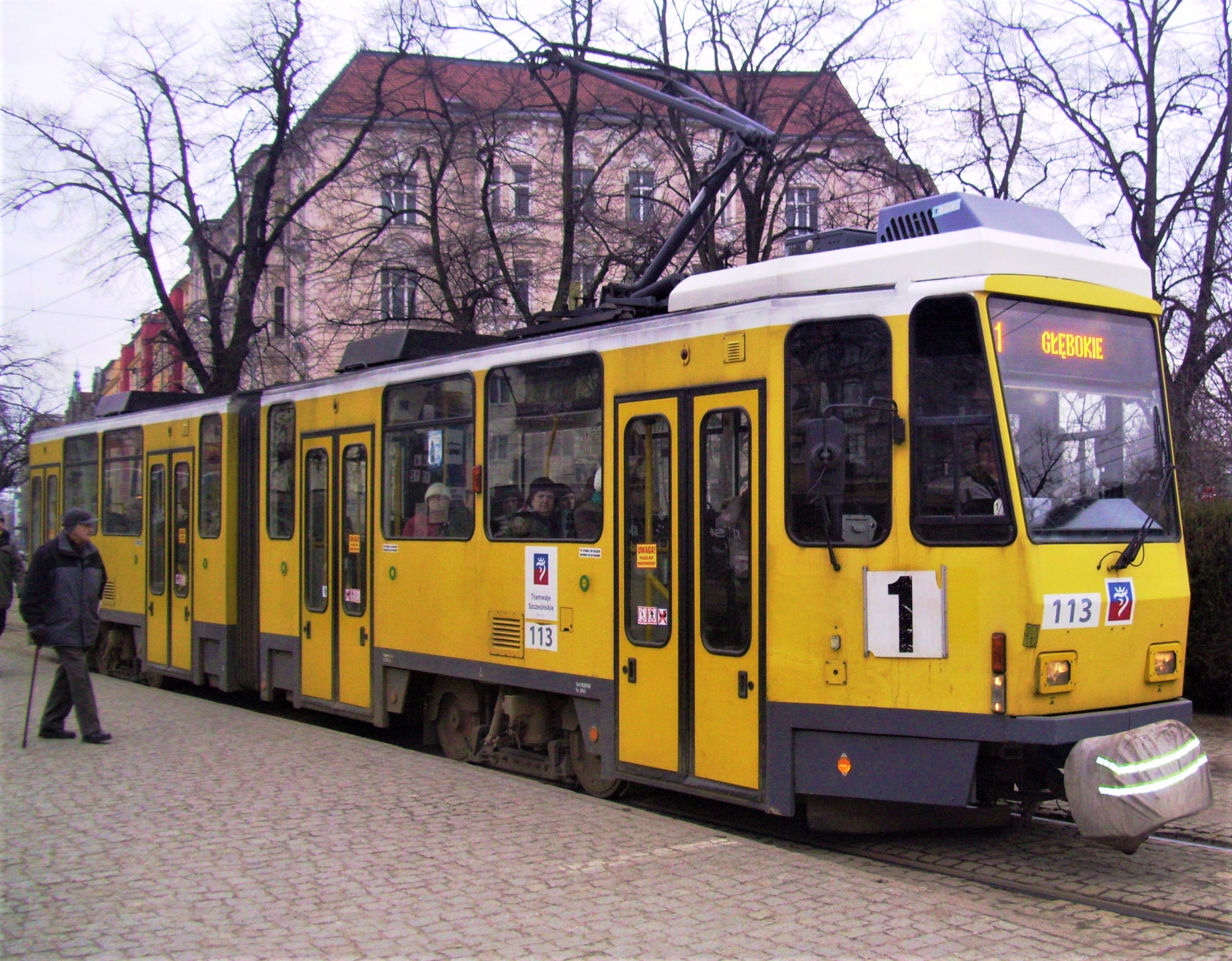
Former Berlin KT4Dm in Szczecin, Poland

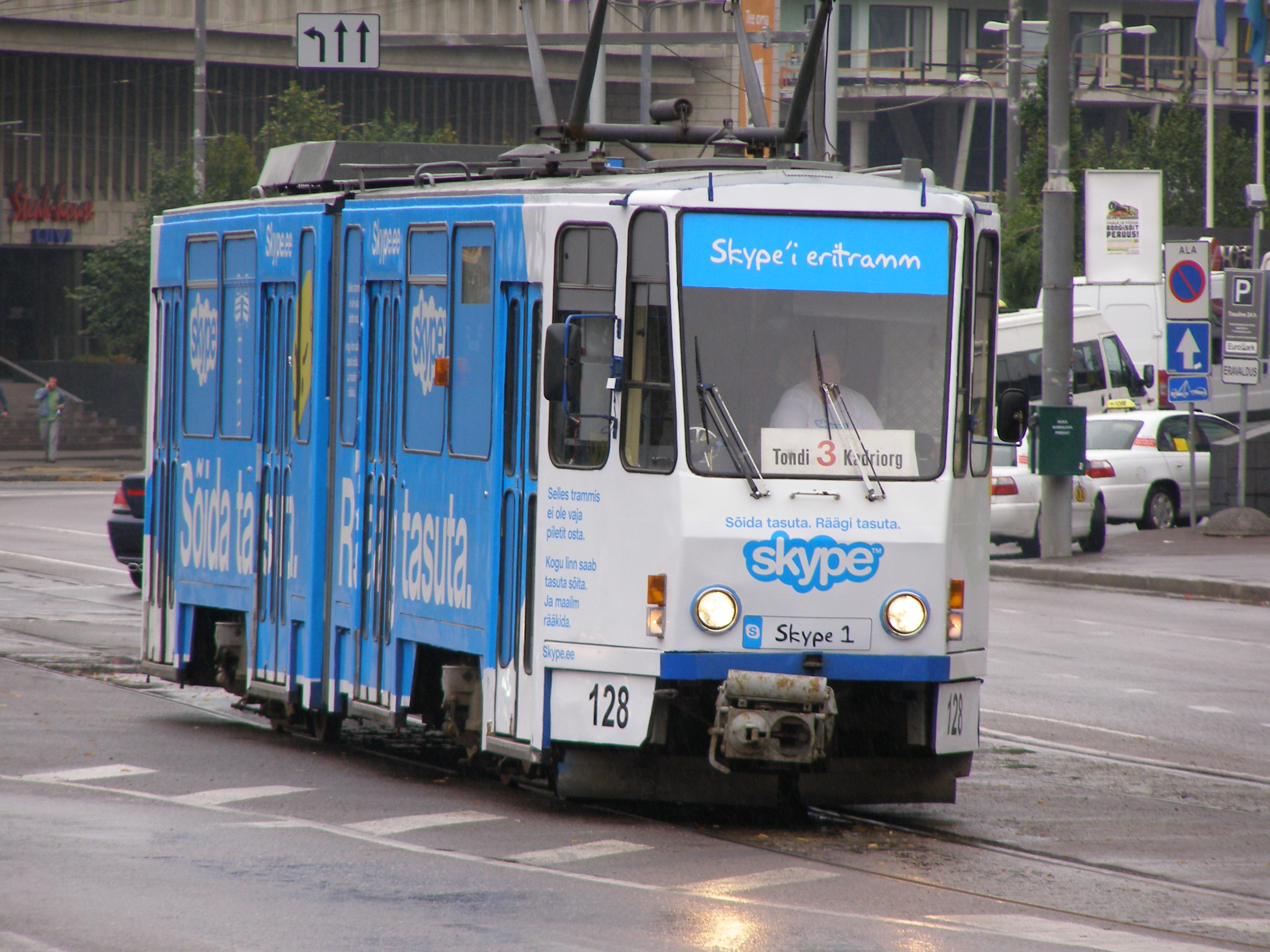
Former Cottbus KT4D in Tallinn, Estonia

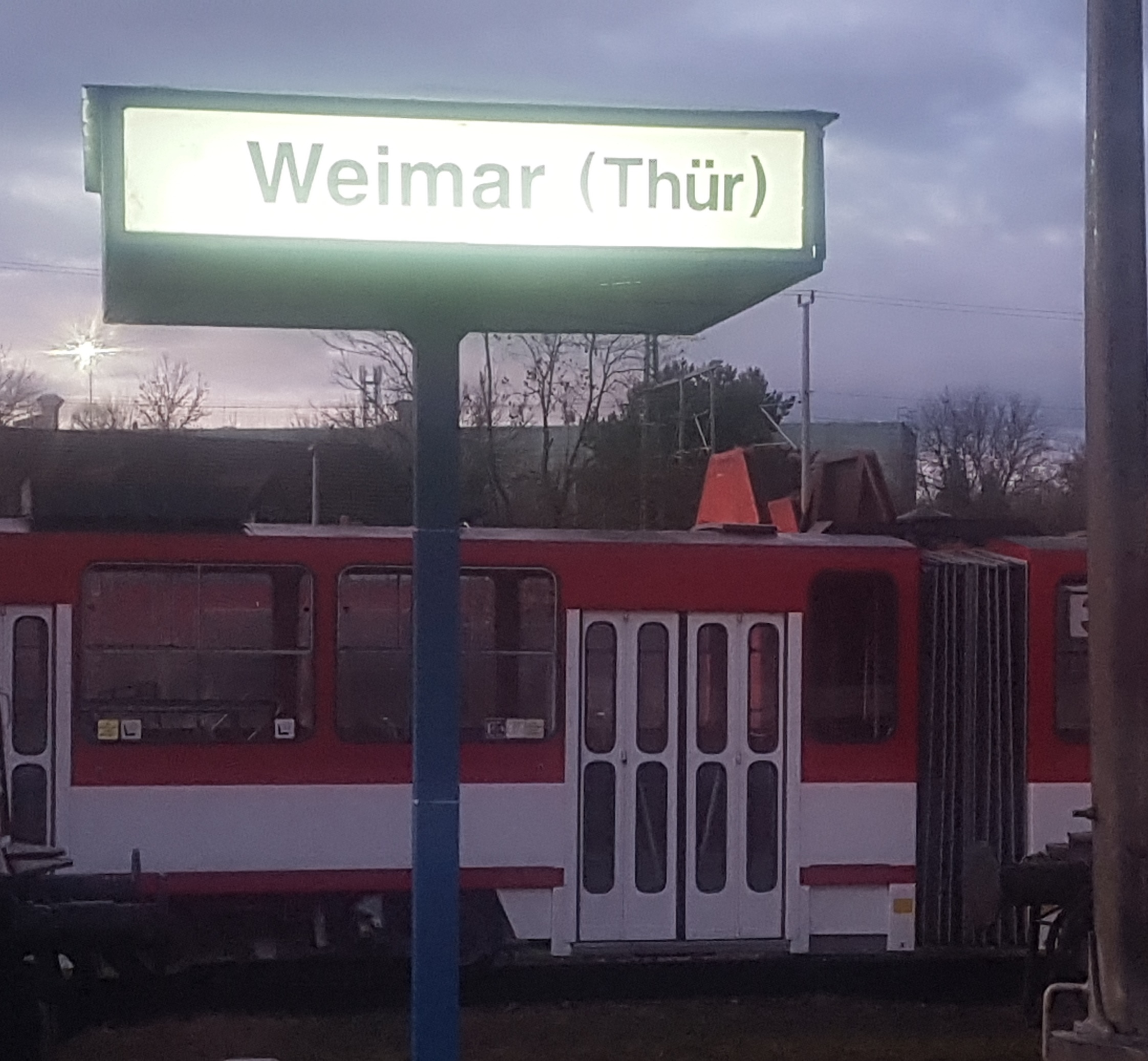
Former Erfurt KT4D in Weimar, Germany
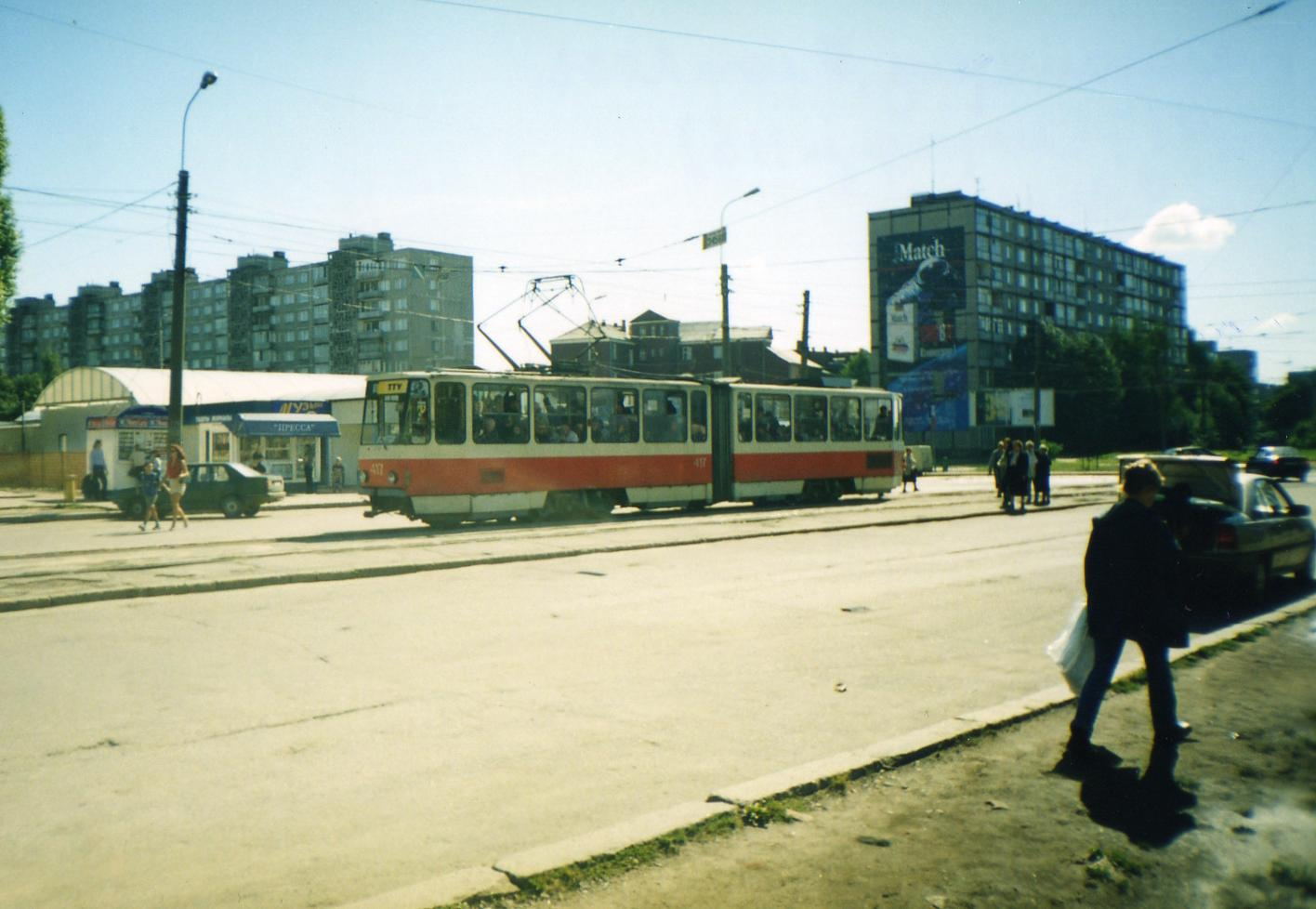
KT4SU in Kaliningrad

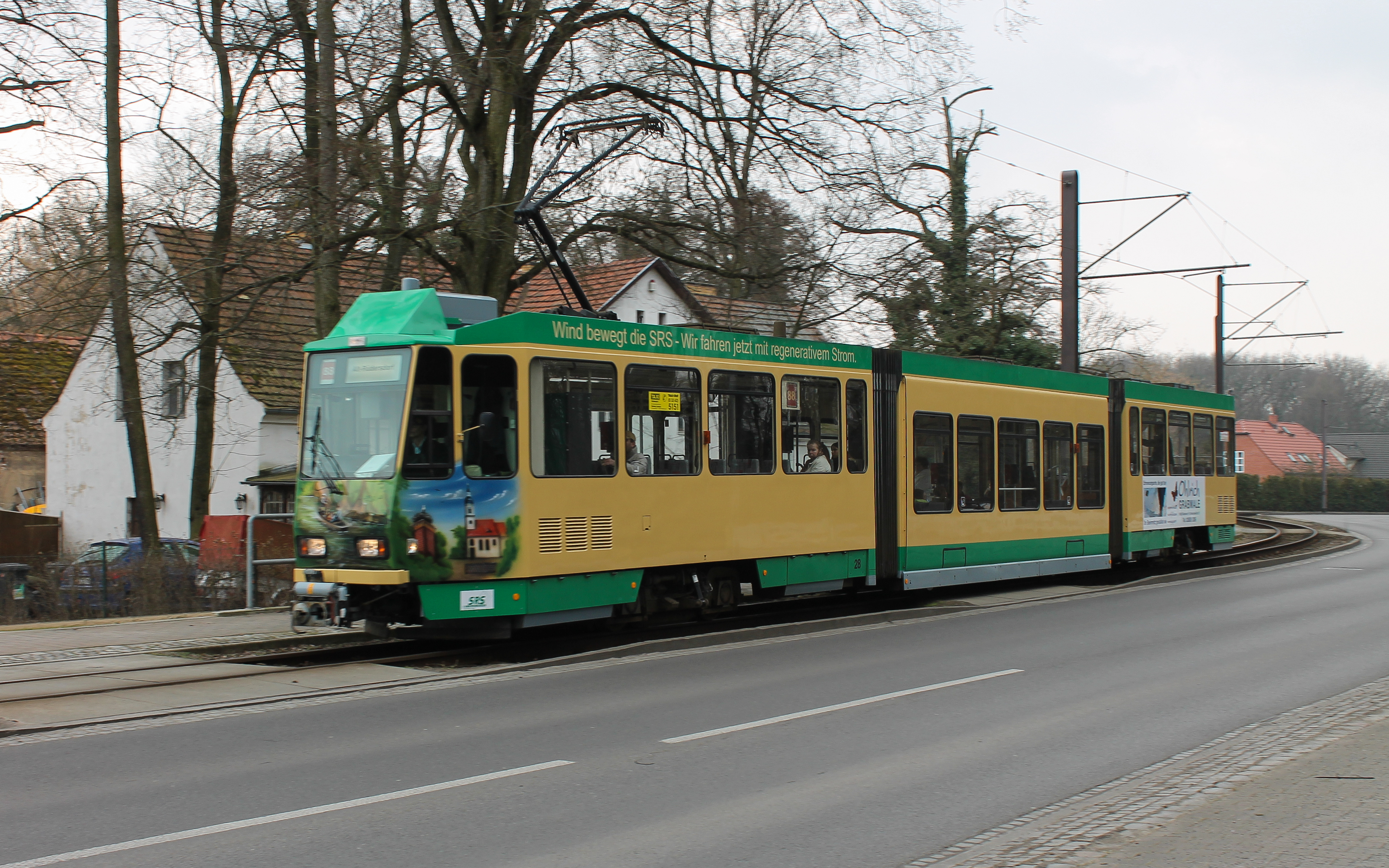
KTNF6 in Schöneiche

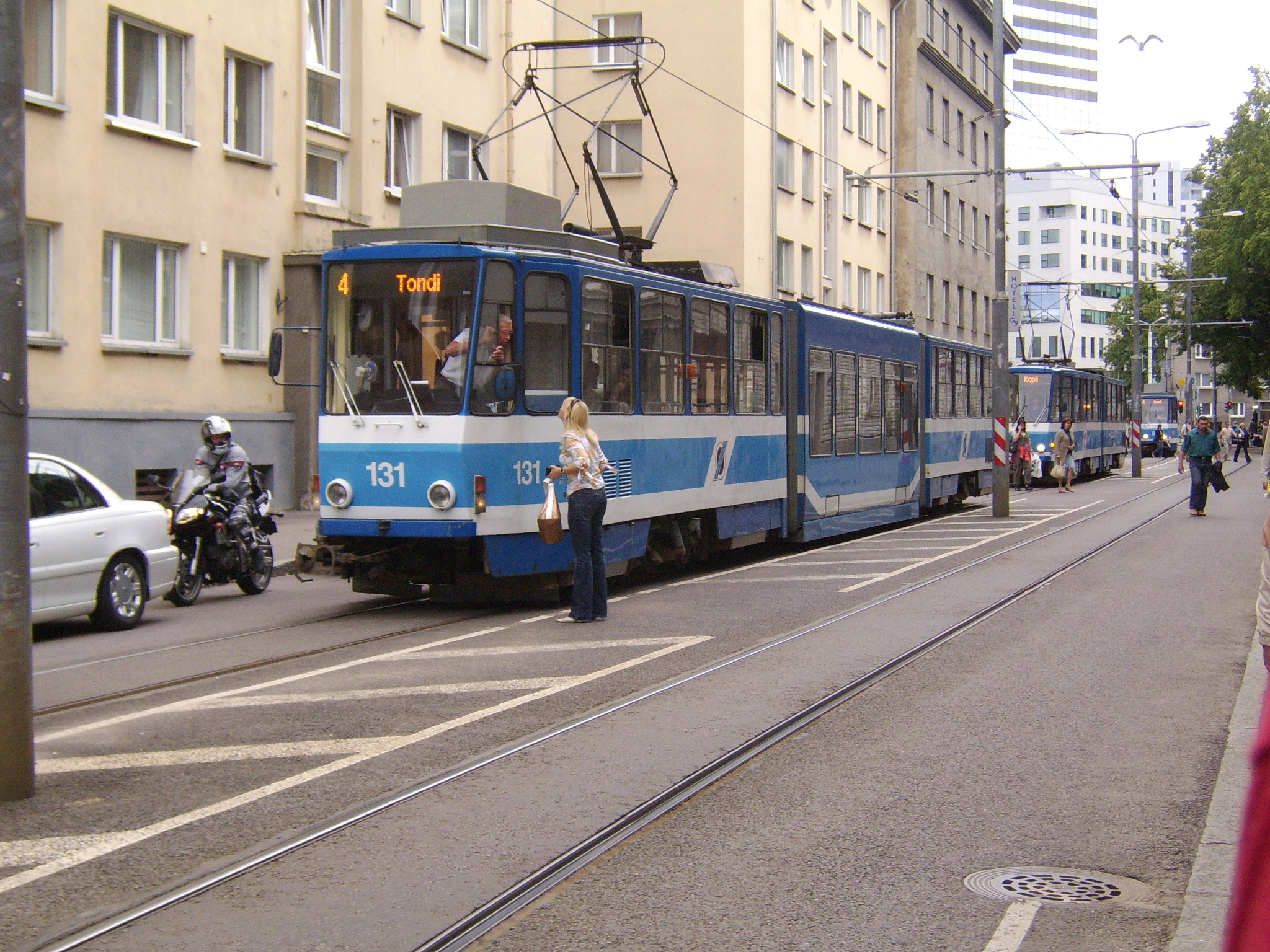
KT6T (KTNF6) in Tallinn

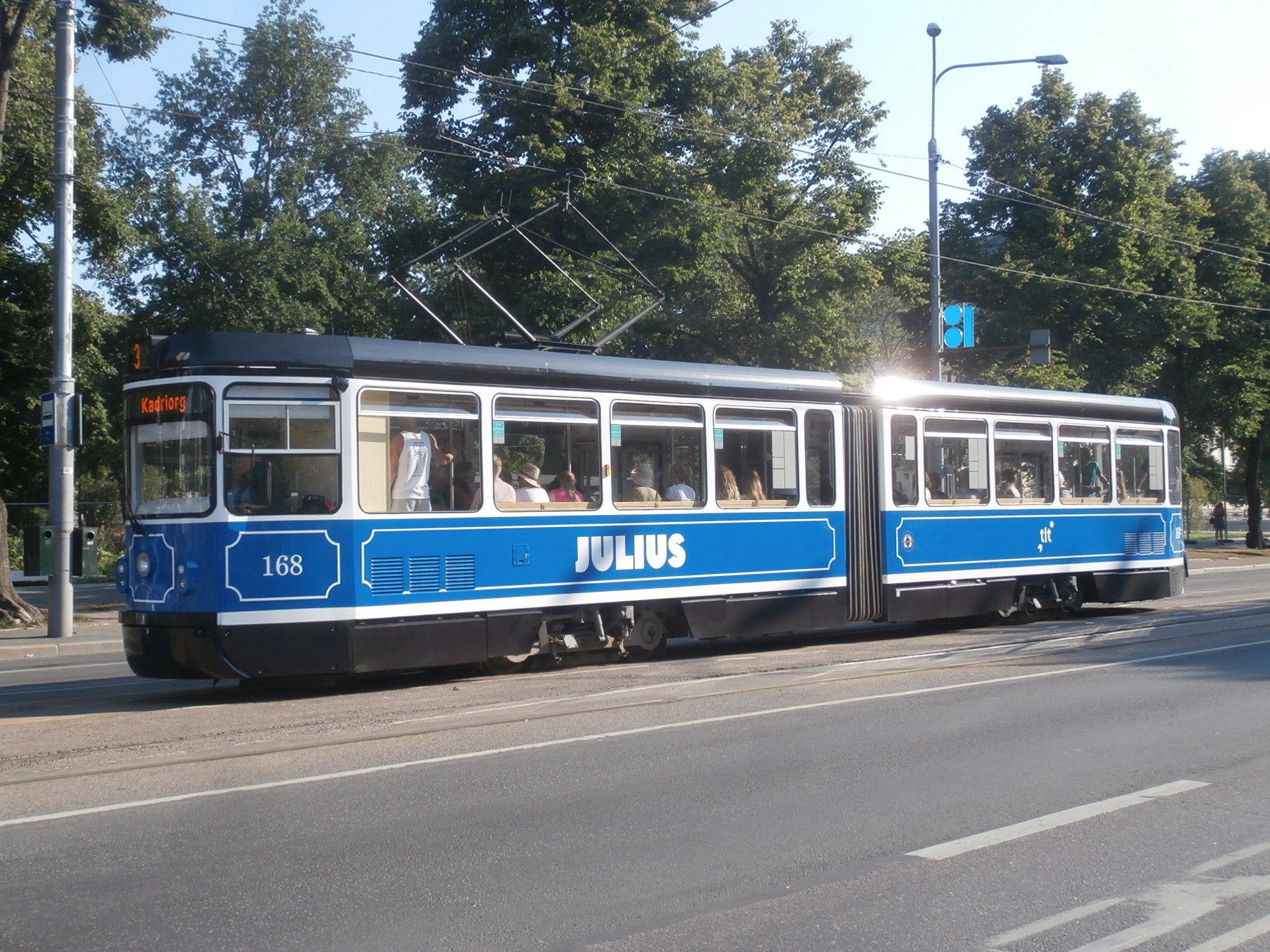
Renovated KT4 in Tallinn

=== KT4SU ===
The Soviet Union ordered the KT4SU for their meter-gauge tramways, the following cities received deliveries:

City	Delivery years	Number delivered
Yevpatoria	1987–90	18
Kaliningrad	1987–90	30
Liepāja	1983–88	22
Lviv	1976–88	145
Pyatigorsk	1988–90	25
Zhytomyr	1981–88	20
Tallinn	1980–90	74
Vinnytsia	1980–90	81
TOTAL	1976–90	415

=== KT4YU ===
The KT4YU is the Yugoslav variant of the tramcar, which were delivered to the Serbian and Croatian capitals. The last KT4s ever produced were delivered to Belgrade in 1997. Those tramcars were equipped with IGBT modules and recuperative braking and named KT4M-YUB (where B stands for Belgrade to be distinguished from Zagreb model). In 2002, 30 Belgrade tramcars were modernized in Goša FOM / Inekon, and marked as KT4-YUBM.

City	Delivery years	Number delivered
Belgrade	1980–97	220
Zagreb	1985–86	51
TOTAL	1980–97	271

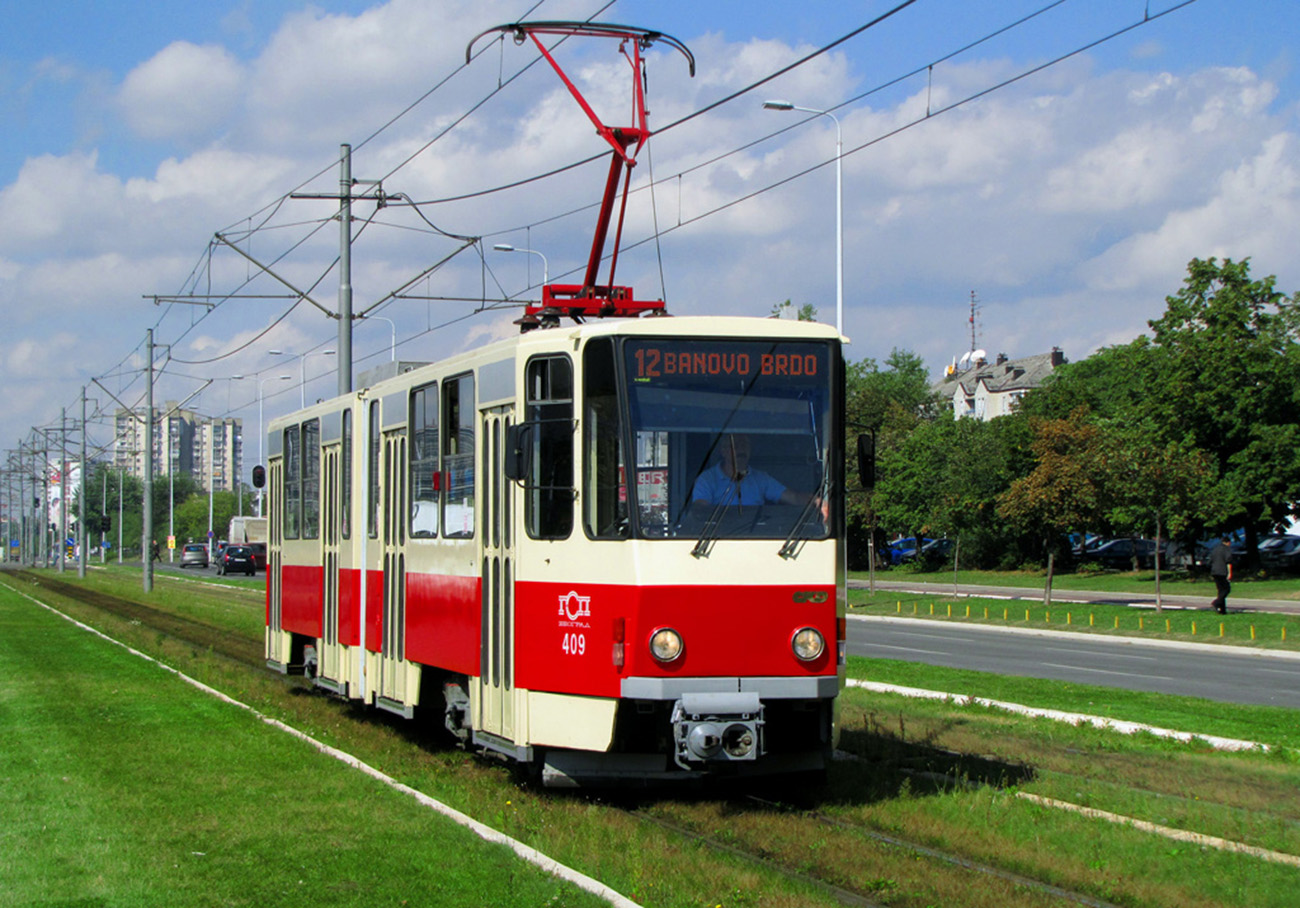
Tatra KT4M-YU (1997) in Belgrade

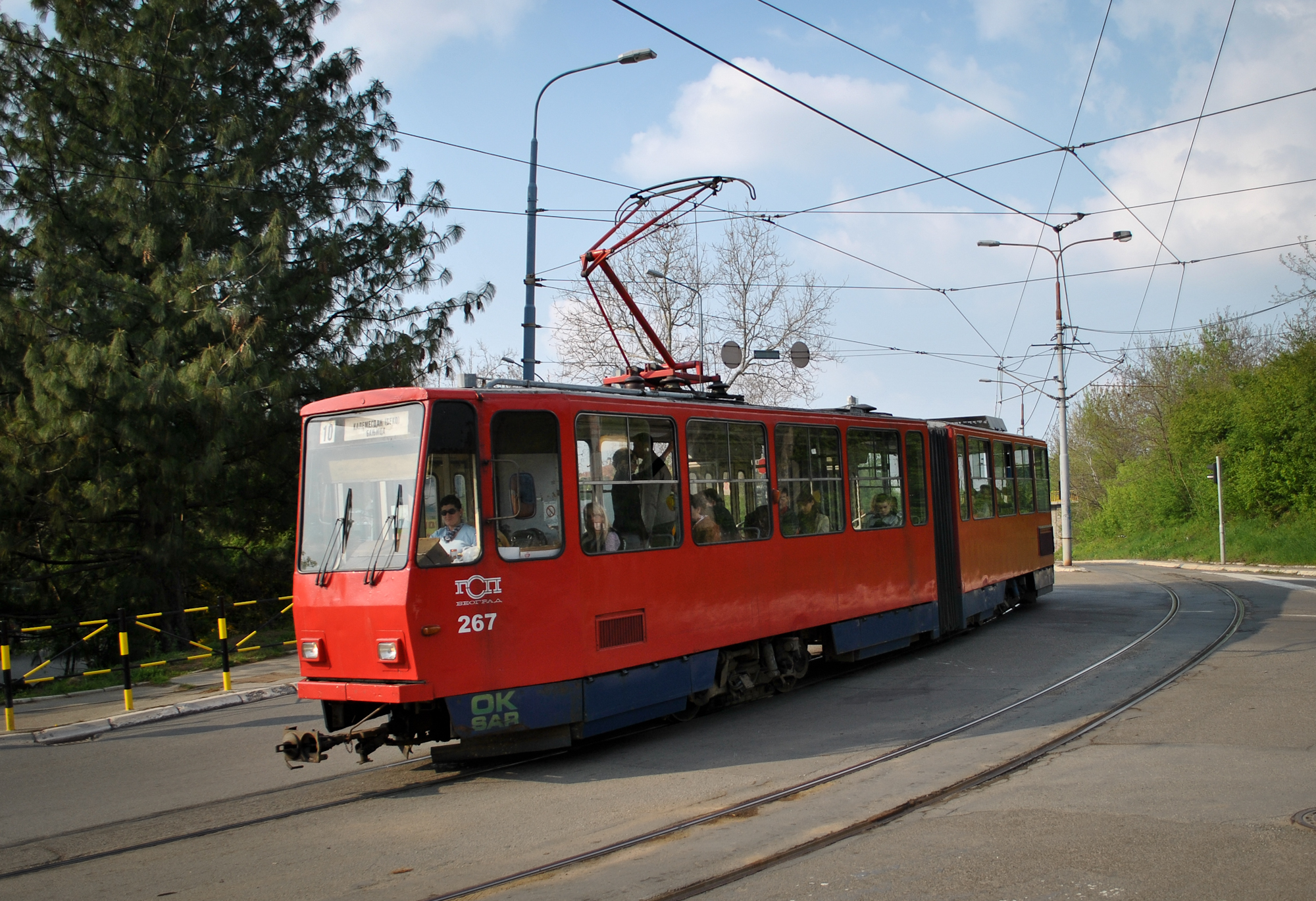
KT4-YUB in Belgrade

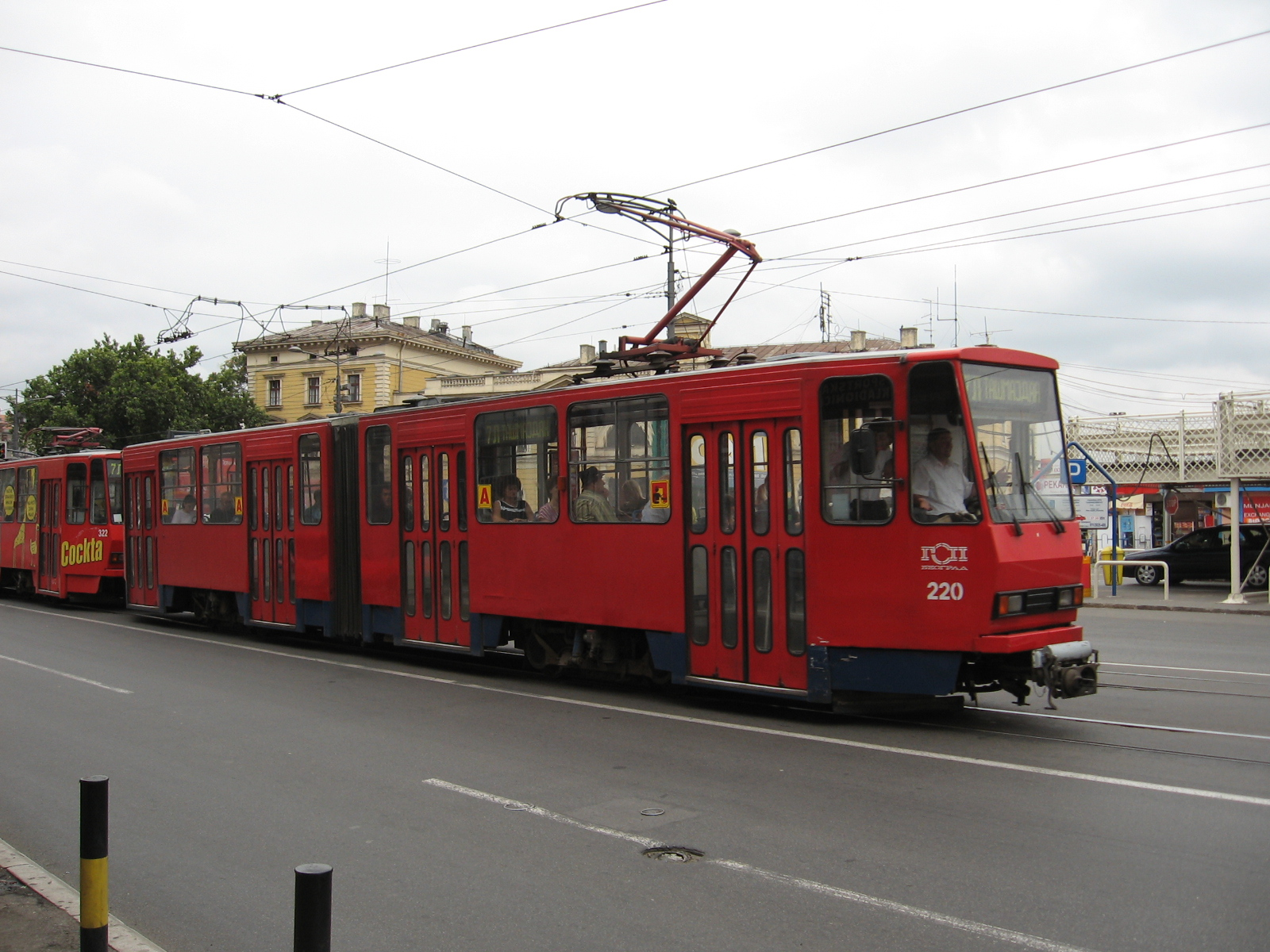
KT4YUBM in Belgrade

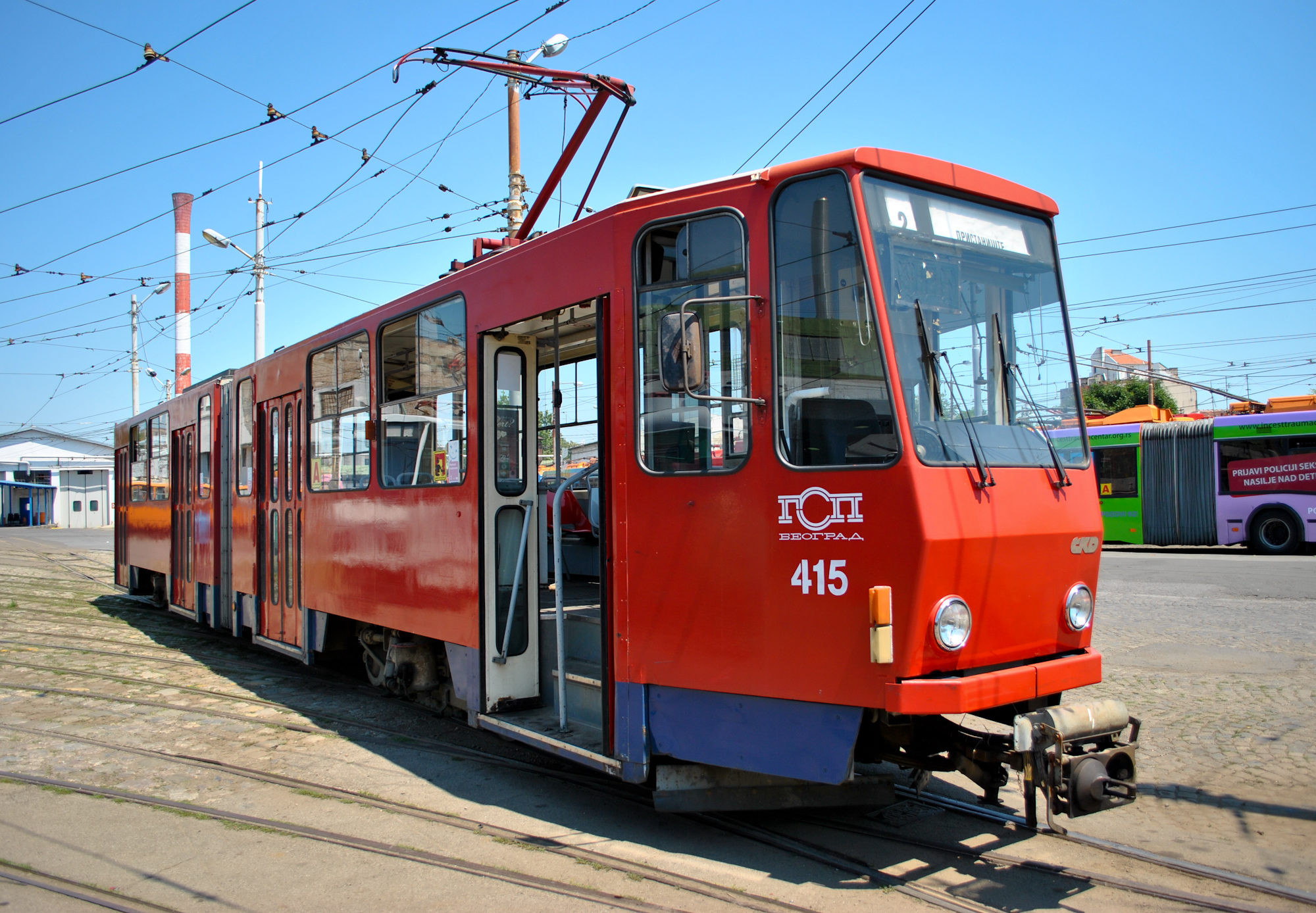
Tatra KT4M-YU (1997) in Belgrade

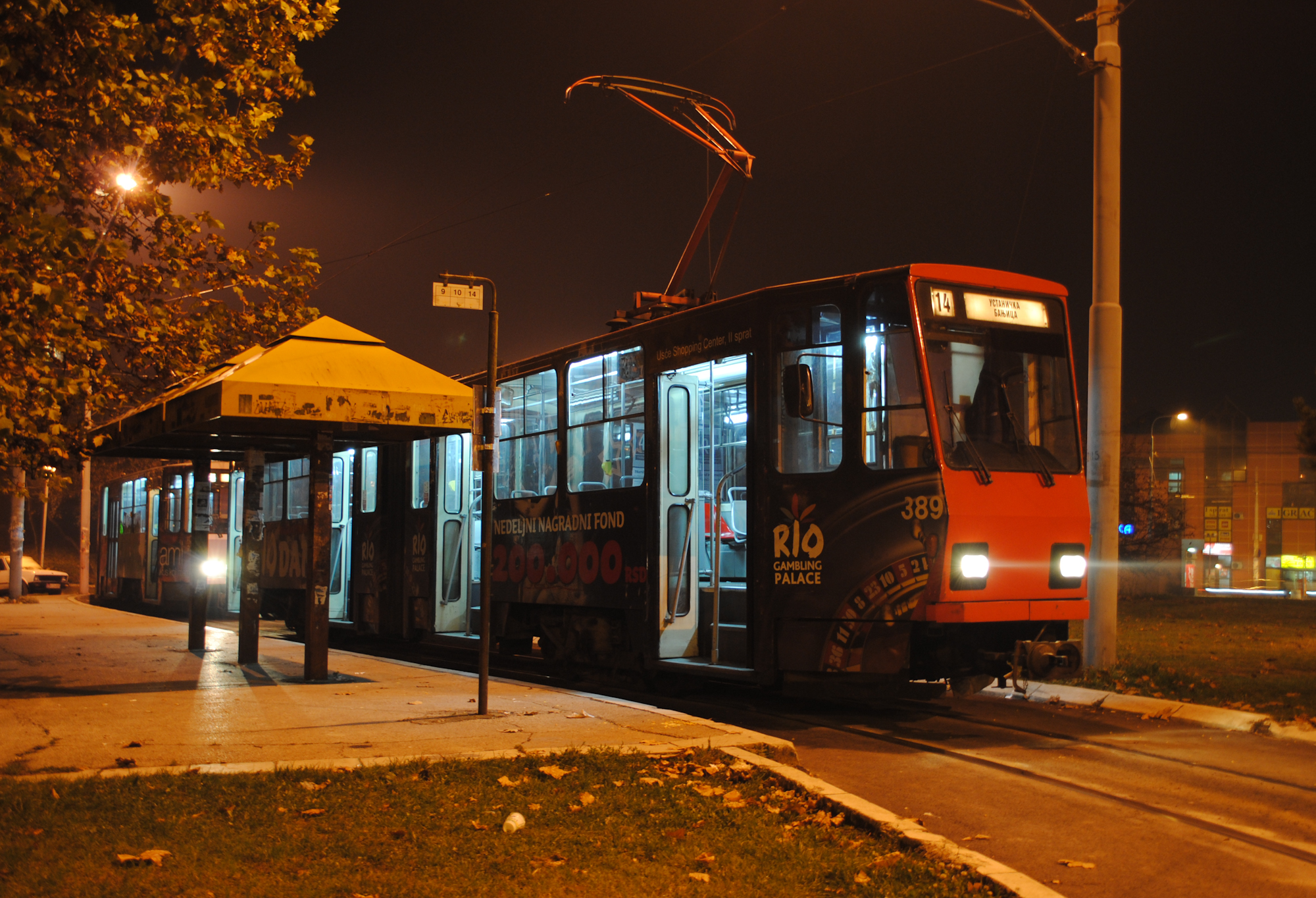
Tatra KT4-YU in Belgrade

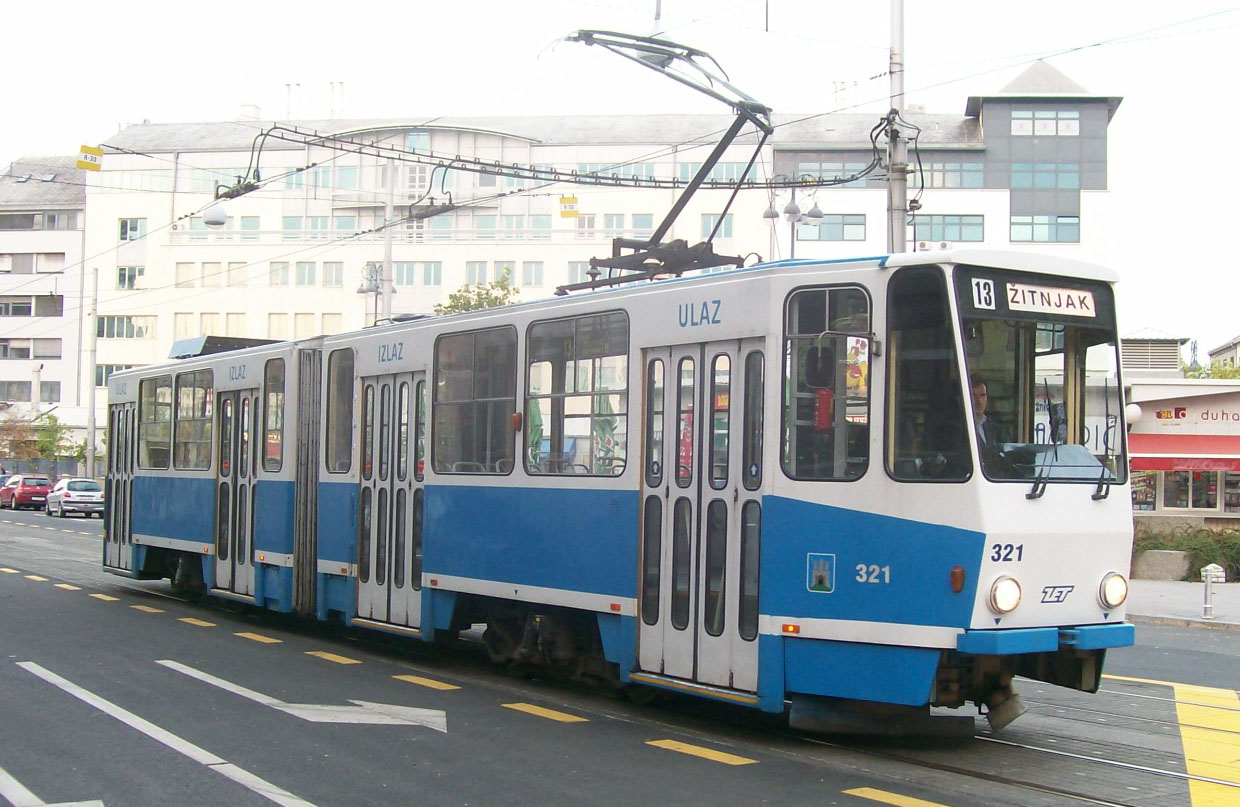
Tatra KT4YU in Zagreb

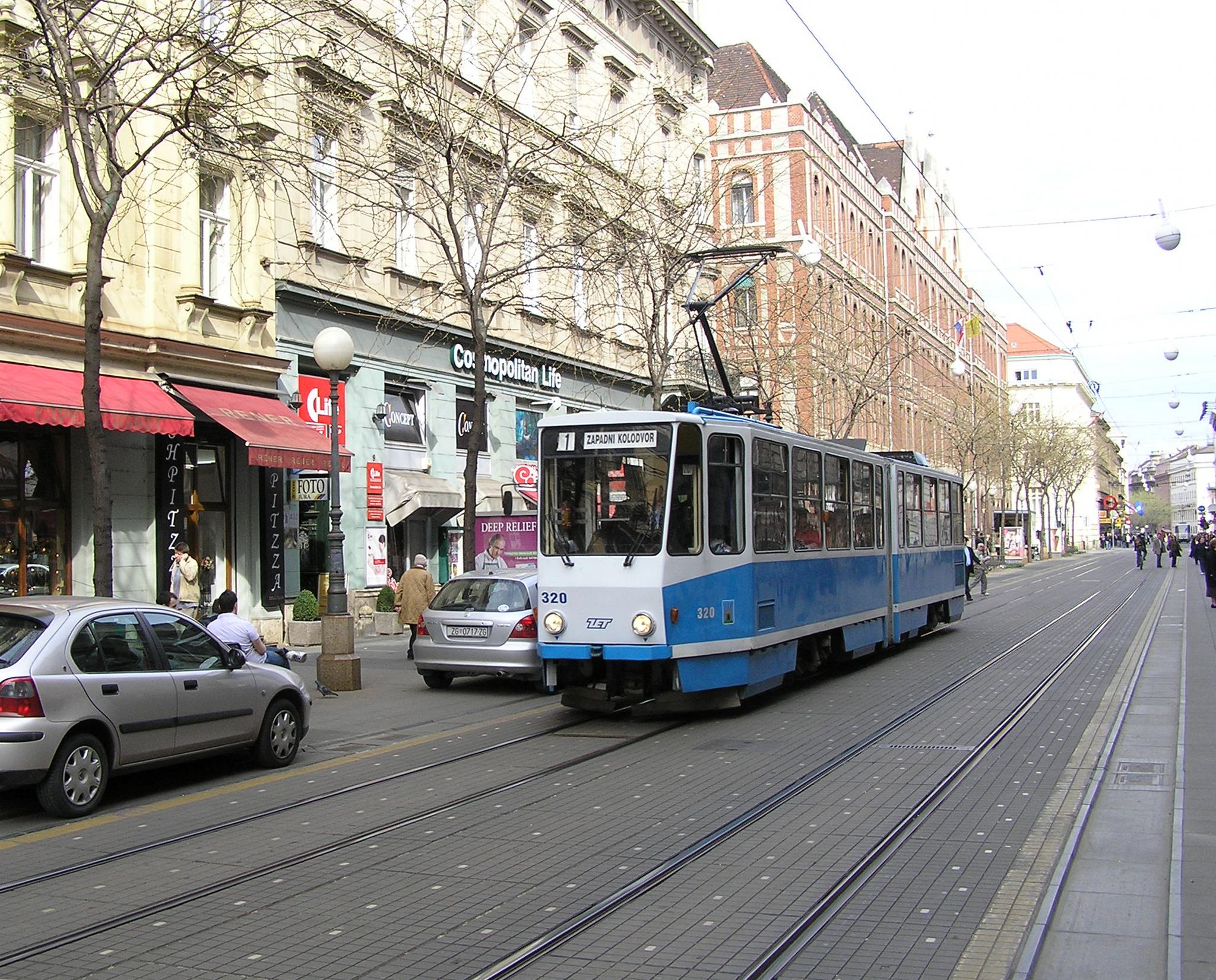
Tatra KT4YU in Zagreb

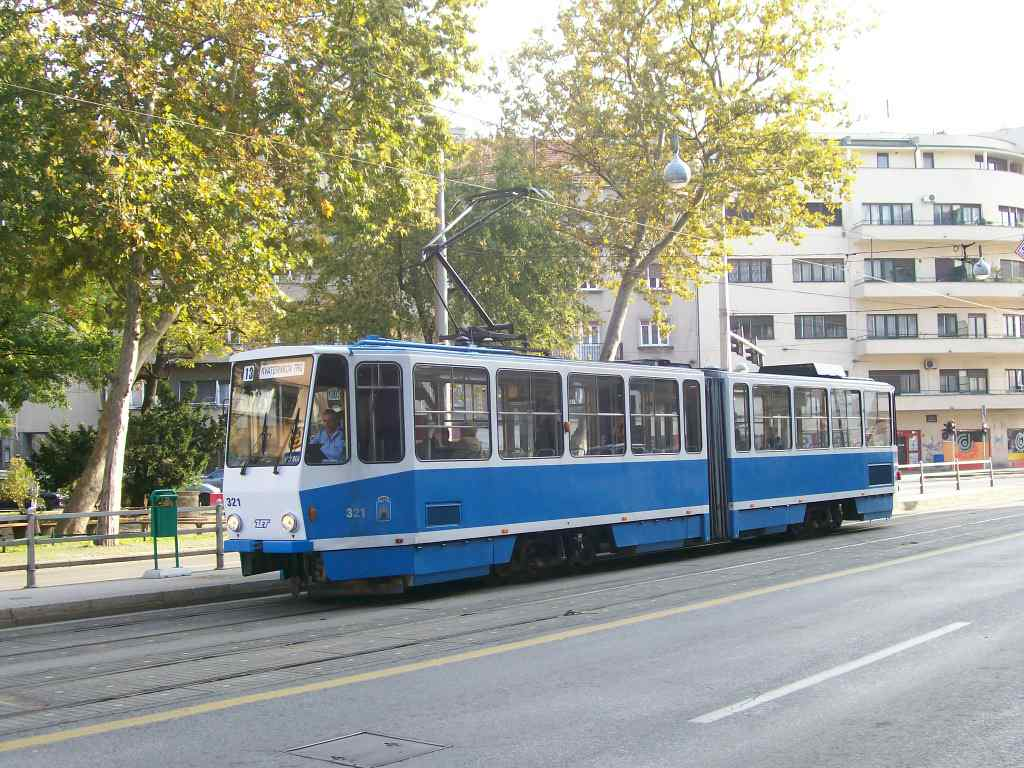
Tatra KT4YU in Zagreb

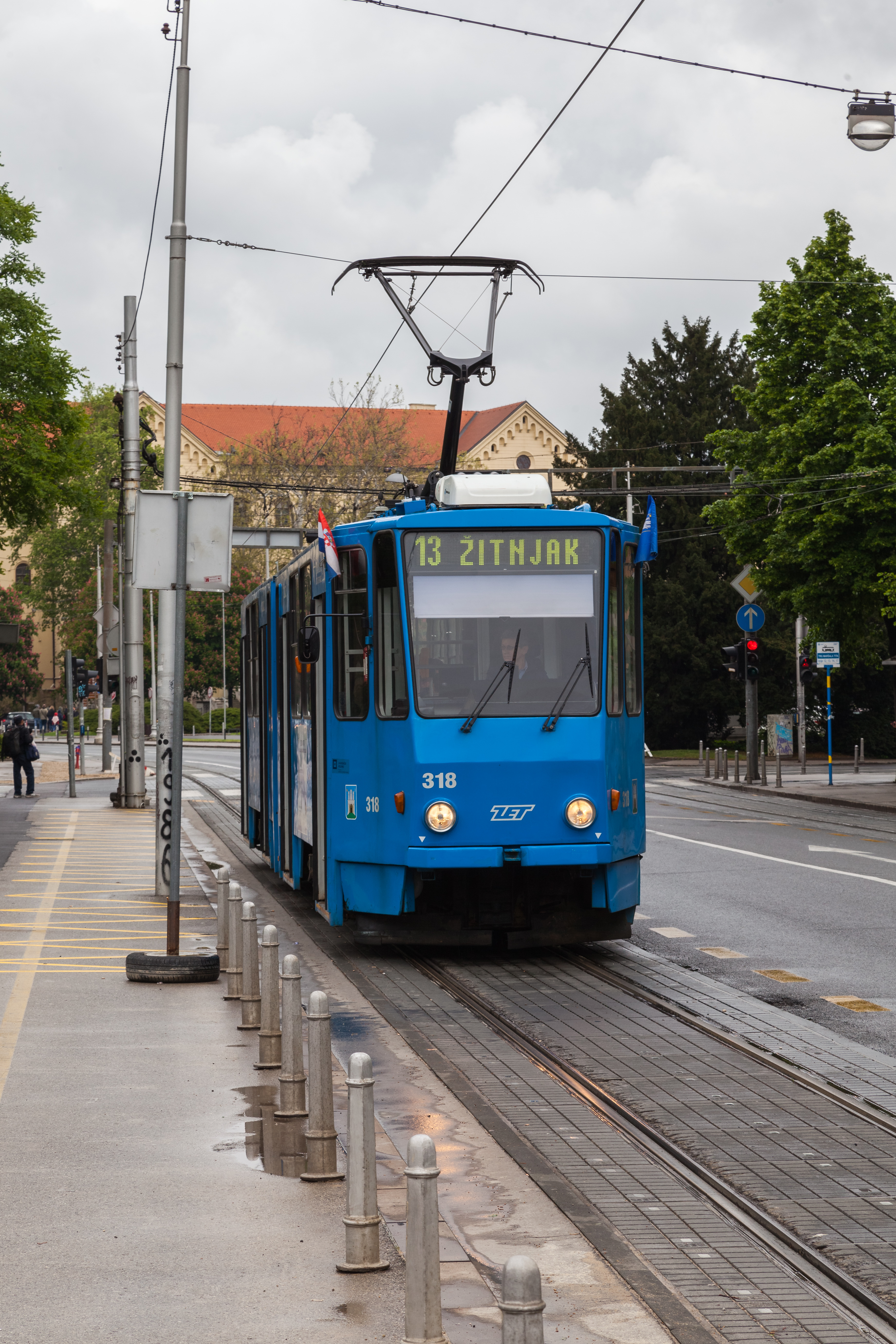
Tatra KT4YU in Zagreb

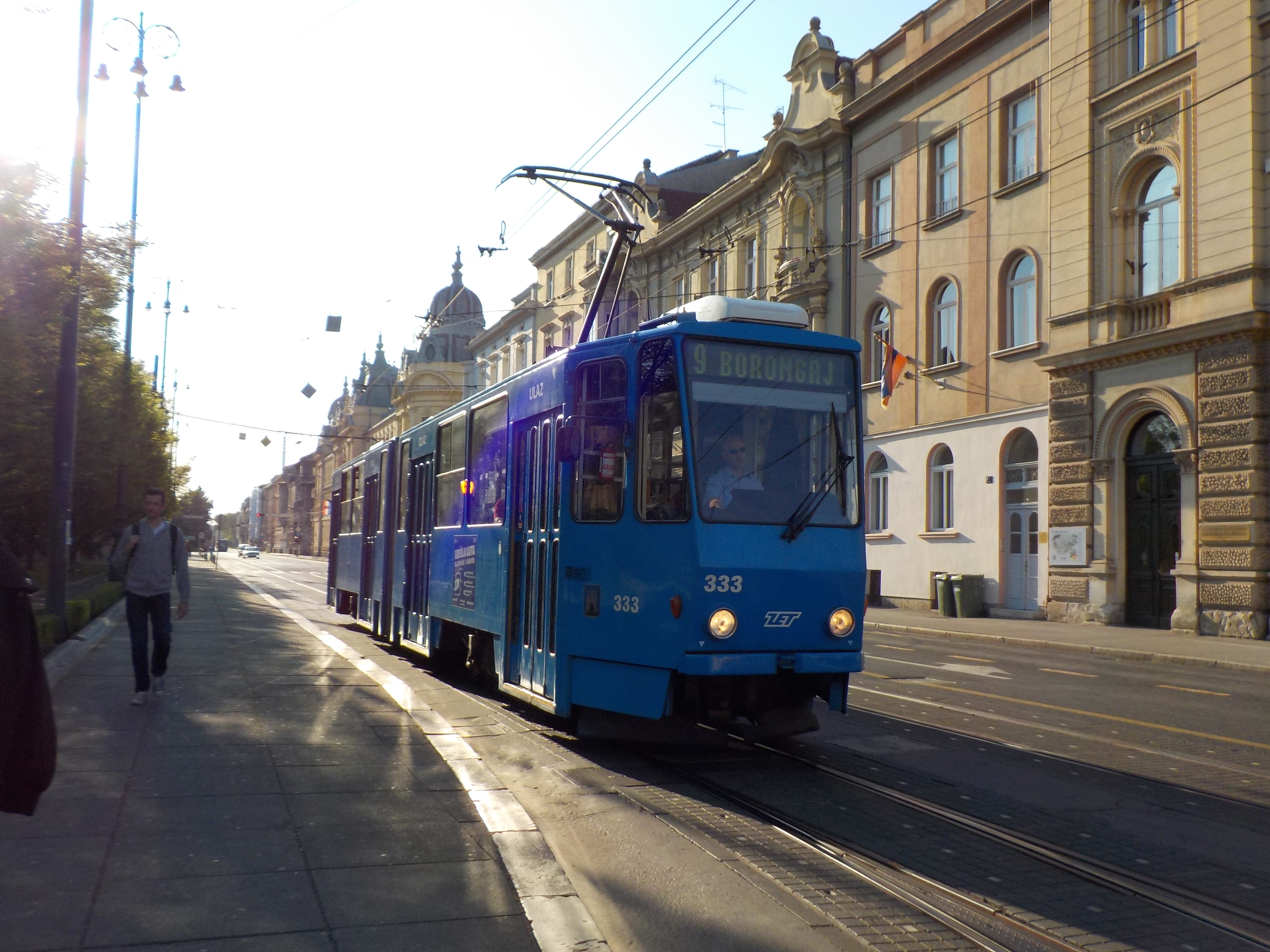
Tatra KT4YU in Zagreb

=== Shenyang ST4 ===
A series of KT4 trams were also produced for Pyongyang, North Korea by the Shenyeng Passenger Vehicle Factory in China named ST4, but have subsequently had their articulation removed due to structural defects of the joint. During their service, they were based at Songsin depot. These trams were fully withdrawn in 1999 and the bodies rebuilt into Chollima 971 articulated trolleybuses or Chollima 961 trolleybuses. Since then, some Chollima 971 trolleybuses were converted into Chollima 961 trolleybuses by removing the rear section. 150 trams were ordered, though only 51 vehicles are known to have been recorded.

These vehicle's main difference was its 2.5 meter wide body, four 45 kW traction motors, a maximum speed of 60 km/h, a seating capacity of 56 and standing capacity of 125. Its weight was also higher, at a net weight of 22.5 tons.

== See also ==
- Tatra KTNF6
- GT4 (tram)
