= Trams in Moscow =

Tram system in Moscow, Russia

Coordinates: 55°45′N 37°37′E

Moscow Tram Network
- Московский трамвай
- Moscow Transport System

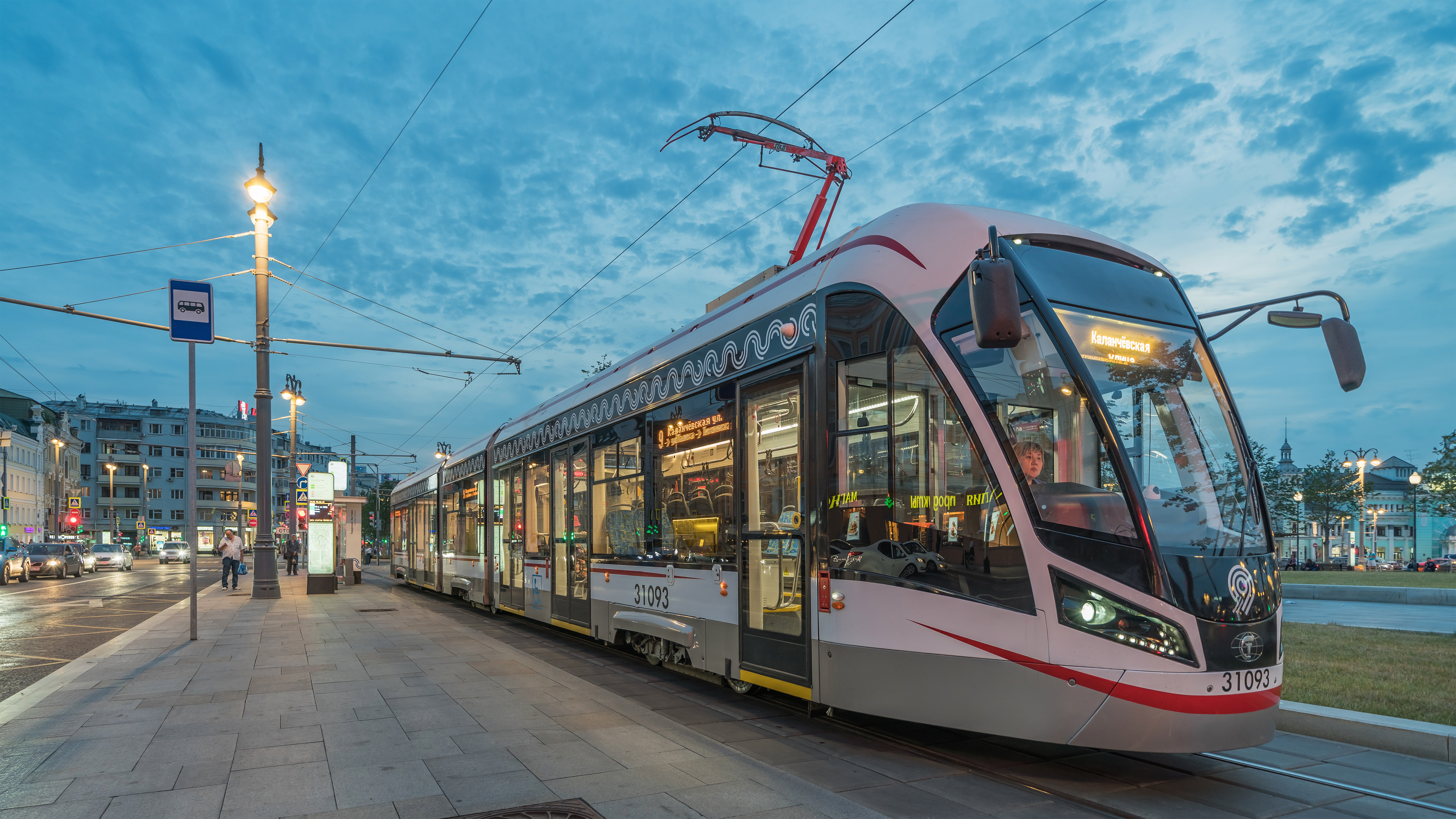
- Vityaz-M tram car near Tverskaya Zastava Square

Operation
- Locale: Moscow, Russia
- Open: 6 April 1899
- Status: Operational
- Lines: 36
- Owner: Government of Moscow
- Operator: Moskovsky Metropoliten

Infrastructure
- Track gauge: 1,524 mm (5 ft)
- Propulsion system: Electricity
- Electrification: Overhead line, 550 V DC
- Depot: 5
- Stock: 464 PC TS 71-931M "Vityaz-M"; 40 PC TS 71-911EM "Lyvonok"; 48 UKVZ KTM-23; 70 71-414 Fokstrot

Statistics
- Track length (total): 418 km (260 mi)
- 2016: 207 million
- Website: https://transport.mos.ru/en Moscow Transport

The Moscow tramway network, which is divided into two sub-networks, is a key element of the public transport system in Moscow, the capital city of Russia. Opened in 1872, it has been operated since 1958 until 2021 by Mosgortrans, a state-owned company.

== Overview ==
The two sub-networks had a combined total route length of 181 km (112 mi), making the whole network the fourth largest in the world, after the networks in Melbourne, St. Petersburg and Berlin.

The tram is historically the second type of urban passenger transport in Moscow, the successor of the Konka (horse-driven tram). However, the presence in Moscow by the beginning of the 20th century horse-railways hindered the development of tram lines. For the laying of tram lines, it was necessary first to free the roads from horse tracks. In 1901, the council purchased the first competition of the Belgian joint-stock company. When, in 1903, came a period of redemption horse-drawn railway the second Belgian joint stock company, the Duma is not solved, as, according to N. I. Astrov: "In Russia we have not experienced builders and engineers". In November 1905, immediately after the events of October elected a new mayor Nikolai Guchkov. Its launching coincided with the revolutionary actions of workers of Moscow in November–December 1905. As soon as the life in the town had returned to normal, Nikolai Ivanovich ordered to proceed with the laying of tram tracks. In February 1907, construction finally began on Myasnitskaya Street, Sretenka Street and Lubyanka Street, from the Passion of the monastery Dmitrovka and further on down, to the Sretenka and Myasnitskaya. The first electric tram routes linked the outskirts of the Garden ring with the center of Moscow, and mainly repeated the routes of the konechnye.

18 May 1910 the city council on the proposal of N. I. Guchkov made a decision about carrying out in 1912 in Moscow, the congress of tram companies.

To the 1910 years the dense network of lines was observed in the western part of the centre with the formation of arcs on the Garden and Boulevard rings. In 1918 the total length of tram lines in the city amounted to 323 km (201 mi) In 1926 the length of track grew to 395 km (245 mi) in 1918, there were 475 cars, and in 1926 – 764. Average speed of trams increased from 7 km/h (4 mph) in 1918 to 12 km/h (7 mph) in 1926.

== History of the network ==
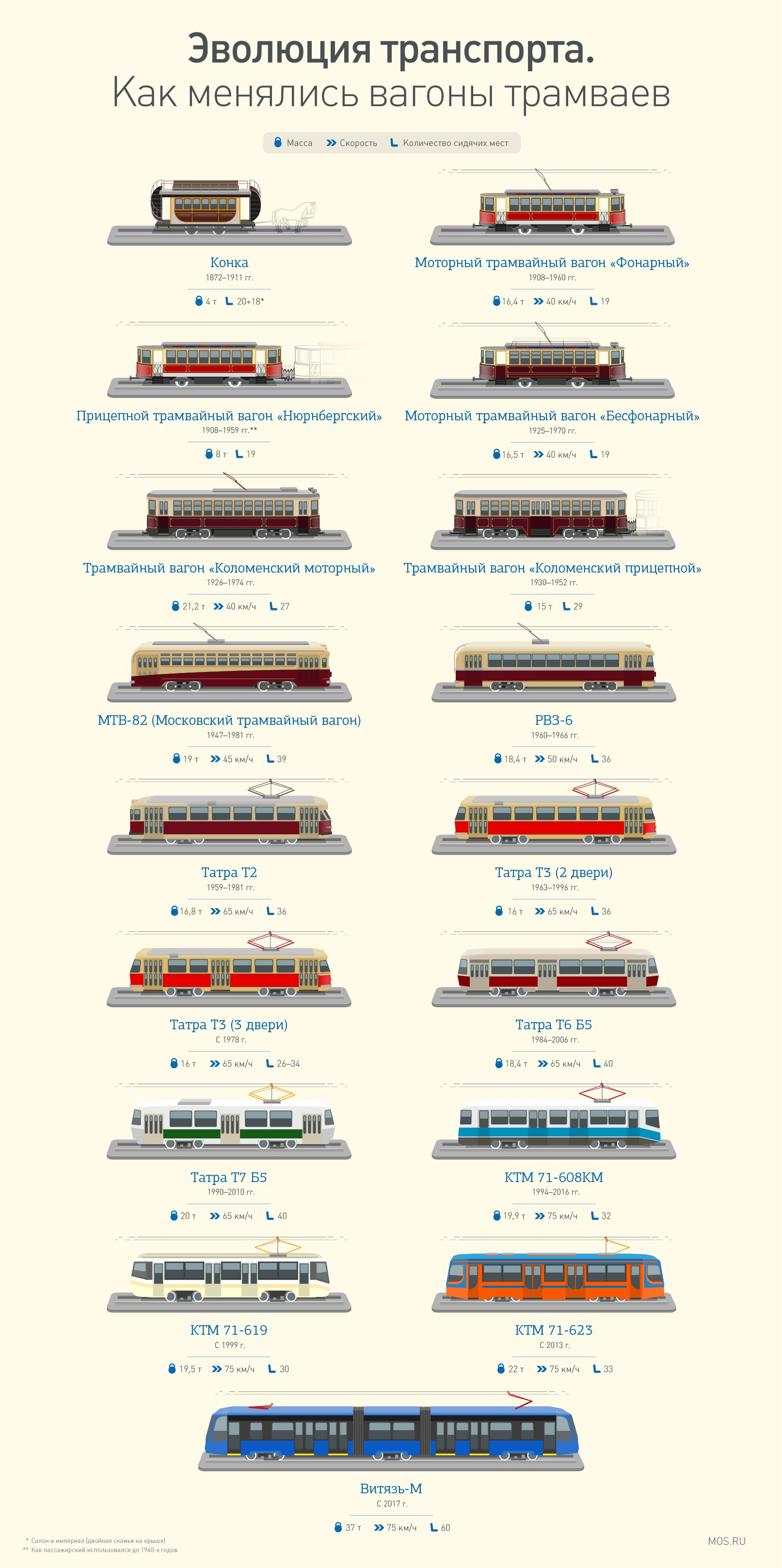
Evolution of trams in Moscow

The apogee of Moscow's tram network was in the early 1930s, when it served both rings (the Boulevard and the Garden) and all connecting streets, gas lines were laid and on the outskirts. In 1934, when the tram was the dominant mode of transport, 2.6 million of the city's population of 4 million used the tram every day. More radical changes took place in the 1940s, when trams were replaced by trolleybuses in the western part of the Boulevard Ring and removed from the Kremlin. With the development of the metro in the 1950s some of the lines leading to the suburbs were closed, and the carriage of freight ceased.

In 1958, the tram and trolleybus administration was merged with the passenger transport department to form the Department of Passenger Transport of Moscow (UPTM), which operated all three types of surface public transport: bus, trolleybus and tram.

In the 1960s and 1970s, tram lines were finally eliminated in the western part of the city and from the Garden Ring. However, new lines were laid in areas that were not served by the metro: Medvedkovo, Chertanovo, Perovo and Novogireevo. After the closure of the lines between Nizhnyaya Maslovka and Tikhvinovskaya streets in 1965 and on Bolshaya Gruzinskaya street in 1973, the lines operating from the Krasnaya Presnya tram depot in the north-west of the city was severed from the rest of the network. In the mid-1990s a new wave of line closures started, mainly on major highways near the city centre. In 1995, the company closed the line on Mira Avenue, then at the Nizhnyaya Maslovka due to the construction of the 3rd ring road. For the same reason in the early 2000s, the rails on Begovaya street, near the Ulitsa 1905 Goda metro station and on Dvintsev street were removed. In 2004, in connection with forthcoming reconstruction, the Leningradskiy avenue line was closed. In 2008 the lines on Lesnaya street and Volokolamskoe highway closed. Between 1989 and 2004 the length of the lines fell from 460 to 420 km (261 mi) (the high point in the 1940s was 560 km). In 1990 daily ridership was over 800,000, but by the late 1990s this had fallen to about 150,000 passengers. From 30 to 31 August 2013 in the framework of the experimental introduction of night routes of public transport route No. 3 is translated to round-the-clock work, however, as of May 2020, the route now is back to operating from 5:00 to 1:00.

The tram network has been expanded and modernized in recent years: 3 new lines are being built.

== Tram network today ==
As of 2021, Moscow has introduced open gangway trams beginning with service in the north-west of the city. These trains accommodate 110 passengers and have 18% more seats than those of the previous generation, as well as USB ports and media screens.

In August 2021, Moscow ended operations of the Czech-designed high-floor Tatra T3 trams, which had operated in the city since 1963.

In 2024, the testing of self-driving Vityaz-M version was launched. On 3rd of September 2025, the first fully self-operational tram in the world entered it's service on Line 10 in Strogino District, however, driver's presence was still required in case of emergency. By 2026, they entered service on other lines along with regular trams.

Along with the self-driving Lvyonok tram on route 10, in September 2025 Moscow's government launched the wireless tram line on Akademika Sakharova avenue, between Chistiye Prudy metro station and Ploschad Tryokh Vokzalov railway station. New line was firstly operated by temporary route 90, until it was replaced by route T1, a first route of Moscow Tram Diameters project. Lately, in December, wireless trams started their service on formerly closed line on Trifonovskaya street between MIIT and Rizhskiy Rail Terminal with route 5 re-inaugurated 30 years later since its closure.

As of October 2026, a new line in Ivanovskoe district is being constructed and expected to be launched in late 2026 - early 2027.

== List of routes ==
External image
- Official Moscow tram map

Moscow tram map (2026-11)

А. Novokonnaya ploschad' (Square) – Chistyye prudy subway station

1. Moskvoretsky Market – Ulitsa Akademika Yangelya (Academic Yangel St.)

2. Kursky Railway Station – 3rd Vladimirskaya St.

4. Bulvar Rokossovskovo subway station – Kursky Railway Station

5. Belorusskiy Rail Terminal - Rizhskiy Rail Terminal

6. Sokol subway station – Bratsevo

7. Bulvar Rokossovskovo subway station – Belorussky Rail Terminal

10. Shchukinskaya subway station – Ulitsa Kulakova (Kulakov St.)

11. Ostankino – Vostochnoye Izmaylovo

12. Vostochnoye Izmaylovo – Dubrovka MCC

13. Kalanchovskaya St. – Metrogorodok

14. Oktyabrskaya subway station – Universitet subway station

15. Sokol subway station – Tallinskaya Str.

16. Novodanilovsky Proezd (Drive) – Ulitsa Akademika Yangelya (Academic Yangel St.)

17. Ostankino – Medvedkovo

21. Tallinskaya St. – Schukinskaya subway station

23. Sokol subway station – Mikhalkovo

25. Ostankino – Sokolniki subway station

26. Oktyabrskaya subway station – Universitet subway station (through Cheryomushki)

27. Voikovskaya subway station – Dmitrovskaya subway station

28. Prospekt Marshala Zhukova (Avenue of marshal Zhukov) – Sokol subway station

29. Dmitrovskaya subway station – Mikhalkovo

30. Ulitsa Kulakova (Kulakov St.) – Mikhalkovo

31. Prospekt Marshala Zhukova (Avenue of marshal Zhukov) – Voikovskaya subway station

32. Kursky Railway Station – Partizanskaya subway station

36. Metrogorodok – Novogireyevo

37. Kalanchyovskaya St. – Novogireyevo

38. Cheryomushki – Proezd Entuziastov (Enthusiasts' drive)

39. Chistye prudy subway station – Universitet subway station

43. Ugreshskaya MCC – Sokolniki subway station

46. Bulvar Rokossovskovo subway station – Oktyabrskoe tram depot

47. Nagatino – Oktyabrskaya subway station

49. Nagatino – Novodanilovsky Proezd (Drive)

50. Proezd Entuziastov (Enthusiasts' drive) – Novoslobodskaya subway station

T1. Universitet subway station - Metrogorodok

T2. Chertanovskaya subway station - Novogireyevo

== Rolling stock ==
This table does not include vehicles on short term trials and does not include vehicles that are purely in museum service.

Tram	Modification	In service since	Out of service since	Number in service	Remarks
PC TS 71-931 'Vityaz'	71-931 'Vityaz-M'	2016		464	
Pesa Twist	71-414 Fokstrot	2014	2023	70	Built by polish company Pesa and certified in Russia as trams constructed by russian Uraltransmash. As of 2026 most Pesa trams transferred to Ufa.
UKVZ 71-623	-02	2012	2026	0	
PC TS 71-911EM 'Lyvonok'	71-911EM	2021		140	The ones made in 2025 - 2026 and operating in city's center equipped with batteries for wireless movement.
Tatra T3	Tatra T3SU	1963		0	None in passenger service, only runs as work cars. 17 three door trams, 3 two door trams
Tatra T3	Tatra T3T	1993	2008	0	Upgraded version, all later further upgraded into MTT*
Tatra T3	Tatra T3RF	1999	2002	0	Upgraded version, transferred to Brno
Tatra T3	Tatra-Reis	1992	1999	0	Upgraded version, some transferred to other cities, others further upgraded.
Tatra T3	Tatra KT3R	2007		0	Three section tram built from two ends of a T3 with a new middle section, currently out of service
Tatra T3	MTTCh	2004	2021	0	Upgraded by Moscow Tram Repair Plant
Tatra T3	MTTE	2008	2021	0	Upgraded by Moscow Tram Repair Plant
Tatra T3	MTTM	2003	2021	0	Upgraded by Moscow Tram Repair Plant, mostly modernised into MTTA
Tatra T3	MTTA	2003	2021	0	Upgraded by Moscow Tram Repair Plant, mostly transferred to other cities.
UKVZ 71-619	71-619K	2000		0	None currently actually in service including 1 each of museum and service vehicle
UKVZ 71-619	KTMA	2008		0	Upgraded by Moscow Tram Repair Plant, none in service
UKVZ 71-619	71-619AC	2007	2021	0	Mostly transferred to other cities.
UKVZ 71-619	71-619KS	2002	2019	0	
UKVZ 71-619	71-621	1999			Shortened 71-619
UKVZ 71-619	71-619KT	2005	2017	0	Transferred to other cities.
UKVZ 71-619	71-616	1996			71-619 with foreign technology
UKVZ 71-619	71-619A-01	2009	2020	0	Different motors when compared to 71-619A, transferred to other cities
UKVZ 71-619	71-619A	2007		0	
PTMZ 71-134	71-134A	2006		0	1 museum car.
Luhanskteplovoz LT-5		2003		0	1 museum car
UKVZ 71-608	71-608K	1990		0	1 museum car
UKVZ 71-608	71-608KM	1994		0	
UKVZ 71-608	71-617	1996		0	training car
UKVZ 71-608	71-608	1998	2007	0	
UTM 71-405	71-405-08	2007		0	
UKVZ 71-630		2006			
Alstom Citadis	71-801	2013		0	Not in service.
Pragoimex Vario LF		2009		0	
GS-4		1963			11 built by Kuibyshevskiy Tram and Trolleybus Repair Plant, 8 built by VARZ
BF		1927		0	
F*		1946		0	
Luhanskteplovoz LT-10		1997		0	
2-axle motor car		1920		0	built by SVARZ

== See also ==
- List of town tramway systems in Russia
- Moscow Metro
- Moscow Monorail
- Transport in Moscow
