= 71-931 =

Russian low-floor tram car

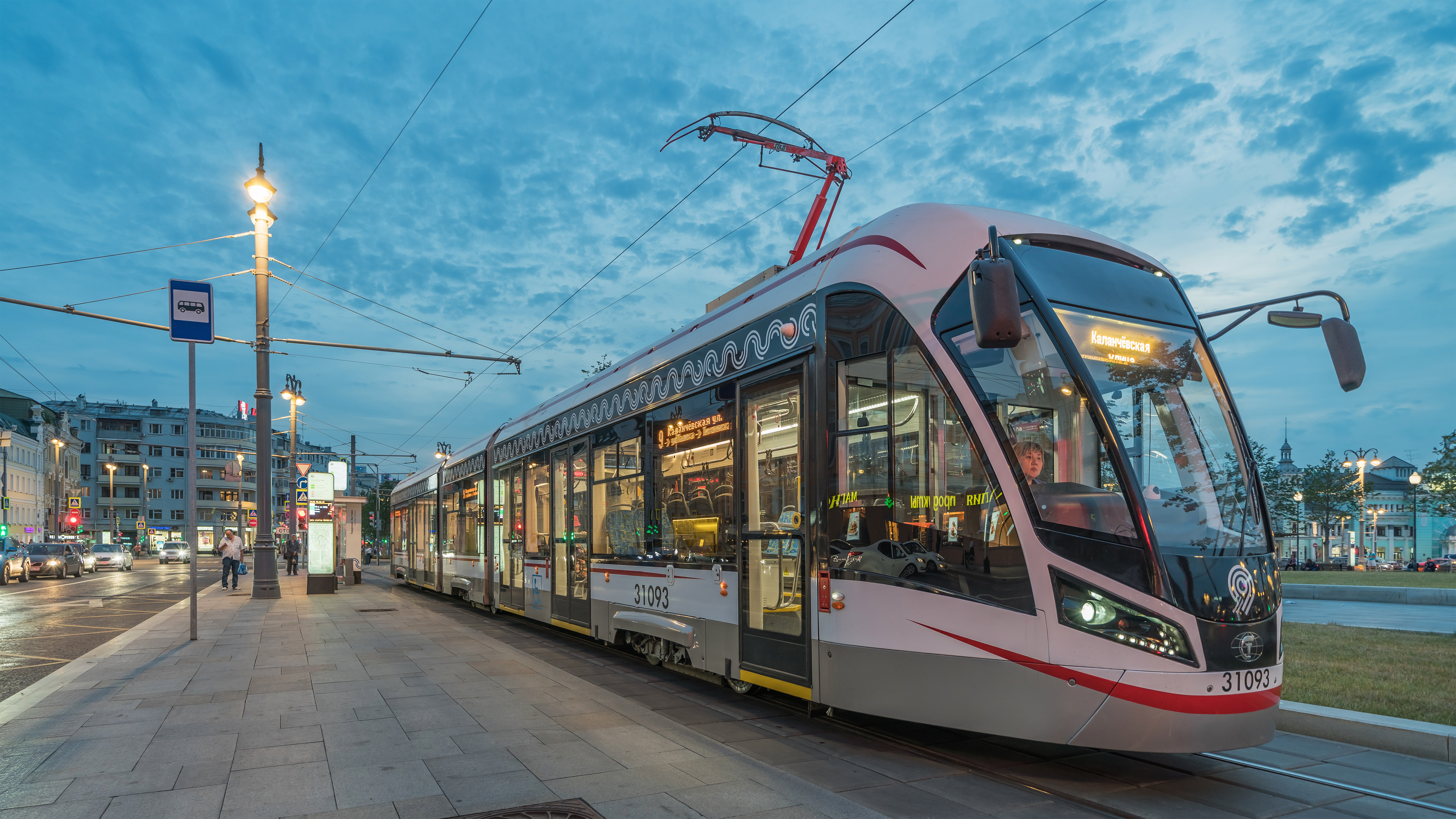
- Vityaz-M in Moscow

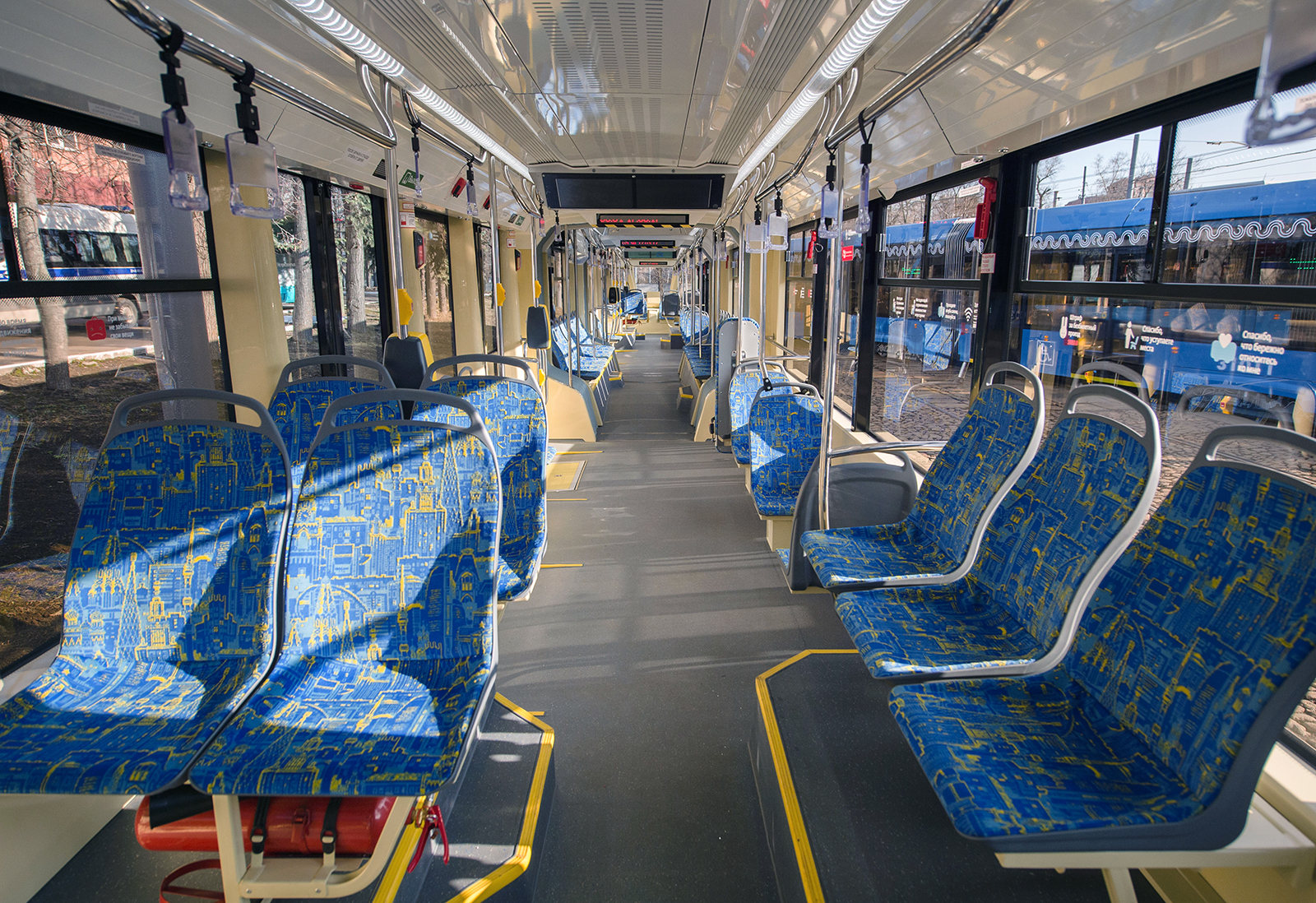
- Interior of "Vityaz-M"
- Manufacturers: PK Transportnye Sistemy Russia; Tverskoy Vagonostroitelniy Zavod Russia
- Constructed: 2014-OT
- Number built: 434
- Capacity: 71-931: 53 seats, 320 standing 71-931M: 60/64 seats, 265 standing (at 8 p/m2)

Specifications
- Train length: 71-931: 27,000 mm (88 ft 7 in); 71-931M: 27,500 mm (90 ft 3 in)
- Width: 2,500 mm (8 ft 2 in)
- Height: 3,500 mm (11 ft 6 in)
- Doors: 6
- Articulated sections: 3
- Maximum speed: 75 km/h
- Weight: 71-931: 37 t
- Power output: 6 × 72 kW
- Power supply: 550 V
- Current collection: Pantograph
- AAR wheel arrangement: Bo-Bo-Bo
- Bogies: 3
- Braking systems: Electric, disc, magnetic
- Track gauge: 1,524 mm (5 ft)

71-931 "Vityaz" (Russian: "Витязь", lit. 'Knight') is a Russian three-unit six-axle 100% low-floor tram car created by LLC "PK Transportnye Sistemy" (transl. "Transportation Systems", PK TS) and manufactured in cooperation by PK TS and Transmashholding at the facilities of the Tver Carriage Works. Currently exists in two versions: the basic model Vityaz and 71-931M Vityaz-M modification with modified front and rear mask, different interior and Russian-designed traction motors. In operation in St. Petersburg, Krasnodar and Moscow's Bauman, Oktyabrskoye and Rusakov depots.

== Design ==
The car is based on three rotating 2-axle bogies which design was patented by PK TS. The main design feature of said bogies is that the traction motors are located below the floor (compact enough for allowing low floor level) so wider gangways are allowed despite the bogie being rotational. The traction drive is asynchronous, Vityaz model uses Czech-designed traction motors which were replaced with Russian-designed in Vityaz-M model. Each axle is powered by one 72 kW motor with a total output of 432 kW.

The body consists of two long end units with two double-leaf and one single-leaf doors each, one of which is equipped with driver cabin, and a short middle unit with no doors.

Internal layout is designed with maximum space efficiency in mind with most of the seats facing the axle of the car for allowing more standing space while retaining big number of seats. First unit has a large area for a wheelchair/pram/bicycle against the third door. Most of the seats are not elevated except the ones above the first and third bogies. The car's environmental control has two air conditioners supplying all three units and the driver cab with cold air and multiple electric heat guns for heating. Each door has touch panels inside and outside for opening by passenger with the driver retaining the ability to override it.

The car is loosely based on an Ust-Katav carriage works (UKVZ) design with some of the blueprints said to be purchased from their original legal owner. This can be noticed in similarities between Vityaz model and UKVZ's partially low-floor 71-631 model body configurations.

The Vityaz-M cars are supplied with about 90% of Russian-designed parts with the inter-unit passes and traction retarders being only major exceptions.

== History ==
=== Testing and certification ===
The first tramcar entered for testing facility to Moscow Bauman Depot in November 2014, where it received onboard number 0203. The tram received the certificate of conformity in March 2015. 71-931 become the first Russian tram car that pass voluntary certification in road transport.

The tram 71-931M entered for break-in to Volgograd metrotram line in July 2016. The break-in to in Moscow was in March 2017.

=== Participation in exhibitions ===
- ExpoCityTrans – October 29 – November 1, 2014 (in Moscow).
- Innoprom – July 8–11, 2015 (in Yekaterinburg).
- ExpoCityTrans – November 29 – December 1, 2016 (in Moscow).

=== Supplies ===
- April 2015 – PK Transportnye Sistemy won an auction for supply of 10 cars 71–931 to St. Petersburg during 2015–2017.
- In September 2016 – Consortium of "PK Transportnye Sistemy" and "Metrovagonmash" won a tender for delivery and 30-year maintenance of 300 cars 71–931 to Moscow during 2017–2019. The value of the contract was 56 billion rubles.

== Operation by cities ==
City	Number	Years of operation
Saint Petersburg	43 units	2014–present
Krasnodar	1 unit	2016–present
Moscow	390 units	2016–present

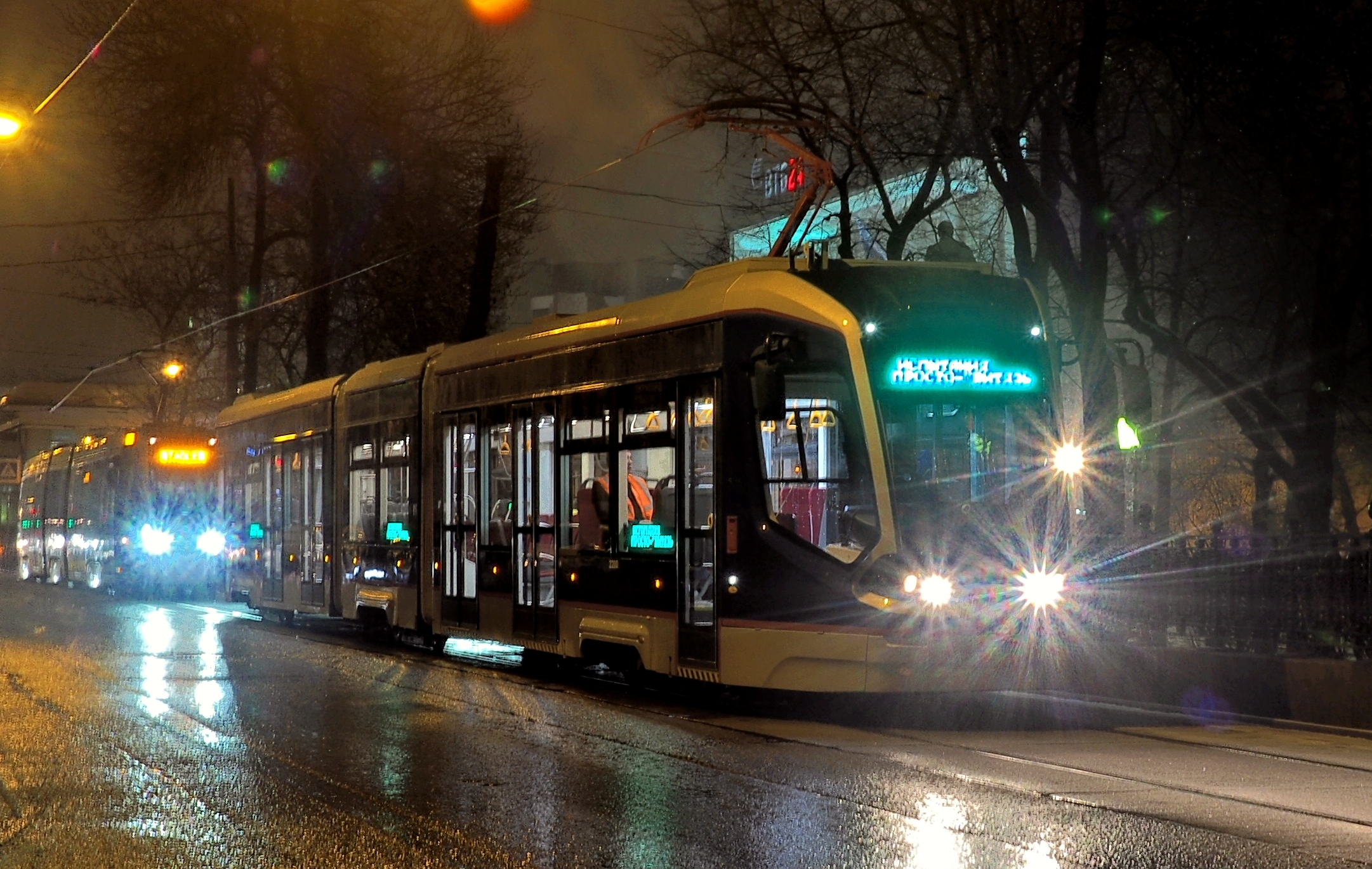
Tramcar 71-931 #2200 in Moscow

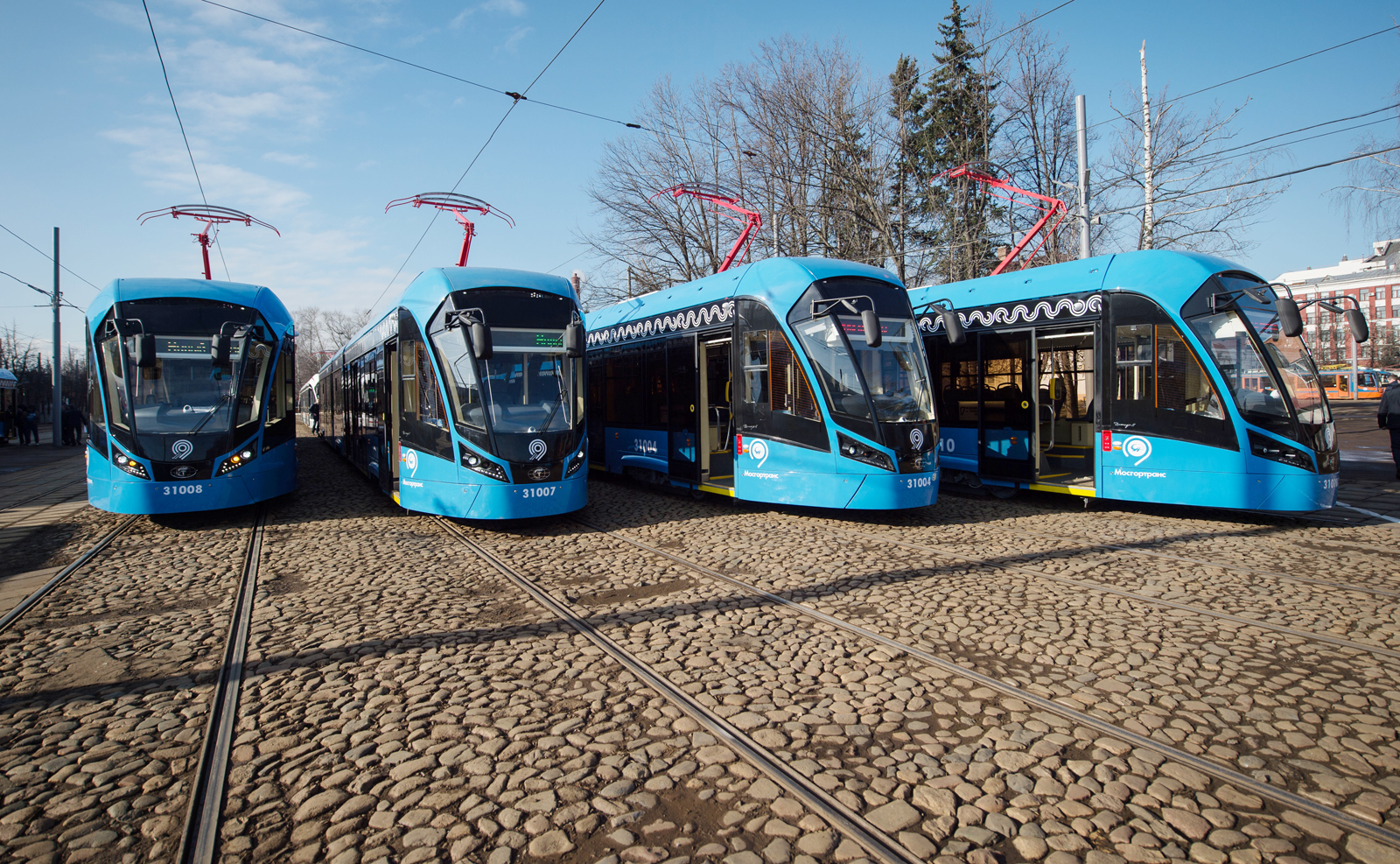
Tramcar 71-931M in Moscow

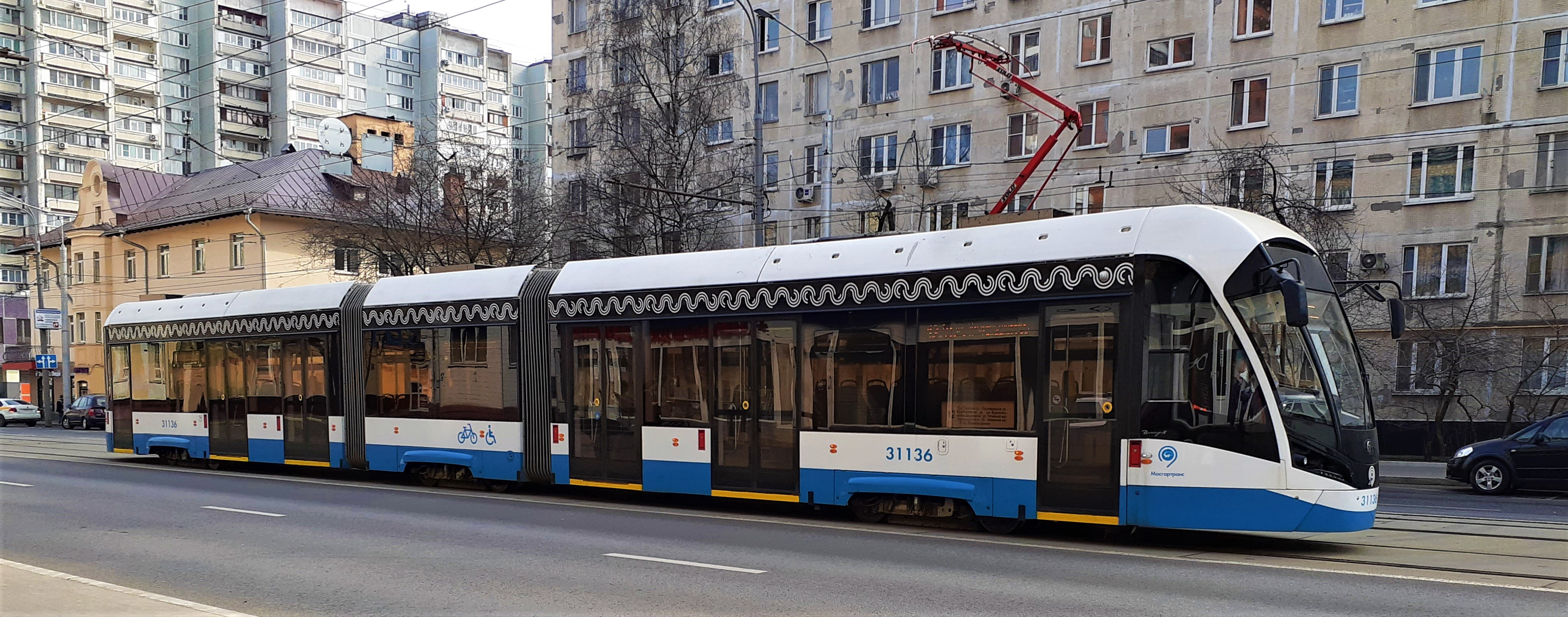
Tramcar 71-931M #31136 in Moscow

Tramcar 71-931 No. 201 in Krasnodar
