= Ivolga (train) =

EMU passenger train

Ivolga (EG2Tv/EGE2Tv)
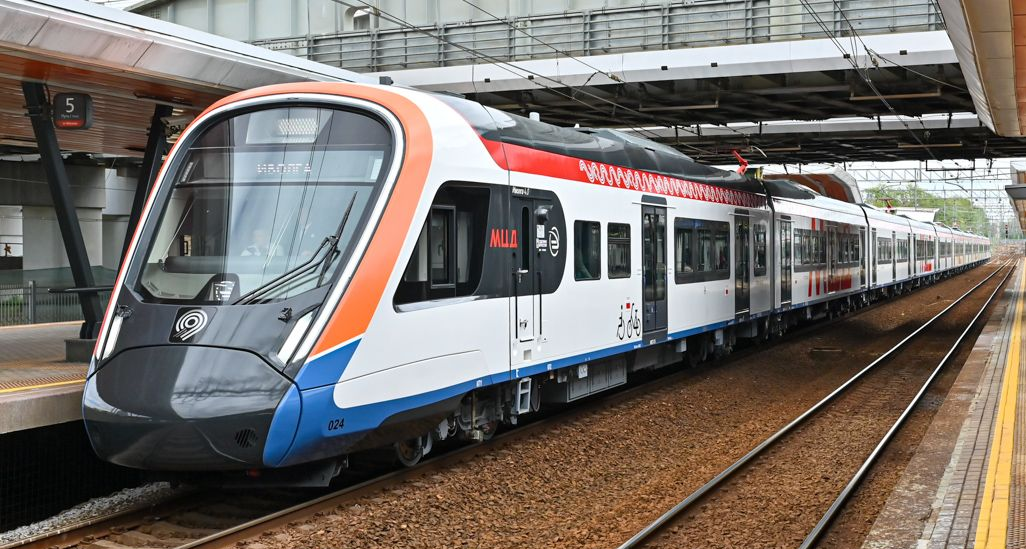
- Manufacturer: Transmashholding
- Built at: TVZ, Tver, Russia
- Constructed: 2014–present
- Entered service: 2017
- Number built: 1326 cars (122 trainsets)
- Capacity: 1638, incl. 222 seats (5-car, v. 0.0); 1916, incl. 328 seats (6-car, v. 1.0); 2267, incl. 396 seats (7-car, v. 2.0); 3671, incl. 668 seats (11-car, v. 1.0 and 2.0)

Specifications
- Car body construction: Stainless steel
- Train length: 116.0 m (380 ft 7 in) (5-car); 138.8 m (455 ft 5 in) (6-car); 161.6 m (530 ft 2 in) (7-car); 252.8 m (829 ft 5 in) (11-car)
- Car length: 23,800 mm (78 ft 1 in) (end cars); 22,800 mm (74 ft 10 in) (intermediate cars)
- Width: 3,480 mm (11 ft 5 in)
- Floor height: 1,320 mm (52 in)
- Doors: 2 per side; 1,400 mm (55 in) width
- Wheel diameter: 957 mm (37.7 in)
- Wheelbase: 17,600 mm (690 in) (full); 15,000 mm (590 in) (between bogie centers)
- Maximum speed: 120–160 km/h (75–99 mph)
- Weight: Ivolga 0.0: 55,500 kg (122,400 lb) (end cars); 49,300 kg (108,700 lb) (intermediate cars); 56,900 kg (125,400 lb) (intermediate motor cars); Ivolga 1.0: 55,930 kg (123,300 lb) (end cars); 50,580 kg (111,510 lb) (intermediate cars); 58,200 kg (128,300 lb) (intermediate motor cars); Ivolga 2.0: 57,100 kg (125,900 lb) (end cars); 51,100 kg (112,700 lb) (intermediate cars); 58,900 kg (129,900 lb) (intermediate motor cars)
- Traction system: ABB IGBT–VVVF
- Traction motors: 4 × 300 kW (400 hp)
- Power output: 2,400 kW (3,200 hp) (2 motor cars); 3,600 kW (4,800 hp) (3 motor cars); 6,000 kW (8,000 hp) (5 motor cars)
- Acceleration: 0.96 m/s^{2} (3.1 ft/s^{2})
- Electric system(s): 3 kV DC (nominal) from overhead catenary
- Current collection: Pantograph
- Track gauge: 1,520 mm (4 ft 11 27/32 in)

The Ivolga (named after "Иволга" bird, e.g. Eurasian golden oriole), designation EG2Tv and EGE2Tv, is an electric multiple unit passenger train produced and manufactured by Transmashholding at Tver Carriage Works (TVZ) for urban and commuter service.

== History ==
The exterior and interior styling, however, was outsourced: TVZ ordered the design of the concept train to Integral Design and Development (Arina Design) (Barcelona, Spain). A natural scale mock-up was built by Integral Design and Development and presented in Russia in 2015.

Re-styling of Ivolga was also outsourced to Integral Design and Development (Arina Design) in 2017. First Ivolga 2.0 trainset was built in 2019.

Since November 2019, an upgraded Ivolga 1.0 trains have been serving Line D1 of Moscow Central Diameters.

In 2021, yet another iteration of the design was presented, EGE2Tv, named Ivolga 3.0, with increased to 160 km/h max speed and meant for traveling longer distances. Whilst still utilizing the 2.0 exterior, the interior was updated by the Russian 2050.lab studio. They were meant for the D3 line of Moscow's MCD system planned opened in August 2023. The first trainset was completed in 2022.

The next modification, Ivolga 4.0, is an urban variant with 3 doors per middle car. A trainset with eleven cars has 646 seats. The first trainset was built in 2023.

Overall 41 EG2Tv and 81 EGE2Tv trains have been produced by February 2026, working on lines D1, D2 and D4 of MCD Moscow's metro-rail (high-capacity urban-rail) system as well as on express route Moscow – Usovo.

== Gallery ==
=== Exterior ===
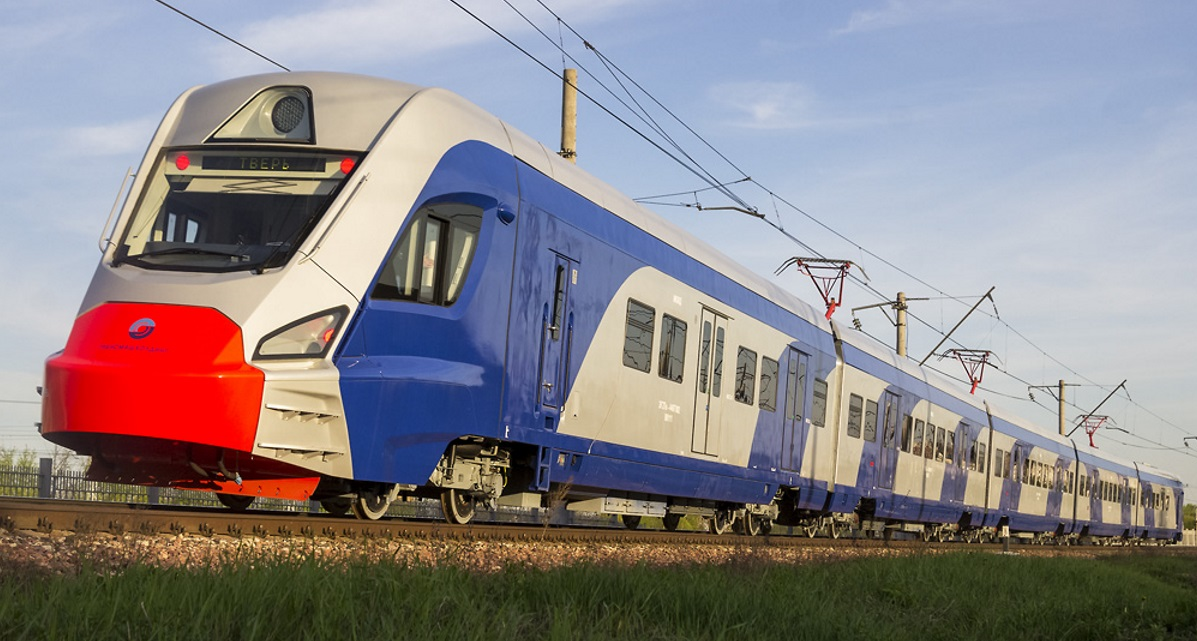
Ivolga 0.0 (EG2Tv) with original head

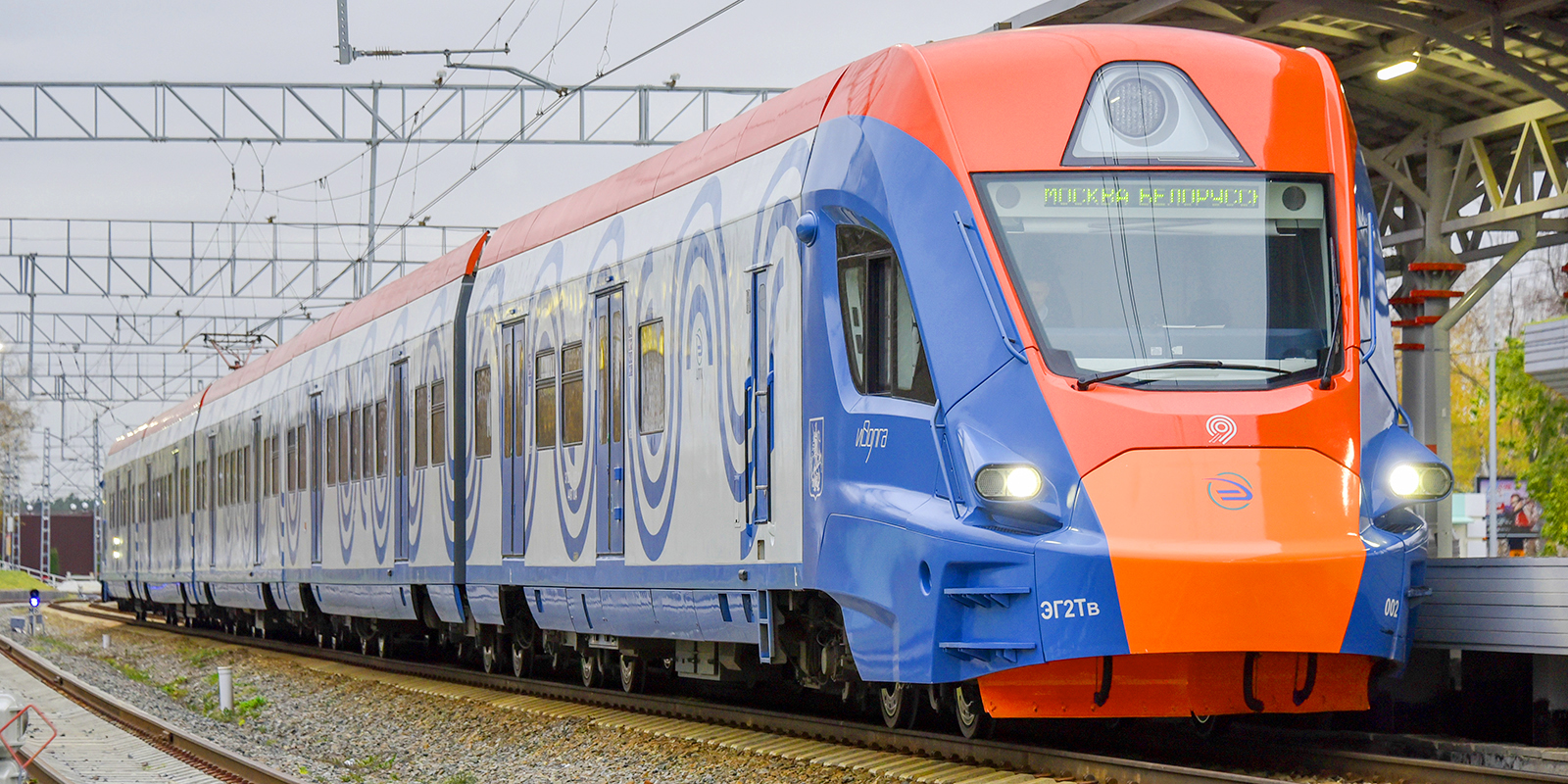
Ivolga 0.0 (EG2Tv) after modernization

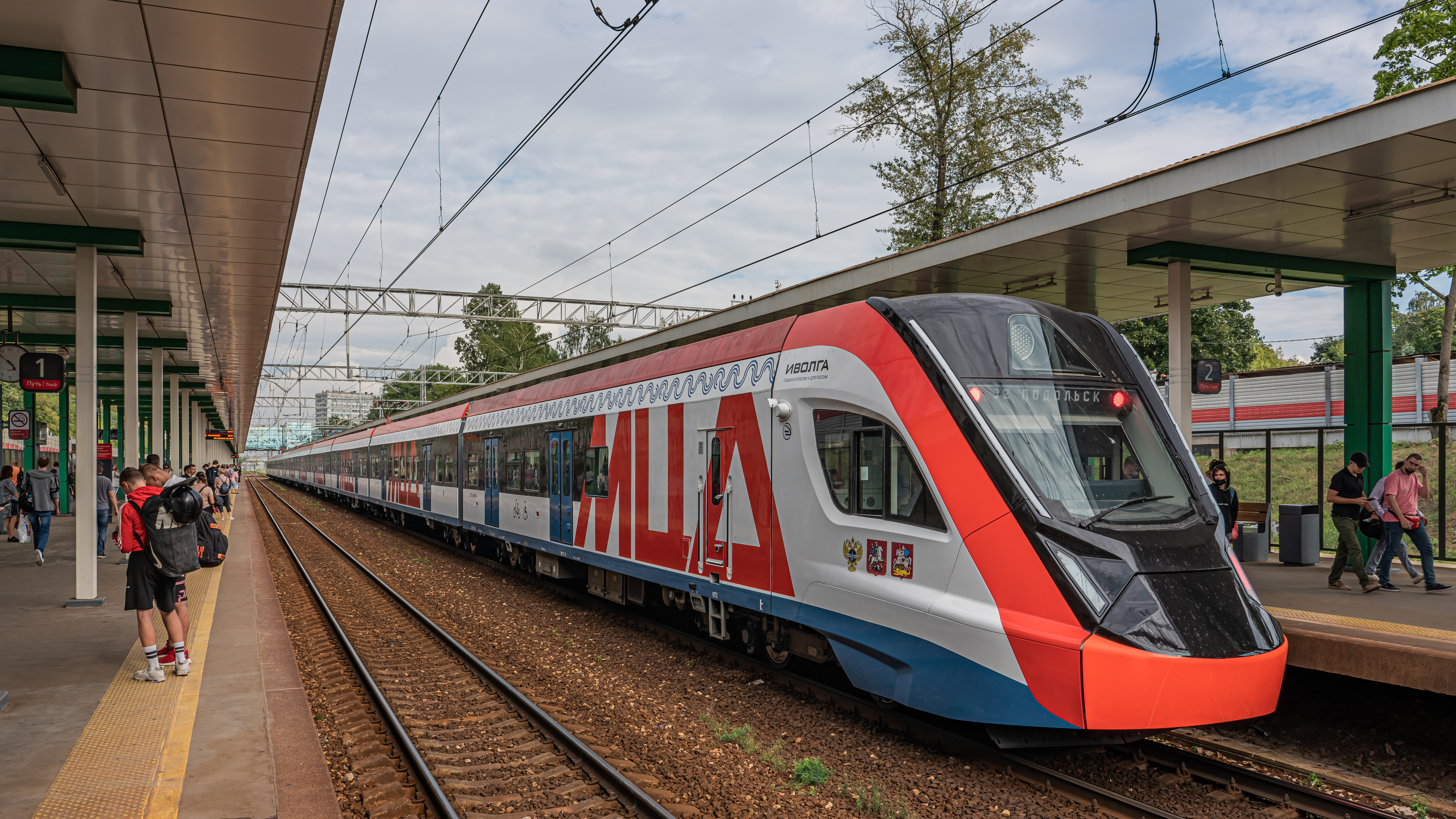
Ivolga 1.0 (EG2Tv)

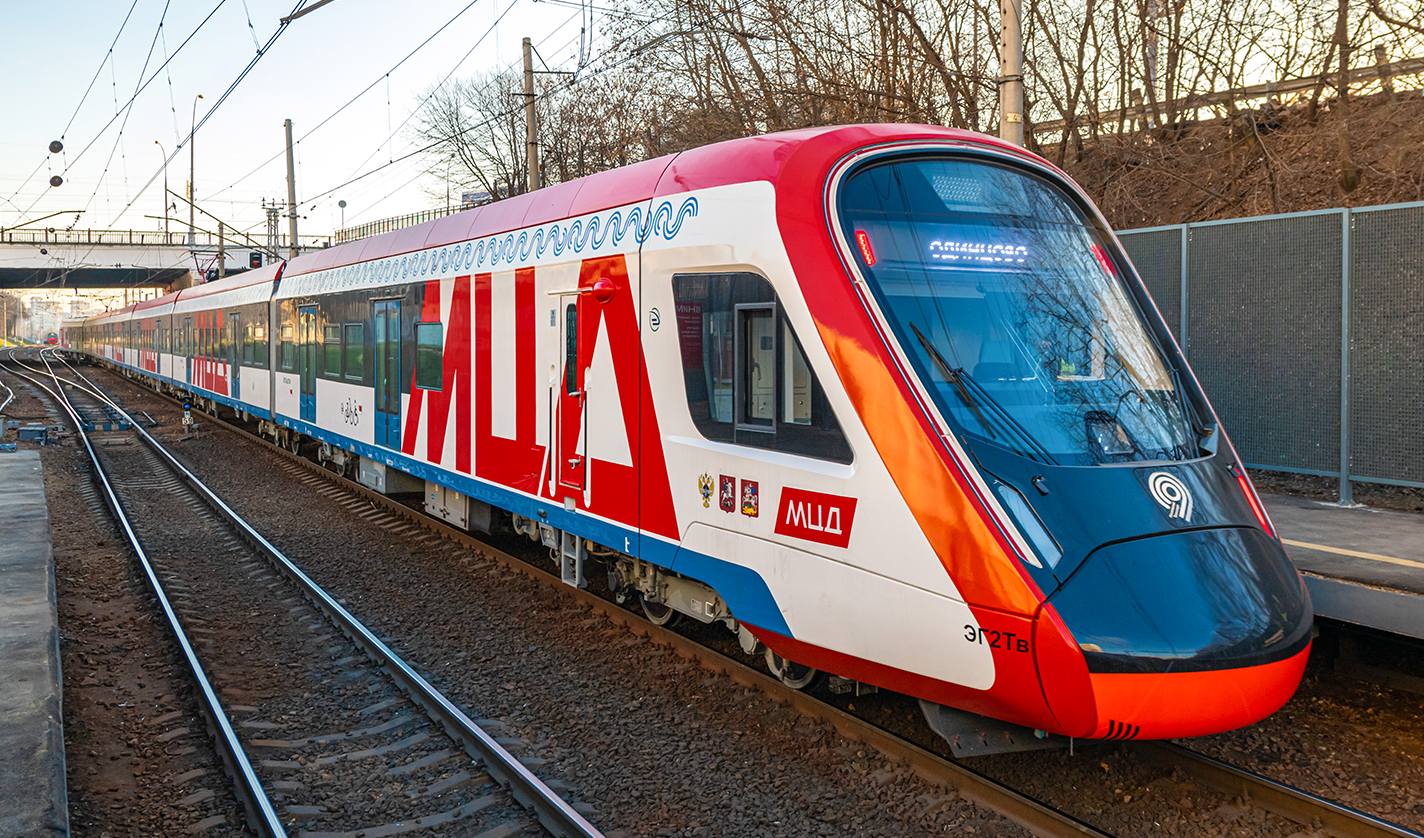
Ivolga 2.0 (EG2Tv)

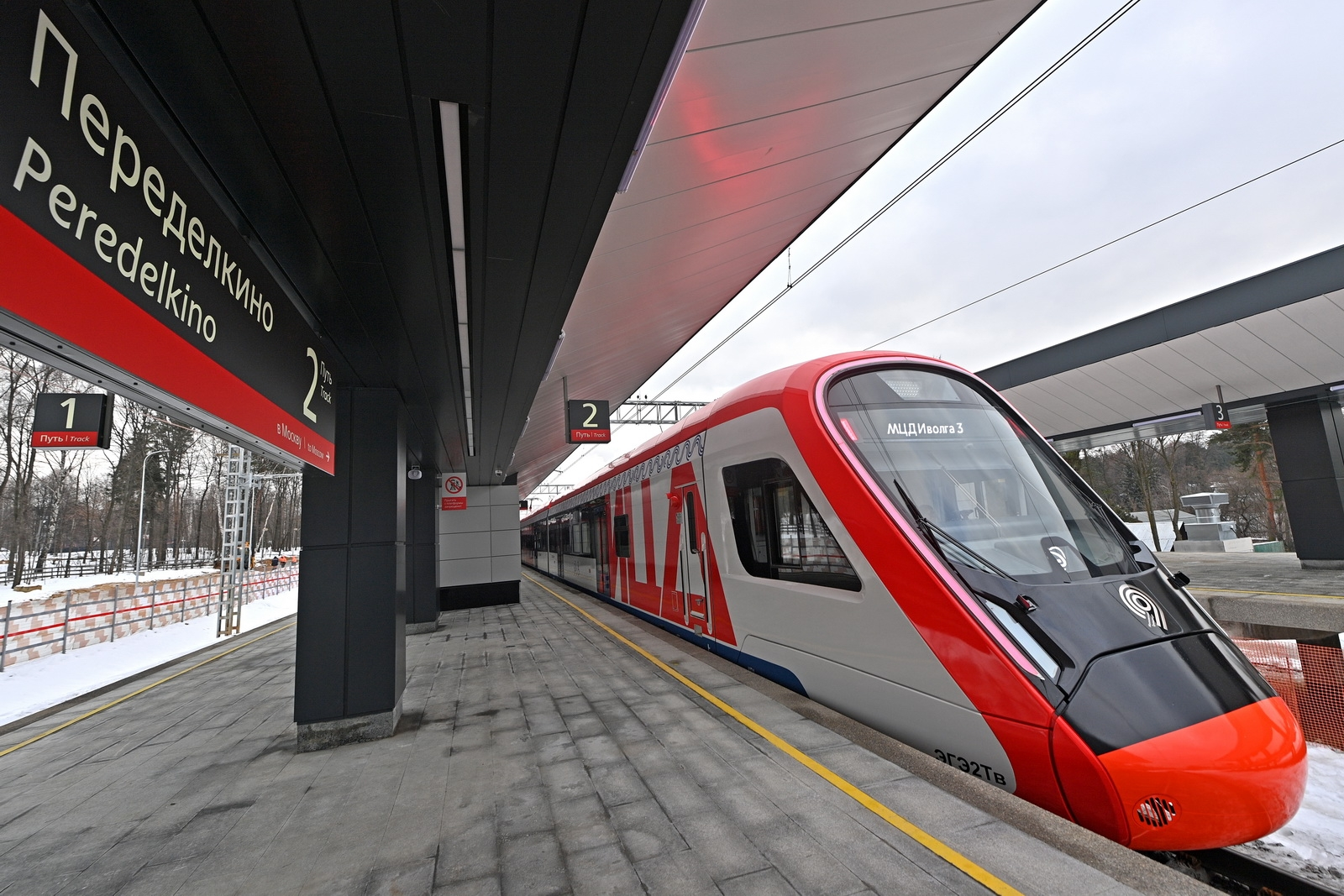
Ivolga 3.0 (EGE2Tv)

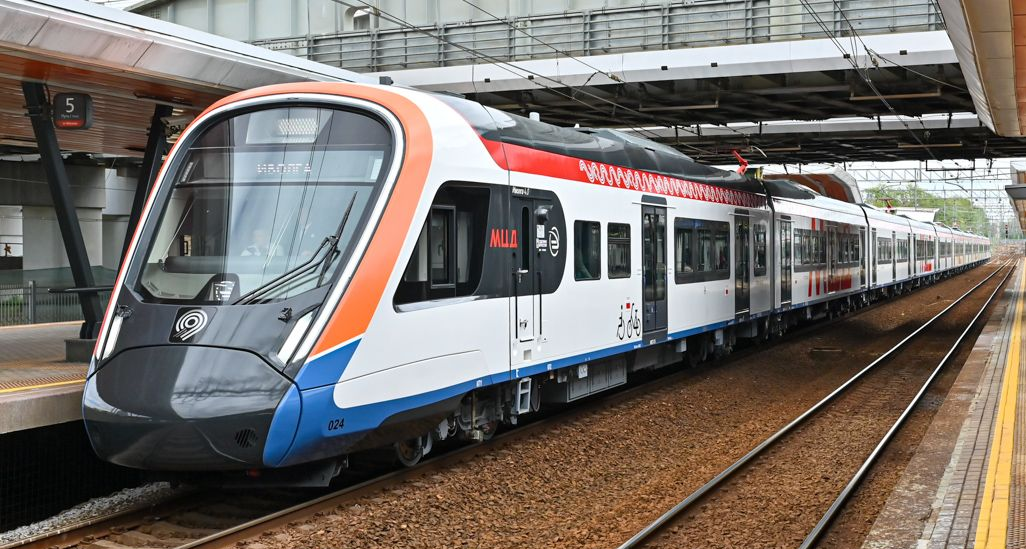
Ivolga 4.0 (EGE2Tv)

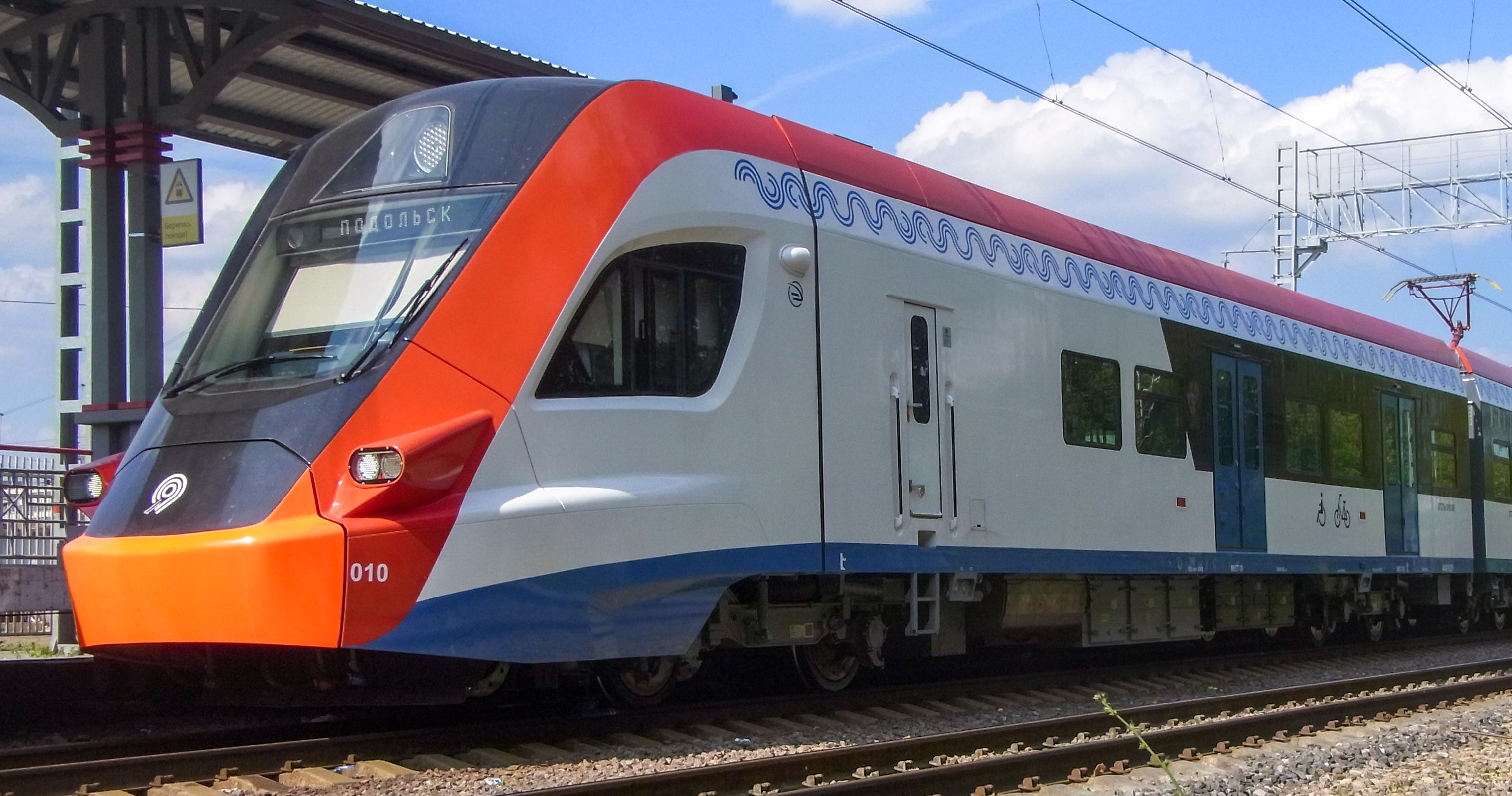
Ivolga 1.0, head car (model 62-4497)

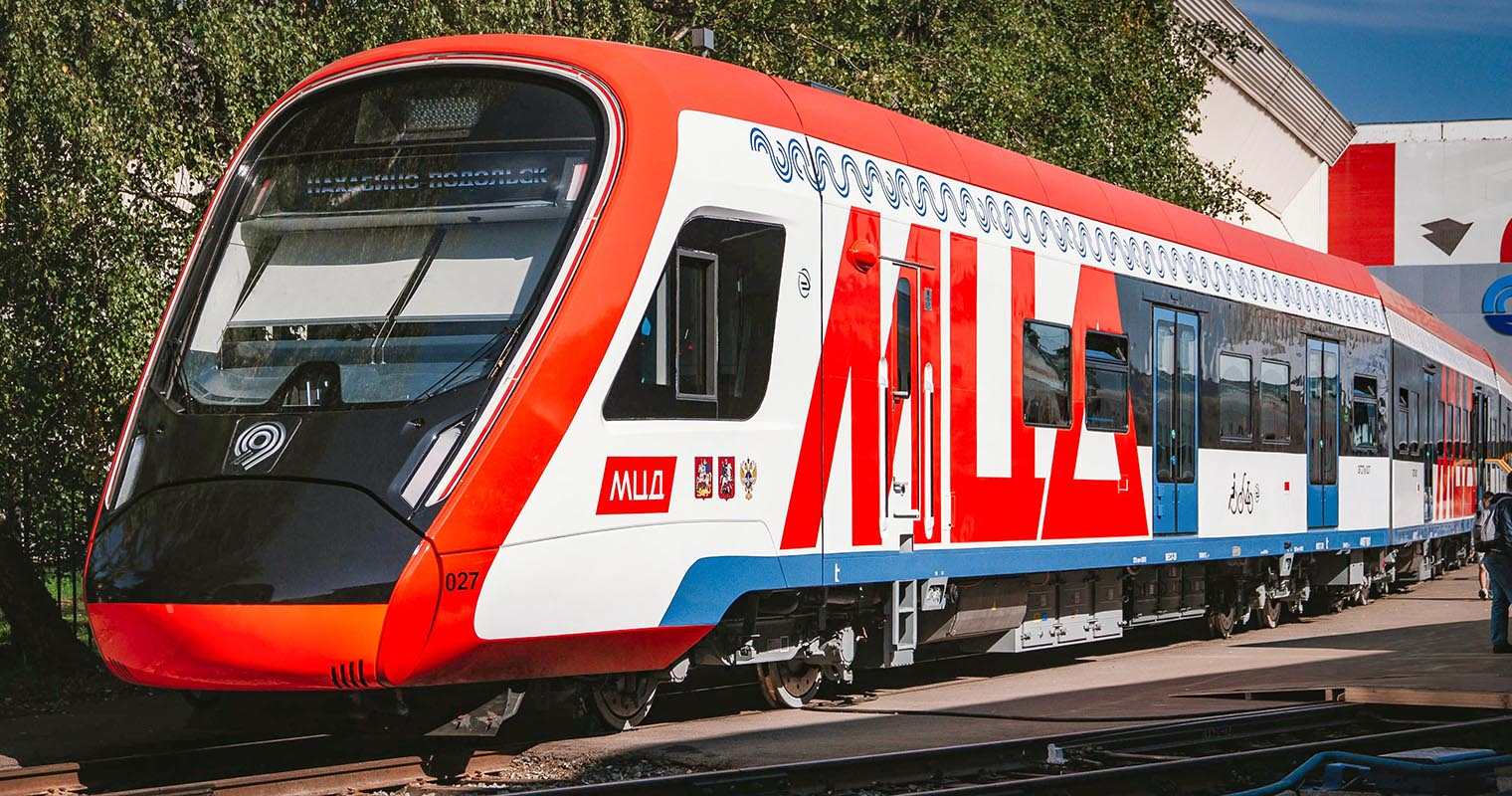
Ivolga 2.0, head car (model 62-4497)

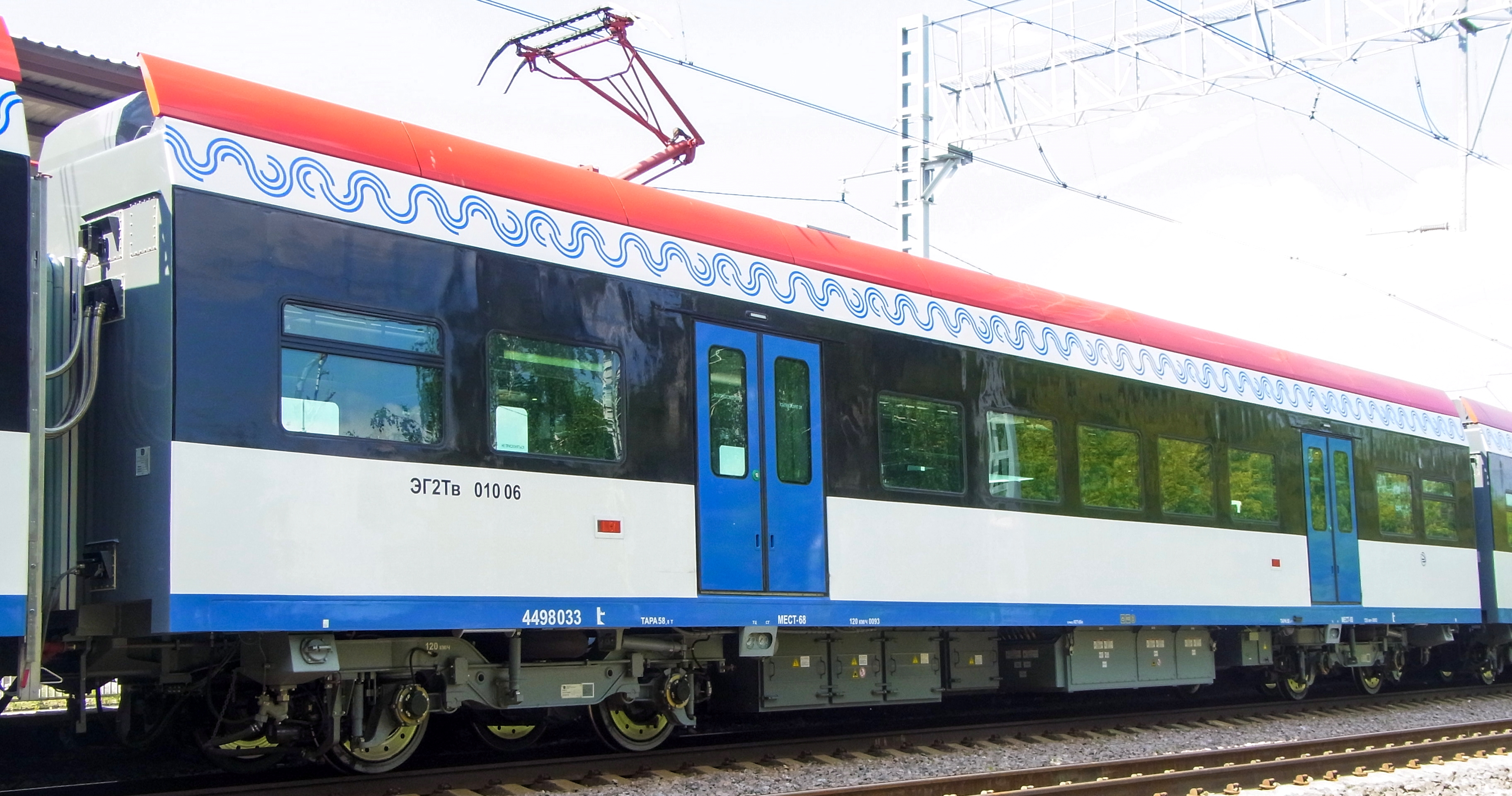
Ivolga 1.0, motor car (model 62-4498)

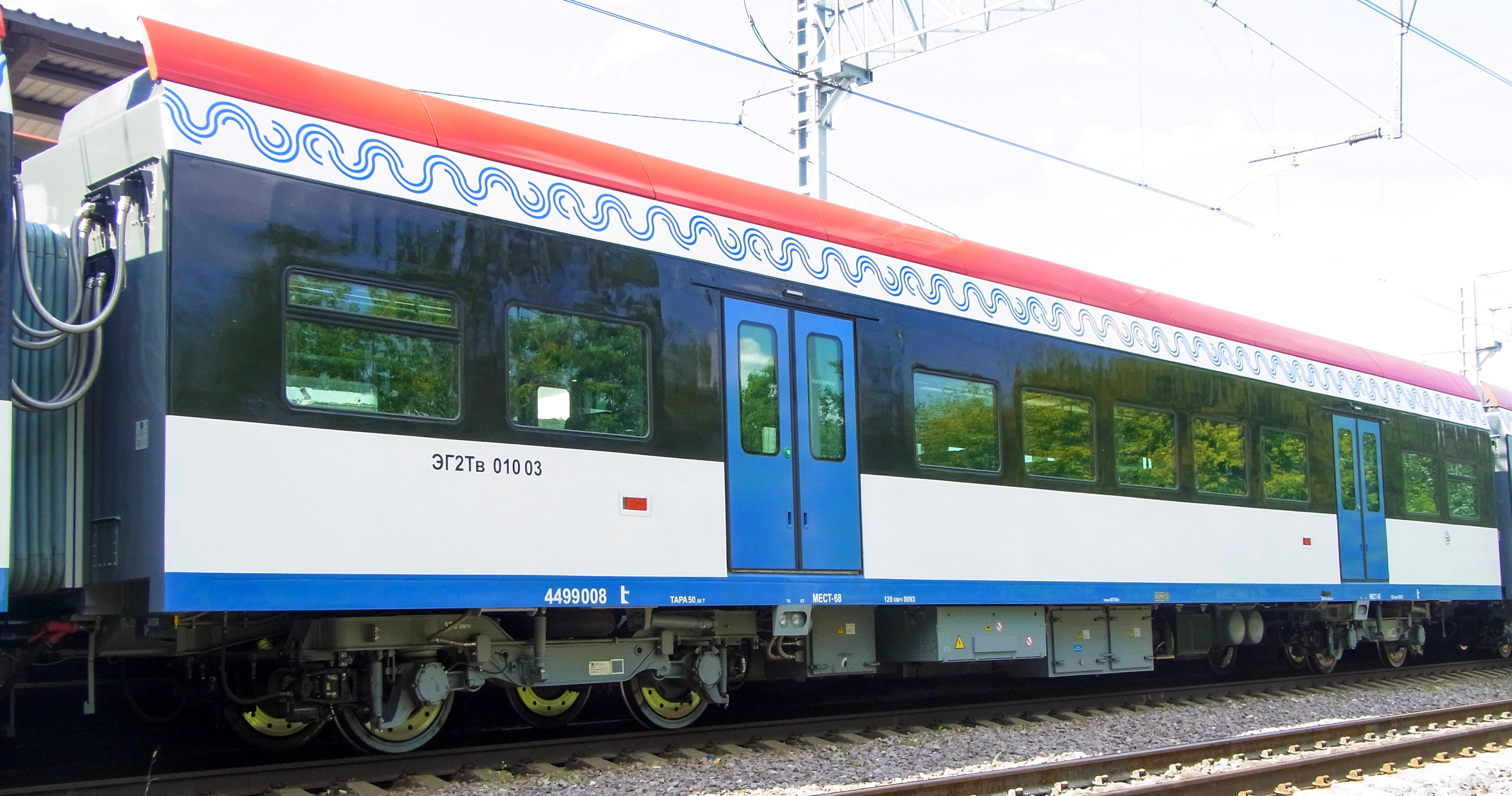
Ivolga 1.0, trailer car (model 62-4499)

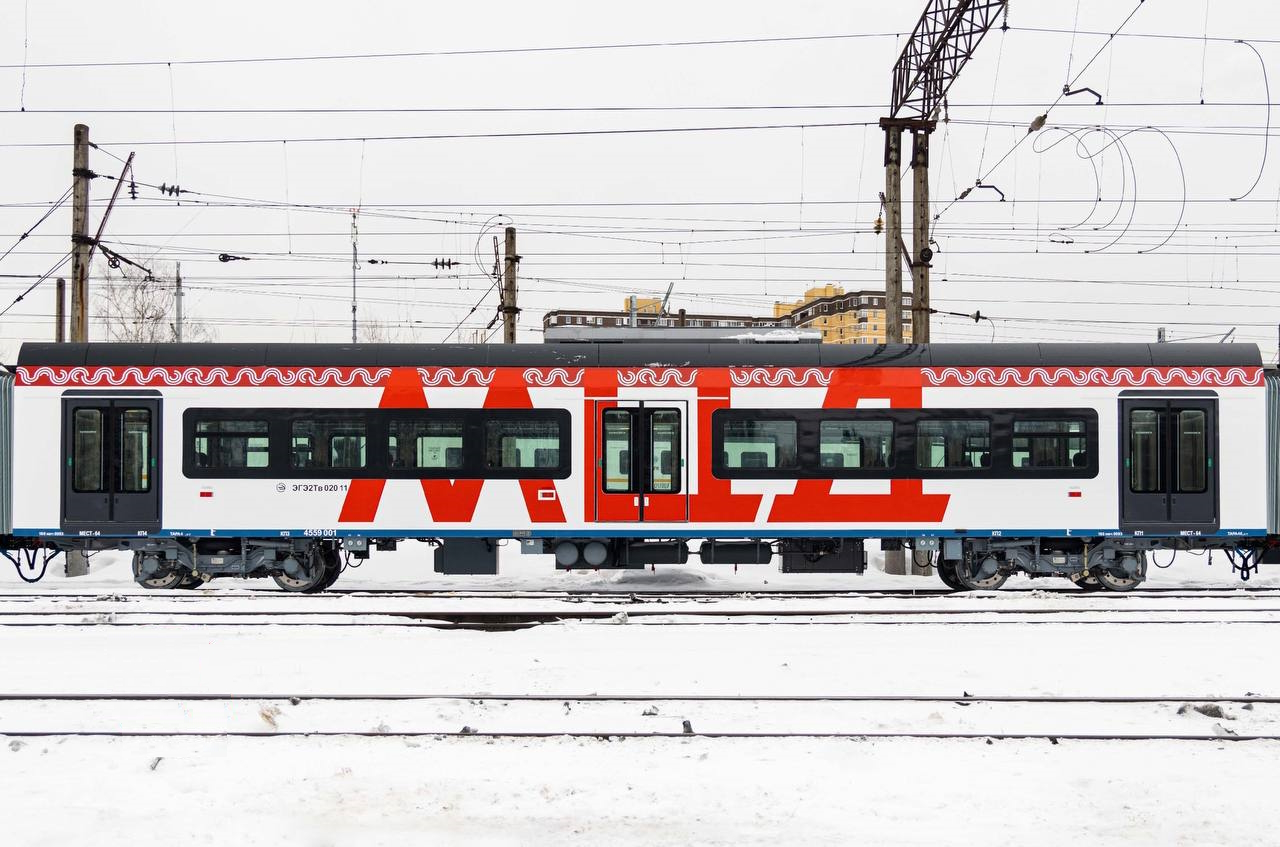
Ivolga 4.0, trailer car

=== Interior ===
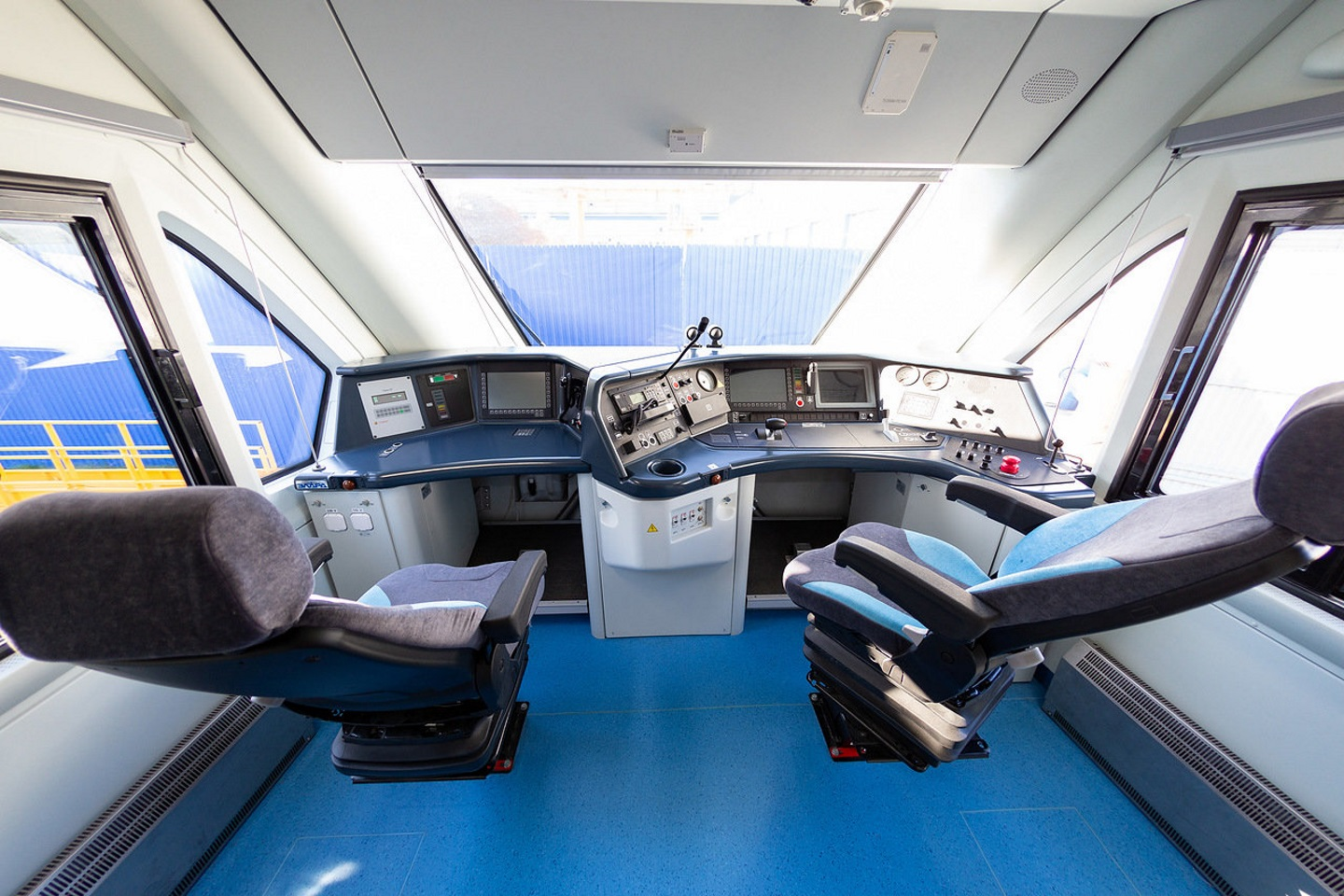
Driver cabin

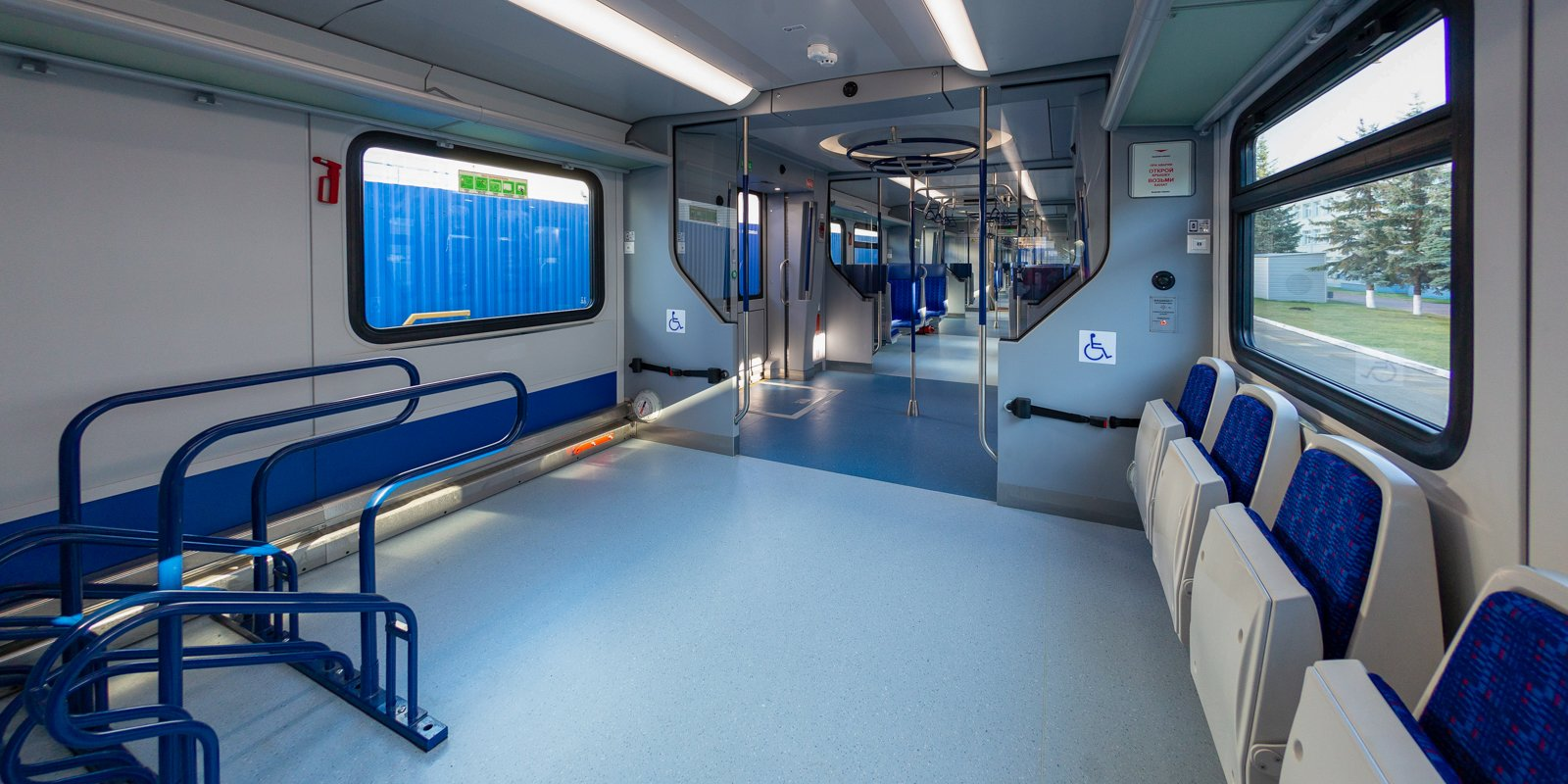
Designated areas for bikes/scooters and wheelchairs inside control car of Ivolga-1.0.

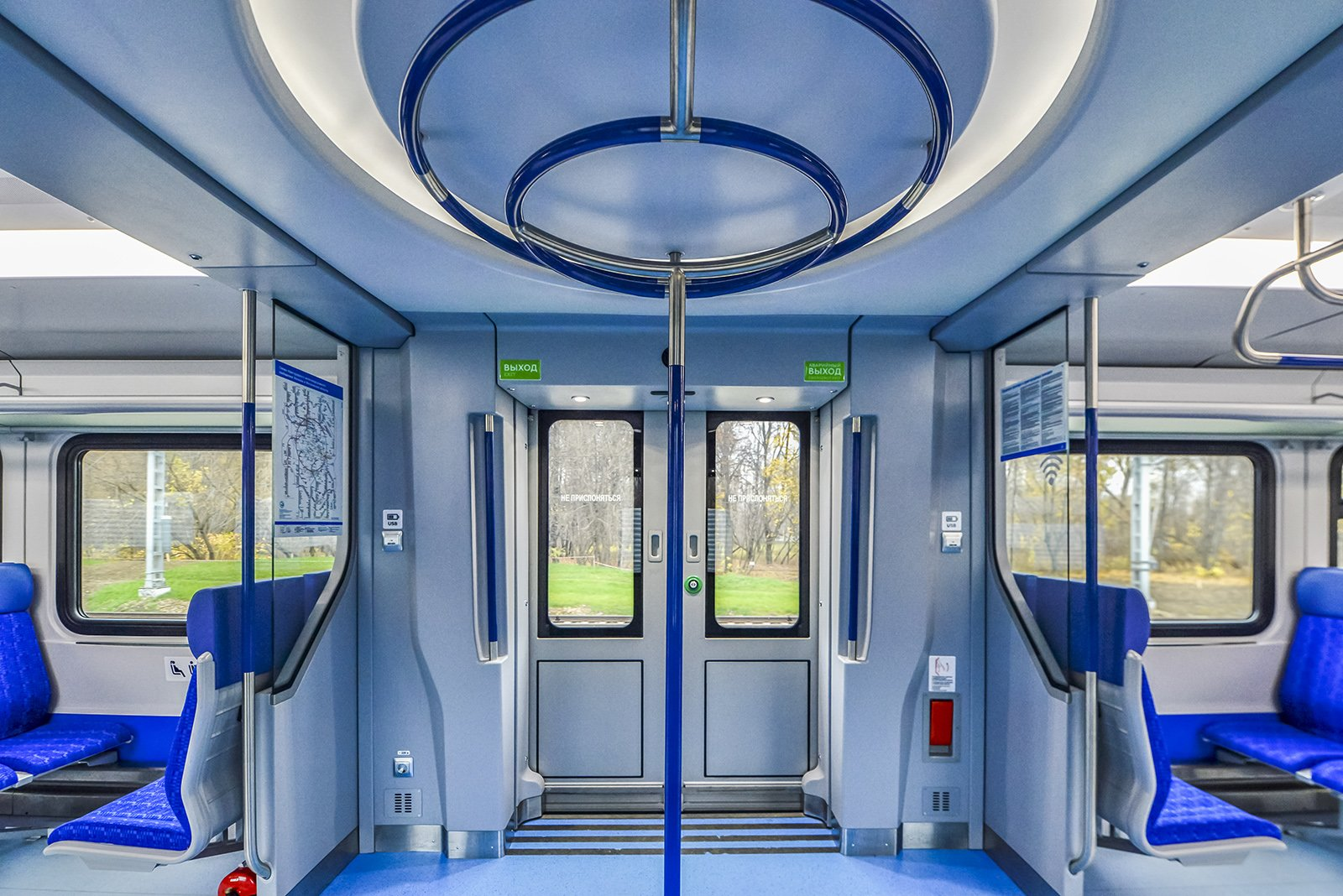
Passenger door zone inside Ivolga-1.0.

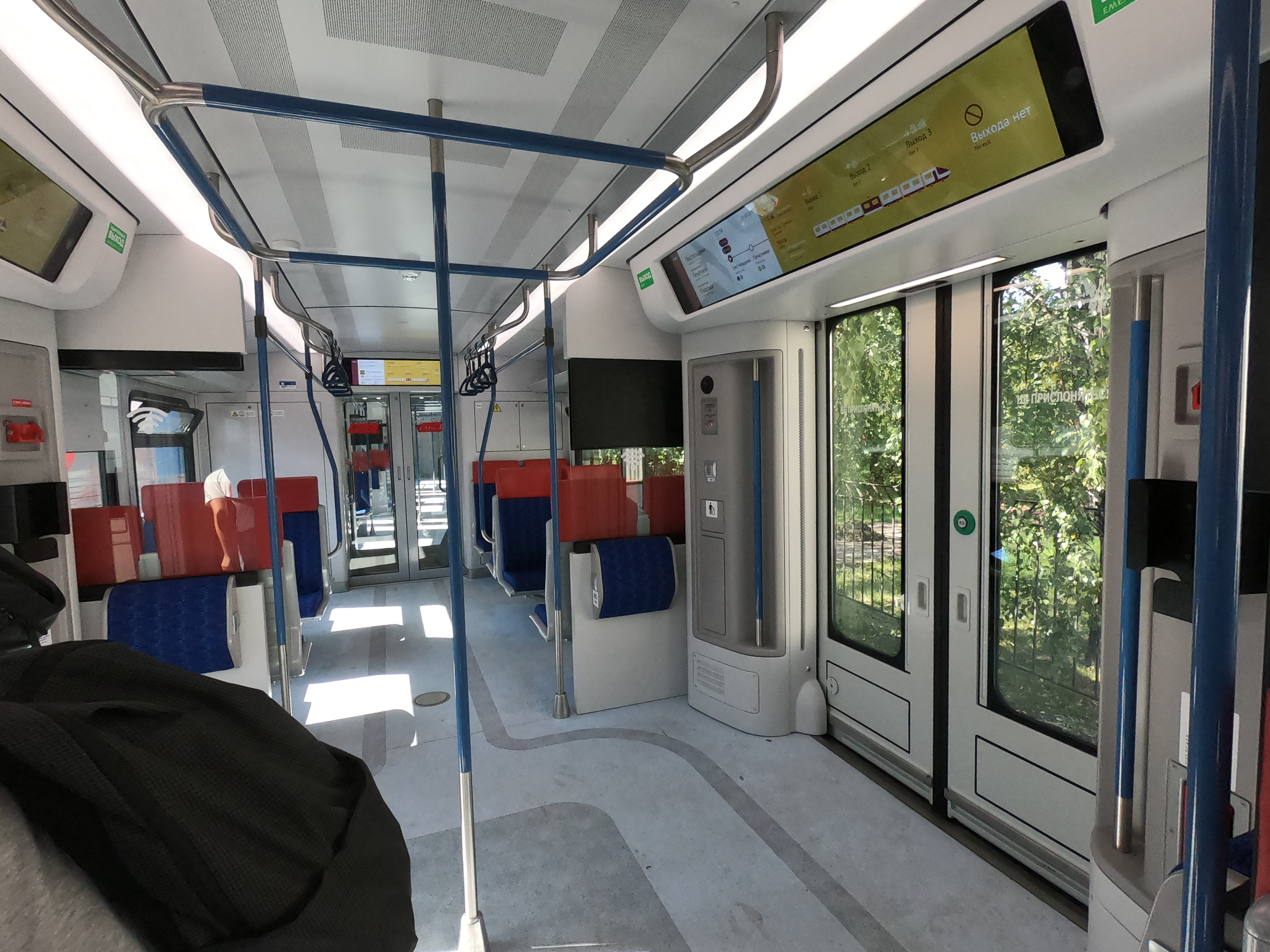
Passenger door zone inside Ivolga 2.0.

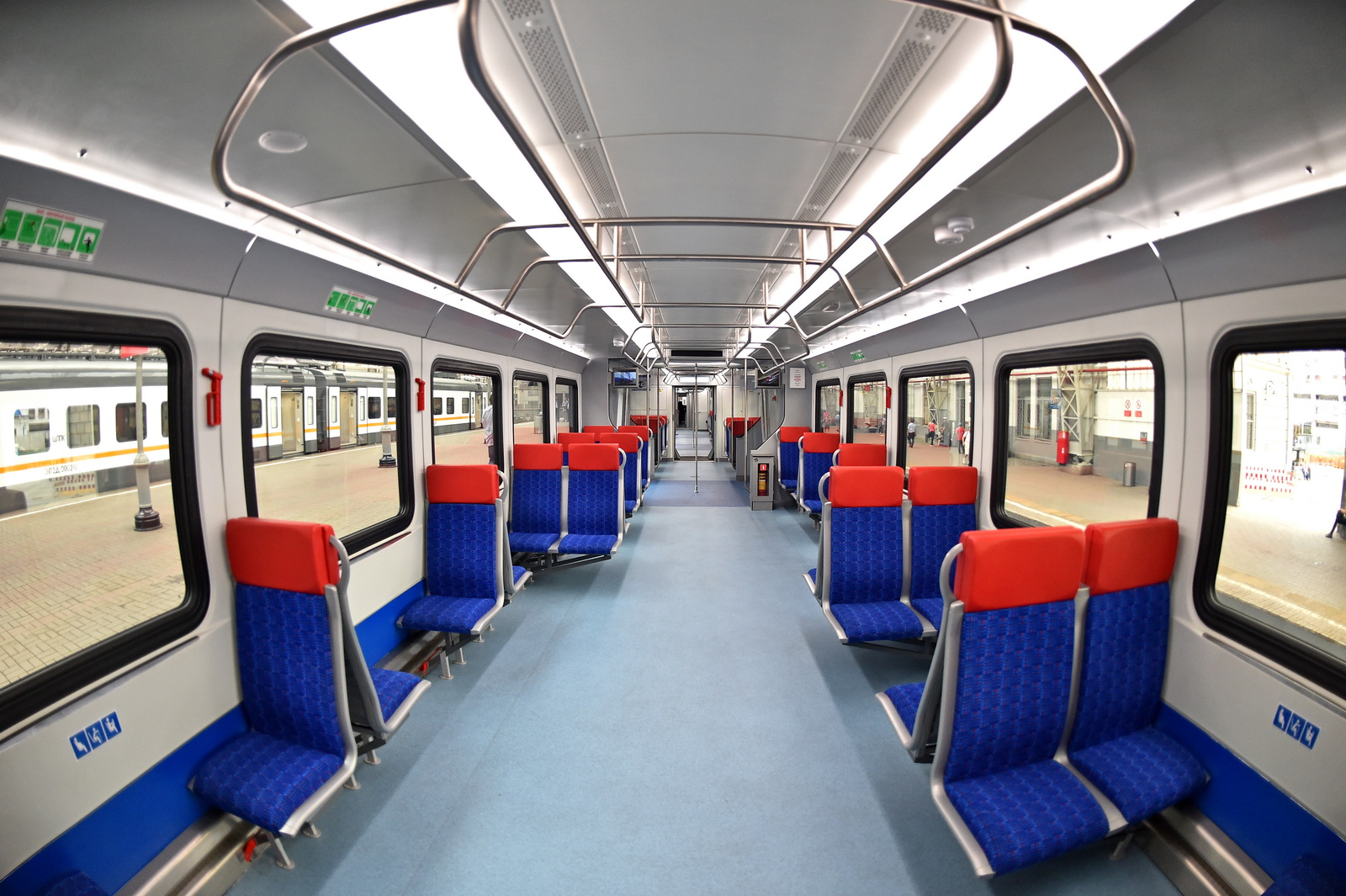
Passenger rows and seats inside intermediate car of Ivolga-0.0.

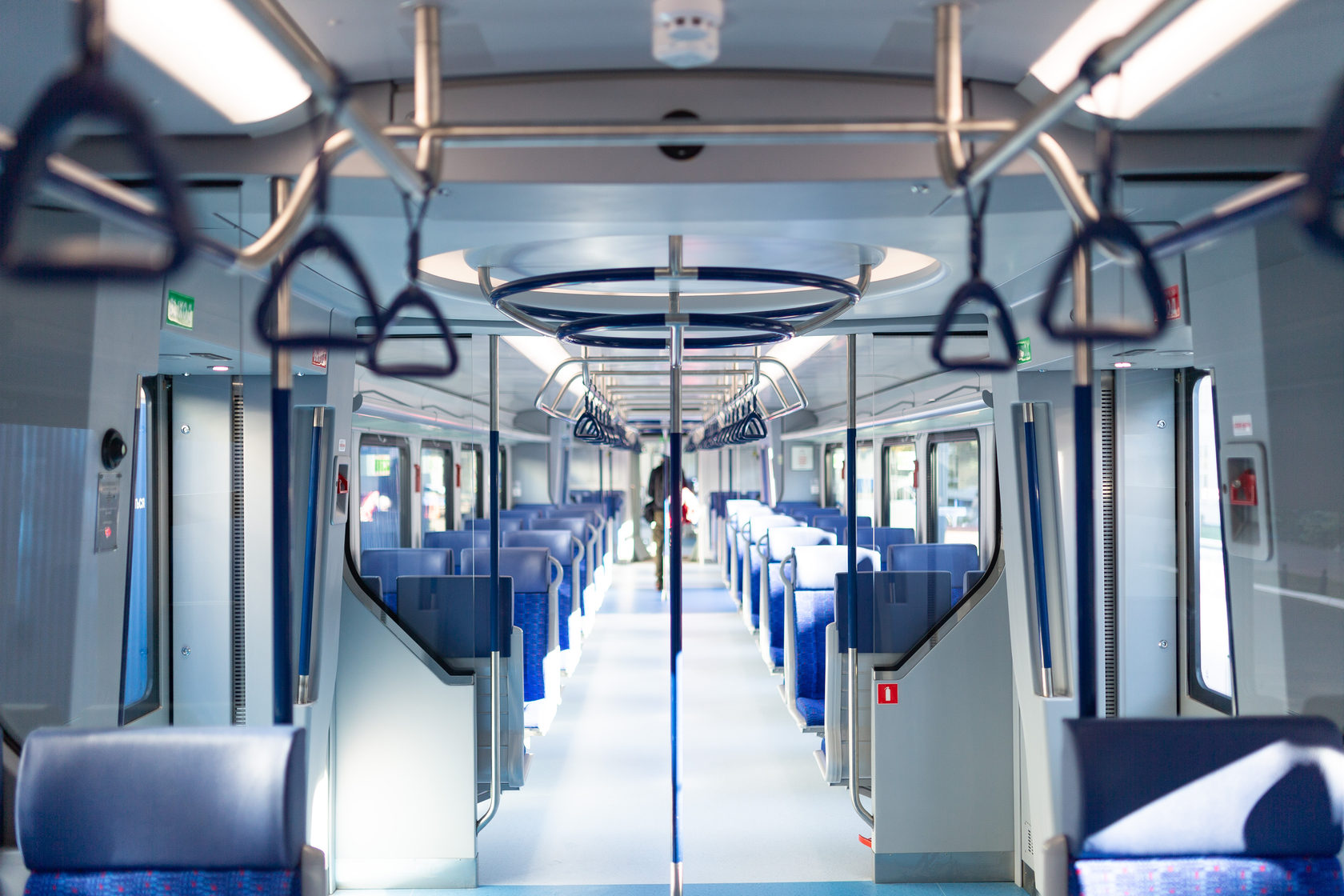
Passenger rows of seats inside intermediate car of Ivolga-1.0.

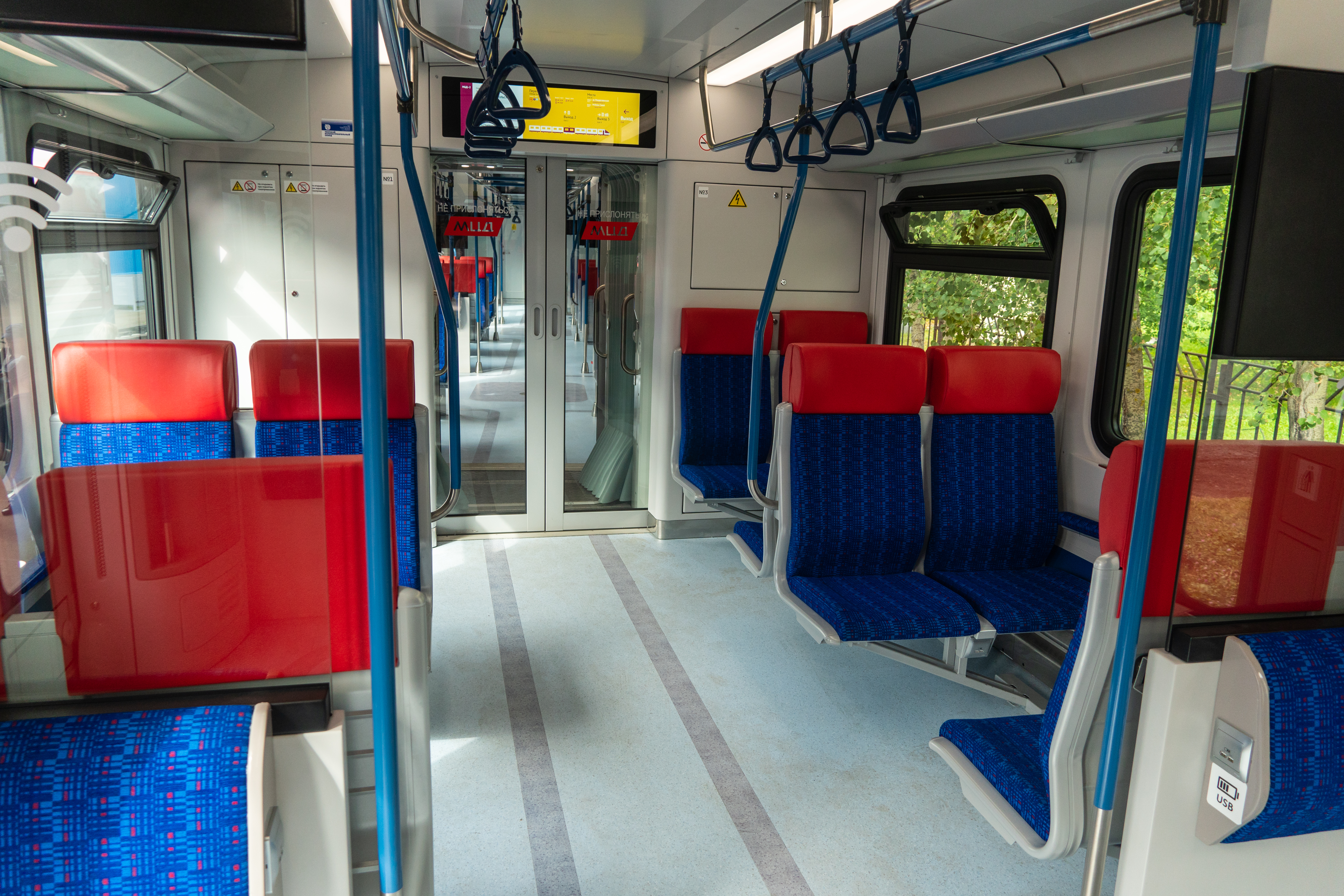
Passenger seats and gangway inside intermediate car of Ivolga-2.0.

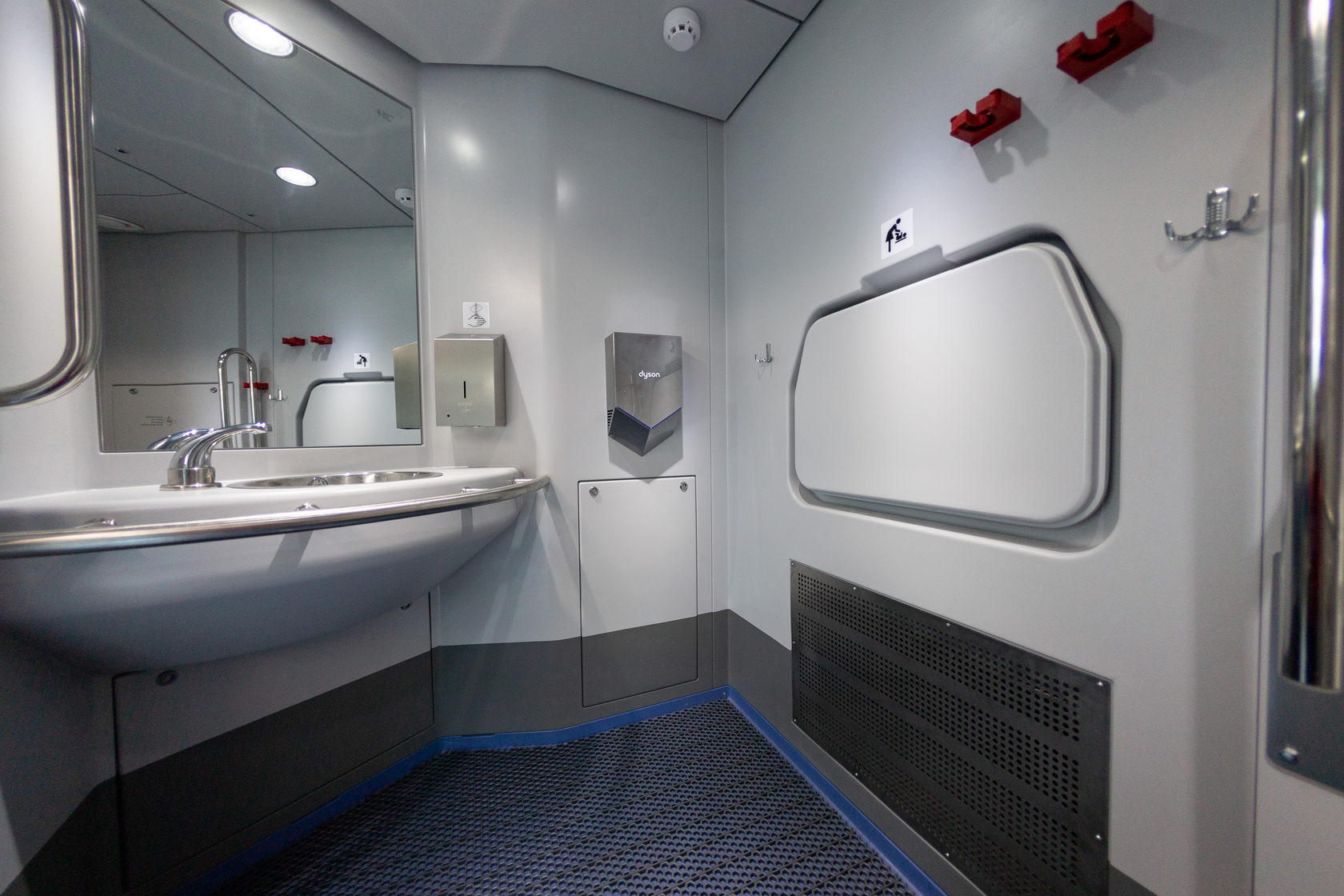
Toilet inside a control car.

== See also ==
- Siemens Desiro
- Stadler FLIRT
- Alstom Coradia
- CAF Civity
- Bombardier Talent/Bombardier Talent 2/CAF Talent 3
- Newag Impuls
- Pesa Elf
