= 71-911 =

Russian tram

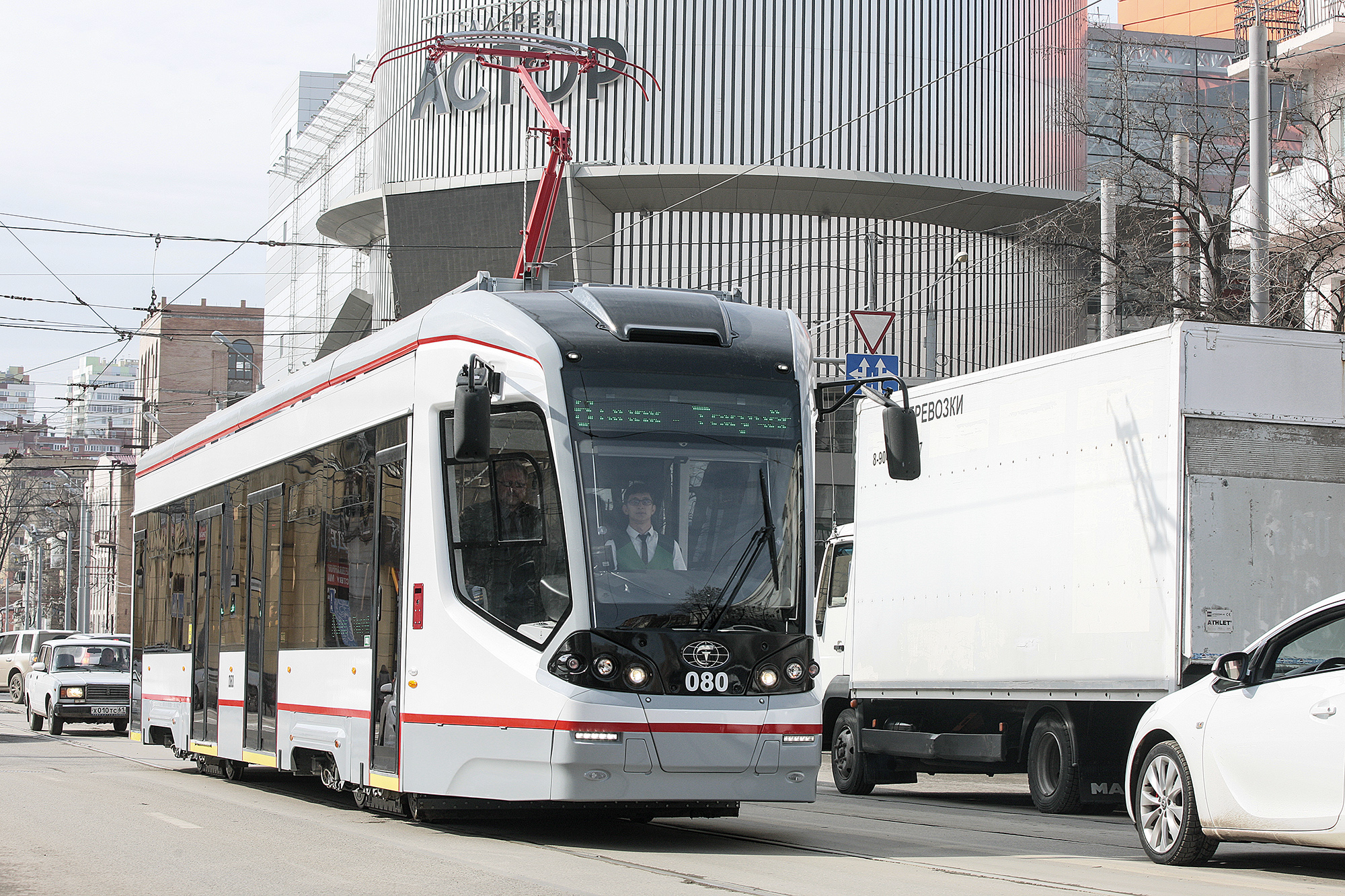
- "City Star" in Rostov-on-Don

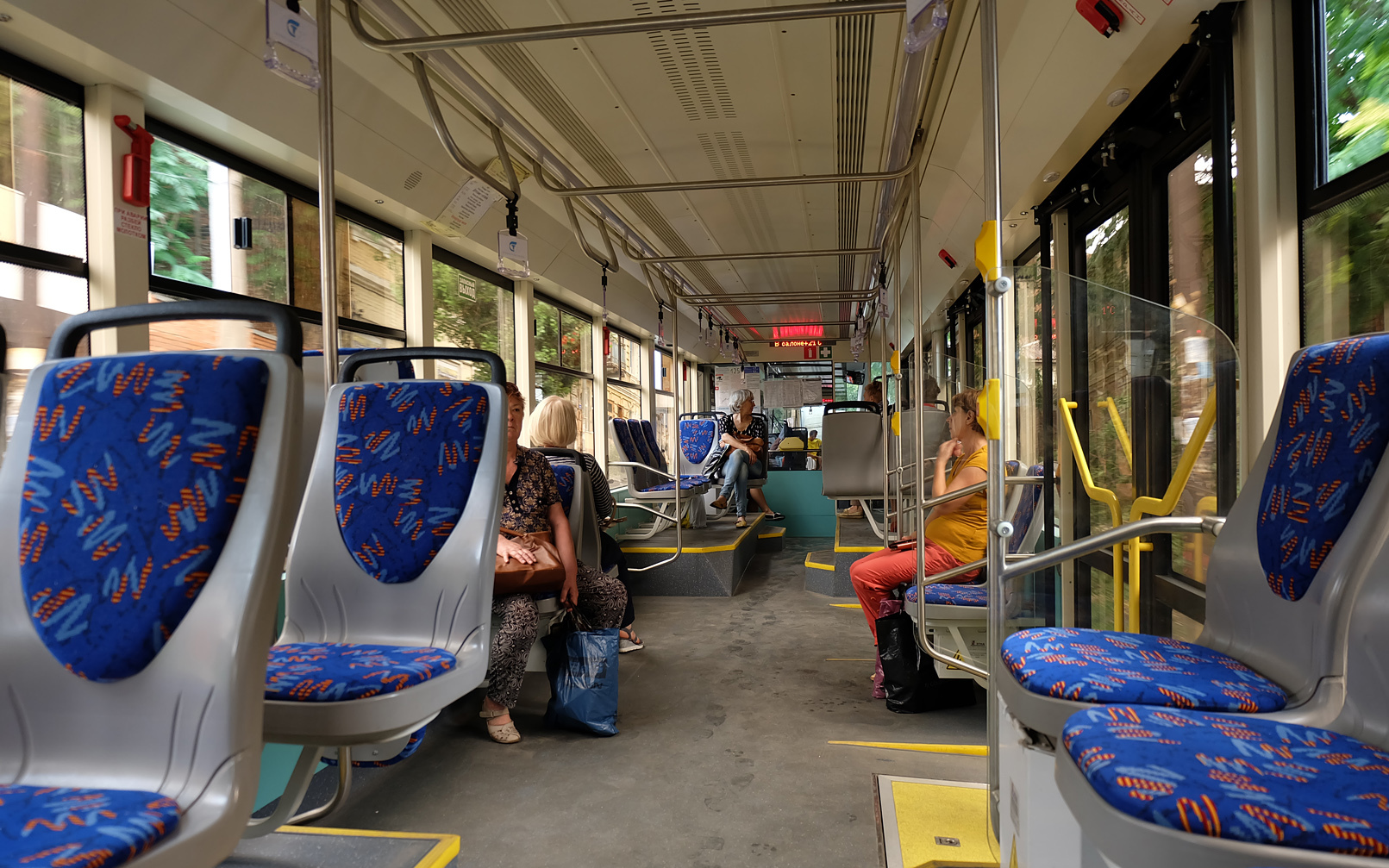
- Interior of 71-911E
- Manufacturer: PC Transport Systems Russia; Tverskoy Vagonostroitelniy Zavod Russia
- Constructed: 2014-OT
- Number built: 158
- Capacity: 33 seats/119 standing

Specifications
- Train length: 16,400 mm (53 ft 10 in)
- Width: 2,500 mm (8 ft 2 in)
- Height: 3,500 mm (11 ft 6 in)
- Doors: 4
- Articulated sections: 1
- Maximum speed: 75
- Power supply: 550 V
- Current collector(s): Pantograph
- AAR wheel arrangement: Bo-Bo
- Bogies: 2
- Braking system(s): Electric, disc, magnetic
- Track gauge: 1,524 mm (5 ft)

71-911 "City Star"/71-911E/71-911ЕМ «Lionet» is a family of Russian four-axle four-door single-sided trams with a completely low level floor, created by LLC "PC Transport Systems" at the facilities of Tver Carriage Works and other factories.

The first 100% low-floor tram car in the CIS. It is an analogue of planned 71-625 tram of Ust-Katav Wagon-Building Plant.

== Operation by cities ==
As of 2020, the City Star trams are operated in the following cities:

City	Number	Years of operation
Rostov-on-Don	30 units	2016–present
Tver	8 units	2014–2017
Moscow	39 unit	2018–present
Daugavpils	8 units	2020–present
Kazan	5 units	2019–present
Ulan-Ude	15 units	2019–present
Perm	8 units	2019–present
Ulyanovsk	29 units	2020–present

=== Modifications ===
- 71-911 — track gauge 1524 mm
- 71-911E — Track gauge 1435 mm
- 71-911ЕМ «Lionet» — track gauge 1524 mm, updated

== Participation in exhibitions ==
- Innoprom. July 9–12, 2014. (Ekaterinburg).
- ExpoCityTrans. October 29 – November 1, 2014. (Moscow)
