= PC Transport Systems =

Russian electric vehicle manufacturer

PC Transport systems LLC
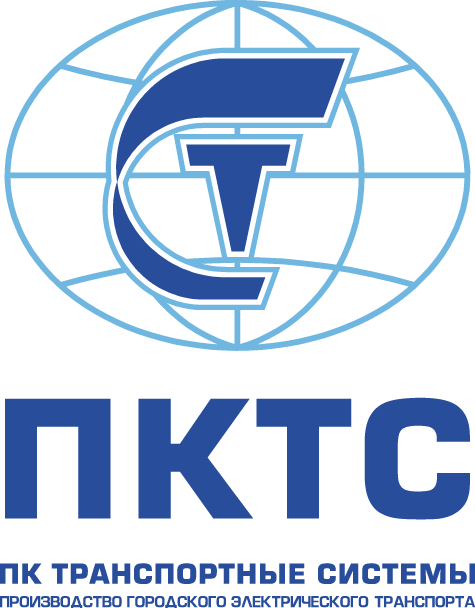
- Native name: ООО «ПК Транспортные системы»
- Type: Private limited company
- Industry: Mechanical engineering
- Founded: 2013
- Headquarters: Moscow, Russia
- Products: Trams, trolleybuses, electric buses
- Website: pk-ts.org

PC Transport Systems LLC (PC TS) is a Russian company specializing in the production of urban electric vehicles: trams, trolleybuses and electric buses.

== History ==
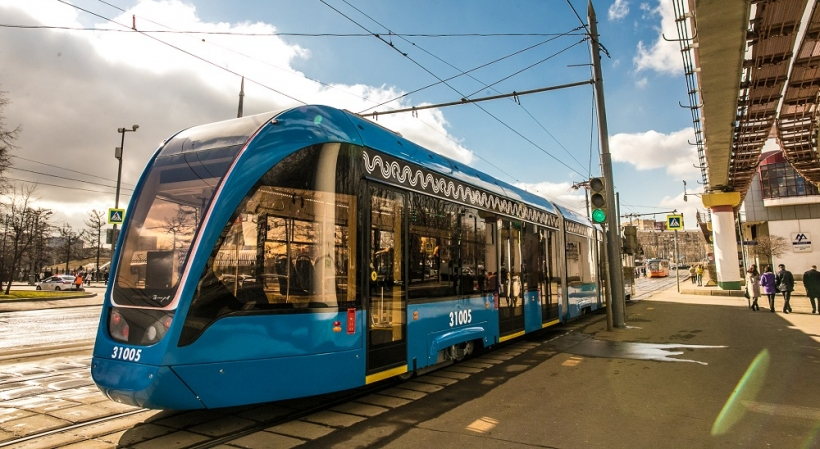
71-931

The company was founded by Felix Vinokur in 2013, after leaving the founders of the Trading house Ust-Katav Wagon-Building Plant LLC. In 2014, on the basis of the Vinokur's company developments at the leased facilities of the Tver Carriage Works launched the production of the 71-911 "City Star" tram and later the "Vityaz" tram, which received a certificate for industrial production in 2015.

In April 2017, the company's management announced their availability to take over the Tver tram system as a concession, promising to invest 6 billion rubles in the development of the Tver tram to continue to support it for over ten years. In early 2018, the company began construction of a factory for the production of aluminum carriages for trams at the Tver Mechanical Factory Plant of Electric Transport, a separate structural department of the PC TS. The cost of the new factory, according to 2019's data, was one billion rubles. In 2020, the factory started production of a tram with an aluminum alloy carriage. However, the Tver tramway system closed in November 2018.

In March 2018, Felix Vinokur signed an agreement with the leaders of Saratov and Saratov Oblast on modernizing tram traffic and establishing high-speed tram lines in Saratov.

In May 2018, the company moved the assembly of tram carriages from Tver to Saint Petersburg, establishing a separate structural department - "Nevsky Factory Plant of Electric Transport" and leasing the Oktyabrsky electric car repair factory. PC TS leased the factory on Sedov street for 1 billion 183.36 million rubles. In November 2018, the management of PC Transport systems suggested to make a 30-year concession agreement to make a medium-capacity rail system in Novokuznetsk for 10 billion rubles.

In December 2019, the company leased part of the territory of the former Trolza factory in Engels, where a separate structural department of PC Transport systems, the Engels factory Plant of Electric Transport, began functioning. The payment of 11 months' rent allowed Trolza to pay off their salary debts to their employees.

PC Transport systems invested 300 million rubles in the Engels factory. At the same time, the Engels plant began mass production of low-floor trolleybuses "Admiral" with increased off-wire travel.

== Vehicles ==
PC Transport Systems takes part in the development, production and sale of trams, trolleybuses and electric buses. The produced transport operates in Moscow, Saint Petersburg, Krasnodar, Rostov-on-don, Daugavpils, Ulan-Ude, Kazan and Perm.

Since 2014, single-section trams 71-911 City Star and 71-911EM Lionet, two-section 71-923 Bogatyr, 71-923M Bogatyr-M, three-section 71-922 Varyag, 71-931 Vityaz, 71-931M Vityaz-M and 71-934 Lion have been serially produced at the company's facilities.

The company also produces an electric bus Pioneer and a low-floor trolleybus Admiral-6281with increased autonomous travel. In 2020 production of the Admiral 2020 trolleybus began.

=== Trolleybuses and electric buses ===
| Name | Start of release | Number built | Length (mm) | Width (mm) | Seats | Passenger capacity | Photo | Notes |
|---|---|---|---|---|---|---|---|---|
| Pioneer-6218 | 2018 | 1 | 11 715 | 2500 | 29 | 85 | | |
| Pioneer-6245 | 2021 | 1 | | | | | | Burnt down due to battery fire |
| PKTS-6281.00 'Admiral' | 2015 | 202 | 12 920 | 2500 | 25 | 100 | | |
| PKTS-6281.01 'Admiral' (Admiral 2020) | 2019 | 27 | 12 375 | 2500 | 30 | 96 | | |

=== Trams ===
| Family | Subtype | Start of release | Number built | Length (mm) | Width (mm) | Seats | Passenger capacity | Photo |
|---|---|---|---|---|---|---|---|---|
| 71-931 | 71-931М 'Vityaz-М' | | 432 | 27 500 | 2500 | 60 | 185-265 | |
| 71-931 | 71-931AM 'Vityaz-Leningrad' | 2021 | 2 | | | | | |
| 71-931 | 71-931 'Vityaz' | | 11 | 27 000 | 2500 | 53 | 220-320 | |
| 71-922 'Varyag' | | 2016 | 1 | 21 420 | 2500 | 38 | 123-196 | |
| 71-921 'Corsair' | | 2020 | 1 | 20500 | 2300 | | 122-177 | |
| 71-923 | 71-923 'Bogatyr' | | 3 | 19 000 | 2500 | 34 | 131-184 | |
| 71-923 | 71-923М 'Bogatyr-М' | 2019 | 12 | 19 405 | 2500 | 45 | 138-193 | |
| 71-911 | 71-911 'City Star' | 2014 | 15 | 16 500 | 2500 | 33 | 119-170 | альт= |
| 71-911 | 71-911E 'City Star' | 2016 | 36 | | | | | |
| 71-911 | 71-911ЕМ 'Lionet' | 2018 | 113 | 16 700 | 2500 | 34 | 111-155 | |
| 71-934 | 71-934 'Lion' | 2018 | 1 | 34 700 | 2500 | 70 | 265-382 | |

== Financial performance ==
At the end of 2018, the company's revenue was 9.1 billion rubles, and its profit was 2.1 billion rubles. In addition, in 2018, PC Transport systems paid 1.1 billion rubles as tax deductions.

== Owners ==
As of 2018, 60% of PC Transport systems LLC's shares were owned by Transmashholding LLC, and 40% were owned by PC Transport systems’ president Felix Vinokur. General Director of PC Transport systems is Alexander Dubrovkin.

| Indicators | 2014 | 2015 | 2016 | 2017 | 2018 |
|---|---|---|---|---|---|
| Proceeds from sales | 0 | 420 m | 864 m | 10,4 billions | 9,1 billions |
| Cost | 35 m | 342 m | 649 m | 6,4 billions | |
| Net profit | -32 m | -1,9 m | 129 m | 3,1 billions | 2,1 billions |
