= LT-10 =

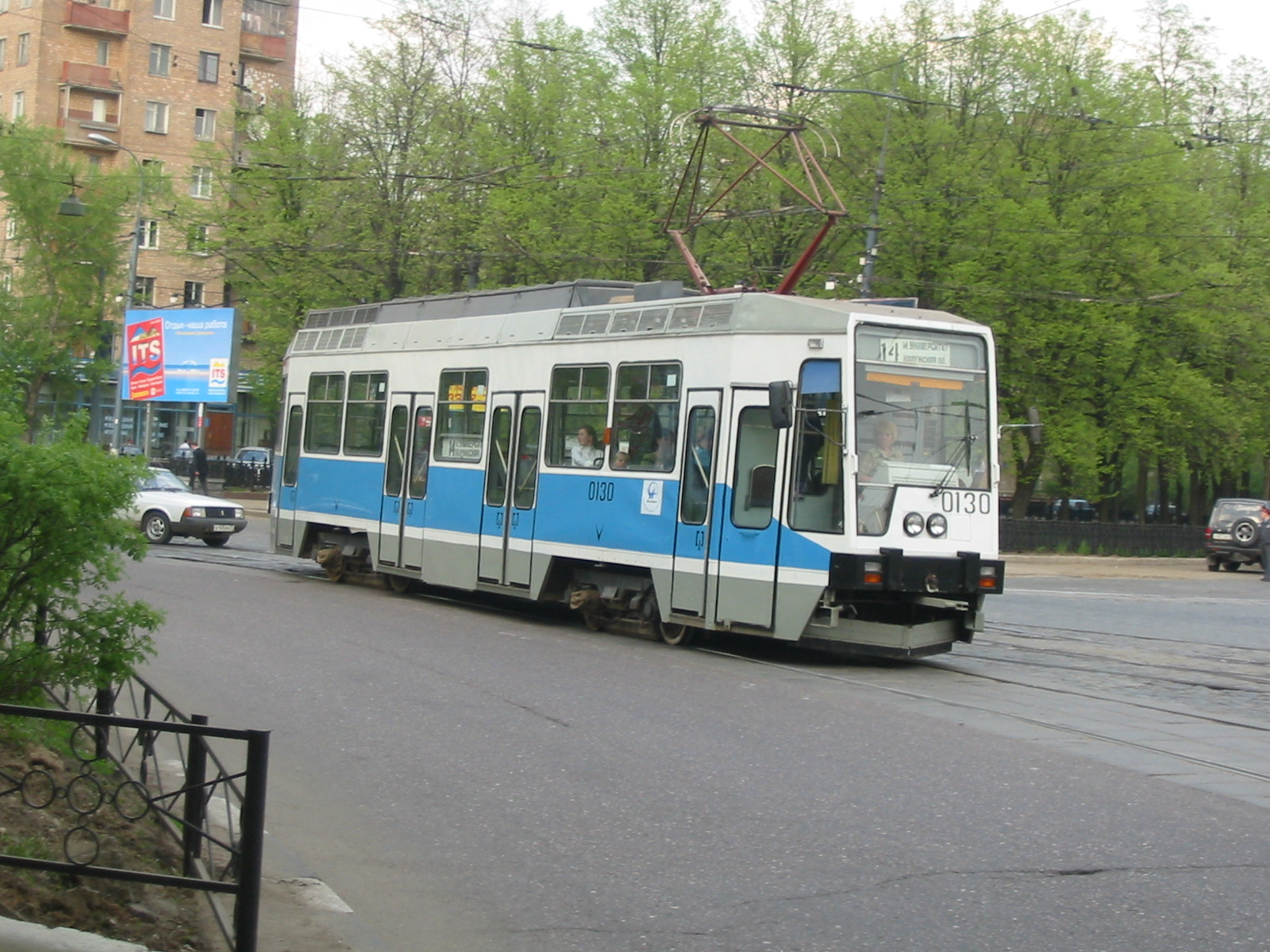
- LT-10 in Moscow
- Manufacturer: (Ukraine) Luhanskteplovoz
- Constructed: 1994-1998
- Number built: 14
- Capacity: 34 seats / 90 stand

Specifications
- Train length: 16,500 mm (54 ft 2 in)
- Width: 2,520 mm (8 ft 3 in)
- Height: 3,100 mm (10 ft 2 in)
- Doors: 4
- Maximum speed: 60
- Electric system(s): 550 V
- Bogies: 2
- Track gauge: 1,524 mm (5 ft)

LT-10 (Russian: ЛТ-10) is a series of Ukrainian high-floor four-axle tram cars, produced from 1994 to 1998 on the Lugansk Locomotive Plant.

That tram is unilateral and single-cab. The car is equipped with a thyristor-pulse control system and with three types of brakes: electric with the possibility of recuperation, electromagnetic (rail) and mechanical. Two-axle bogie-axle truck with individual drive of each wheel pair through axial support axial two-stage cylindrical traction reducer.

There was partially low-floor car unit (LT-10A) with a modified external design. This was the first low floor tramcar built in Ukraine.

A large number of incomplete and unfinished bodies of the LT-10 lay in the areas surrounding factories. A total of 16 LT-10 trams were known to have entered service in Moscow, Yenakiieve and Luhansk. None are currently in service. All vehicles except from 207 in Luhansk and 1120 in Moscow were scrapped. The gaps in the serial numbers likely represents the vehicles that had a completed body frame, but were never finished.
