= Tver Carriage Works =

Rail vehicle manufacturer in Tver, Russia

- Industry: Rail vehicle machine building
- Founded: 1898
- Headquarters: Tver, Russia
- Key people: General Director – Alexander Albertovich Vasilenko
- Products: Railroad car
- Revenue: $245 million (2015)
- Net income: 616,031,000 Russian ruble (2017)
- Number of employees: 9,978
- Parent: Transmashholding
- Website: www.tvz.ru

Tver Carriage Works (Russian: Тверской вагоностроительный завод, romanized: Tverskoy Vagonostroitelniy Zavod) is a rolling stock manufacturer located in Tver, Russia. The company is part of Transmashholding.

== History of the factory ==
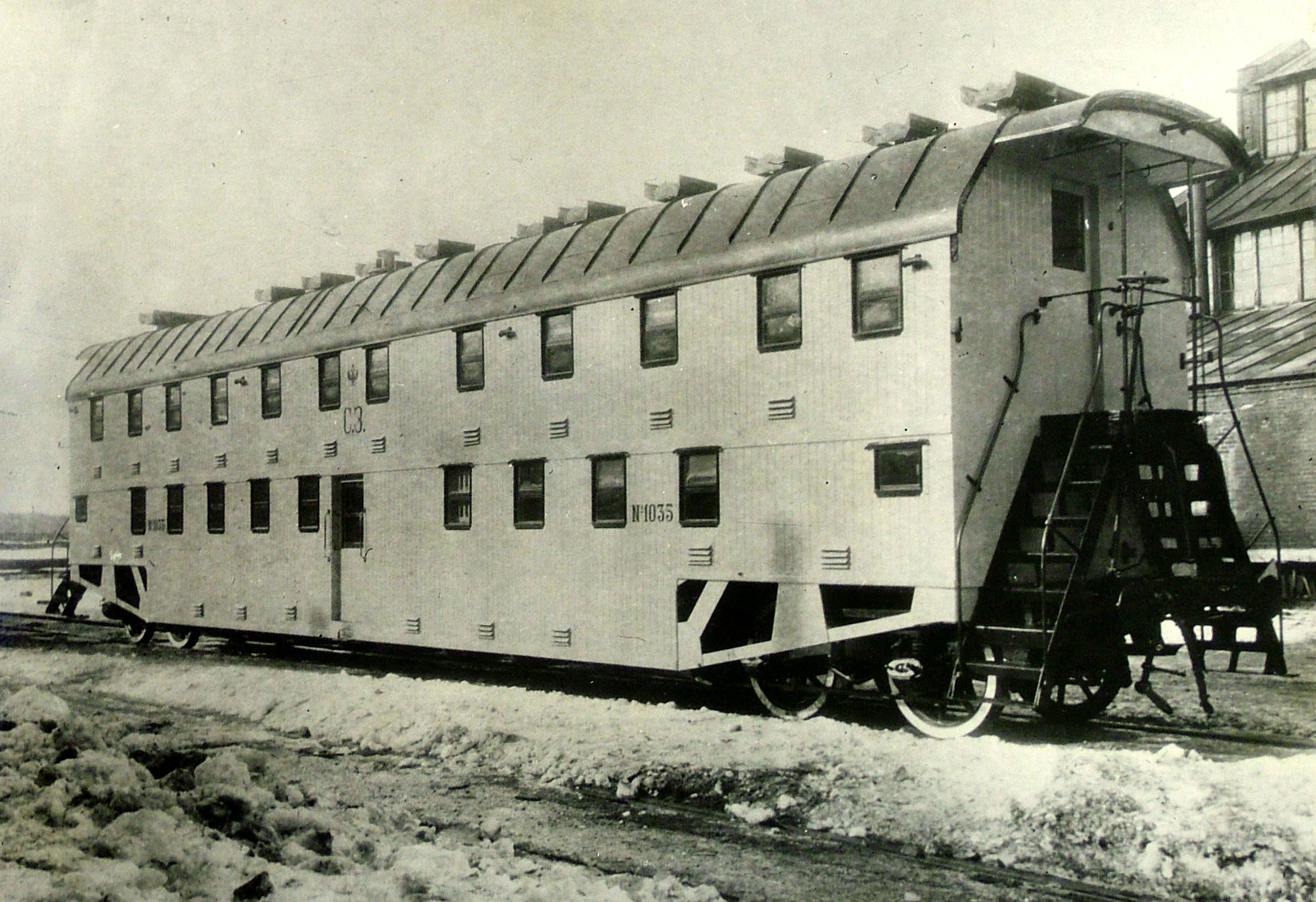
Bilevel rail car Russian, 1905

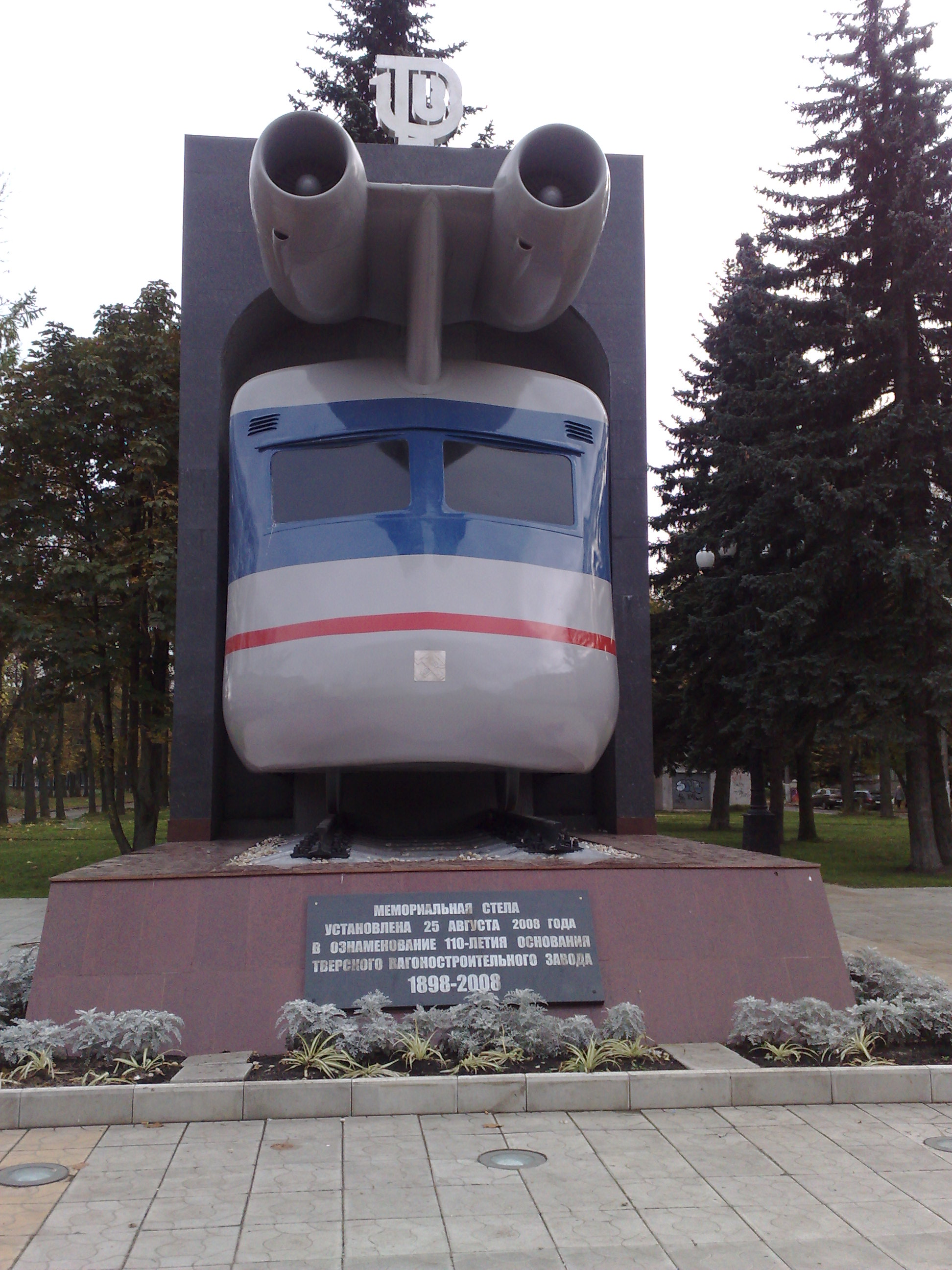
Monument SVL at the rail-car factory in Tver depicting a Turbojet train

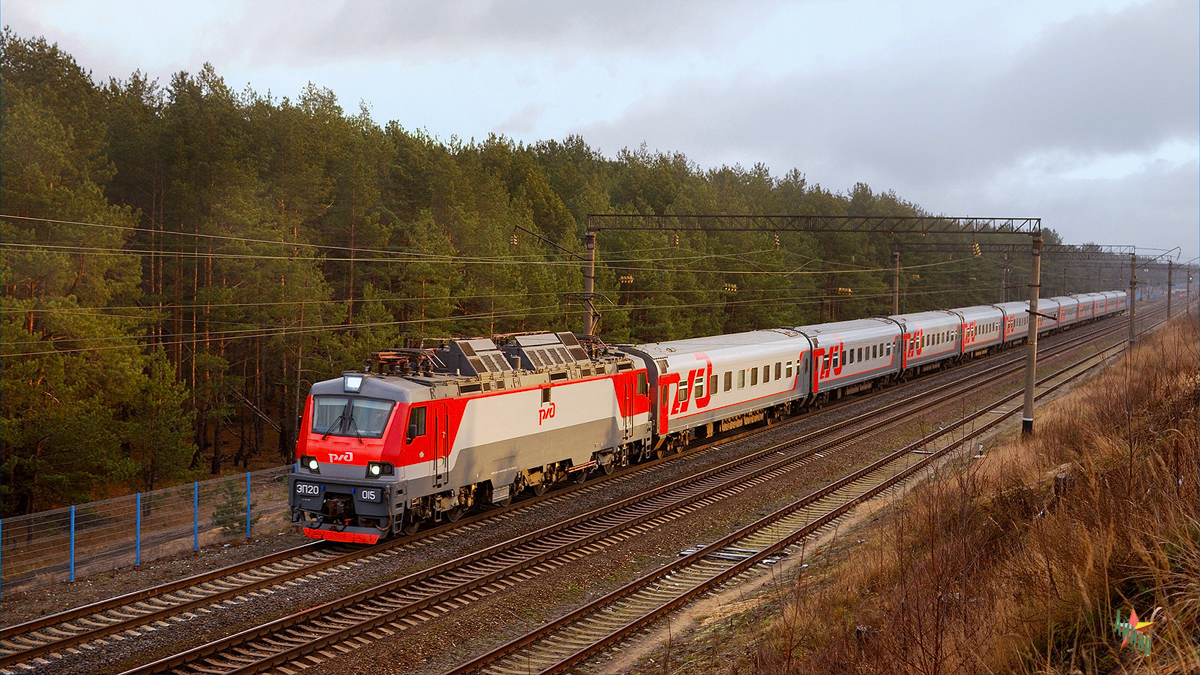
New passenger car, Passenger trains Moscow - Nizhny Novgorod

Tver Carriage Works was founded on 25 August 1898 with the name Upper Volga Railway Materials Plant. It was built at the initiative of the Franco-Belgian joint stock company Dyle et Bacalan in 1898. Initially the plant manufactured four-axle sleeping coaches for the international train company Express, passenger coaches of 4 classes, business cars with study lounges and sleeping compartments, and passenger coaches for hot-climate countries. The plant produced freight cars, platforms and refrigerator vans of different systems, tank cars, and latticed cars for peat transportation. It fulfilled the orders for production of tram cars, components, and spare parts for tram cars. Tver Carriage Works also manufactured military transports, guns, spare parts for agricultural equipment, and vehicles. Beginning in 1904 the plant manufactured double-decker passenger coaches for migrants to the Far East, and produced six-axle diner-lounges with a length of 26 m for the Grand-Ducal family.

During the period of nationalization, Tver Carriage Works produced passenger coaches, freight cars, tank cars, bogies, and two-wheeled carts for the Military Technical Department and different agricultural tools. In 1926 the plant started the production of 4-axle freight cars, platforms and third-class long-distance cars. During the years of industrialization, 20-ton freight cars, flat cars, 20.2-meter third-class passenger coaches and postal-baggage cars were the main types of Tver Carriage Works’s products. At the same time Tver Carriage Works manufactured cars for the Red Army, trailer vans to tractor drivers, and trailers' workshops.

The plant was severely damaged during the occupation of the city in 1941 by the Wehrmacht. After the liberation, reconstruction began. At the same time Tver Carriage Works began to produce artillery shells, mortars, bombs, mobile workshops, and medical railway cars for the Army. In October 1943, by the decision of the State Defense Committee, the enterprise was included into the number of major defense enterprises of the country. The plant produced 18 designations of military products. It also operated a tank-repair workshop. In 1944 the partially restored plant started the production of dumping cars, 4-axle platforms with a cargo capacity of 60 t, metal low-sided cars with a cargo capacity of 50 t, and, in 1948, four-axle covered freight cars with a cargo capacity of 50 t.

Since 1951 Tver Carriage Works has focused on the production of passenger coaches. In 1955 it became the first enterprise in the country to produce wheel sets with axle equipment on roller bearings.

In the 1960s, for the first time in the practice of the national railway engineering, wholesale production was set up at Tver Carriage Works and a large batch of coaches with air-conditioning systems and centralized electric power generated by electric power plant cars was manufactured for operation in the Central Asia and between Moscow and Leningrad:

- From 1959 till 1969 - head and trailer electric cars.
- From 1960 till 1966 - serial production of cars for interregional communication.
- From 1961 till 1970 - power cars were made.
- In 1970 - coaches for deluxe trains "Ulyanovsk", Russia.
- In 1965 - express train "Aurora" with a maximum speed of 160–180 km/h.
- In 1970 - track-testing car with a jet propulsion for cars testing at the speeds of up to 300 km/h.
- In 1971 - first serial production of two-level platforms for light motor vehicles transportation.
- In 1972 - 1973 - SVL express train "Russian Troika" with a maximum speed of 200 km/h.

A new stage in the history of the plant began in 1993. A multidivisional structure was established at Tver Carriage Works on the basis of the Kalinin railcar industrial association, in accordance with the President Decree № 721 "On Organizational Measures for Transformation of the State-Owned Enterprises and Voluntary associations of the State Enterprises into Joint Stock Companies" dated July 1, 1992.

Throughout the years Tver Carriage Works has continued to provide the country's car-building industry with bogies, wheelsets, brake products, forgings and stampings, and cast-iron casting. Passenger-coach bogies provide extra-soft rides at speeds up to 160 km/h, while brand-new bogies with disk magnetic rail brakes provide operations of cars at speeds up of 200 km/h and were created in 1996.

== List of products ==
The main activities of Tver Carriage Works are the production and sales of passenger coaches and other types of rolling stock, components and spare parts for rolling stock, maintenance, and repair.

=== Rolling stock ===
Tver Carriage Works manufactures the following products and provides the following services:

- New passenger coaches hauled by locomotives at speeds up to 200 km/h
- Freight cars and special-purpose railcars.
- Electric multiple units (Ivolga)
- Tram cars (in cooperation with PK Transportnye Sistemy - a Russian manufacturer of public transport)
- Bogies for passenger coaches
- Wheel sets for passenger cars and freight cars
- Spare parts for passenger coaches
