= Daugavpils Satiksme =

Bus and tram system in Daugavpils, Latvia

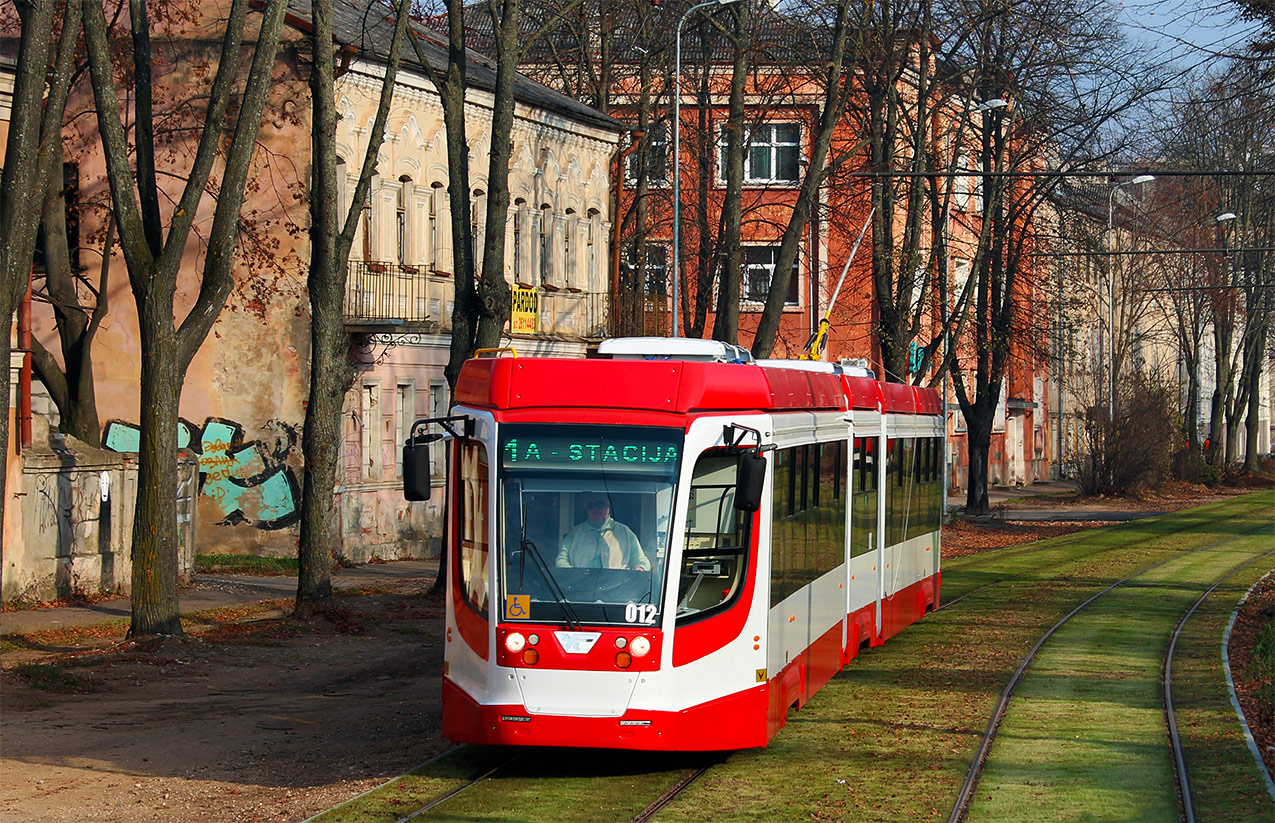
- Type: city municipality owned corporation
- Industry: Public transportation
- Founded: 2014
- Headquarters: Daugavpils, Latvia
- Area served: Daugavpils
- Parent: N/A
- Website: www.satiksme.daugavpils.lv

Daugavpils Satiksme (English: Daugavpils Transport) is the public transport corporation which operates tram and bus systems in the eastern Latvian city of Daugavpils.

Two municipal public transport companies existed before 1 January 2014; A/S "Tramvaju uzņēmums" (Tramway Enterprise JSC) and SIA "Daugavpils autobusu parks".

== Buses ==
The bus network currently comprises 33 routes. In 2021 the purchase of 35 compressed natural gas powered buses was approved, to be supported by the Cohesion Fund. In 2022 the fleet consisted of 28 Solaris, 16 Volvo, 5 Iveco and 11 Mercedes-Benz vehicles.

=== Bus routes ===
Number	Start point - Intermediate points	End point
~~1~~	~~Autoosta – Regional hospital~~	~~Ceļinieku ciemats~~
2	Garāžas	Autoosta
2A	Jaunforštadte – Regional hospital – Vecstropi	Autoosta
3	Autoosta	Jaunie Stropi (Cooperative)
4	Autoosta – Cietoksnis – Mežciems	Autoosta
5	Autoosta – Mežciems – Cietoksnis	Autoosta
6	Autoosta	Nīderkūni
7	Autoosta	Kalkūni
7B	Autoosta – Kalkūni	Horticultural society „Mičurinietis”
8	Autoosta	Judovka
9	Autoosta	Grīva (Ķiršu iela)
10	Autoosta	Ruģeļi
10A	Autoosta	Ruģeļi (Kindergarten)
11	Jaunforštadte	Regional hospital
12	Autoosta	Križi
13	Autoosta	Mežciema arodskola
13A	Autoosta	Cietoksnis
14	Autoosta – Cietoksnis	Ķīmiķu ciemats (including Plaušu centrā)
15	Autoosta – Liginišķi	Autoosta
16	Autoosta – Piena kombināta ciemats	Autoosta
17	Autoosta – Stacijas iela	Jaunforštadte
17A	Autoosta – Ceļu satiksmes drošības direkcija (Road Safety Directorate)	Jaunforštadte
18	Viduspoguļanka (Vāveru iela)	Autoosta
19	Autoosta – Jaunforštadte – Ķīmiķu ciemats – Jaunbūve	Jaunforštadte
20	Jaunforštadte – Jaunbūve – Ķīmiķu ciemats	Jaunforštadte (Ciolkovska)
~~20A~~	~~Jaunforštadte~~	~~Jaunbūve~~
20B	Jaunforštadte – Smiltenes iela – Jaunbūve	Ķīmiķu ciemats
21	Autobusu parks – Daugavpils AO – Jaunforštadte – Viduspoguļanka – Mežciems – Cietoksnis – Daugavpils AO	Autobusu parks
22	Autobusu parks – Daugavpils AO – Nīderkuni – Judovka – Ruģeļi-Jaunbūve – Ķīmiķu ciemats – Jaunstropi – Vecstropi	Križi
23	Ruģeļi	Regional hospital
24	Autoosta – Jaunbūve – Ķīmiķu ciemats – Jaunforštadte Cietoksnis	Autoosta
26	Autoosta – Ķīmiķu ciemats – Jaunforštadte	Autoosta
30	Autoosta – Maiznieks	Spaļu iela
38	Autoosta – Spaļu iela	Ziegler machine works

== Tramways ==
The tram network was opened on 5 November 1946 and a second line was opened in 1950 and extended in 1951 and 1958. Further extensions followed in 1965, 1990, 2020 and 2023. It comprises approximately 25 kilometres of track and five lines, the fourth opening within existing infrastructure in January 2022 and the fifth in January 2023.

The network uses Russian broad-gauge trackage of 1,524 mm (5 ft); along with the tram network of Riga these are the only two utilizing such a gauge inside the European Union. An uncommon characteristic is the use of trolley poles for current collection, although these are being phased out from the late 2010s. Green track is extensively used throughout and the northern sections pass through woodland areas. Tramcars are stored outside at a depot on Butļerova Street.

=== Tram network ===
Number	Start point	End point
1	Butļerova iela	Stacija
2	Butļerova iela	Maizes kombināts
3 / 5	Stropi	Cietoksnis
4	Maizes kombināts	Stacija

=== Rolling stock ===
Manufacturer	Model	Year built	Year delivered	In operation	Number delivered	Number in operation	Notes
RVR	RVR-6M2	1975—1988		1975—2014	64	-	Not used in normal revenue service; operated as heritage vehicles.
Tatra	T3D (T3DC1/T3DC2)	1973, 1975, 1981, 1983	2002	2002—present	12	10	Purchased secondhand from the tram system in Schwerin, Germany in 2002. Upgraded in 1992 to current standard. Operated in 2 wagon units predominantly on line 1.
UKVZ	KTM-5 (71-605A)	1990—1991		1990—present	12	12	UKVZ is located in Ust-Katav, Russia. Predominantly used on lines 1 and 3.
UKVZ	KTM-8 (71-608K)	1994		1994—present	1	1	
UKVZ	KTM-23 (71-623-01)	2014		2014—present	8	8	40% low-floor
UKVZ	KTM-31 (71-631)	2014		2014—present	4	4	Three-section six-axle articulated wagon; 70% low-floor.
Transmashholding TVZ	71-911 'City Star'	2019		2020—present	8	8	First trams equipped with pantographs. 100% low-floor. Predominantly used on lines 1 and 2.
Pragoimex/DLRR	EVO1	2023		2023—present	4	4	First trams with articulated bogies. 100% low-floor. Assembled locally from imported kits at DLRR. Pragoimex is part of a Czech consortium and is partially owned by Škoda Transportation.

In 2020 a realignment servicing the Daugavpils Regional Hospital opened. This project saw the introduction of the first pantograph equipped cars.

== Future projects ==
In February 2016 the Ministry of Transport announced plans for the construction of a new tram line. Preliminary plans call for a connection between the Jaunforštadte area in the north of the city and the centre of the network, in the vicinity of Daugavpils Station. The route is projected to increase the number of tram passengers to around 500 000 per year. The project was cancelled in 2022.

In September 2020, the Municipal Council of Daugavpils considered an allocation of 24,000 euros for the subsequent implementation of the project for the construction of a new tramline, which supposedly will connect the “Jaunstropi” district with the “Ķimiķu ciemats” district. Czech Pragoimex trams will be assembled locally at the Daugavpils Locomotive Repair Plant (DLRR) as part of the project which will for the first time connect two separate lines.

== Gallery ==
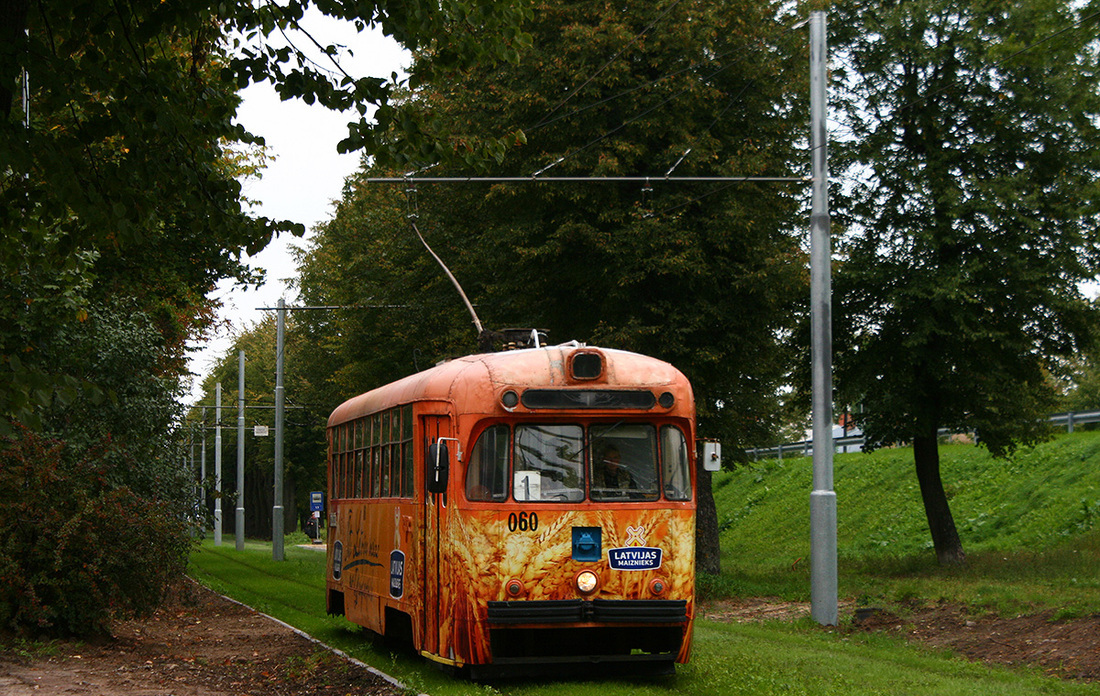
RVR-6

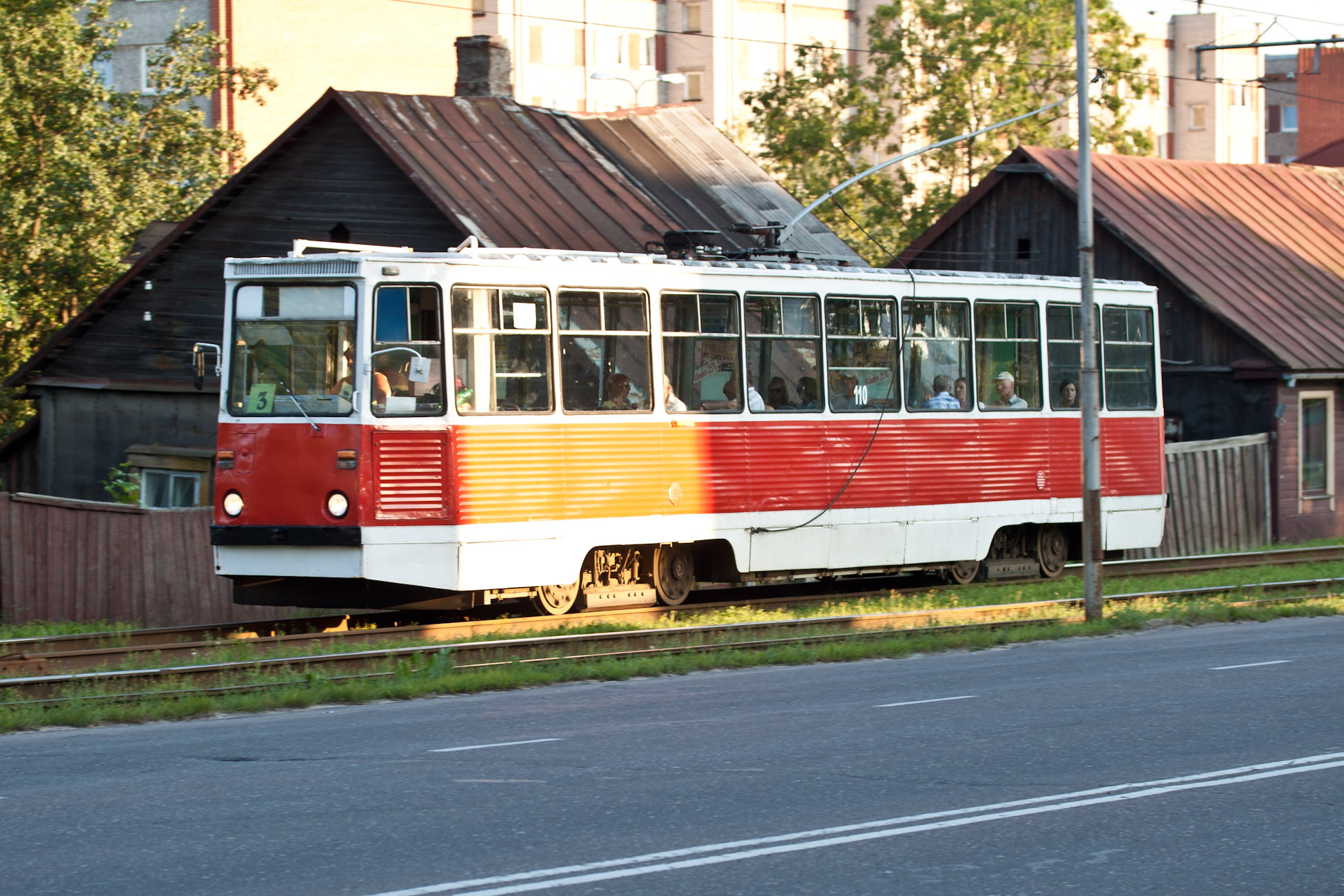
KTM-5

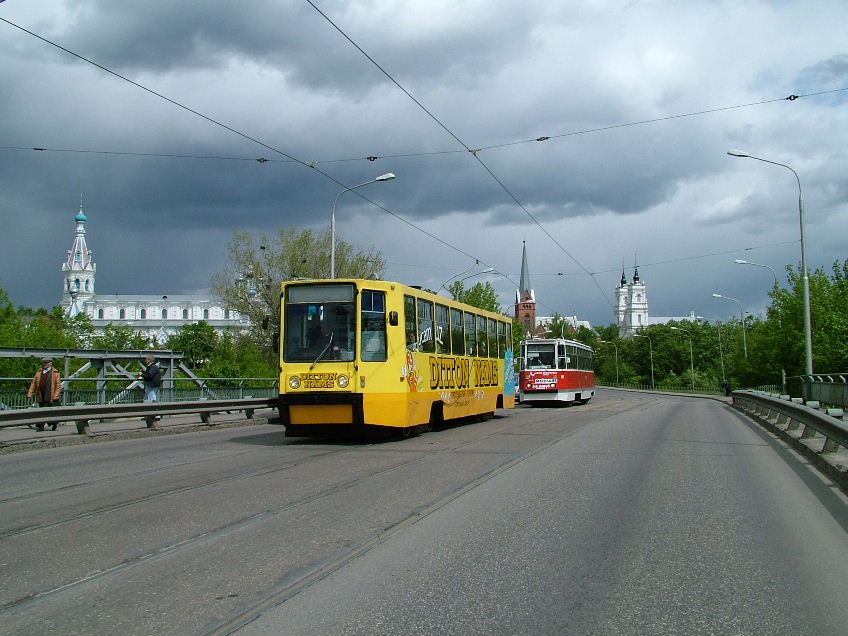
KTM-8

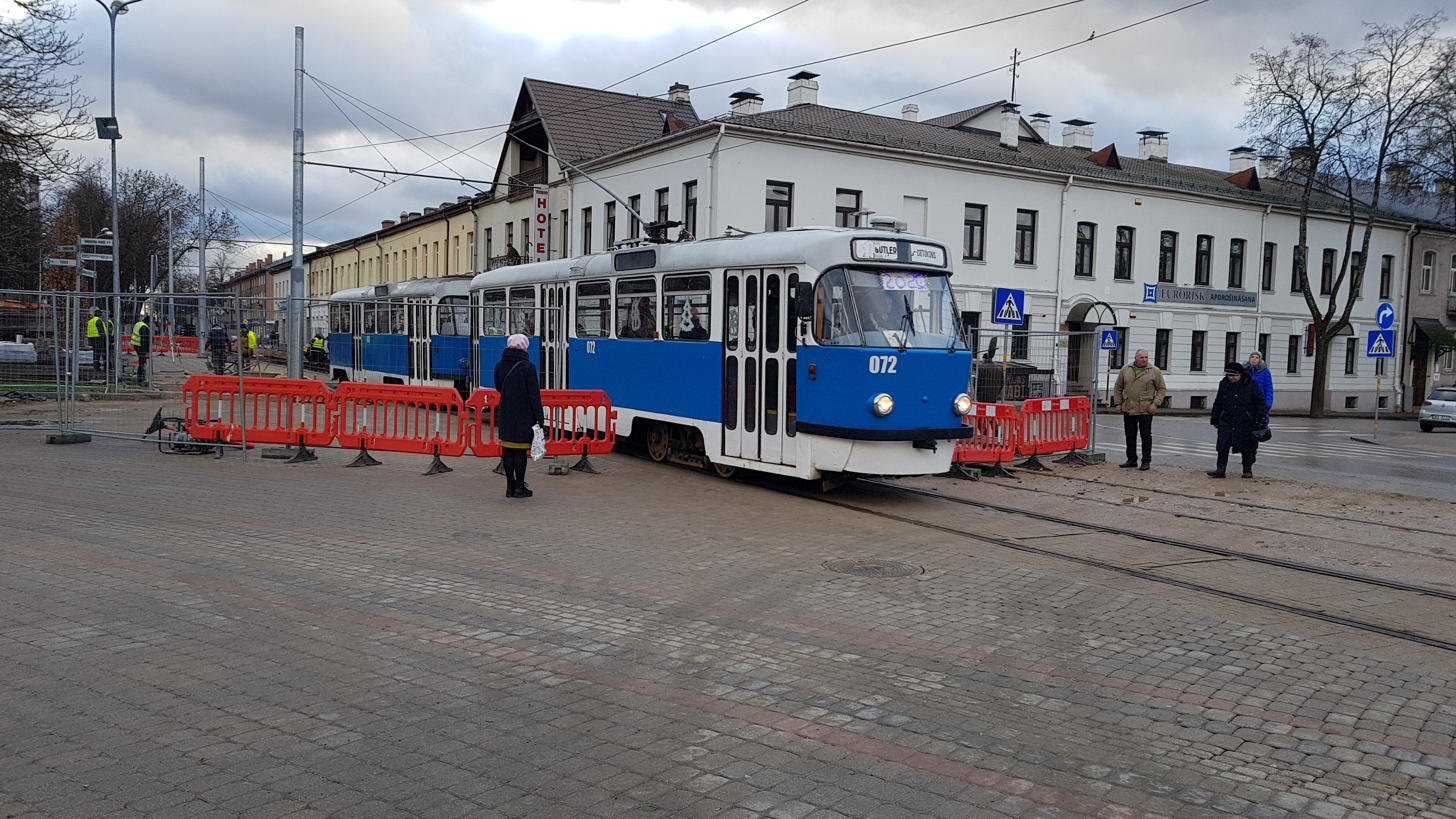
Tatra T3D

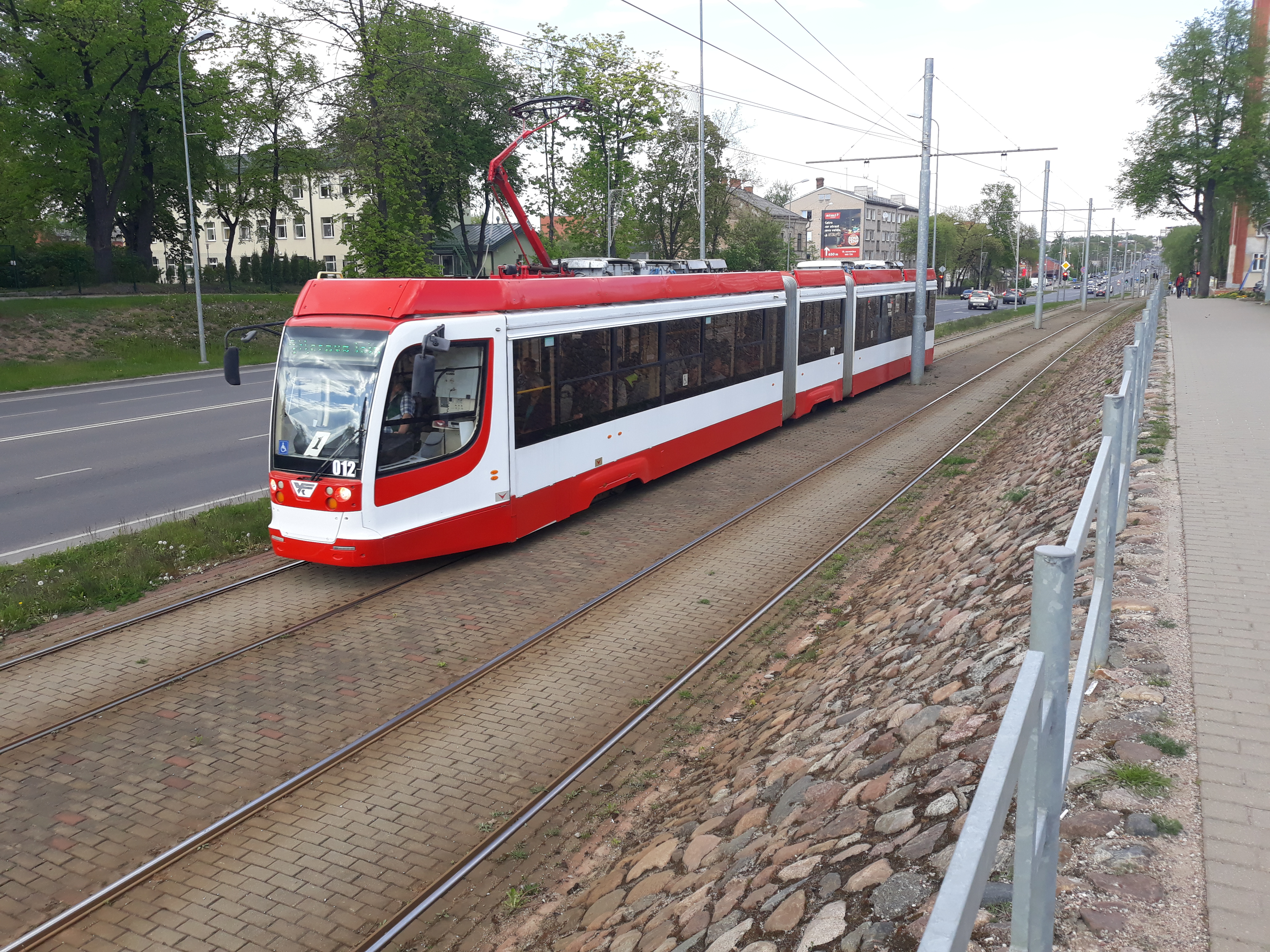
KTM-31

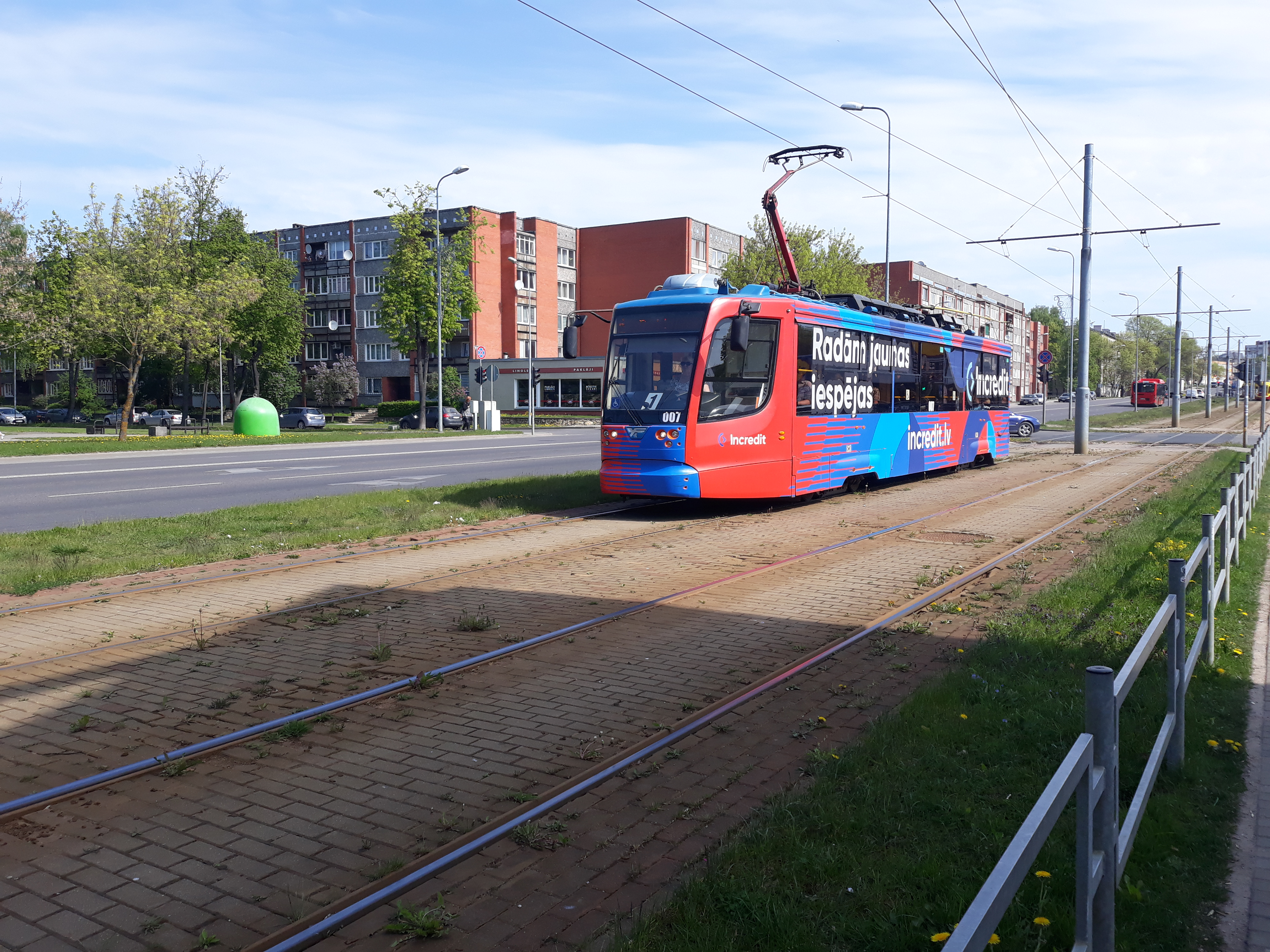
KTM-23

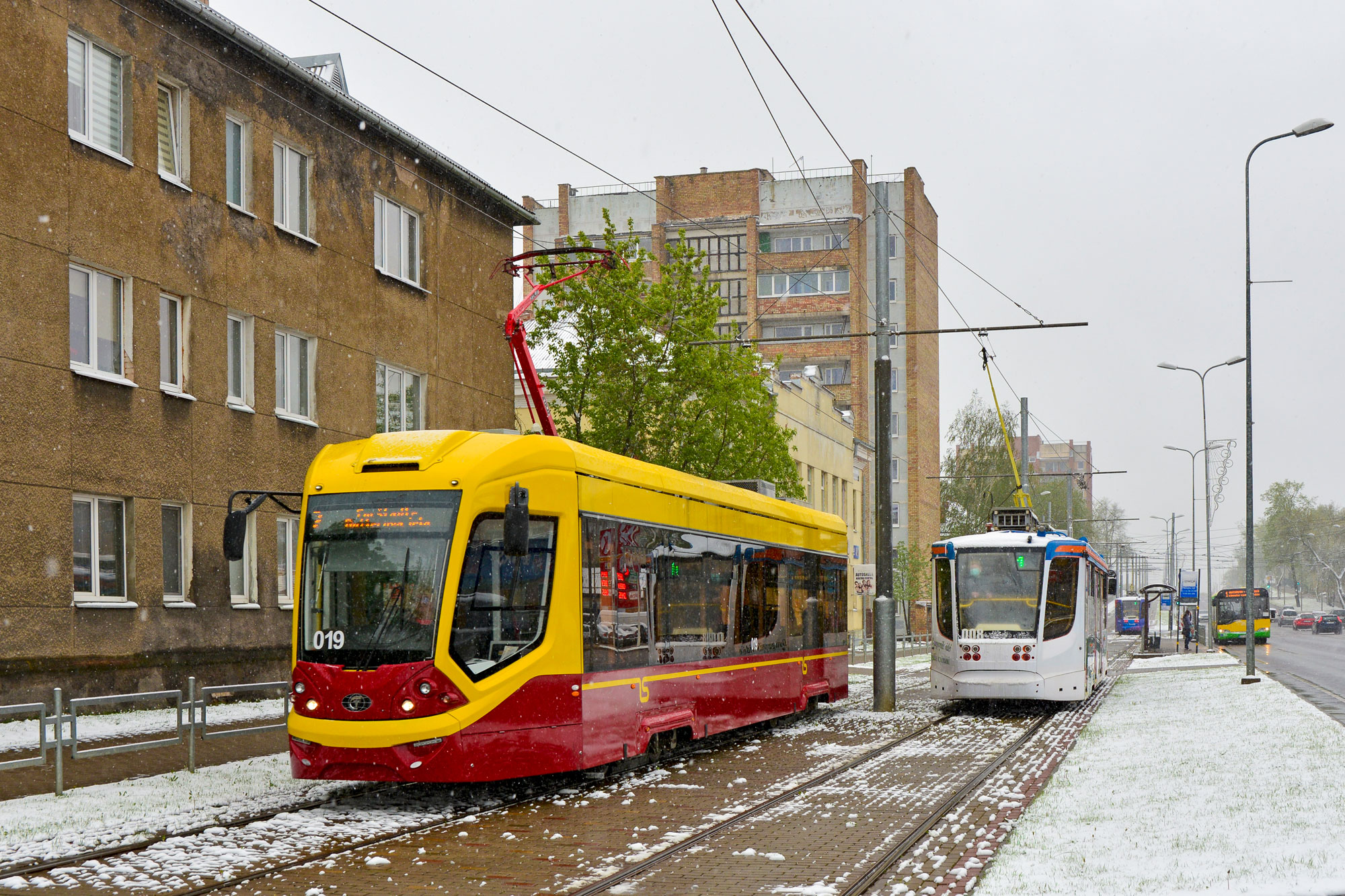
TVZ City Star (71-911)

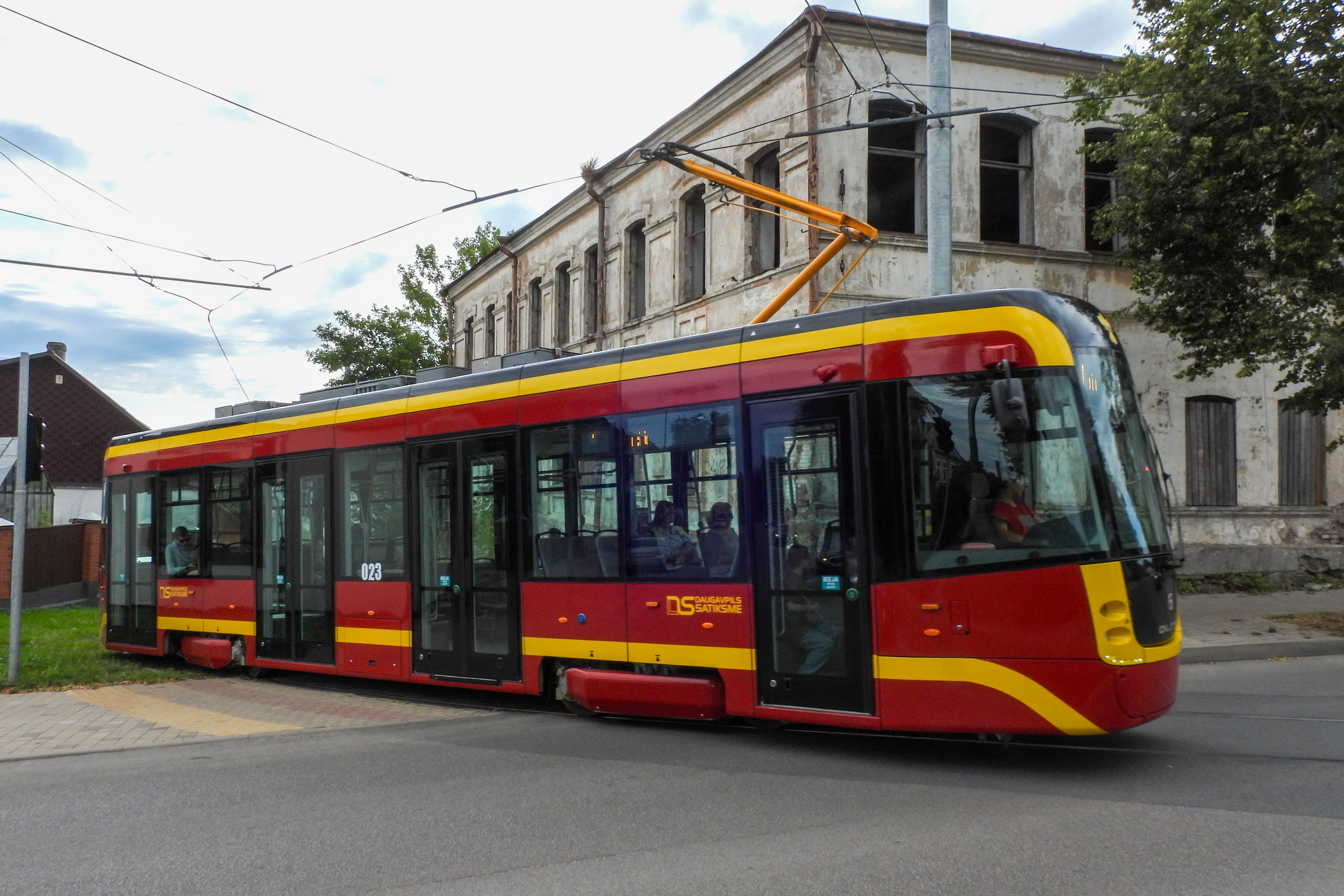
EVO1

Lines and termini of the tram system as of 2020

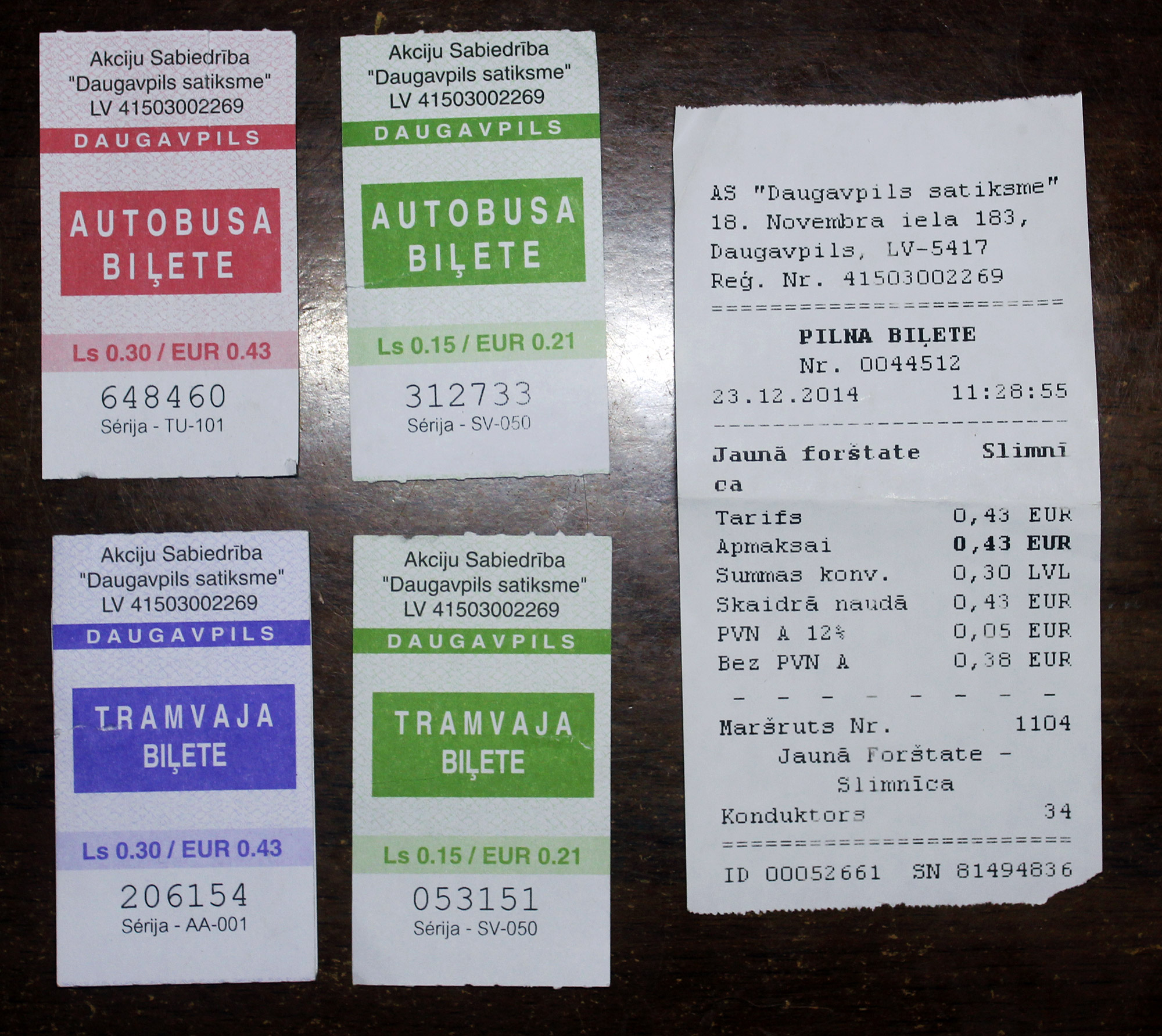
Single journey tickets

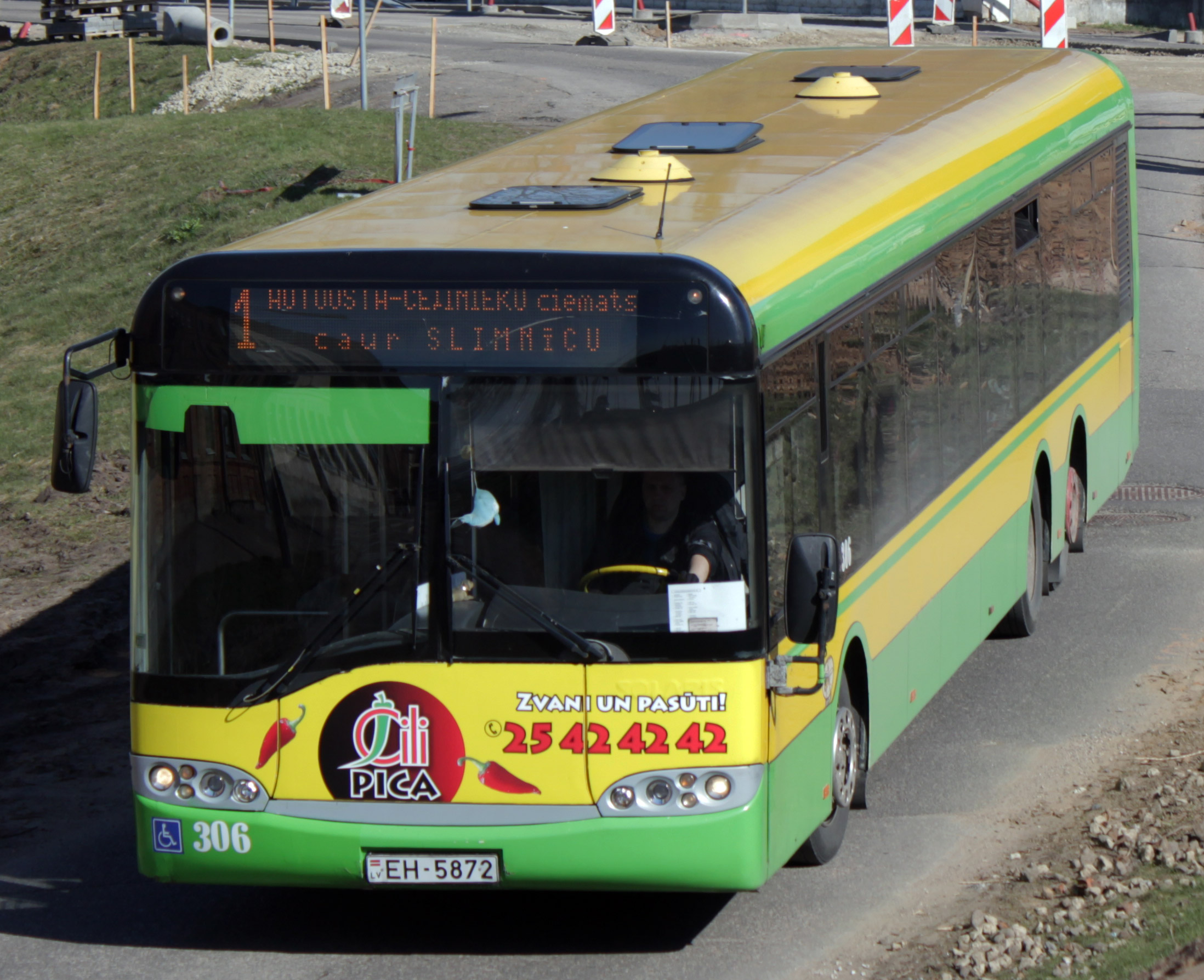
Bus on route 1

== See also ==
- Daugavpils Airport
