= Trams in Mariupol =

Mainline route in Ukraine

Mariupol Tram
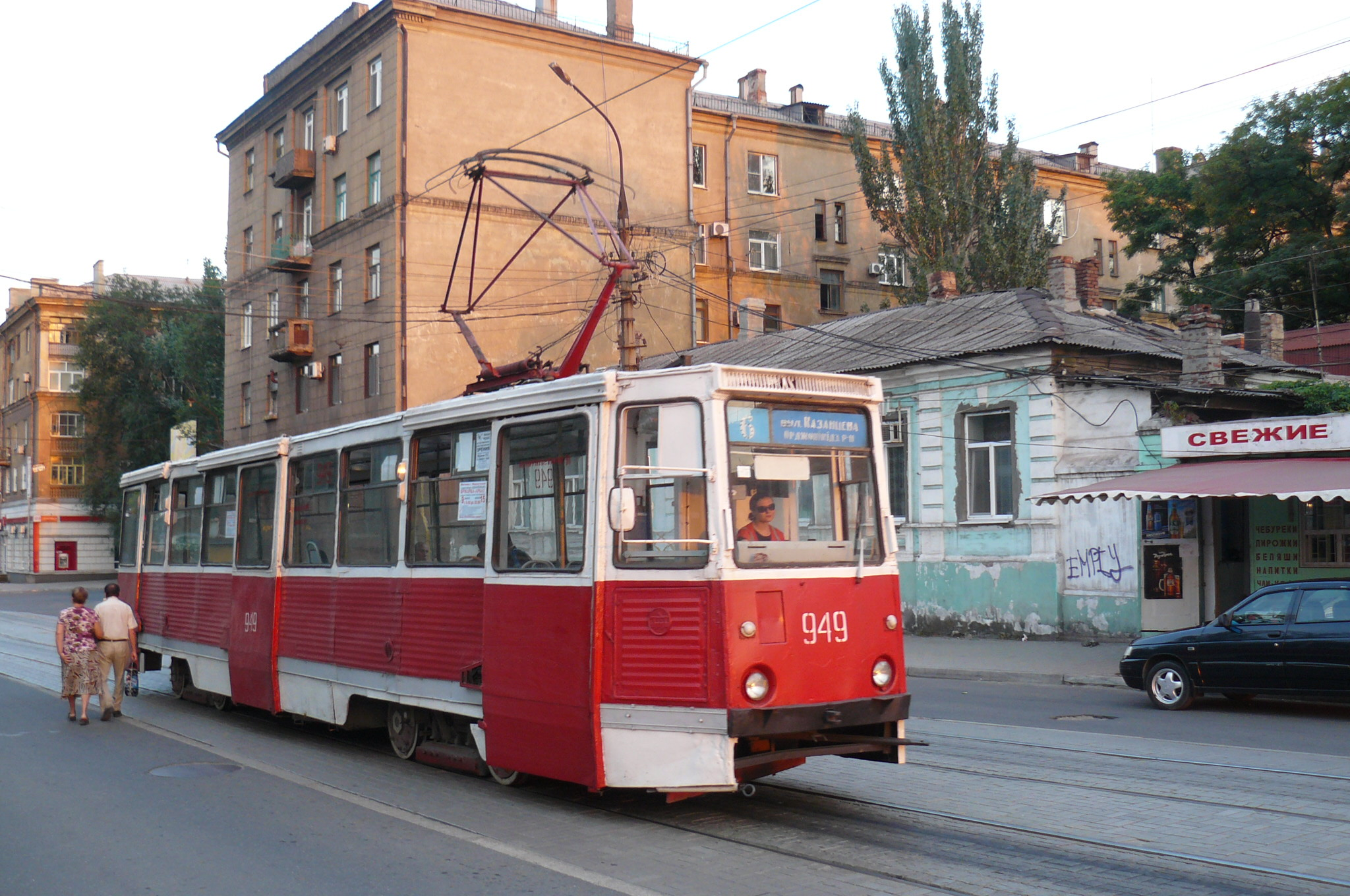
- A tram in Mariupol in June 2012

Overview
- Owner: Mariupol Tram and Trolleybus Management
- Locale: Mariupol
- Transit type: Tram
- Number of lines: 12
- Number of stations: 161

Operation
- Operation will start: 1 May 1933
- Operators: Mariupol Tram and Trolleybus Management
- Number of vehicles: 96
- Train length: 14 m

Technical
- System length: 12.5
- Track gauge: 1522 mm
- Top speed: 65 km/h

The Mariupol Tram (Ukrainian: Маріупольський трамвай, romanized: Mariupolskyi tramvai) is a tram network in the city of Mariupol, Ukraine. The Mariupol Tram network began operating on May 1, 1933. The total length of tram network was 116 km with 8 regular and 4 peak routes. The tram is currently operating with reduced service.

== History ==
Discussion regarding the construction of a tram in Mariupol began in 1904. For twenty years efforts were made to finance construction of a tram line though were unsuccessful. In 1925, the city council approved financing for the construction of a tram line connecting the town of Mariupol to the adjacent Azovstal Iron and Steel Works across the Kalmius River.

On 1 September 1931 a tram construction office was established by a joint decision between the city party committee and the city council. During construction, the city newspaper "Pryazovsky Proletar" often wrote about the progress of the works: difficulties with building materials and shortages of unskilled labor. Employees of the Ilyich plant and four construction teams provided significant material assistance for the timely completion of the construction of the electric tram. Service on the first tram line began on May 1, 1933, in time for May Day. The first tram line connected Schmidt Harbor to the city center via Franka Street. Tram service was interrupted during World War II in the years 1942 to 1945.

In subsequent years 16 additional routes were added to the tram network. Before the breakout of the Siege of Mariupol the tram network had 12 routes (8 regular and 4 rush hour) and serviced 161 stops. A campaign to modernize the system with improved vehicles and more modern announcement abilities began in 2017.

On March 2, 2022, tram operations were suspended due to threats to personnel and riders during the Russian invasion of Ukraine and subsequent Siege of Mariupol. In the course of the fighting and eventual takeover by the Russian Army, the infrastructure of the city suffered significant destruction. Post-war assessments are that approximately 90% of the network is beyond repair. Restoration is estimated to cost several hundred million rubles and take three years to complete. On 2 May 2023, the tram system partially opened again, operating on a single route with Russian-donated Tatra T3 trams.

== Routes ==
The Mariupol Tram had 16 routes at its peak operation and 8 operational routes before the 2022 Russian invasion of Ukraine. Some cancelled lines are as a result of consolidations while others have been physically been shuttered and removed. On March 27, 2017, tram traffic to the Azovstal Smelter was ceased. On December 1, 2018, route Route 3 was changed and the route was extended to Livoberezhny District. Route 4 to City Hospital and Route 2 to Livoberezhny District were created. There were also changes in the schedules of tram routes No. 5, 6, 9 and 11 and the canceled route No. 15. On February 10, 2022, an official application for smartphones was launched in Mariupol, in which you can see the movement of public transport in real time. All routes were rendered inoperable during the Siege of Mariupol and service had not resumed until 2 May 2023.

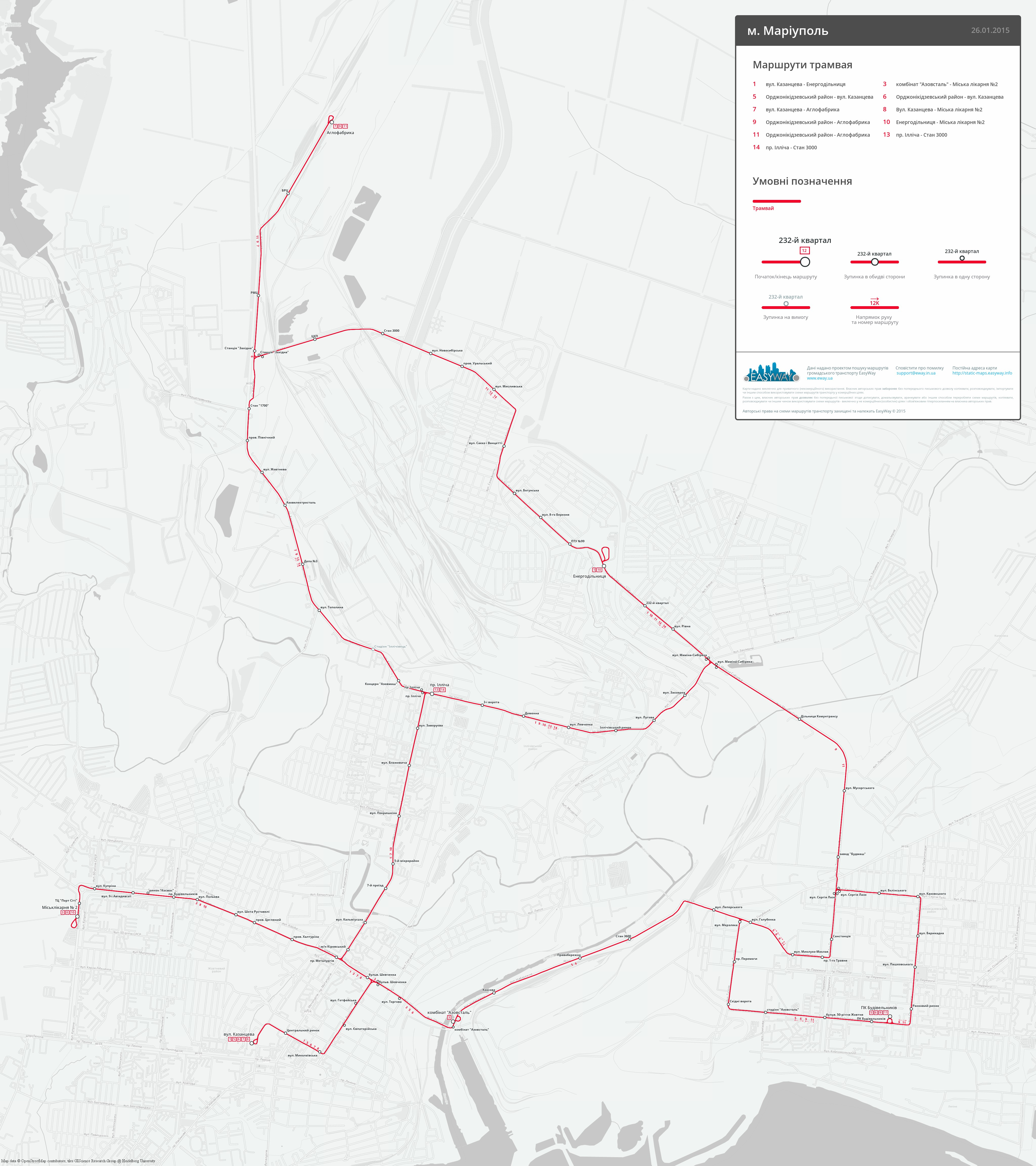
A map of the Mariupol Tram network

== Depots ==
- Tram Depot No. 1 was located 92 Mykolaivska Street. The depot was until recently the city's central tram depot serving routes 1, 3, 7, 8, 10 but closed in 2004. The depot was located in the center of the Central District and was sold by the tram operator for the construction of a modern residential complex.
- Tram Depot No. 2 is located 22 Taganrozka Street on the Left Bank of the Kalmius River. The depot originally served the "Azovstal" line. Before its closure due to the war, depot No. 2 served routes 5, 6, 9, 11.
- Tram Depot No. 3 is located at 162 Karpova Avenue in the Kalmius District. Before its closure, Depot No. 3 served routes 7, 9, 10, 13, 14.

== Rolling Stock ==
Tram traffic was opened in the city in 1933 by 8 X+M tram trains (12X, 7M and 1 Kyiv 4-axle car which arrived before World War II). In the post-war period, 8 train sets of Kyiv-made trams from the Dombal Plant arrived. Later KTM/KTP-2 train sets were added, and in the 1960s, 2 more RVZ-6 cars were added. Between 1967 and 1985, all historic cars were replaced by the Tatra T3 model. Retired Mariupol train sets were then transferred to Donetsk, Odesa and Zaporizhia.

Between 1985 and 2017, the main type of trams in Mariupol were KTM-5 models. On January 26, 2017, the first Tatra T3 SUCS wagon arrived in Mariupol. Another 9 wagons arrived in February 2017. Trams previously operational in Prague were repurposed and sent to Mariupol where they received model numbers 701–710.

Mariupol damaged tram Tatra T3 ex-Koshice in Vadim Zadorozmyi museum in Krasnogorsk (2024)

As of April 1, 2017, the system operated 80 wagons with 70 wagons operating daily on city routes. KTM-8 trams (Nos. 601–605) were operated from November 1993 to August 2017. In 2018, used Tatra T3A tram cars from Riga began operating out of tram depot No. 3. From December 31, 2018, onward, the management of Tram Depot No. 2 chose to stop the operation of KTM-5 type cars. These cars began to be replaced by Tatra T3SUCS trams from Tram Depot No. 3. In the lead up to the Siege of Mariupol there were only 6 working cars of the KTM-5 type left in tram depot No. 3. Of those, KTM-5 cars were only allowed to operate on routes No. 13 and 14. During the first quarter of 2019, the last trams of the KTM-5 model were decommissioned and scrapped.

=== Current ===
Picture	Manufacturer	Model	Quantity	Since
	(Czech Republic) ČKD Tatra	T3SU (3 doors); T3SUCS; T3A	1; 21; 15	2017; 2017; 2018

=== Historical ===
Picture	Manufacturer	Model	Quantity	Years
	(Russia) UKVZ	Kh	24	1933–1960s
	(Ukraine) KZET	2M	24	1933–1960s
	(Russia) UKVZ	KTM-1	4	1950s–1960s
	(Latvia) RVR	MTV-82	21	1950s–1960s
	(Russia) UKVZ	KTM-2	105	1960s–1980s
	(Latvia) RVR	6	2	1961–1966
	(Czech Republic) ČKD Tatra	T3SU (2 doors)	34	1967–1990s
	(Russia) UKVZ	KTM-5	19	1990–2017
	(Russia) UKVZ	71-608	5	1993–2017
	(Ukraine) Tatra-Yug	K1; K1M	4; 1	2006–2022; 2016–2022
	(Russia) PTMZ	71-153	1	2012–2022

== Fares ==
The tram system offered monthly passes for travel (school, student, public, official), as well as combined (tram, trolleybus). Fares in 2021 were 9.00 ₴. In 2017, in collaboration with PrivatBank, a project was implemented to pay for fares in public transport using a QR code through the "Privat24" application. This marked the first instance of cashless fares on the system.

== Gallery ==
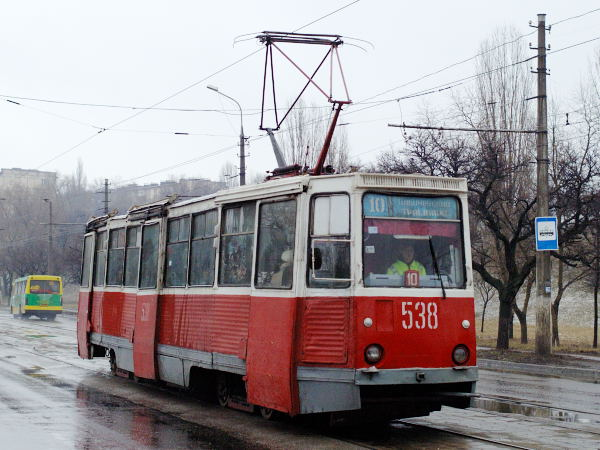
A 71-605A tram in operation

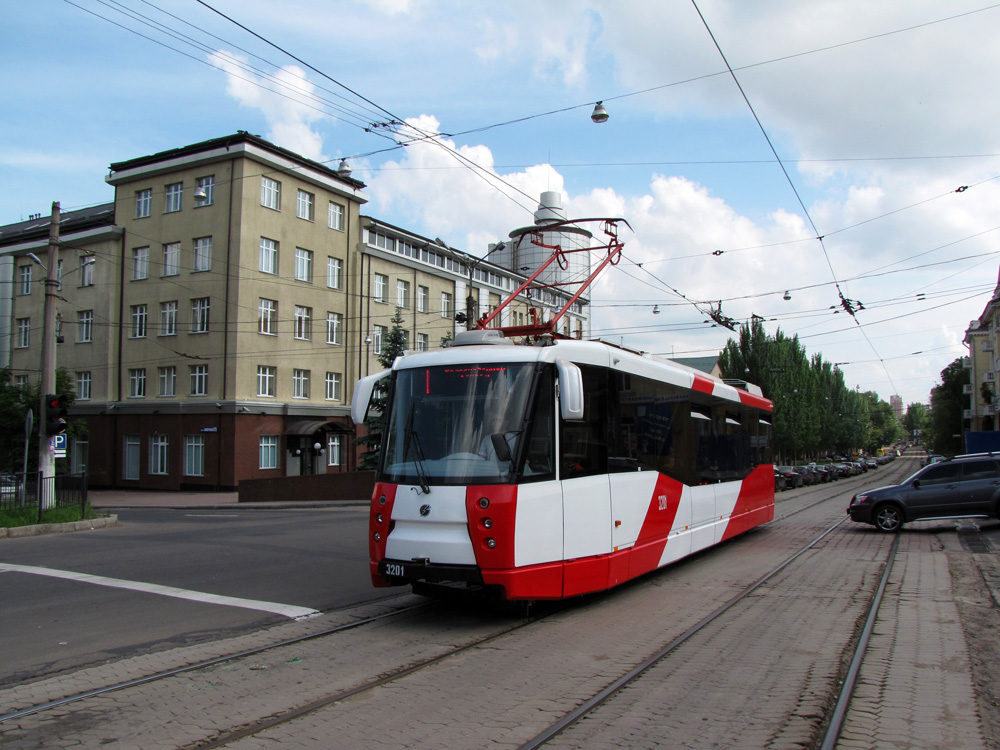
A LM-2008 tram in operation in 2012

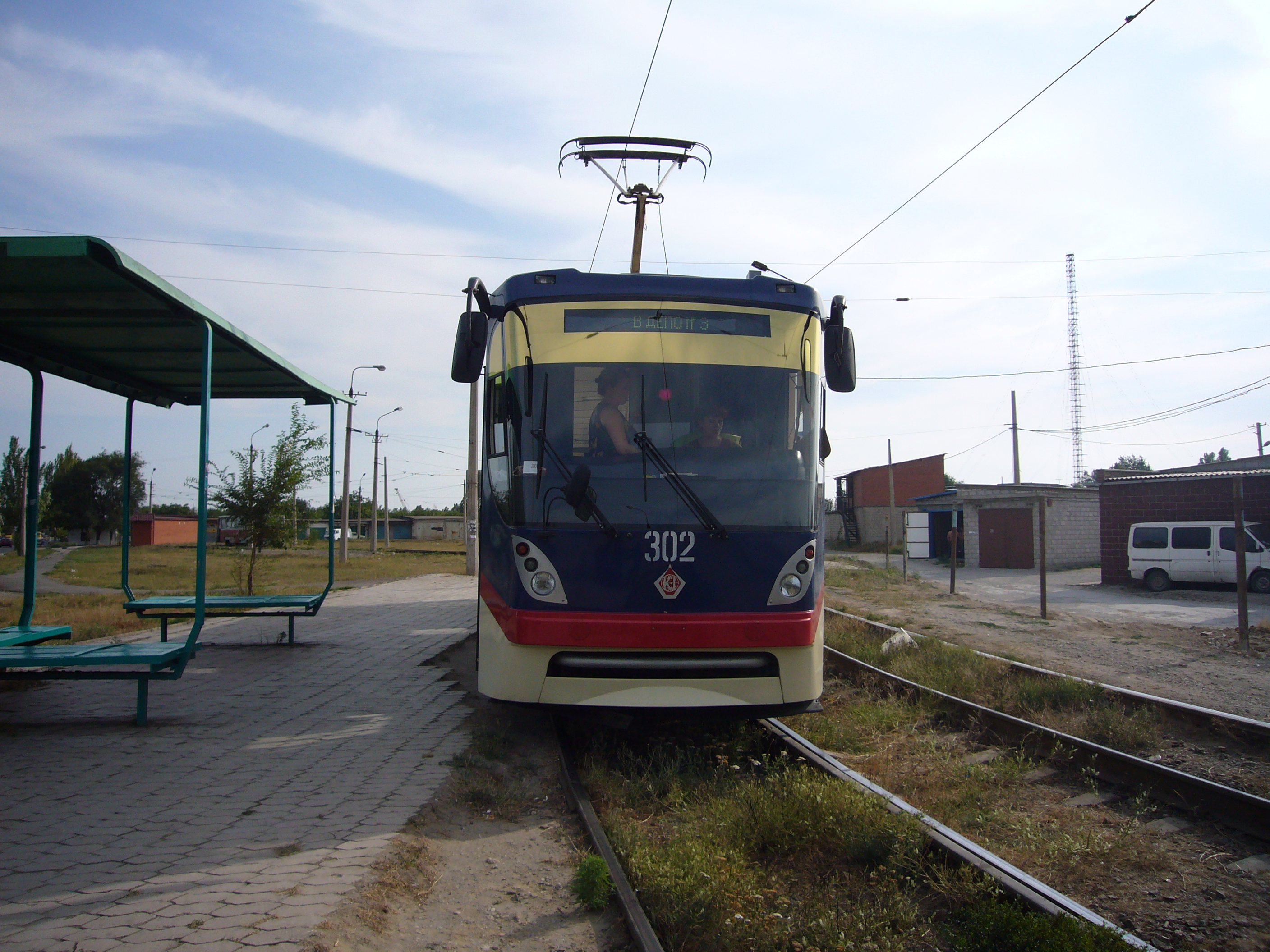
A K-1 tram which began service between 2006 and 2008 which runs on Route 10

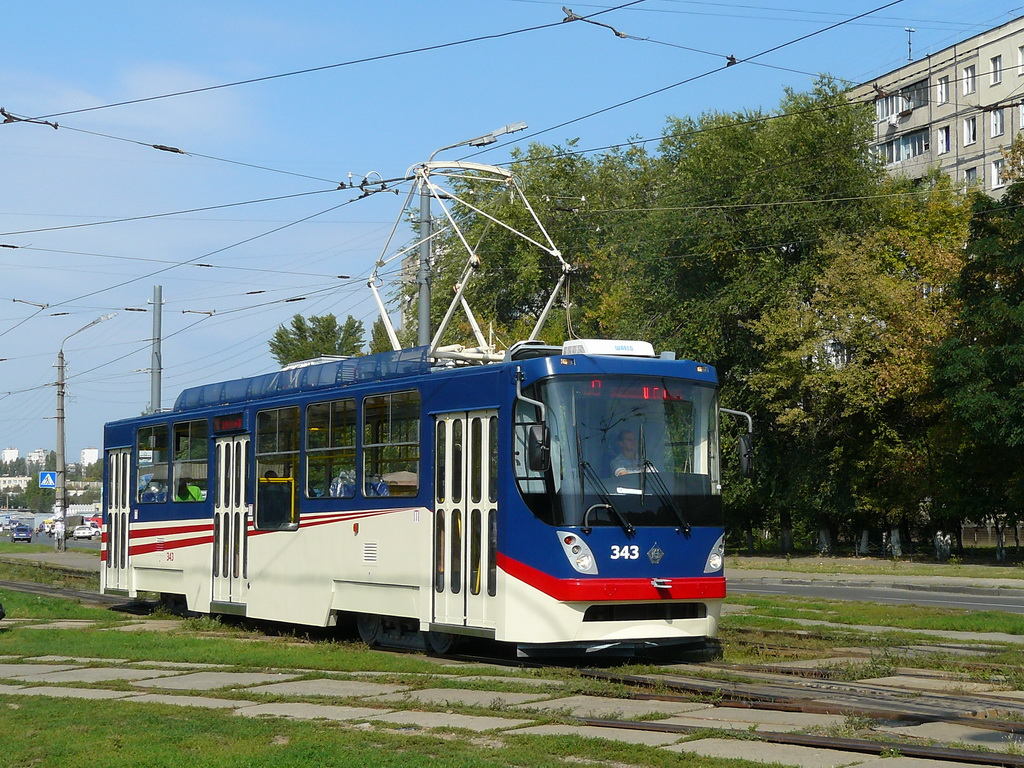
A K-M1 tram which was in operation between 2016 and 2022
