= Nizhnekamsk Cathedral Mosque =

Mosque in Nizhnekamsk, Russia

- Нижнекамская соборная мечеть
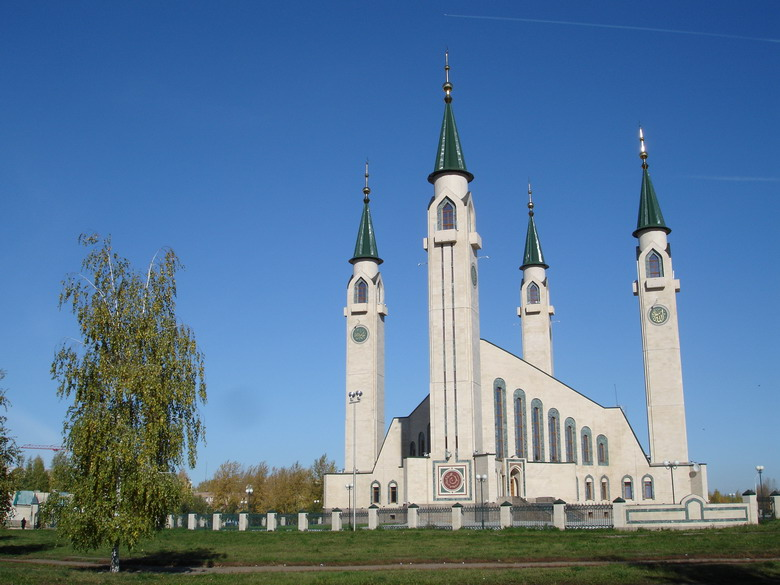

Religion
- Affiliation: Islam

Location
- Location: Nizhnekamsk, Tatarstan
- Country: Russia
- Interactive map of Nizhnekamsk Cathedral Mosque
- Coordinates: 55°38′21″N 51°48′56″E

Architecture
- Type: Mosque

The Nizhnekamsk Cathedral Mosque (Russian: Нижнекамская соборная мечеть «Джамиг») (Tatar: Түбән Кама шәһәре җәмигъ мәчете, Tübən Kama şəhəre cәmiğ məçete) is the central mosque in Nizhnekamsk, Russia.

The cathedral mosque is located in an open square, next to a high-rise residential development. It is a modern religious building with an unconventional spatial composition and stands out for its original appearance: when choosing the architectural design, R. I. Makuev and F. G. Khanov leaned toward modern forms, organic to the city where young people live. This is the first example of a hall, multi-minaret mosque in the territory of Tatarstan.

The total area of the mosque is 2.5 thousand square meters, the area of the main prayer hall is 900 square meters.
