= Nizhnekamsk =

City in Tatarstan, Russia

Nizhnekamsk Нижнекамск
- City

Other transcription(s)
  - Tatar: Түбəн Кама
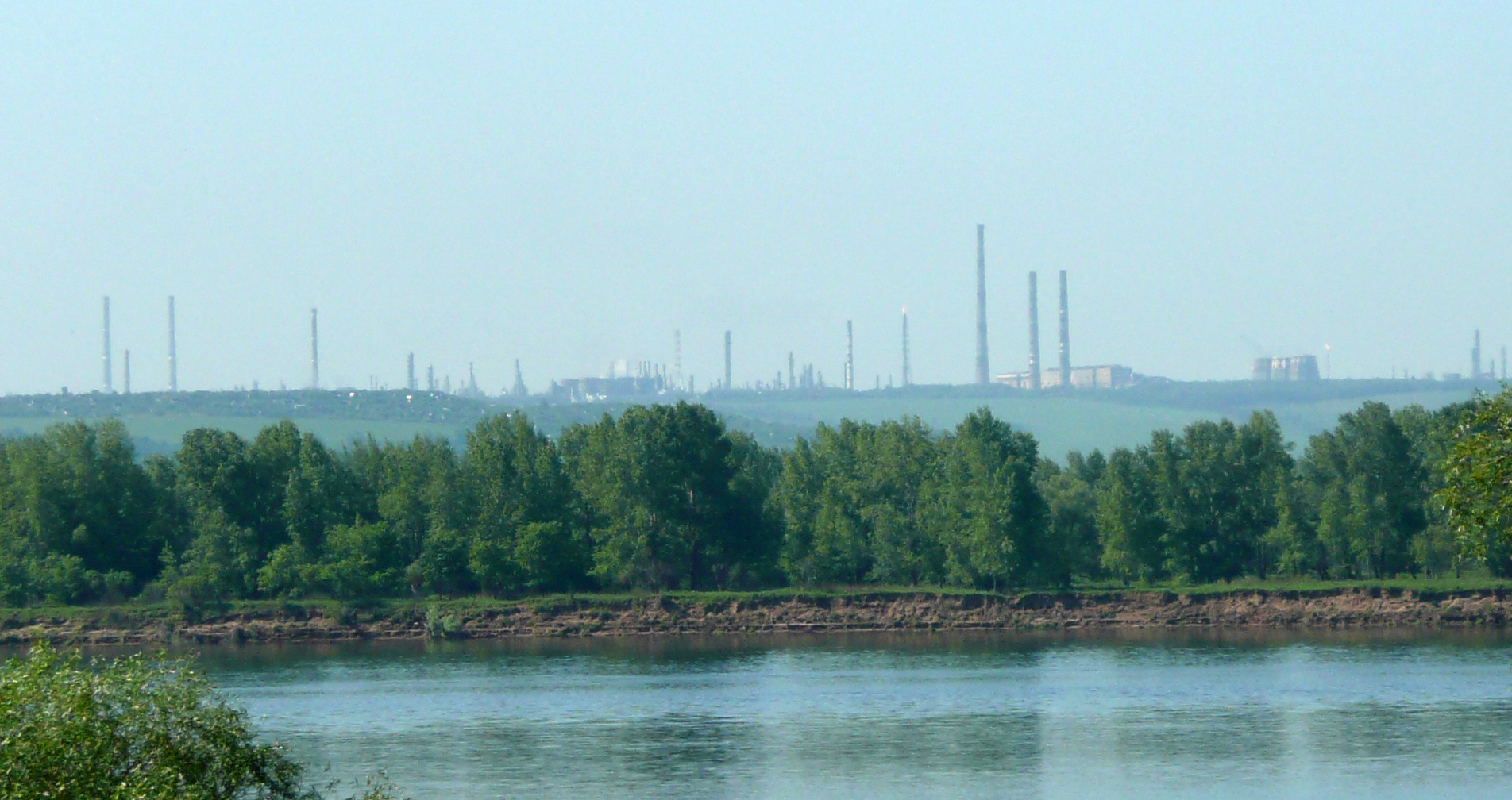
- Skyline

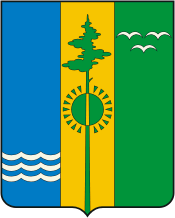
- Flag Coat of arms
- Interactive map of Nizhnekamsk
- Location of Nizhnekamsk Nizhnekamsk (Tatarstan)
- Coordinates: 55°38′N 51°49′E
- Country: Russia
- Federal subject: Tatarstan
- Founded: 1961

Government
  - Mayor: Ramil Mullin(Рамиль Муллин)
- Elevation: 120 m (390 ft)

Population (2010 Census)
  - Total: 234,044
  - Estimate (2025): 240,842 (+2.9%)
  - Rank: 82nd in 2010

Administrative status
  - Subordinated to: city of republic significance of Nizhnekamsk
  - Capital of: city of republic significance of Nizhnekamsk, Nizhnekamsky District

Municipal status
  - Municipal district: Nizhnekamsky Municipal District
  - Urban settlement: Nizhnekamsk Urban Settlement
  - Capital of: Nizhnekamsky Municipal District, Nizhnekamsk Urban Settlement
- Time zone: UTC+3 (MSK)
- Postal code: 423570
- Dialing code: +7 8555
- OKTMO ID: 92644101001

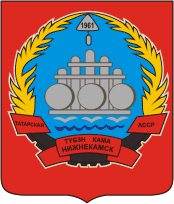
1975 coat of arms of Nizhnekamsk

Nizhnekamsk (Russian: Нижнекамск, IPA: [nʲɪʐnʲɪˈkamsk]; Tatar: Түбән Кама, romanized: Tübän Qama) is the third-largest city in Tatarstan, Russia, located to the south of the Kama River between the cities of Naberezhnye Chelny and Chistopol. Population: 241,479 (2021 census); 234,044 (2010 census); 225,399 (2002 census); 190,793 (1989 Soviet census).

Historical population
Year	Pop.	±%
1970	48,988	—
1979	134,199	+173.9%
1989	190,793	+42.2%
2002	225,399	+18.1%
2010	234,044	+3.8%
2021	241,479	+3.2%
Source: Census data

== Etymology ==
The name in both Russian and Tatar comes from the fact that the city is located in the lower reaches of the Kama River.

== History ==
As its population increased, spurred by the construction of Nizhnekamskneftekhim petrochemical industrial complex, Nizhnekamsk was granted city status in 1966.

A Ukrainian drone attack killed at least 13 people on 10 August 2026, according to local authorities.

== Administrative and municipal status ==
Within the framework of administrative divisions, Nizhnekamsk serves as the administrative center of Nizhnekamsky District, even though it is not a part of it. As an administrative division, it is, together with three rural localities, incorporated separately as the city of republic significance of Nizhnekamsk—an administrative unit with the status equal to that of the districts. As a municipal division, the city of republic significance of Nizhnekamsk is incorporated within Nizhnekamsky Municipal District as Nizhnekamsk Urban Settlement.

== Economy ==
The city is an important center of the petrochemical industry with the Nizhnekamskneftekhim plant. The Tatarstan Oil Refinery Complex is part of the Tatneft concern. The Nizhnekamsk Tire Factory, known for tires called Kama, is also located in the city.

== Transportation ==
Nizhnekamsk and a number of neighboring cities are served by Begishevo airport, there is a railway station Nizhnekamsk Kuibyshev railway, from where suburban electric trains run to Izhevsk via Naberezhnye Chelny and Agryz, where it is possible to transfer to long-distance trains. The railway section from Nizhnekamsk to Naberezhnye Chelny is single-track, but electrified with 25 kV alternating current. The M7 Volga Moscow-Ufa federal highway runs near Nizhnekamsk and the M12 commercial highway with a toll road is under construction. The city also has a marina for motor ships with an equipped river station, from where passenger ships ply in the waters of the Kama and Volga rivers.

=== Tram system of Nizhnekamsk ===
Nizhnekamsk itself has one of Tatarstan's three tram systems, the third largest and the second most prosperous. Despite its decrease during the post-Soviet period, it continues to work normally. The municipal unitary enterprise "Urban Electric Transport" owns the system. The total length of the routes is 63.5 km, and there are currently 4 routes in total.Main types of rolling stock is 71-608, 71-619, 71-623. The system has been operating since February 23, 1967. The system, like most other Soviet-Russian tram systems, operates on direct current of 550 volts.

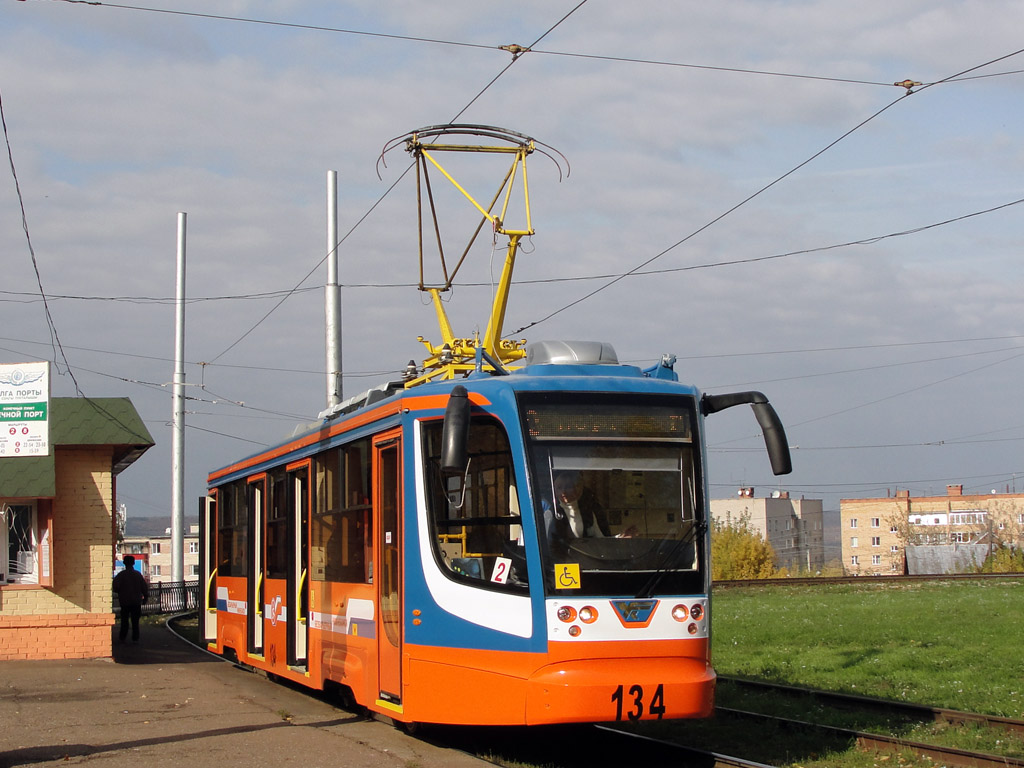
Tram KTM 19 on route No. 2.

== Police and other enforcement agencies ==
The district police department in Nizhnekamsk is part of the Ministry of Internal Affairs of the Republic of Tatarstan and is responsible for the entire Nizhnekamsk district. The district office of the Federal Bailiff Service is also located in Nizhnekamsk. The nearest pre-trial detention center is located in Naberezhnye Chelny and Chistopol, while a correctional colony for prisoners with tuberculosis is located in Nizhnekamsk. There are also several fire stations of the Russian Emergencies Ministry in Nizhnekamsk. There are no significant army units near Nizhnekamsk.

== Demographics ==
Ethnic composition (as of 1989):

- Russians: 47.1%
- Tatars: 46.5%
- Chuvash people: 3.0%
- Ukrainians: 1.0%
- Bashkirs: 1.0%

== Sports ==
HC Neftekhimik Nizhnekamsk is an ice hockey team based in Nizhnekamsk, playing in the Kontinental Hockey League.
