= 71-630 =

71-931
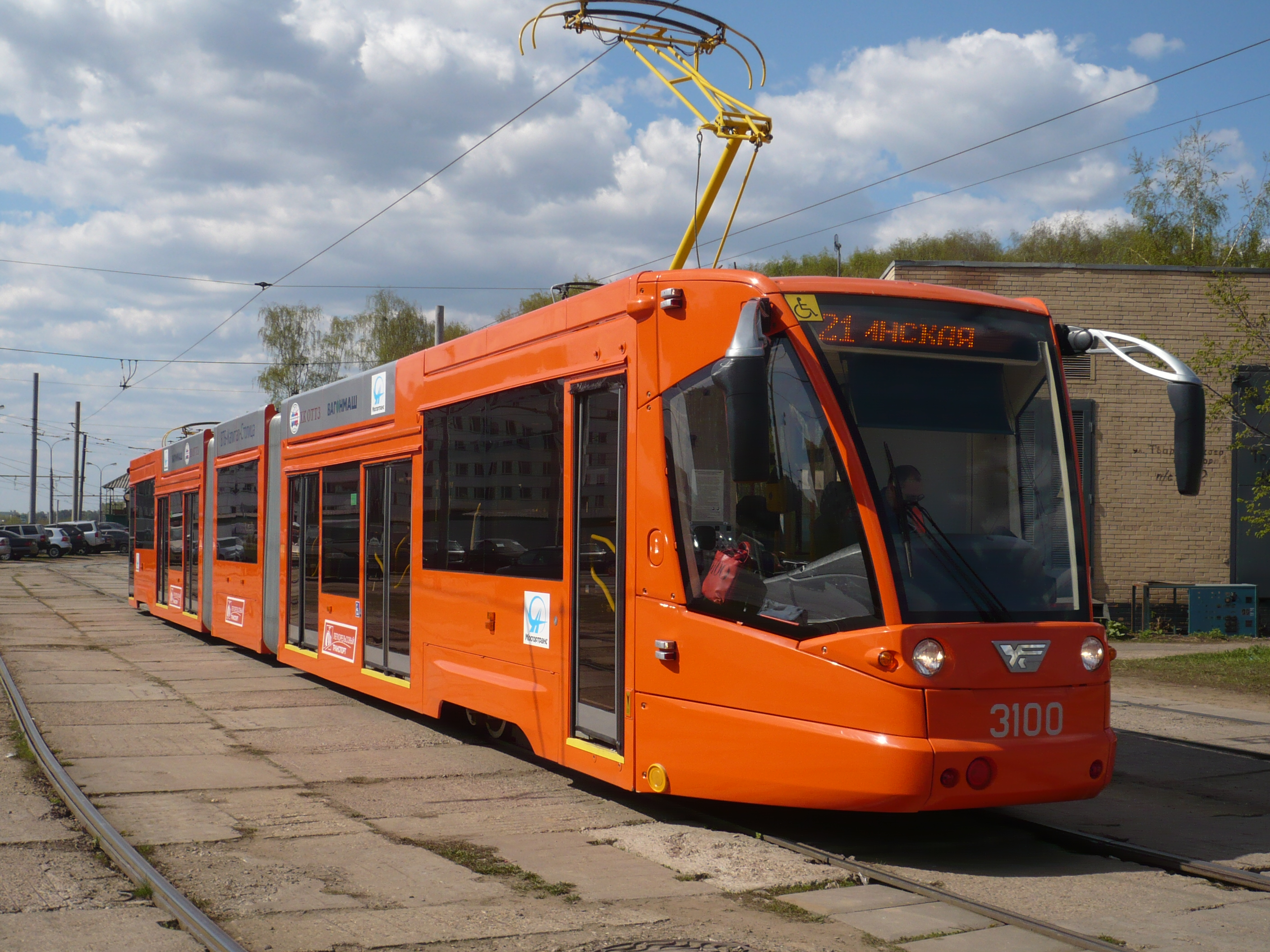
- 71-630 in Moscow

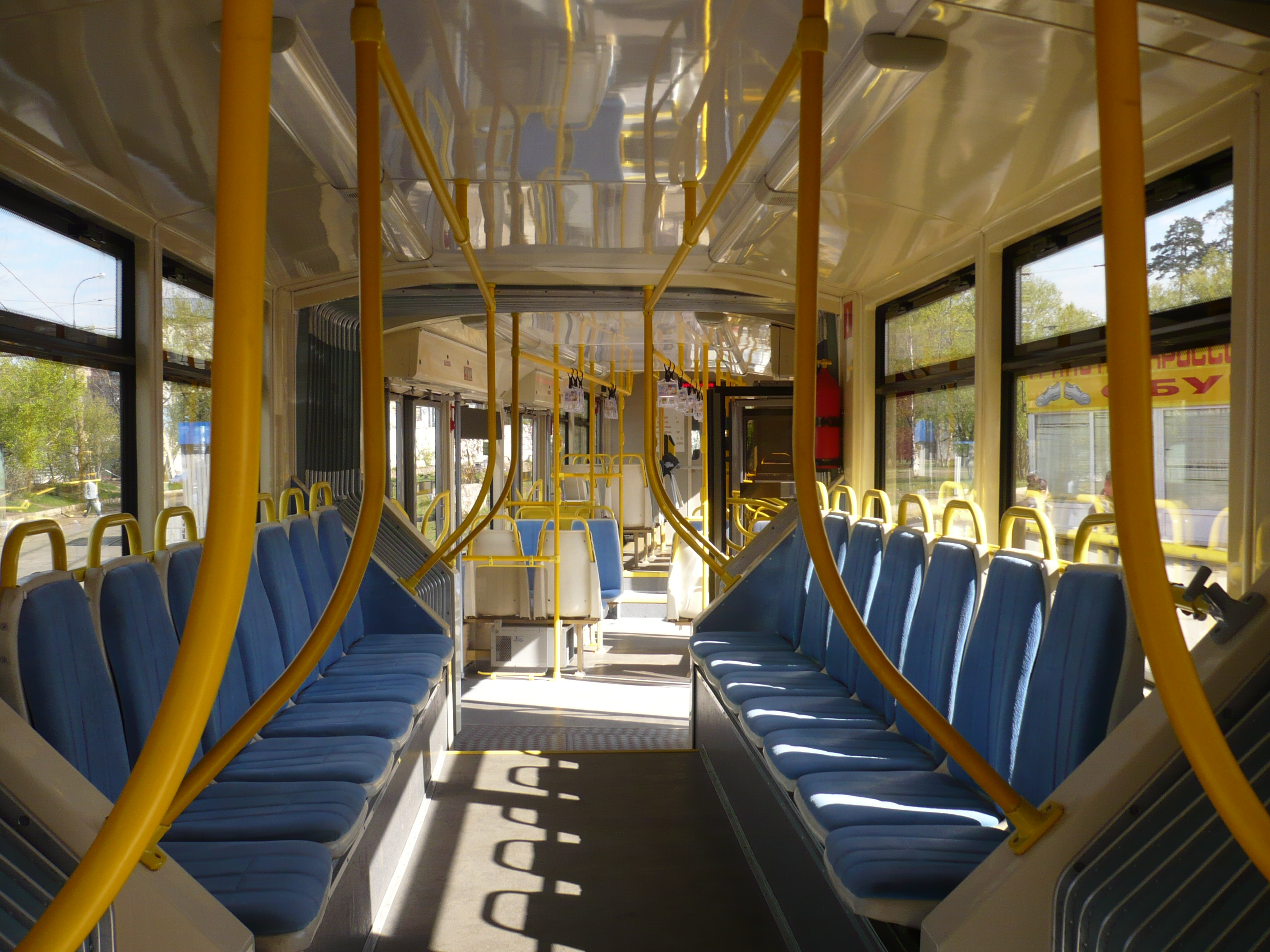
- Interior of 71-630
- Manufacturer: (Russia) UKVZ
- Constructed: 2006
- Number built: 1
- Capacity: 58 seats

Specifications
- Doors: 6
- Power supply: 550 V
- Bogies: 3
- Track gauge: 1,524 mm (5 ft)

The 71-630 is a proposed Russian low floor tram intended for Moscow and Riga. These rail vehicles are produced by Ust'-Katav Vagon-building plant (UKVZ, УКВЗ, Усть-Катавский Вагоностроительный Завод имени С. М. Кирова - Russian abbreviature and full name). Only one car was built in 2006. It was tested with passengers in Moscow in 2008–2010, and stay in Krasnopresnenskoye depot.
