= 71-619 =

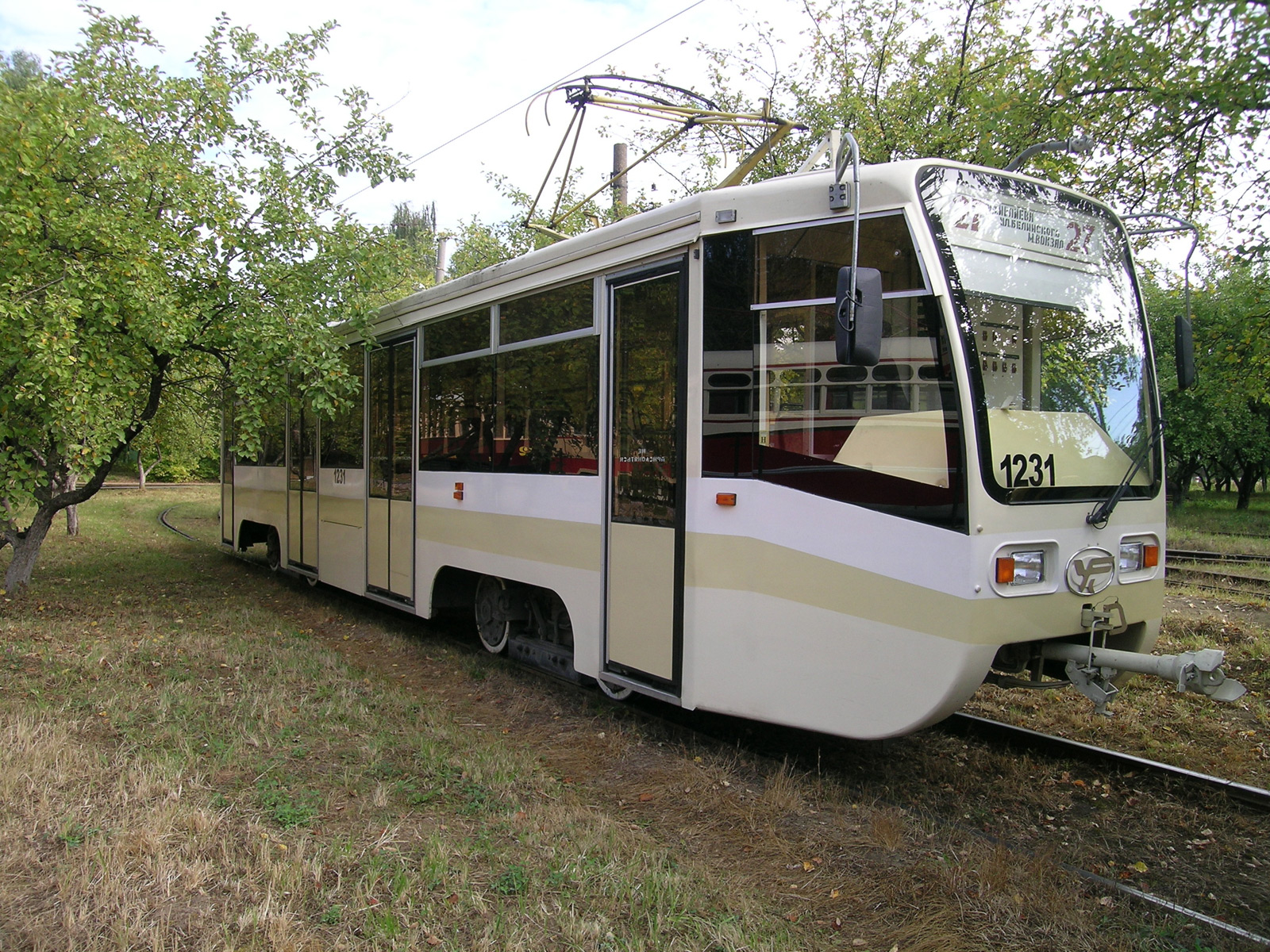
- 71-619 tramcar in Depot No. 1, Nizhny Novgorod, Russia

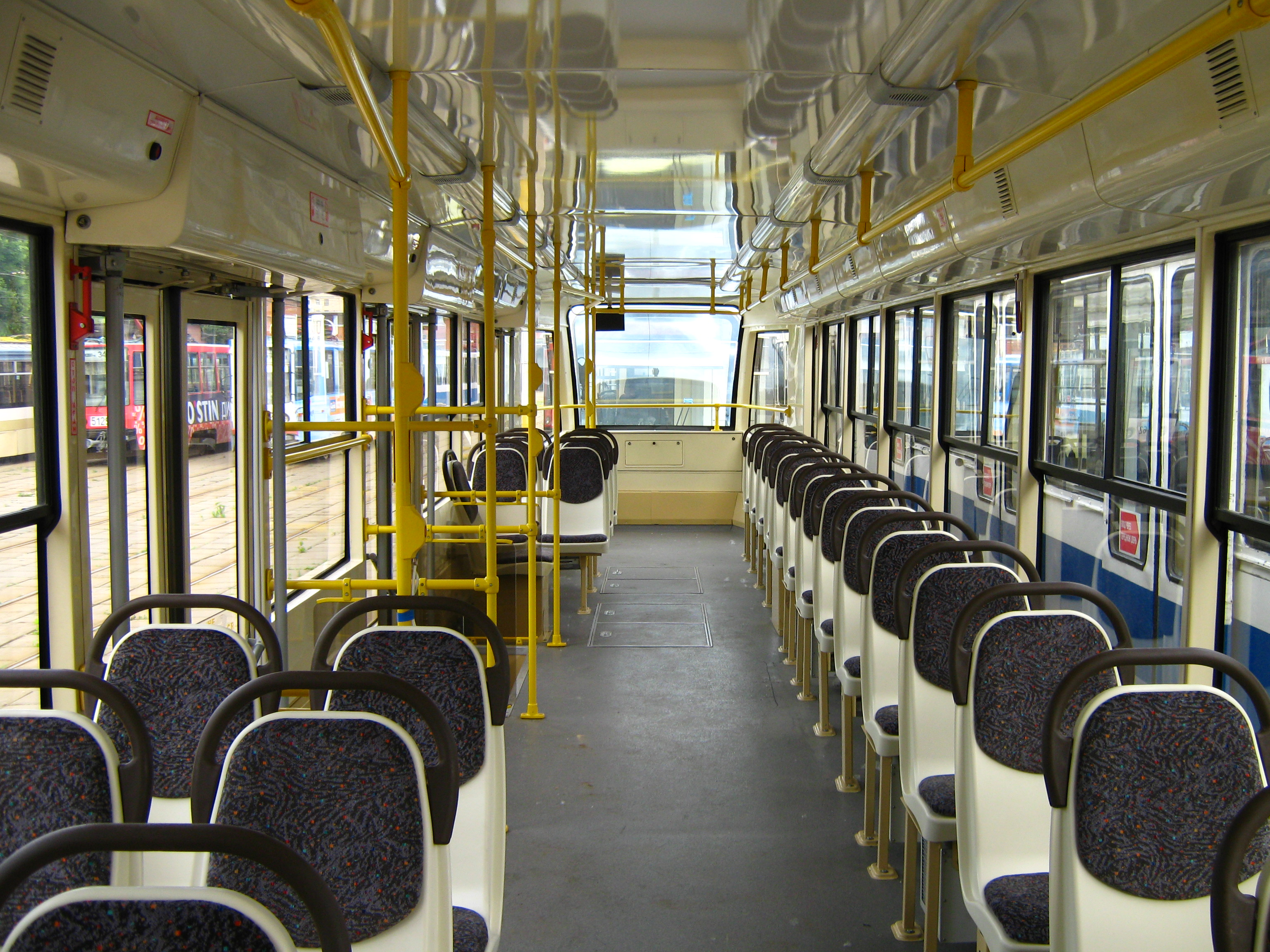
- Interior of 71-619A
- Manufacturer: (Russia) UKVZ
- Constructed: 1999 — 2012
- Number built: 831
- Capacity: 30 seats

Specifications
- Train length: 15,400 mm (50 ft 6 in)
- Width: 2,500 mm (8 ft 2 in)
- Height: 3,850 mm (12 ft 8 in)
- Doors: 4
- Maximum speed: 75 km/h (46.6 mph)
- Power supply: 550 V
- Bogies: 2
- Track gauge: 1,000 mm (3 ft 3 3/8 in); 1,435 mm (4 ft 8 1/2 in); 1,524 mm (5 ft).

The 71-619 (colloquially KTM-19) is the modern Russian four-axle high-floor motor tramcar. These rail vehicles are produced at the Ust'-Katav Wagon-building plant (Russian: UKVZ, УКВЗ, Усть-Катавский Вагоностроительный Завод имени С. М. Кирова - Russian abbreviation and full name). "KTM" means Kirov Motor Tramcar (Russian: Кировский Трамвай Моторный). This abbreviation was the producer's official trademark before 1976, when a new designation system for tram and subway rolling stock was introduced in the Soviet Union. The abandoned the KTM trademark still lives in everyday conversations of Russian tram workers and enthusiasts.

== See also ==
- Tram
