= Ust-Katav Wagon-Building Plant =

Railroad carriage works in Ust-Katav, Chelyabinsk Oblast, Russia

- Native name: ФГУП "УКВЗ"
- Type: Federal State Unitary Enterprise
- Industry: Tramcars and Light rail
- Founded: 1758
- Headquarters: Ust-Katav, Russia
- Area served: CIS and Eastern Europe
- Parent: Roscosmos
- Website: www.ukvz.ru

The Ust-Katav Wagon-Building Plant, officially the Ust-Katavskiy Carriage Works named after S. M. Kirov (Russian: Усть-Катавский вагоностроительный завод имени С. М. Кирова, romanized: Ust'-Katavskiy Vagonostroitel'nyy Zavod imeni S. M. Kirova) is a railroad carriage works in Ust-Katav, Chelyabinsk Oblast, Russia.

From 1947 to the end of the 20th century (before the series KTM-8), the factory built trams under the brand name KТМ, which is often used as an informal designation for subsequent models with digital items (e.g. tram 71-619 is also known as KTM-19).

== History ==
The factory was founded in 1758.

The plant built streetcars (trams) from 1901. The first tram was made for Tbilisi. In 1960, a special design bureau for streetcar transport design was established, and about 20 streetcar models were developed. The plant set a world record for producing one type of vehicle — the KTM-5, of which 14,991 units were produced.

Currently, the plant produces low-floor trams of different variations of models 71-623 and 71-631. In 2006, the plant built its first 71-630 low-floor articulated trams (tested in Moscow). In 2009, UKVZ offered two 71-623 partial low-floor, single-section vehicles for trial operation in Ufa and Nizhny Novgorod. In 2010, additional trams of these models were built for Moscow, Perm, Nizhnekamsk and Krasnodar. The plant also produces trim spare parts and provides tram maintenance services.

In addition to streetcars, the plant produces gas pressure regulators, pipeline valves, pumps and consumer goods.

By Presidential Decree of the Russian Federation number 772 of June 11, 2011, and Federal Decree number 1159-r of July 7, 2011, the Federal State Enterprise Ust-Katavsky Automobile Production Plant Kirov was renamed a branch of the Khrunichev State Research and Production Space Center.

In 2025 the design for a single section double-decker tram was unveiled. The car will be 16.8 m in length and 5.4 m in height.

== Products ==
- H/M (1937–1941), two-axle tram. Production of this model was transferred from Mytishchi machine-building factory (now "Metrovagonmash"), where it was produced since 1927.
- KTM-1/KTP-1 (1947–1961), two-axle tram with all-metal monocoque body.
- KTM-2/KTP-2 (1958–1969), two-axle tram with a metal body.
- KTM-5 (71-605; 1969–1992), four-axle tram with single-leaf sliding doors. Nearly 15,000 cars of this type were built, which allowed them to become the most widely produced tramcar in the world. They have been used in many tram systems in Russia are the only type of rolling stock in some of them.
- 71-608 (KTM-8; 1988–2007), four-axle tram. The tram KTM-8 is used in many Russian cities, as well as the CIS. In Moscow, it still remains one of the most common types of rolling stock.
- 71-611 (KTM-11, 1992–1995) - Russian passenger double sided (doors on both sides, designed for traction in the backs of cars multiple-unit train control) tram car with the body of the 71-608 is designed for use on light-rail lines.
- 71-619 (KTM-19; 1999–2012), four-axle tram. Used in many Russian cities, as well as in the countries of the CIS.
- 71-623 (71-623; from 2009), four-axle tram with a variable level of the floor.
- 71-630
- 71-631 (from 2011), six-axle articulated three-section tram. At the moment, six cars have been built; they are operated in St. Petersburg.
- 71-633
- 71-628 (from 2021), four-axle fully low floor tram.

== Gallery ==
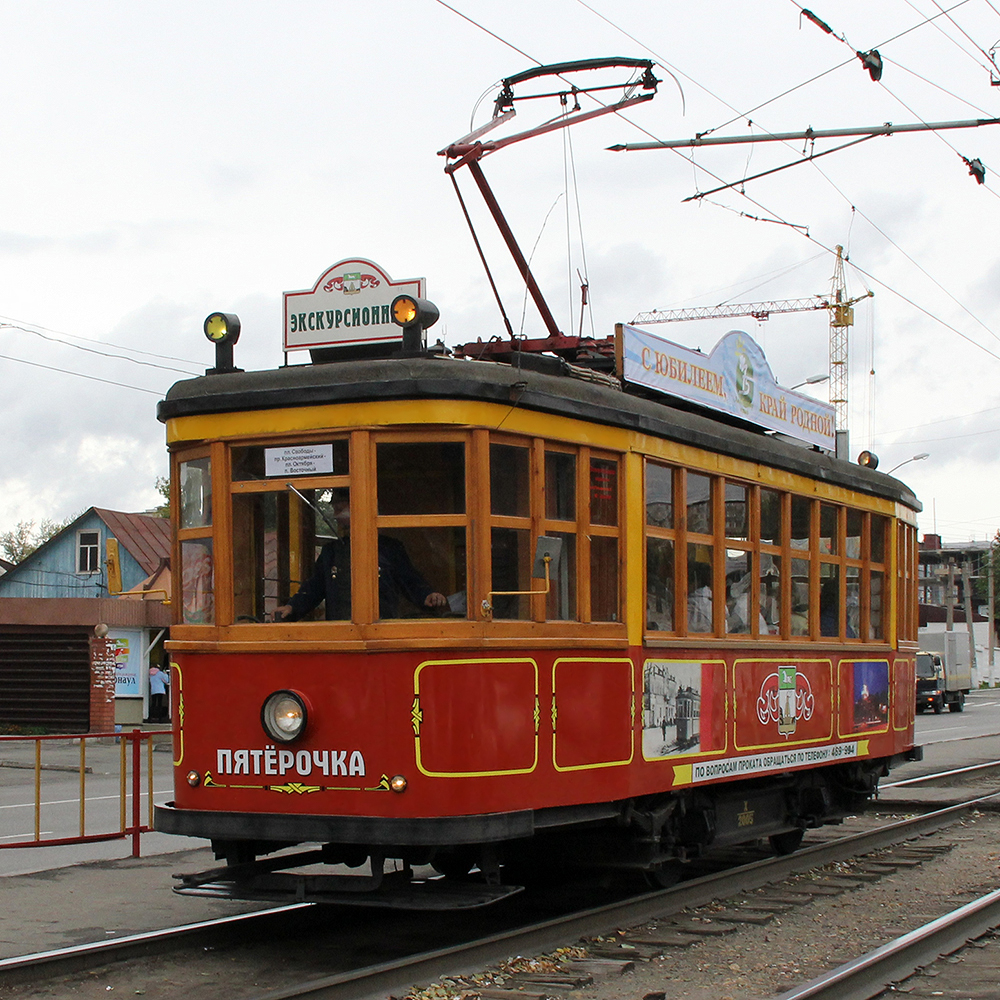
X-Series museum wagon in Barnaul

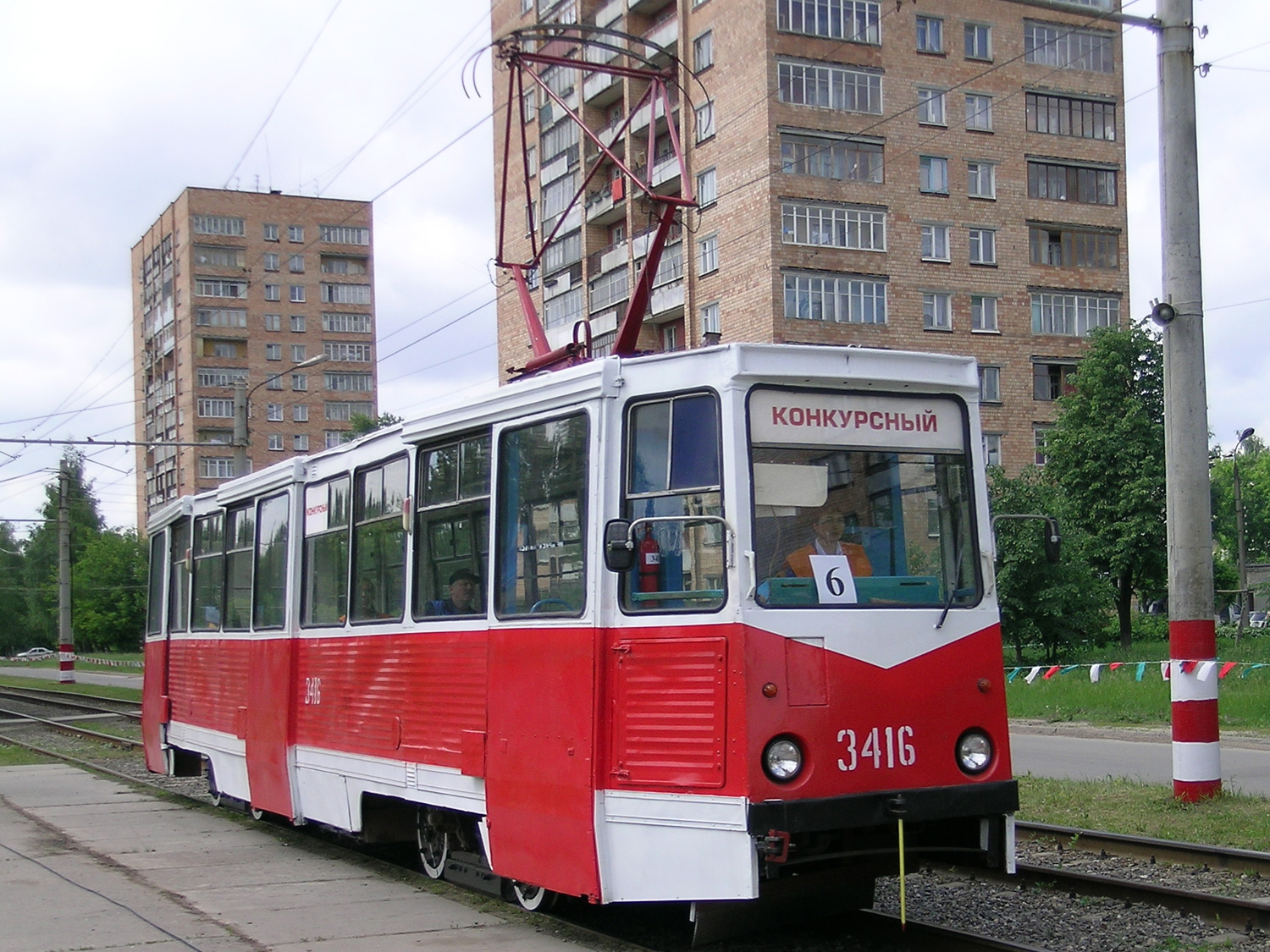
71-605 (KTM-5) tram in Nizhny Novgorod, Russia

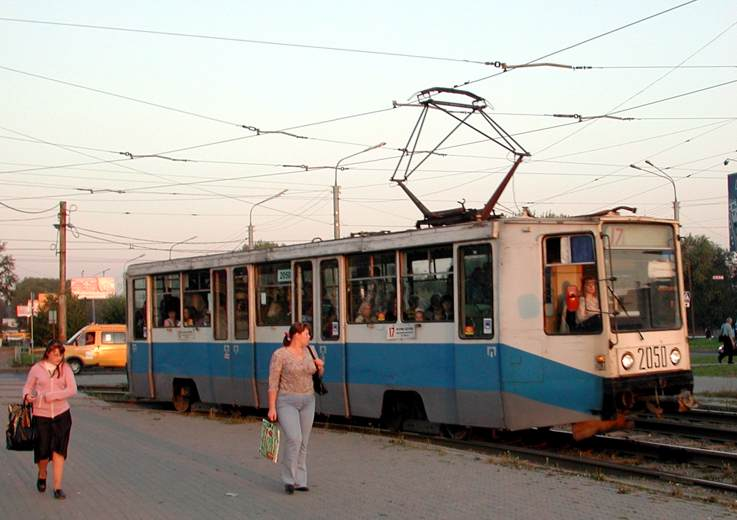
Tram 71-608K. Chelyabinsk

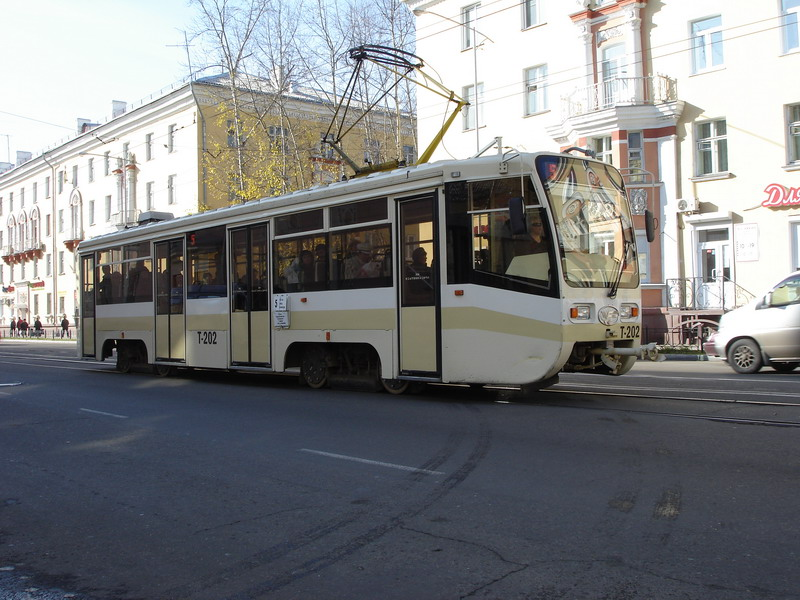
Tram 71–619 in Angarsk

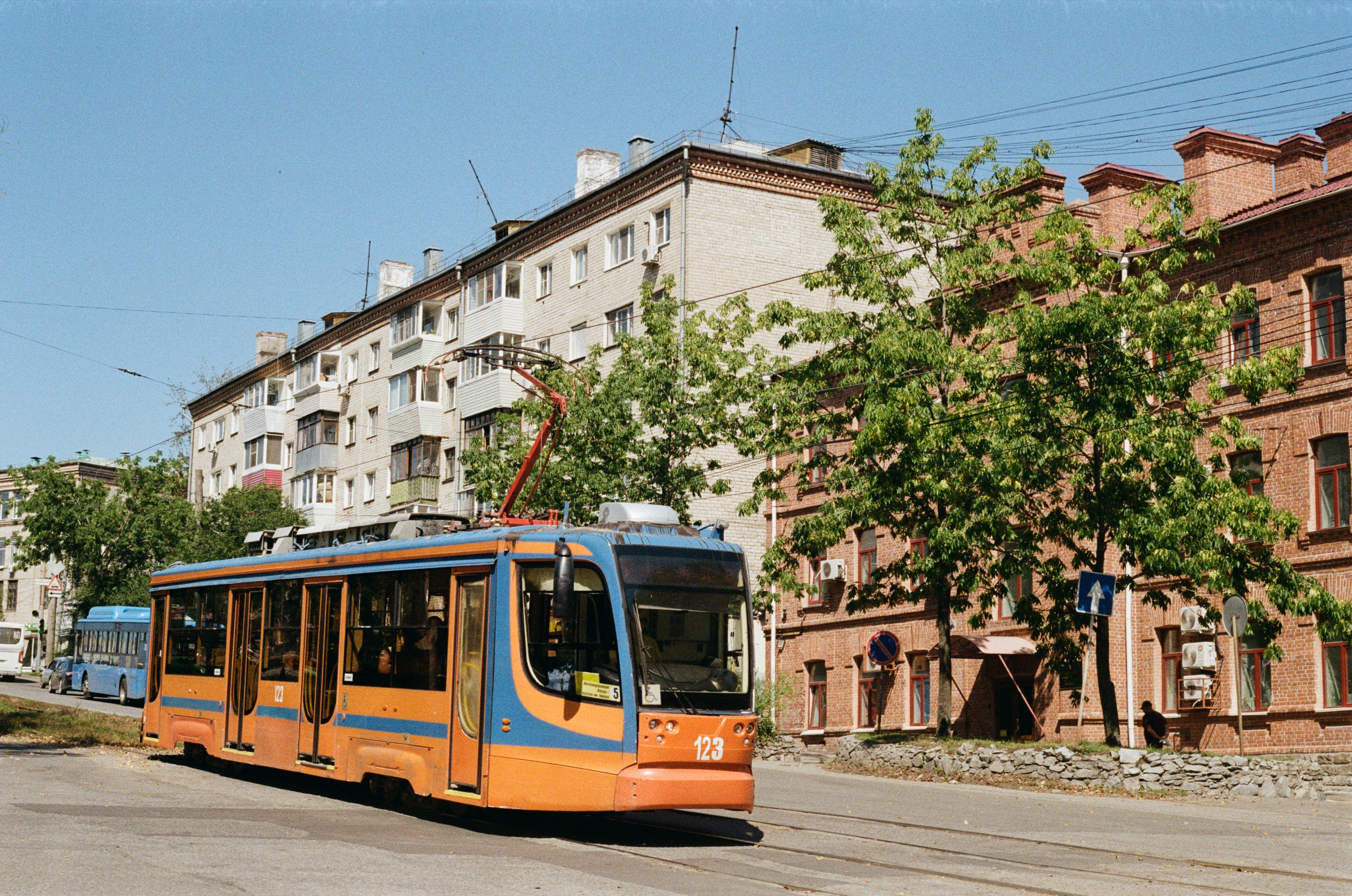
Tram 71–623 in Khabarovsk

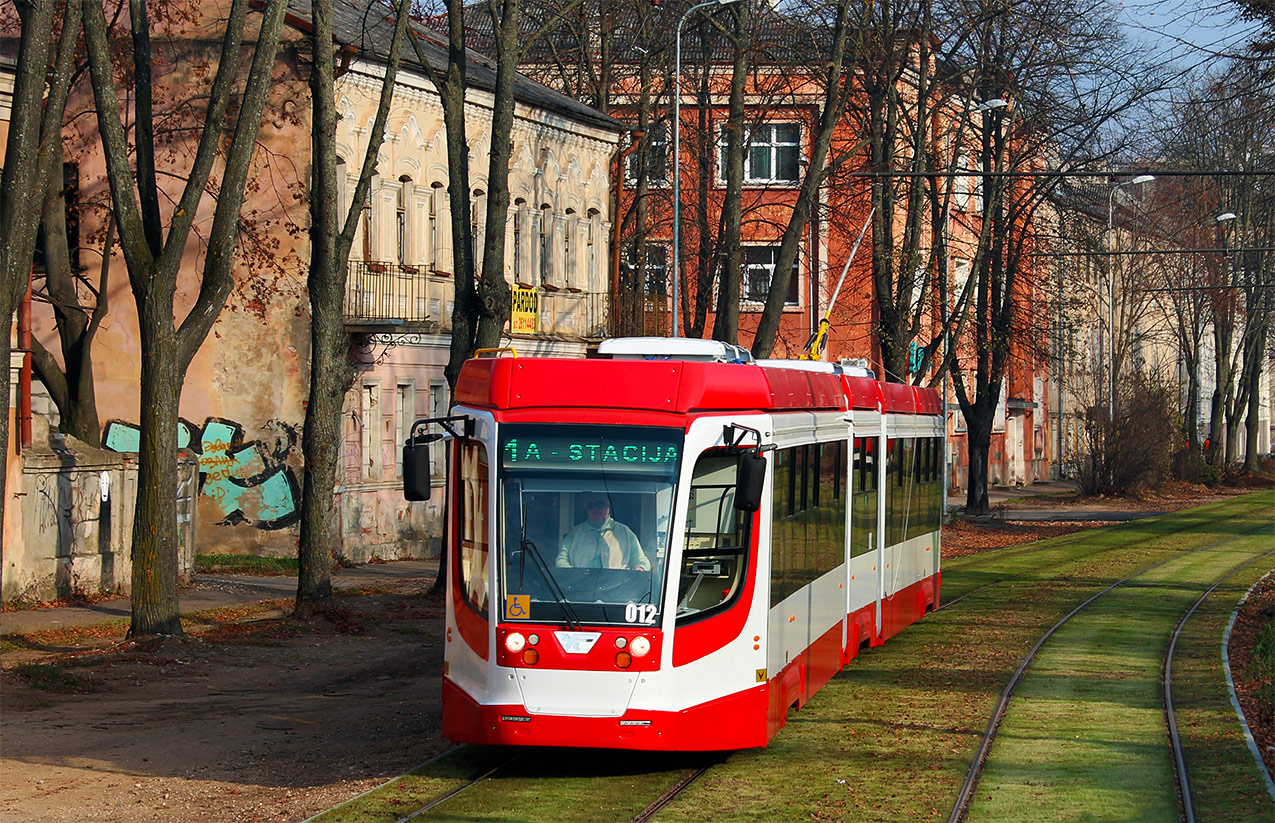
71-631 tram in Daugavpils
