= KTM/KTP-1 =

Soviet tram

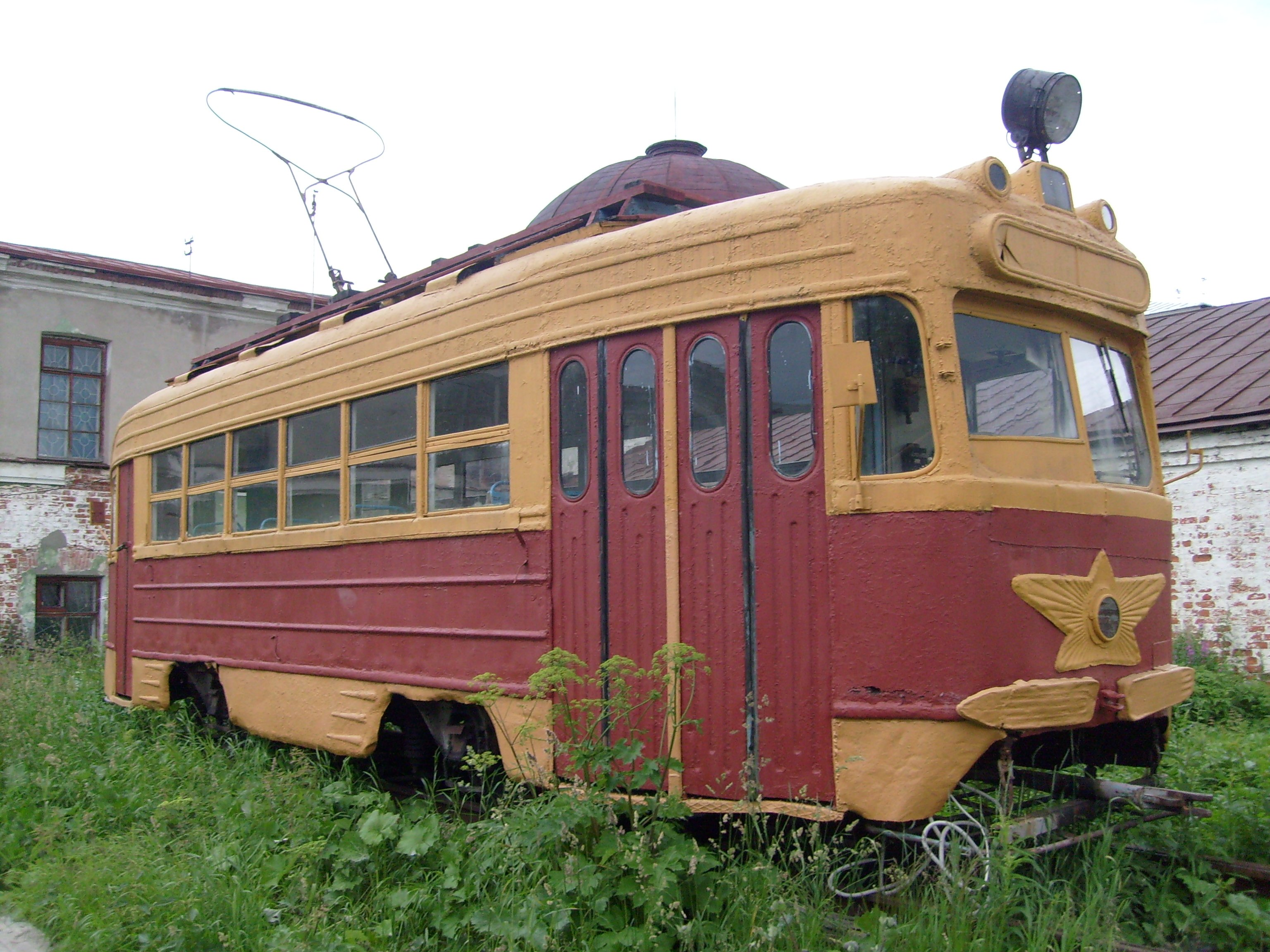
- Tram-monument in Arkhangelsk
- Manufacturer: (Soviet Union) UKVZ
- Constructed: 1947-1961
- Number built: ≈2280
- Capacity: 16 seats

Specifications
- Train length: 10,200 mm (33 ft 6 in); 10,230 mm (33 ft 7 in)
- Width: 2,530 mm (8 ft 4 in)
- Height: 3,060 mm (10 ft 0 in)
- Doors: 4
- Maximum speed: 40 km/h (24.9 mph)
- Electric system(s): 600 V
- Bogies: 2
- Track gauge: 1,524 mm (5 ft)

KTM-1 is a Soviet-made two-axle tram with a metal body. KTP-1 is a two-axle trailer car to intended to work under KTM-1 traction. It was the first Soviet-made tram to be originally single ended, as well as designated to work on looped (not dead-end) lines. It was the first Soviet-made tram with wide four-segment folding doors and bigger passenger storage spaces. Doors were driven pneumatically.

== History ==
KTM/KTP1 development began after World War II. The production of experimental KTM/KTP-1 trams began in December 1947 in a tram manufacturing plant in Ust' Katavsk City. In the next year, the plant started serial production of the trams. Production lasted until 1961, when the plant switched to the production more modern KTM/KTP-2 trams.

== Usage ==
The KTM/KTP1 operated in most Soviet cities. In the Russian Federation cities without the KTM/KTP-1 were Zlatoust, Kolomna, Kopeysk, Kursk, Leningrad, Noginsk, Smolensk, and Yekaterinburg.

== Design ==
Museum tram KTM-1+KTP-1 in Moscow (2023)

KTM/KTP1 was a transitional stage between pre-war and post-war tram developments. Unlike the majority of pre-war trams, the КТМ/КТП-1 featured a solid metal body. But, like pre-war trams, they rode on two axles and were designed as motor-trailer pairs. Later, people refused to use two-axle trams and tram production changed so all new trams were equipped with bogies. The articulated trams, as well as multiple-unit systems came into use on high-use segments.

KTM/KTP-1 trams started to be removed from passenger service by the middle of the 1970s. In Ukrainian cities of Zaporizhzhia and Odesa, Ukraine, KTM/KTP1 were in service till 1986.

The body of the tram is continuous welded metal. The frame and the coating are the main carrying elements. The doors are single segment, set on the right side only. The tram was designed for wide gauge tracks, as found in the USSR (1,524 mm (5 ft)). However, in Rostov-Na-Donu, KTM/KTP-1 were rebuilt for European rail gauge (1,435 mm (4 ft 8 1/2 in)).

The tramcar was driven by DK-254А engines, with a power of 50 kW (67 hp). A two-step reductor was used as a power transmission from a traction motor to the leading wheel pair. In the rear wheel pair a two step reductor with a kardan of an automobile type was in use. The tram was driven using the fist-like controller МТ-22 or МТ-1. The tram collected electric power by a bugel, however in Rostov-na-Donu trolley poles were used. The brakes and doors were pneumatic. A special valve caused the tram to come a full stop if a multiple unit was broken. It was also equipped with a hand brake.

Due to high use on some routes, three and four car tram couples were used. This was done since KTM/KTP1 trams were not intended to work as multiple traction systems. In these cases the motor circuits of two tramcars are combined into one, and everything was done as in 4-car units.

The low level of comfort is a major fault of the tram. Tram seats were wooden. Since the car-base of the tram was not perfect, the tram squealed while making turns. Compressors were noisy.

КТМ-1 and the American-made PCC trolley had a similar external appearance, but were otherwise unrelated. PCC trolleys had boogies, while КТМ-1 was a double-axle tram. The control system of KTM-1 was also different.
