= 71-623 =

Tram built by UKVZ

- A 71-623-03 in Saint Petersburg
- Manufacturer: UKVZ
- Family name: 71-623
- Entered service: 2009
- Number built: 425
- Number in service: 349
- Number scrapped: 3

Specifications
- Car length: 16.4 m (53 ft 10 in)
- Width: 2.5 m (8 ft 2 in)
- Height: 3.7 m (12 ft 2 in)
- Low-floor: 40% low floor
- Wheelbase: 1,940 mm (76 in)
- Maximum speed: 75 km/h (47 mph)
- Weight: 22,000 kg (48,502 lb)
- Power output: 200 kW
- Electric system(s): 550-720V DC
- Track gauge: 1,524 mm (5 ft); 1,000 mm (3 ft 3 3/8 in)

The 71-623 is a 40% low floor, one way tram built by Ust-Katav Wagon-Building Plant. Construction completed in November 2008, under the contract to Mosgortrans which was created in January 2008. Since then, it has been exported to Kazakhstan, Ukraine and Latvia.

== Design ==
As modern, low floor tram cars became more widespread, UKVZ decided to create their own low floor model, the 71-623. To achieve the low floor design, a new bogie was built and assigned the model 630.0.01. These bogies have a two-stage suspension, and hydraulic vibration dampers are installed to improve ride quality. UKVZ's implementation of bogies allows for a lower high floor level when compared to Uraltransmash 71-407. The vehicles use asynchronous motors and transistor control. Before the 71-623-04 modification, the cars feature no passenger air conditioning by default and it was installed only for the driver and cars were painted in bright colours. The car has the capability to work in multiple units.

== Variants ==
=== 71-623-00 ===
These are the first series of vehicles, currently in service in Perm, Smolensk, Khabarovsk, Ufa and Nizhny Novgorod. Three trams of this series were withdrawn. Out of the three, two caught fire and were never restored.

71-623-01

The -01 modification features widened doors, redesigned gearboxes and covered bogies.

=== 71-623-02 ===
The -02 modification features upgraded bogies and was first built in 2011. The 71-623-02.01 modification uses upgraded electrical equipment from LLC Chergos while the 71-623-02.02 modification uses different electrical equipment from JSC 'EPRO'.

71-623-03

The -03 modification uses electrical equipment from LLC Chergos and has doors on both sides of the carriage with 3 doors on the left and 4 on the right. The 71-623-03.01 modification uses electrical equipment from JSC 'EPRO'.

71-623-04

The -04 modification features a redesigned interior and exterior, such as USB charging sockets. These vehicles have passenger air conditioners by default. They use electrical equipment from JSC 'ASK'. The -04 modification can also run for 1 km autonomously, without wires. The 71-623-04.01 modification uses electrical equipment from Chergos, and are being delivered to Chelyabinsk.
