= Ust-Katav =

Ust-Katav Усть-Катав
- Town
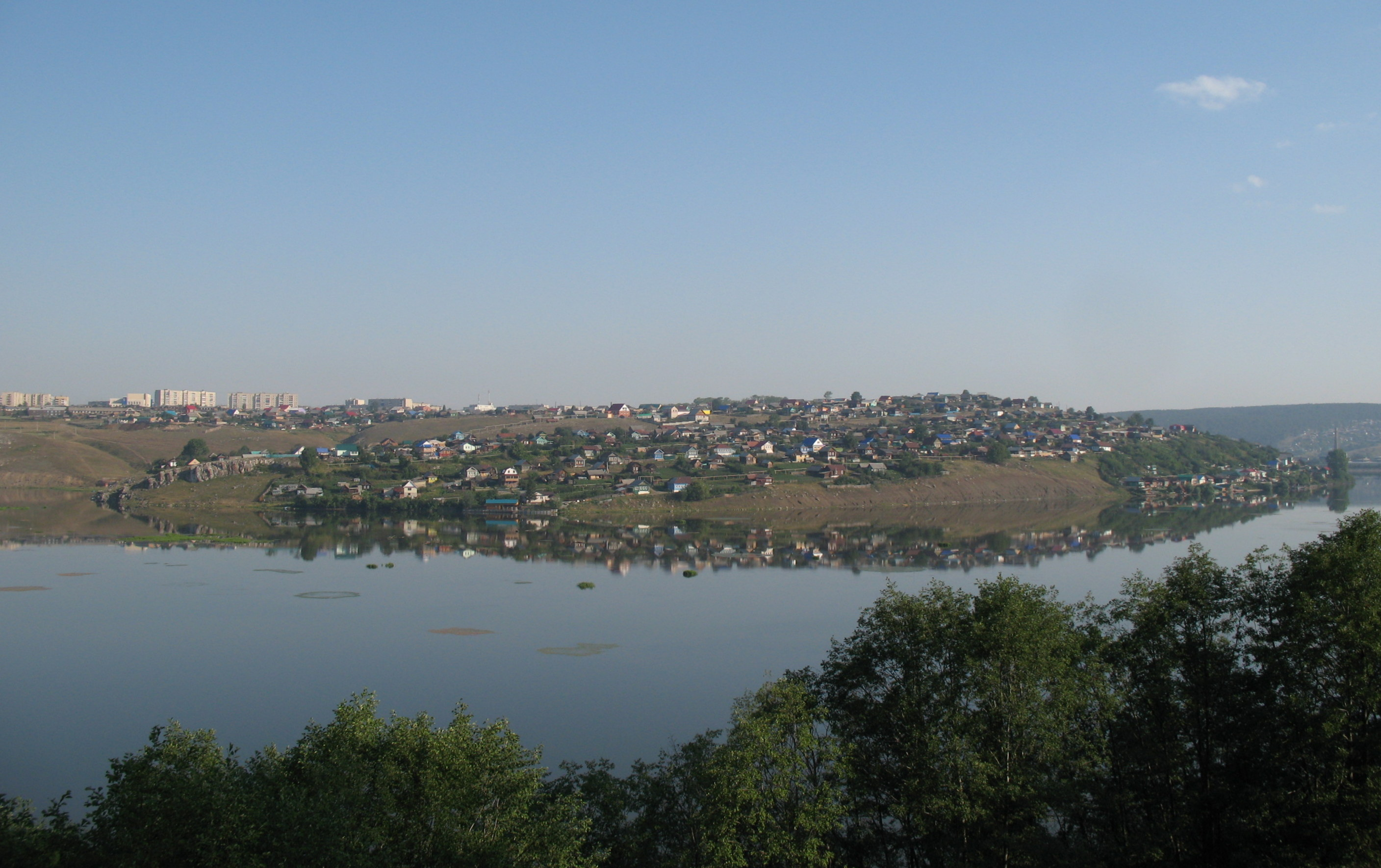
- Ust-Katav from Katav pond

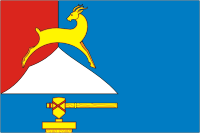
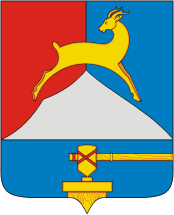
- Flag Coat of arms
- Interactive map of Ust-Katav
- Location of Ust-Katav Ust-Katav (Chelyabinsk Oblast)
- Coordinates: 54°56′N 58°11′E
- Country: Russia
- Federal subject: Chelyabinsk Oblast
- Founded: 1758
- Elevation: 371 m (1,217 ft)

Population (2010 Census)
  - Total: 23,580
  - Estimate (2023): 21,016 (−10.9%)

Administrative status
  - Subordinated to: Town of Ust-Katav
  - Capital of: Town of Ust-Katav

Municipal status
  - Urban okrug: Ust-Katavsky Urban Okrug
  - Capital of: Ust-Katavsky Urban Okrug
- Time zone: UTC+5 (MSK+2)
- Postal code: 456040–456044
- OKTMO ID: 75755000001
- Website: www.ukgo.su

Ust-Katav (Russian: Усть-Ката́в) is a town in Chelyabinsk Oblast, Russia, located on the Yuryuzan River. Population: 23,580 (2010 census); 25,898 (2002 census); 31,218 (1989 Soviet census).

== Administrative and municipal status ==
Within the framework of administrative divisions, it is, together with ten rural localities, incorporated as the Town of Ust-Katav—an administrative unit with the status equal to that of the districts. As a municipal division, the Town of Ust-Katav is incorporated as Ust-Katavsky Urban Okrug.

== Economy ==
Ust-Katav is best known for its factory UKVZ, which is the production place of the world's most numerous model of streetcar, the KTM-5.

=== Transportation ===
Ust-Katav is situated near the Trans-Siberian Railway, as well as the M5 "Ural" motorway.
