= 71-608 =

Russian tramcar

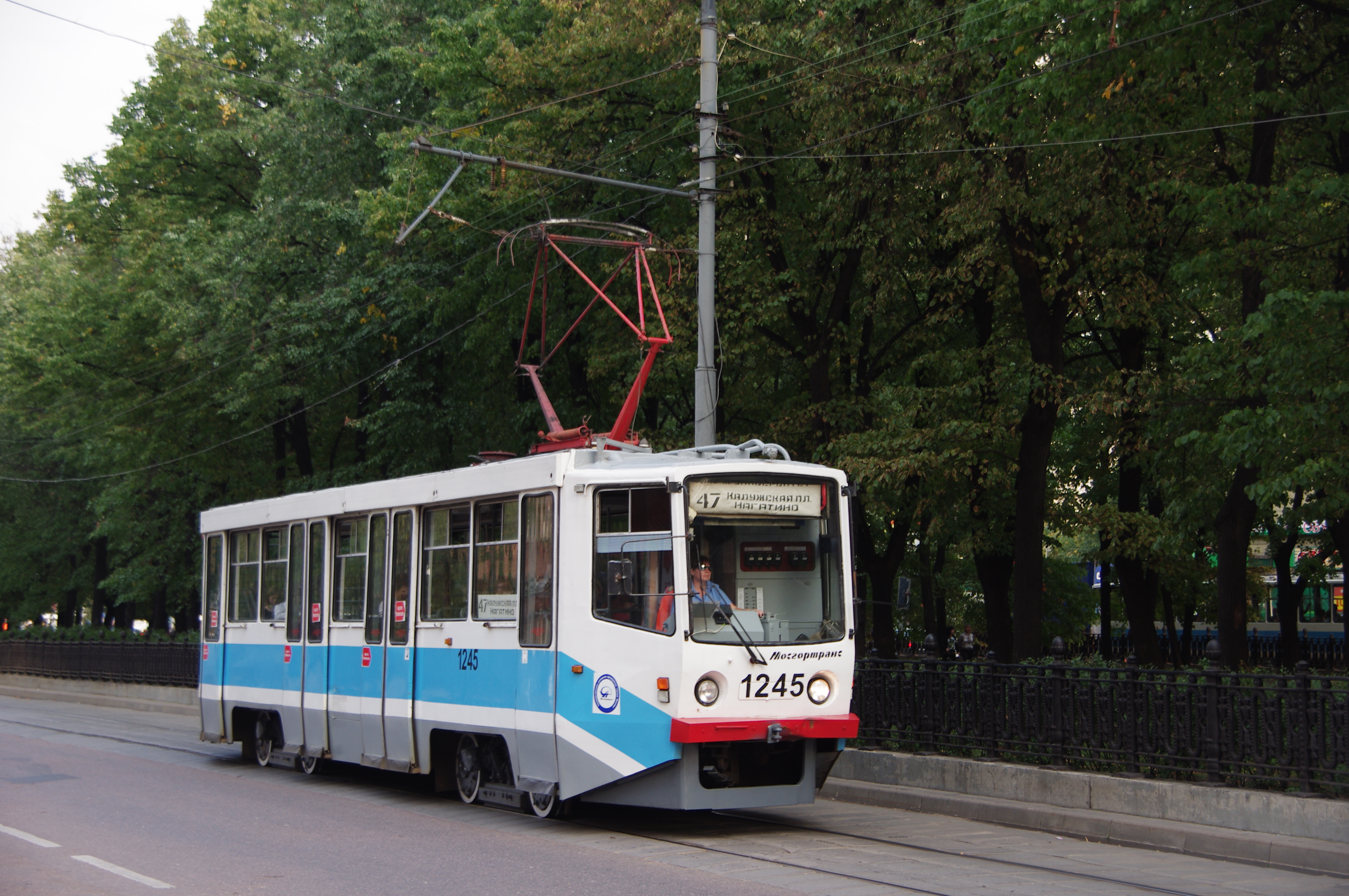
- Mosgortrans 71-608KM model 1997 tramcar.
- Manufacturer: (Soviet Union) / (Russia) UKVZ
- Constructed: 1988 — 2007
- Number built: 1479
- Capacity: 32 seats

Specifications
- Train length: 15,210 mm (49 ft 11 in)
- Width: 2,622 mm (8 ft 7.2 in); 2,500 mm (8 ft 2 in)
- Height: 3,090 mm (10 ft 2 in)
- Doors: 4
- Maximum speed: 75 km/h (46.6 mph)
- Power supply: 400 – 720 V
- Bogies: 2
- Track gauge: 1,000 mm (3 ft 3 3/8 in); 1,524 mm (5 ft).

The 71-608 (in colloquial language KTM-8) is a Russian motor four-axle high-floor tramcar. These rail vehicles are produced by Ust'-Katav Vagon-building plant (UKVZ, УКВЗ, Усть-Катавский Вагоностроительный Завод имени С. М. Кирова - Russian abbreviature and full name). "KTM" means Kirov Motor Tramcar (Russian: Кировский Трамвай Моторный). This abbreviature was producer's official trademark before 1976, when new designation system for tram and subway rolling stock was introduced in the Soviet Union. After official abandoning KTM trademark it still lives in everyday conversations of Russian tram workers and enthusiasts.

== Types ==
- 71-608 - two prototypes from 1988, used in Tver and Moscow. Withdrawn.
- 71-608K - standard model 1991-1993
- 71-608 km - standard model 1993 - 2000s

== Gallery ==
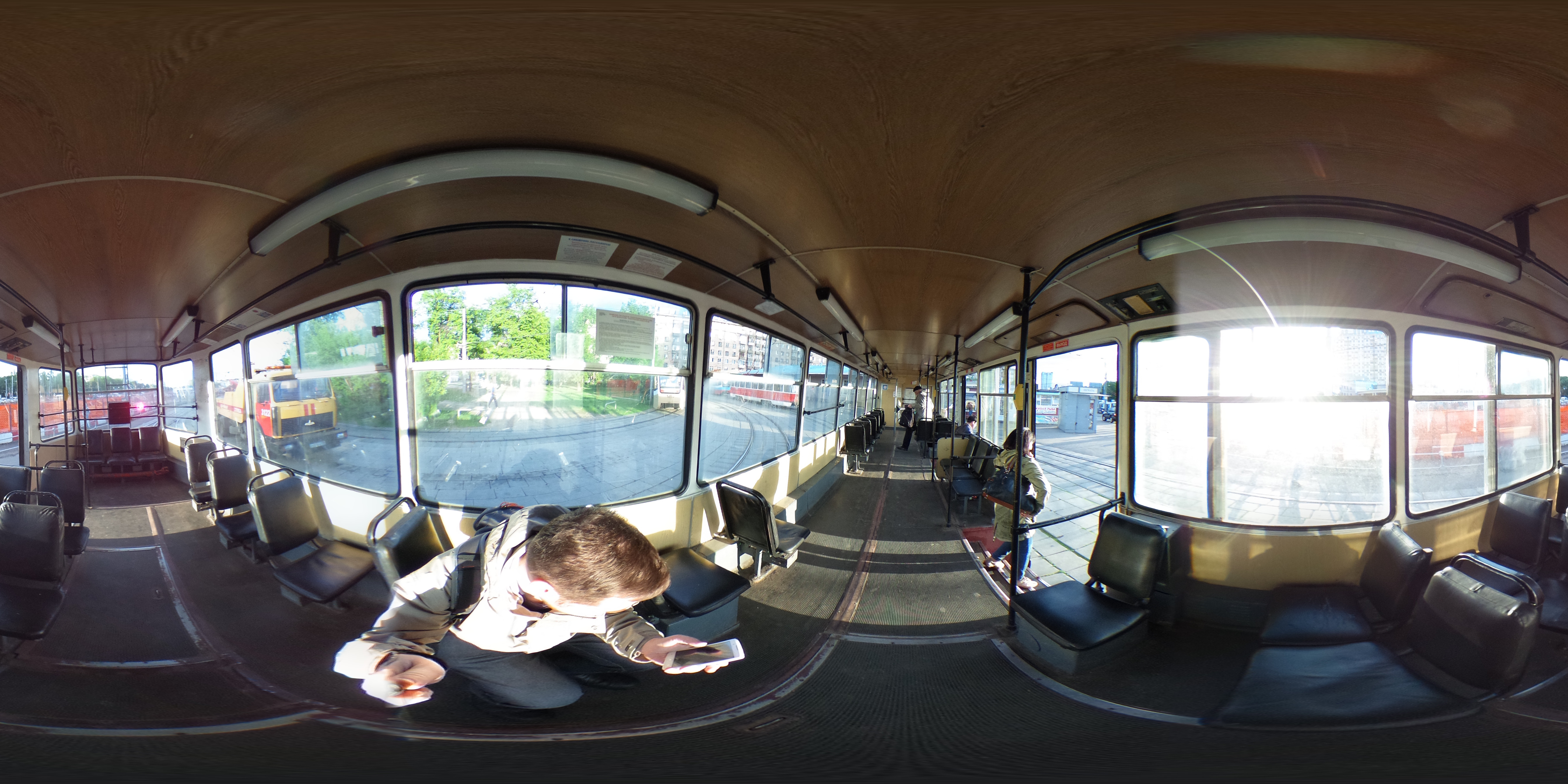
Interior of Mosgortrans 71-608KM tram (view as a 360° interactive panorama)

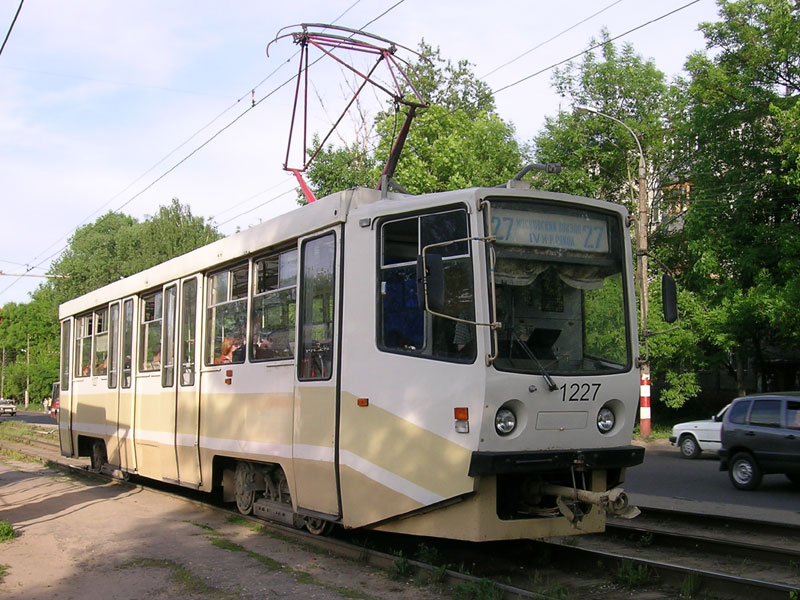
71-608 km model 2004 tramcar in Nizhny Novgorod, Russia. Car from last batches, interior similar to 71-619K model

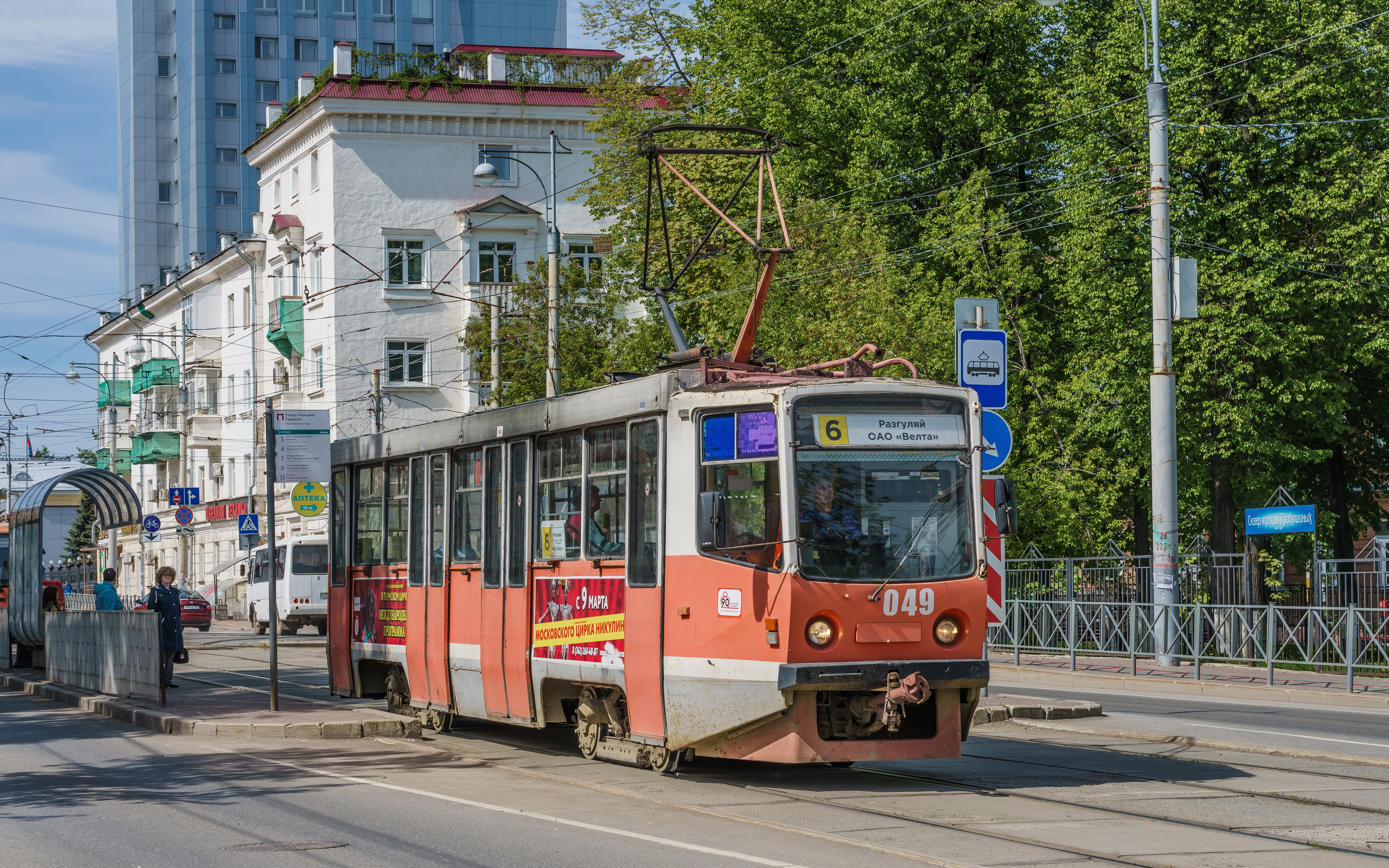
71-608 in Perm

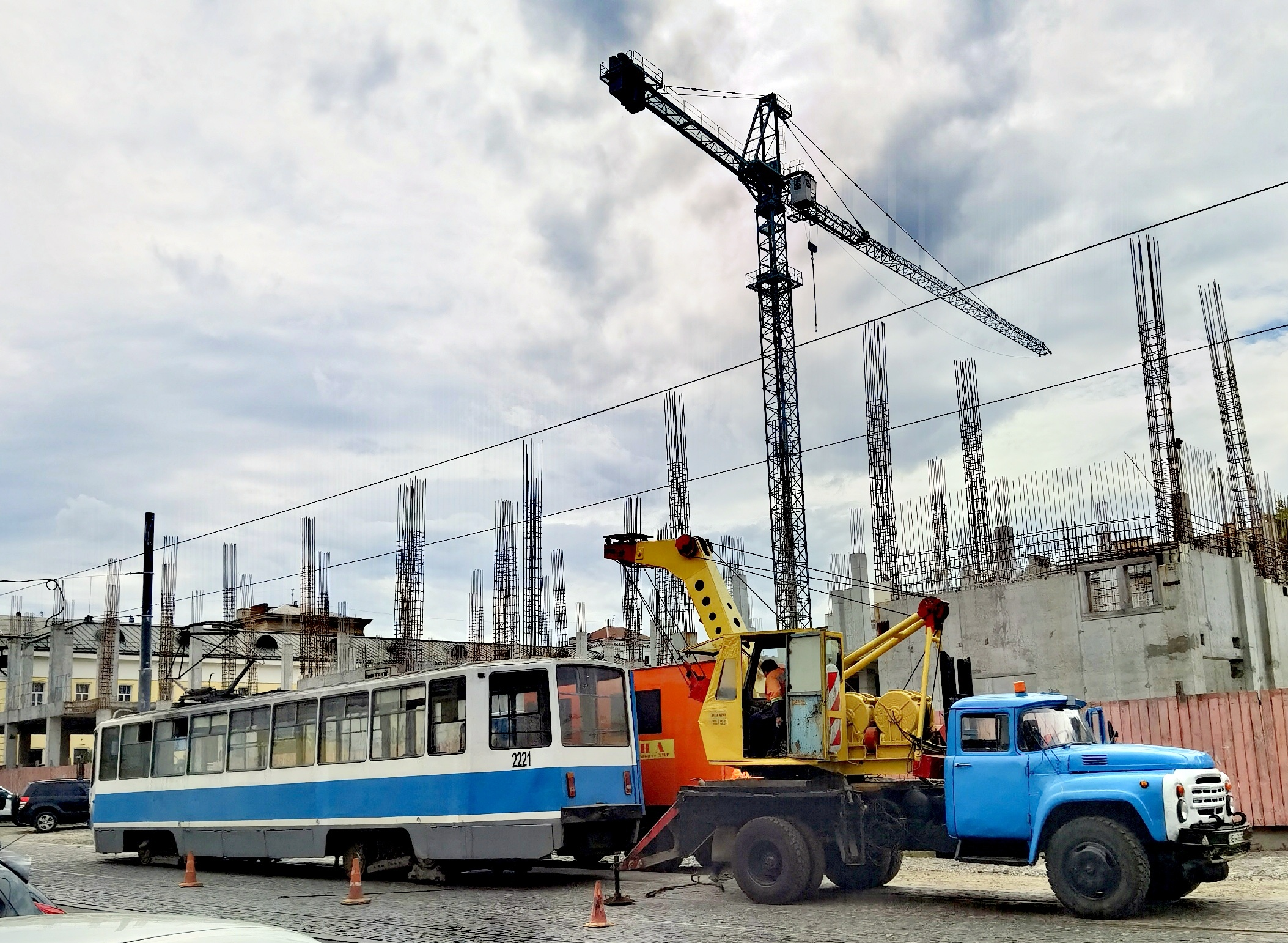
71-608 in Dnipro
