= KTM-5 =

Soviet tram model

KTM-5 71-605
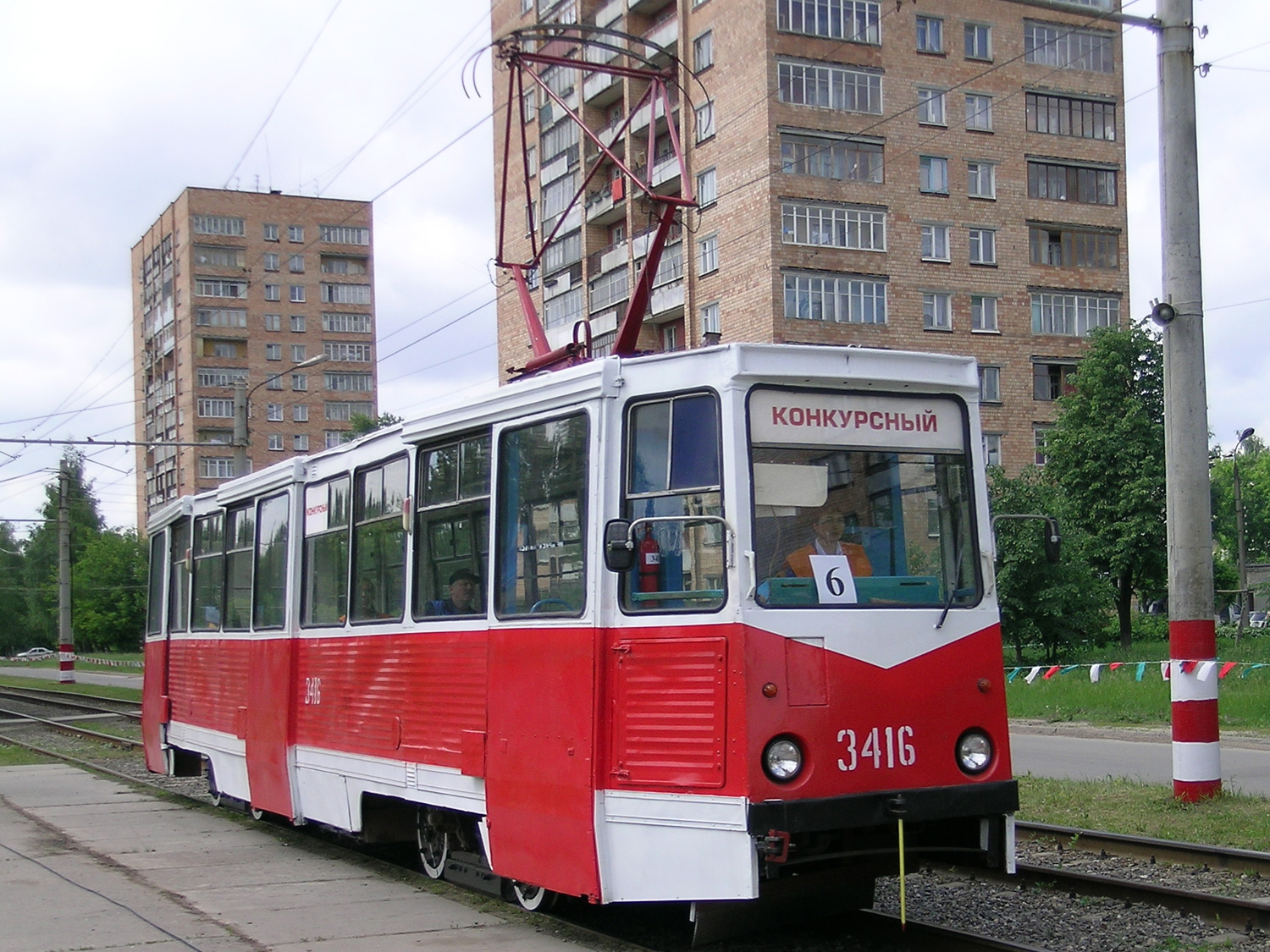
- A KTM-5 tramcar in Nizhny Novgorod, Russia.
- In service: 1963–present
- Manufacturer: UKVZ
- Assembly: Ust-Katav, USSR
- Family name: KTM
- Constructed: 1963, 1965, 1967, 1969–1992
- Number built: 14,991
- Predecessor: KTM-2/KTM-3
- Successor: 71-608 (KTM-8); 71-619 (KTM-19)
- Capacity: See table

Specifications
- Car length: See table
- Width: 2,600 mm (8 ft 6 in)
- Height: See table
- Floor height: 900 mm (35 in)
- Entry: Step
- Doors: 3
- Wheel diameter: 700 mm (28 in)
- Wheelbase: 1,940 mm (6 ft 4 in) (Axles); 7,500 mm (24 ft 7 in) (Bogies)
- Maximum speed: See table
- Weight: See table
- Engine type: See table
- Traction motors: 4
- Power output: See table
- Acceleration: See table
- Deceleration: See table
- Electric system: 550 V DC
- Current collection: Bow collector, pantograph, trolley pole
- Wheels driven: 4
- Bogies: 2
- Minimum turning radius: 16 m (52 ft)
- Track gauge: 1,524 mm (5 ft); 1,435 mm (4 ft 8 1/2 in)

The KTM-5, later known as the 71-605, is a Soviet tram model manufactured by UKVZ. First introduced in 1963, the KTM-5 was mass-produced between 1969 and 1992, with a total of 14,991 tramcars being made. KTM-5 trams were built exclusively for the Soviet Union, and therefore are currently only operating in post-Soviet states.

== Name ==
Prior to 1976, KTM was used by UKVZ as a trademark for tram models, being an abbreviation of Kirov Motor Tram (Russian: Кировский Трамвай Моторный). The -5 extension referred to it being a fifth generation tram model. Ural was a commonly used name for trams starting in 1965 until 1971, and "УРАЛ" (English: Ural) was embossed on trams from this time period.

In July 1976, a naming standard was introduced in the Soviet Union for tram and metro rolling stock. The KTM-5 became officially designated as the 71-605; where 71- designated tramcar, 6 designated the UKVZ Ust-Katav production plant, and 05 designated the tramcar generation. Suffixes were added to either name to distinguish variations.

== History and design ==
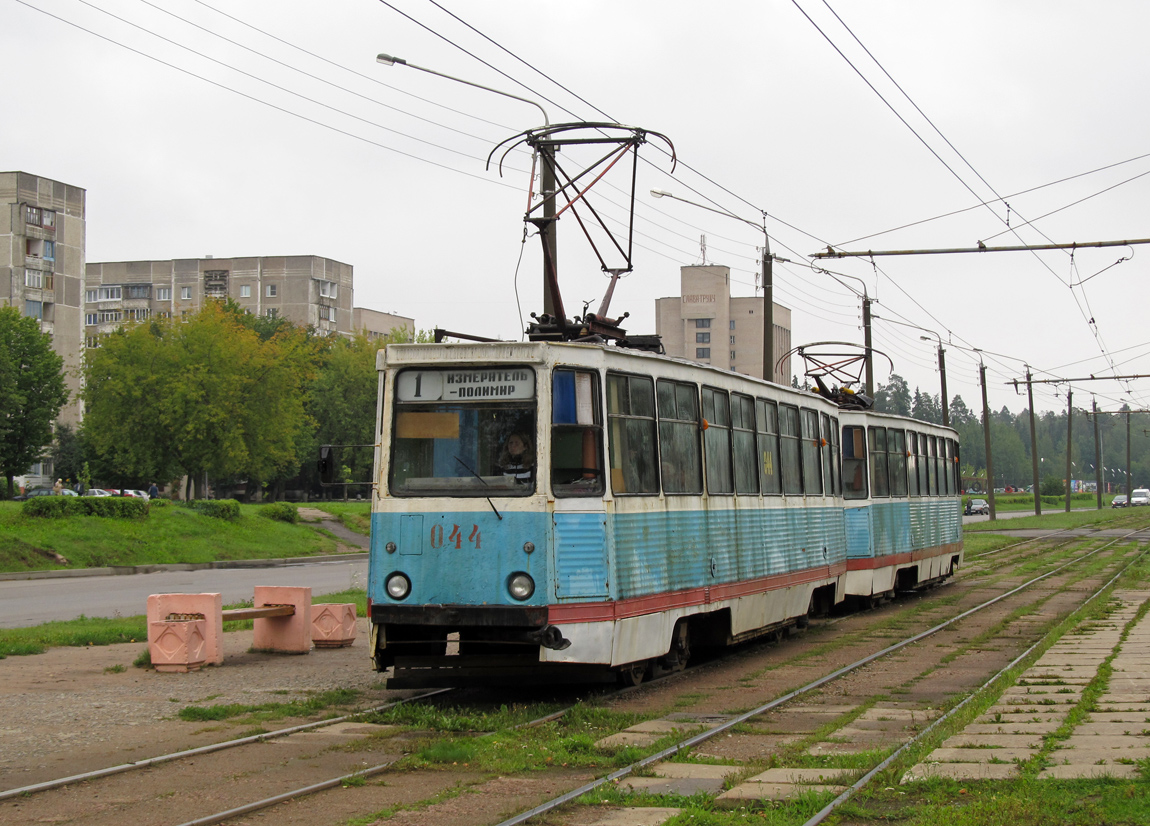
It was necessary for KTM-5 trams to be able to operate as electric multiple units, as seen in Navapolack in 2012

By the mid-1950s, tram fleets in Soviet cities were technically outdated, with most of the vehicles in service produced before World War II. The majority of domestically produced trams were small, two-axle vehicles, whose design severely limited passenger capacity on growing systems. In European Russia, large cities operated spacious, four-axle double bogie trams; Moscow was able to import the Czechoslovak Tatra T2, and domestic MTV-82 trams produced by RVR in the Latvian SSR. Leningrad was supplied by the local tram builder, Leningrad Wagon Repair Plant. Initially, it was expected that RVR would be able to mass produce the MTV-82, but production could not scaled to supply the Soviet Union. Additionally, MTV-82 trams were outdated in their design and could not operate with a trailer or with one another as an electric multiple unit. In December 1959, the Council of Ministers of the Russian Soviet Federative Socialist Republic appointed Ust-Katav Wagon-Building Plant (UKVZ) to lead the development and eventual mass production for a four-axle, double bogie tram capable of operating as a multiple unit.

=== Prototypes ===
The original KTM-5 was built in 1963 and consisted of two prototype tramcars. The electrical, mechanical, and aesthetic designs were derived from the Soviet RVZ-6, based on the Czechoslovak Tatra T2, which in turn was a licensed adaptation of the North American PCC tram. The design used a rheostat control system. Compared to later variations of the KTM-5, the aesthetic design of the original prototypes featured a streamlined all-steel body, which was also influenced by the recently introduced Tatra T3 and LM-57 trams. In 1964 the prototype trams were delivered to Chelyabinsk for testing and were returned to UKVZ for revisions in 1965.

=== Early production models ===
Production of the KTM-5M (M for Modified), also given the name "Ural", began in 1965 in limited quantities. The tram would have to wait until 1969 to enter mass production, as modification to the UKVZ plant had not been completed to allow mass production of bogies. In the meantime, UKVZ was still revising and testing the design before entering mass production.

The aesthetic appearance of the tram was completely redesigned from the prototype KTM-5, which was considered to be outdated. Led by the Institute of Technical Aesthetics in Sverdlovsk, the new tram design featured sharp edges, large windows, and the metal body was replaced with fiberglass paneling. The choice to use fiberglass reduced the weight of the tram by 2 metric tons (4,400 lb), which, along with lighter and more powerful traction motors, improved the tram's capacity, acceleration, and speed. Two KTM-5M trams were constructed in December 1965 and destined for testing in Moscow. The trams, which remained unnumbered but known by their serial numbers #1 and #2, varied slightly from each other, mostly in window and ventilation design. Tram #1 had framed windows with a sliding sash for passive airflow, while tram #2 had sealed frameless windows and forced air. Production models would use the sliding frame windows as well as forced air. Upon arrival in Moscow in March 1966, tram #1 was displayed at the Exhibition of Achievements of National Economy before joining tram #2 in passenger testing in July. In 1968 one of the trams was displayed along with the LM-68 at "Interbytmash-68" (Russian: Интербытмаш-68) at the Sokolniki Exhibition and Convention Centre. Three prototype trams were constructed and delivered to Omsk in December 1967 for testing in the harsh Siberian climate. Moscow trams #2 joined in July 1968 and #1 in 1969.

The KTM-5M proved to be successful in testing, and in 1968 they were recommenced for mass production. In December 1968 the modification of the UKVZ plant was completed and the first batch of production model trams were delivered to Omsk in 1969. Coincidentally, UKVZ ended production of two-axle trams.

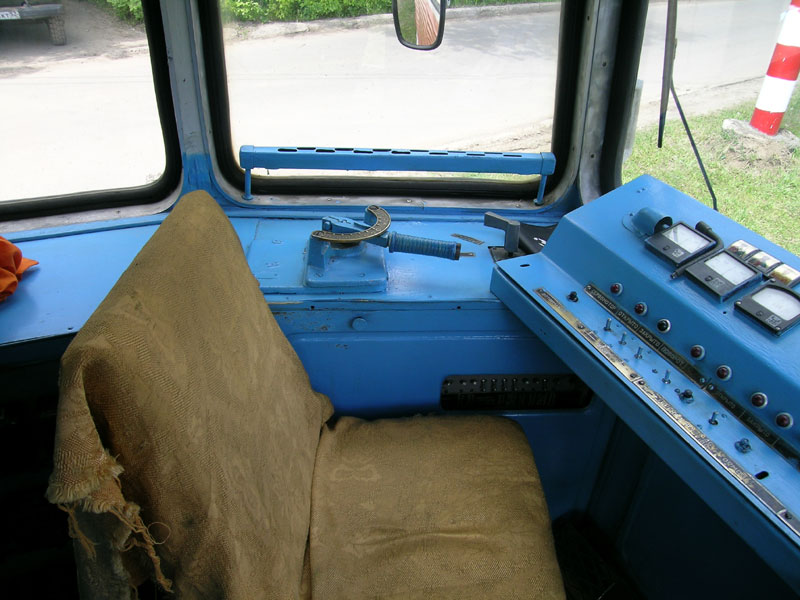
A rheostat controller reduced the weight and maintenance of the KTM-5.

In 1970, one tram was fitted with an experimental thyristor-pulse control system and was identified as a KTM-5MT. The tram was tested in Moscow, but was unable to operate with passengers. The tram was returned to the UKVZ plant and refitted as a KTM-5M with the standard rheostat control system.

=== Recall and revisions ===
In the first two years of deployment, the "Ural" trams experienced significant issues and safety problems, mostly electrical and brake failures and a number of fires. The iconic fiberglass design was susceptible to burning, and a tram could completely burn-out within minutes and emit toxic smoke. One particular incident occurred in 1971 in Tomsk, in which an undisclosed number of victims died in a tram fire, a majority suffered from chemical poisoning after inhaling the toxic smoke. After the incident, the Ministry of Public Utilities and the Ministry of General Machine Building demanded changes be made to the design, and all trams were recalled to be modified.

The modernized design, designated the KTM-5M3 (M3 for third modification), replaced the fiberglass body with fluted metal. The roof remained plastic, as it was necessary for electrical components and pantograph to be mounted on a nonconductive surface. The front and rear of the tram remained plastic too. Among the approximately 620 to 900 "Ural" trams produced, 60% were recalled to UKVZ, while the remaining 40% were modified by their tram depots. Other minor changes were made; cables driving the doors were replaced with chains, new wheel arches exposed the bogies, and fluorescent lights were replaced with incandescent.

In the early half of the 1970s, tram operators complained about poor build quality and reliability of early KTM-5M3 vehicles. The KTM-5M3's modernization only addressed the vehicle's caustic fiberglass exterior, but was still frequently experiencing brake failures, door drive malfunctions, and electrical fires. In response, UKVZ complained about operators' low qualifications. In the latter half of the decade, UKVZ improved build quality and operators and mechanics learned the complicated idiosyncrasies of the tram.

Throughout its production span, UKVZ made few improvements to the design. Since 1976 a new pantograph, developed for the KTM-6, became standard on production models. Since 1981 the dedicated parking brake was removed from the design, instead the function was performed by the tram's drum brakes. In 1986 the arrangement of the tram's turn signals and brake lights was modified.

=== Final production years ===
By the late 1980s it was apparent that the tram had become outdated; the design had gone largely unchanged since it was first developed. On a national level, the Ministry of General Machine Building began to show concern with the outdated tram. In order to appease the Ministry, as well as raise prices on the tram, UKVZ made minimal improvements to the design, designating it as the 71-605A (A for first modification). With it were new traction motors, significantly quieter than before, a new coupling system, and fluorescent lighting. In June 1989 the first improved trams were delivered to Prokopyevsk. In 1988 UKVZ began prototyping a successor, the 71-608, but mass production would not begin until 1991.

May 1990 saw the introduction of a unique variation, the 71-605U (Russian: 71-605У), built exclusively for the standard gauge system in Rostov-on-Don. Because the system could accommodate wider vehicles, the only modification needed was standard gauge bogies on the traditional 71-605A tram. Build quality declined during the dissolution of the Soviet Union. After the introduction of the 71-608, production of the 71-605A and 71-605U ceased in late 1992, ending 23 years of continuous mass production of the KTM-5.

=== Local upgrades and body replacements ===
In 1991, a railbus was built using the body of the tram at the Tbilisi Electric Locomotive Plant. This car ran on lines that had recently been deenergized near the Gldani depot. It was operated privately.

For some cities, a cheaper solution than to buy a new tram was to undergo a body replacement, where the only original parts are usually the bogies. These upgrades cost less than a completely new tram, at 100,000 rubles for the upgrade compared to 28 million rubles for a new car. The upgrades features a completely new body with touchscreens for the driver, climate control, lighting, new traction converters and new flooring. These particular vehicles are rebuilt by Gorizont LLC, named 71-605RM13 and sees use in Magnitogorsk, Zlatoust and Saratov.

Other modifications with different layouts were created in Krasnodar '71-605TH', '71-605EP' in Omsk, a number of modernized cars in Chelyabinsk and one example in Mykolaiv.
