= Trams in Mykolaiv =

Electric tram system in Mykolaiv, Ukraine

Mykolaiv Tram
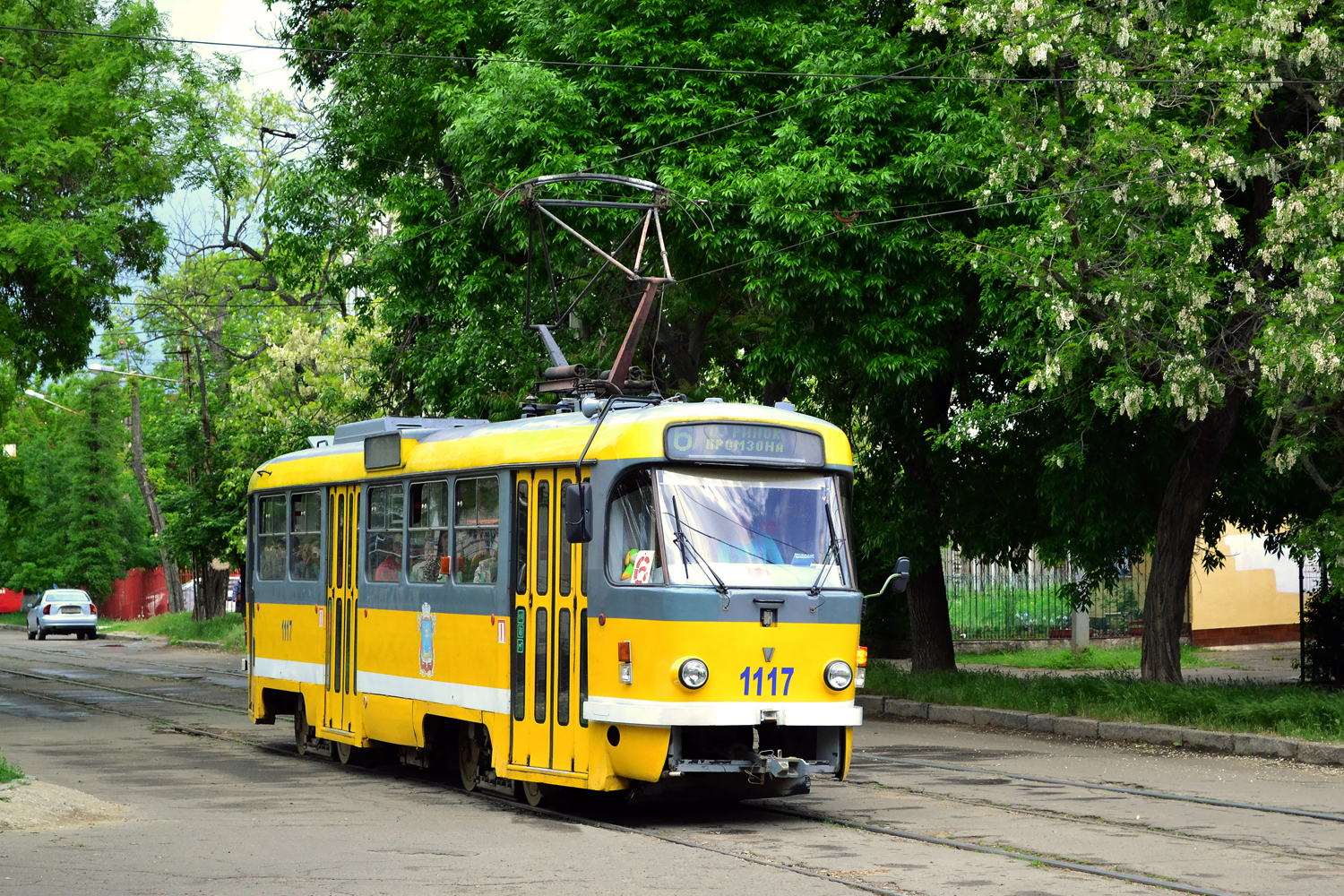
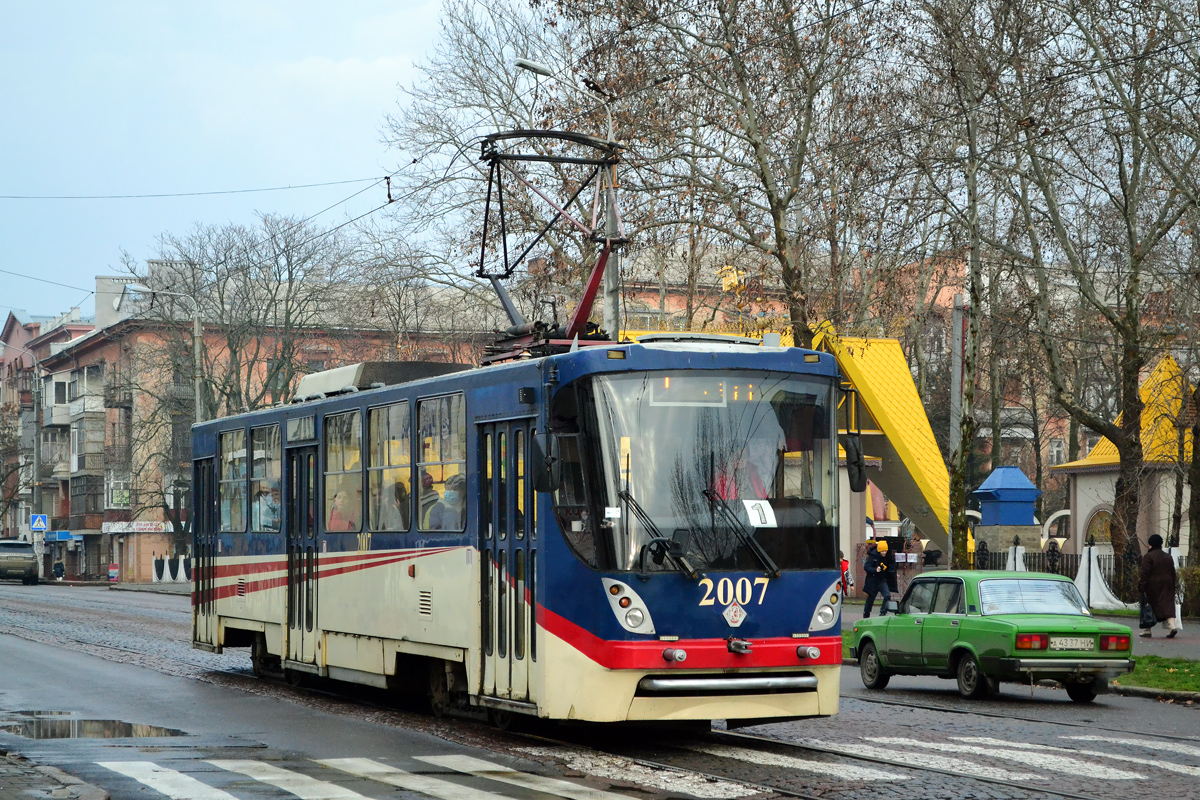
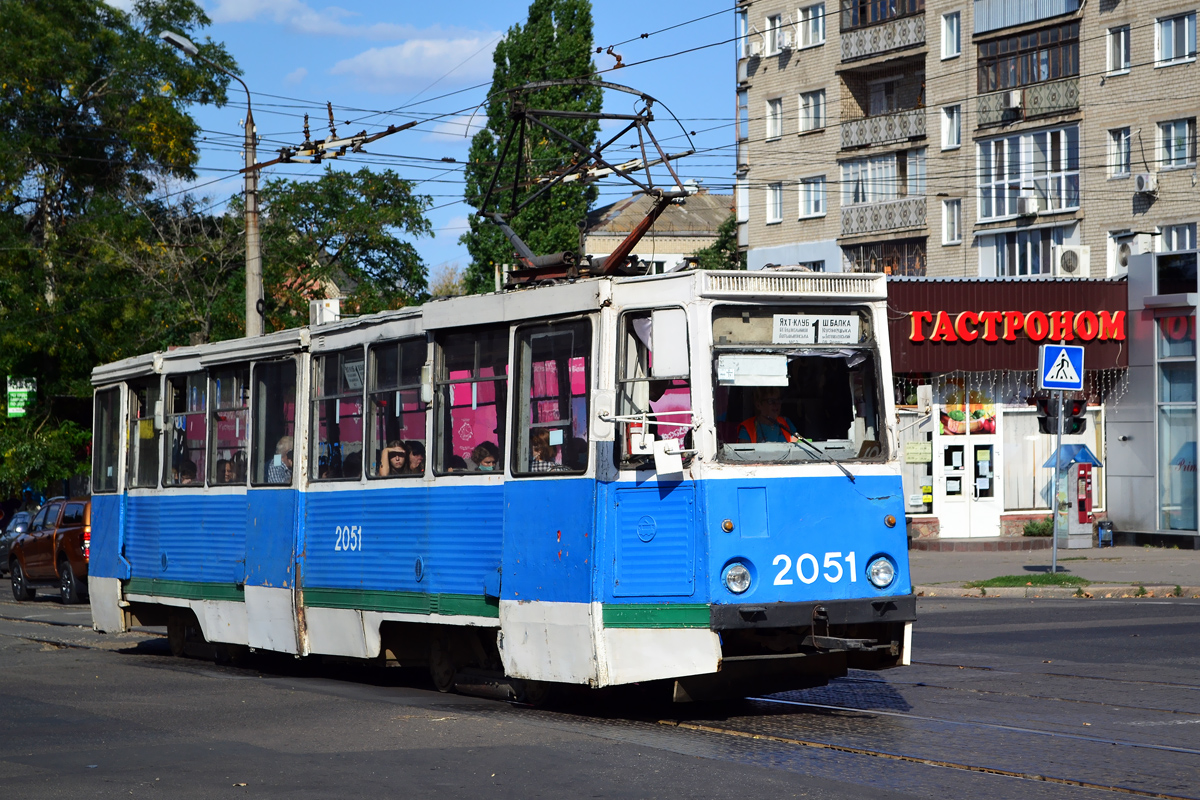
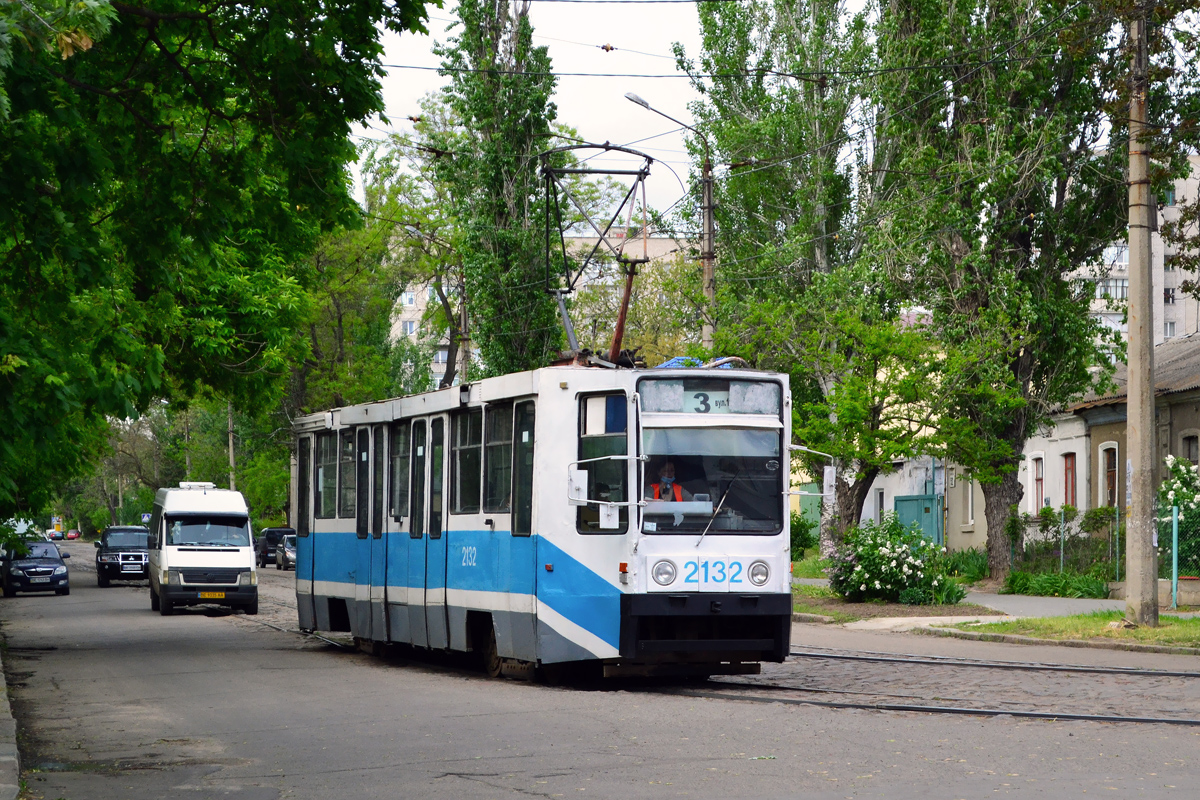
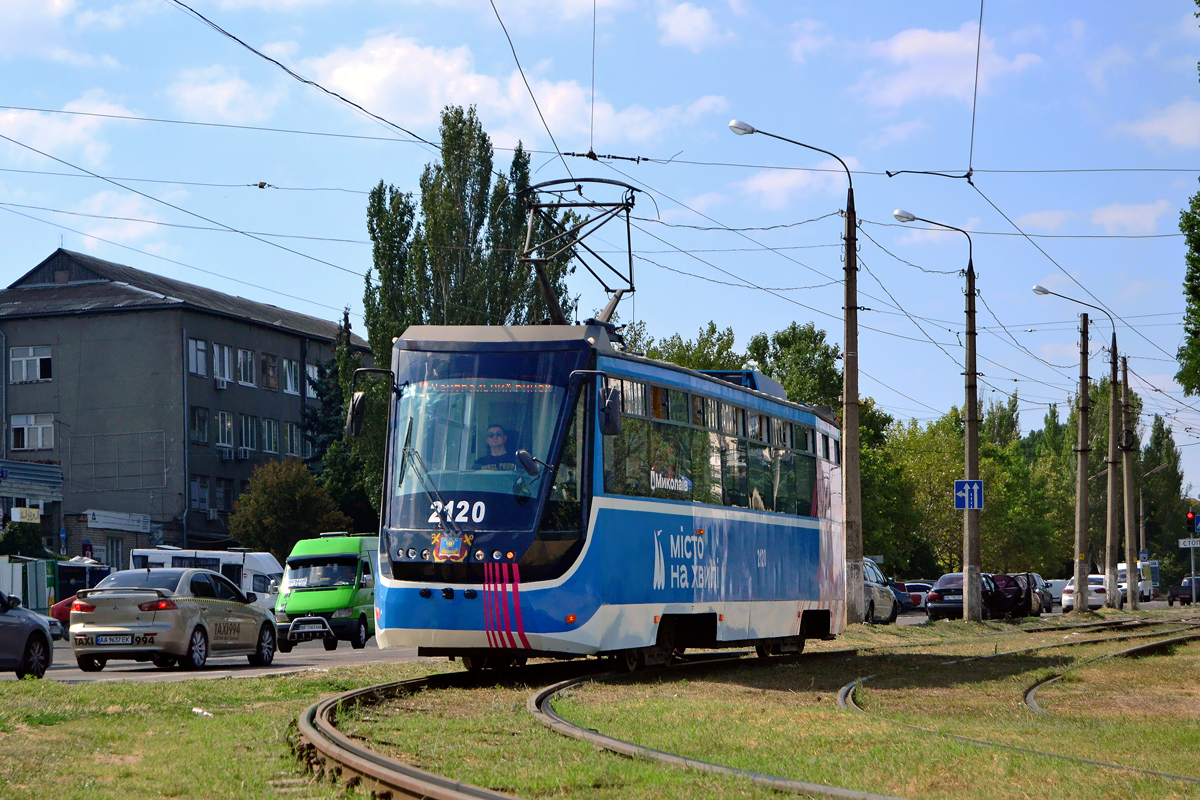

Overview
- Native name: Миколаївський трамвай
- Owner: State Enterprise "Mykolaivelectrotrans"
- Locale: Mykolaiv
- Transit type: Tram
- Number of lines: 6
- Line number: 1, 3, 6, 7, 10, 11
- Number of stations: 88
- Annual ridership: ▲24,346,600 (2018)
- Headquarters: 54020, Mykolaiv, 17 Andreeva Street
- Website: https://mkelektrotrans.mk.ua/

Operation
- Began operation: 25 July 1897 - Horse-drawn trams 3 Jan 1915 - Electric trams
- Operator: Mykolaivelectrotrans
- Character: At-grade street running
- Number of vehicles: 167

Technical
- System length: 72.83 km
- Track gauge: 1,524 mm (5 ft)
- Electrification: 600 V Overhead lines
- Top speed: 75 km/h
Route map in 2021
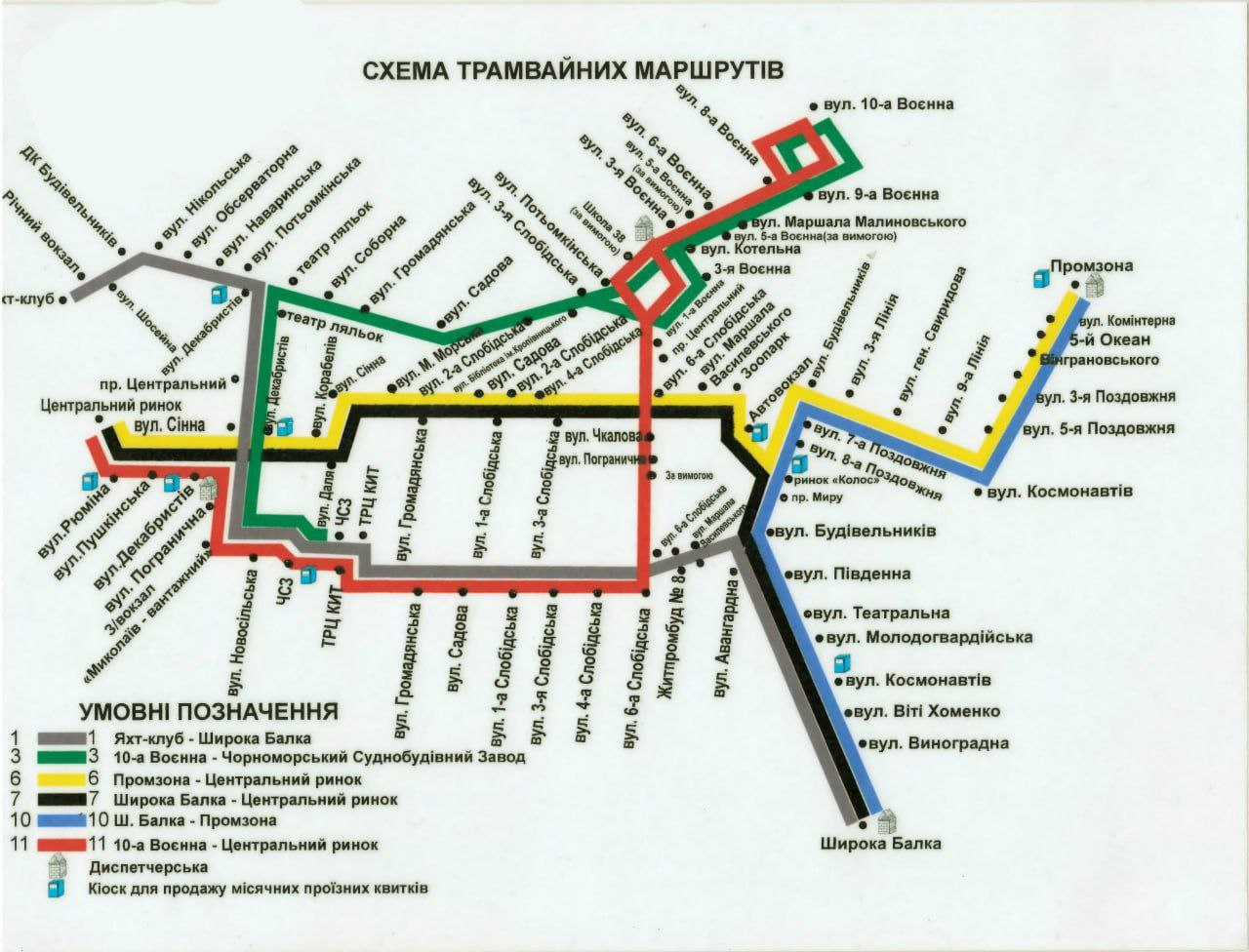

The Mykolaiv tram network is part of the public transportation system that serves Mykolaiv, southern Ukraine.

== History ==
=== Horse-drawn carriages: 1897-1915 ===
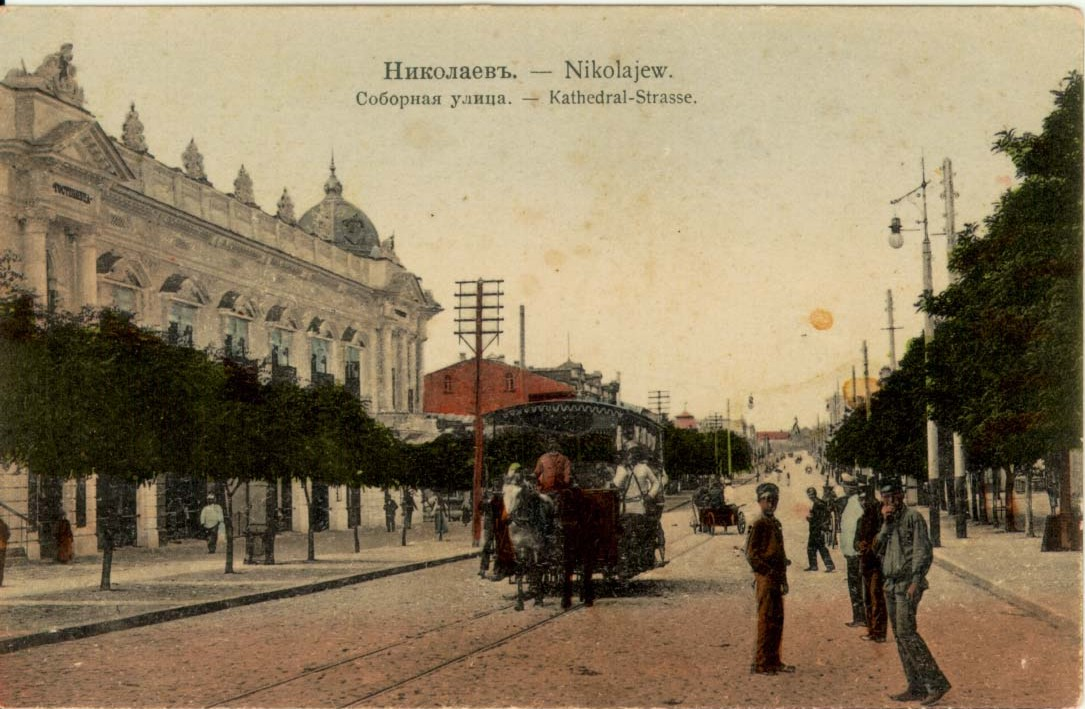
Horse-drawn carriage on Soborna Street, Mykolaiv

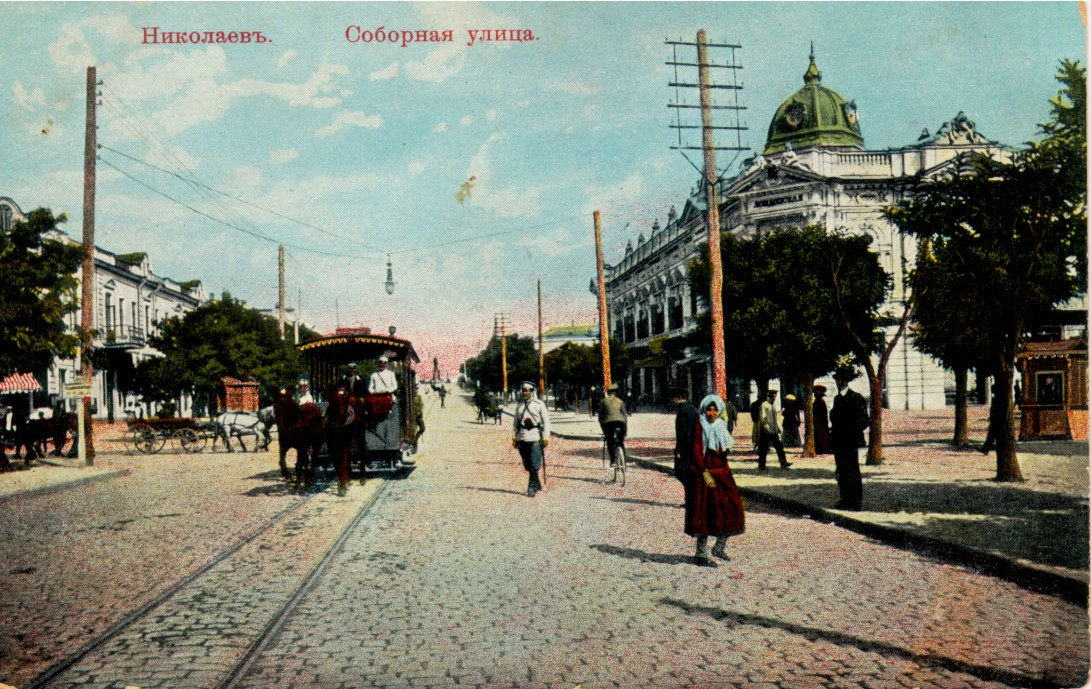
Horse-drawn carriage on Cathedral Street near the London Hotel

In 1880s, the question of building a horse-drawn city railway in Mykolaiv became the subject of heated discussions at meetings of the city council. The rapid growth of Mykolaiv — “the third port in the country for the export of grain” — necessitated the development of new connections. In January 1892, the city architect of Mykolaiv E. A. Shtukenberg compiled a “Projected estimate of costs for the construction and operation of a horse-drawn railway in Mykolaiv” with a length of 10.7 versts (11.4 km).

In November 1895, a document was sent from the office of the Mykolaiv military governor to the technical and construction committee of the Ministry of Internal Affairs (St. Petersburg) with the following content: “…the device and operation of horse-drawn railways in Mykolaiv are presented to M. N. Romanovich and retired captain V. V. Likharev under the Contract concluded by the city on February 1 of this year with the permission of the Ministry of Internal Affairs dated December 9, 1894 under No. 10435…”. All 34 paragraphs of this Contract soon became the main document in the activities of the Belgian Joint-Stock Company of Horse-drawn Railways in Mykolaiv, formed on March 9, 1896 in Liege (Belgium). Since then, the Belgian shareholders have been the organizers and owners of the horse-drawn railway in the city. The first authorized representative of the company in Mykolaiv was Mr. Goossens Adalter (Adolf) Henrikhovich, and his agency was temporarily located in the Barbe Hotel at 3 Soborna Street.

In the spring of 1897, construction of the first line of the horse-drawn railway "Bazarnaya Ploshcha - Viyskovy Rynok" began. In this regard, Odessa Street (part of Potemkinskaya Street from Sadovaya to the modern park "Narodny Sad") was improved, the pavement was expanded and paved at the expense of 1/2 kopeck toll. The track was narrow, 3.3 feet (1.05 m) wide. The horse-drawn railway was single-track with special crossings for passing oncoming horses. The carriages were of a lightweight type with a roof supported on cast-iron columns. The seats in the carriages were transverse, designed for 26 passengers: 20 in the carriage and 6 people on the rear platform. Before the opening of the first line, 10 such carriages were purchased . They were manufactured by the Odesa companies "Demert" and "Galvich". The work of the horses was strictly regulated by several resolutions of the city council. For example, the decree of July 7, 1898 stipulated the following rules: the speed of movement should be 7-12 versts (7.47-12.8 km) per hour and only at a trot; sidings should be located at a distance of 235 sazhens (about 501 m) from each other (some of these stops have been preserved as tram stops to this day) .

There were summer and winter carriages (winter carriages did not have an upper deck - imperial). Summer carriages of early design were open, had five rows of three seats each and were harnessed by a pair of horses. Summer carriages of later design were also open and had twenty seats on benches and six standing places on the rear platform. For protection from rain and wind there were leather curtains that could be lowered from the roof.

On July 26 (August 7 N.S.), 1897, the horse-drawn carriages began to run. The first route was short: from the Alexander II Chapel, which was located at the intersection of Soborna and Khersonska Streets, to the Military Market on Slobidka. The chapel was the starting point for all horse-drawn carriage lines. In December 1897, a second line was laid, connecting the city center with the Mykolaiv-Vantazhny railway station. In early February 1898, this line merged with the first line into one "Military Market - Railway Station". Its length was 5 versts 50 sazhens (about 6.5 km). The line had 10 stops. In 1899, it was extended 640 m to the city hospital.

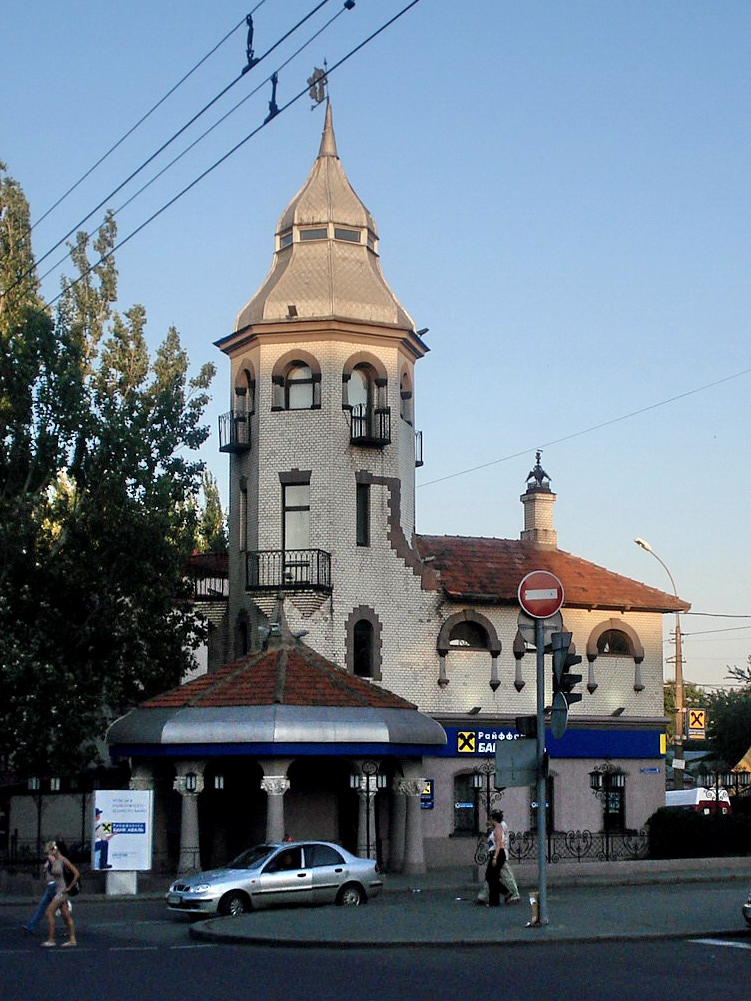
The former first tram substation building

On June 23, 1898, the 3rd line of the horse-drawn railway to the Spasskoe Urochyshche (now the yacht club), which ran along many streets of the city, officially opened. The "Bazar - Spassk" line had 8 stops, as well as its own peculiarities due to the fact that there was a steep descent and ascent leading to the yacht club. The line connected the city with the country residence of Prince Grigory Potemkin at Spassk. This route operated only in the summer, and from October 15 to March 15, the service was suspended. In the summer, at the final stop "Spassk", an additional third horse was harnessed to the horse-drawn tram to overcome the steep climb.

On August 17, 1898, the 4th line "Bazaar - Commercial Port" was commissioned, which ran from the chapel past the bazaar to 3rd Pishchanaya Street (Obraztsova Street), into lane "A" to the Naval plant, along the coastal pier into the port to the elevator. The lines "Bazaar - Spassky Descent" and "Bazaar - Commercial Port" were combined into one with a total length of 6 versts 480 sazhens (about 8 km). By 1900, all 4 horse-drawn lines in Mykolaiv formed a single operational system with a length of 14.5 km, but the common starting point was the chapel at the bazaar .

The fare system was distance-based and ranged from 3 to 8 kopecks. The gross income, according to the reports of the anonymous society of horse-drawn railways in Mykolaiv, for 1900 amounted to 123,144 rubles 25 kopecks. In 1902, 2,324,845 passengers were transported. The horse-drawn carriage service personnel were required to wear impeccably clean and durable uniforms and caps .

=== Transition to electric traction ===
At the beginning of the 20th century, an important event took place in Mykolaiv - the commissioning of the city's electric power station. It became possible to replace horse-drawn traction with electric traction . In 1902-1903, the city council began communicating with the Belgian society about converting the horse-drawn tram to electric traction . In 1909, the design of the first city electric tram began . The tram with a trailer car was designed and then manufactured in the St. Petersburg office of the Belgian company Siemens & Halske. The route equipment cost the city authorities two million rubles. An electric-powered tram line with a track width of 1000 mm in Mykolaiv was built in 1913-1914 using an economic method, when all work on laying rails, installing poles and hanging wires was carried out by the city 's own workers without involving third-party organizations. Before the construction of the first line was implemented, the city council considered several projects to start operating electric trams. The earliest one dates back to 1901.

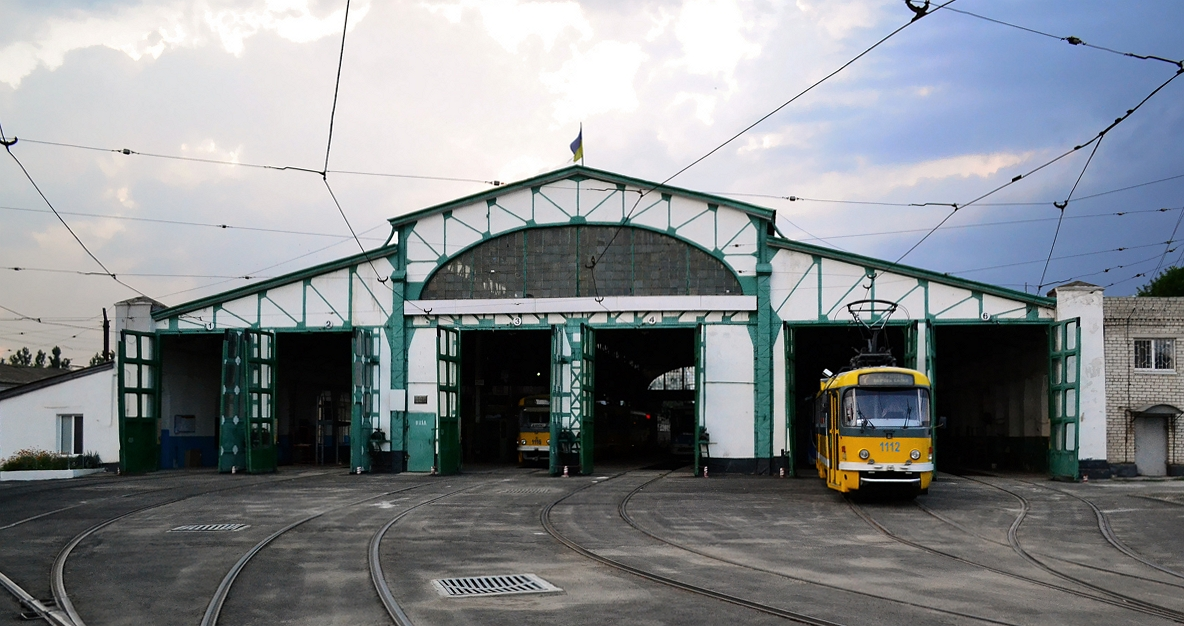
Tram depot No. 1

=== Electric trams: 1915 - Now ===
Initially, electric trams was supposed to start running on December 6, 1914 (O.S.), but the work had not been completed by that time. And only on Sunday, December 21, 1914 (January 3, 1915 N.S.) the first electric tram was launched in Mykolaiv, and after some time the construction of the tram depot was completed, which later became depot No. 1 . At the beginning of the 20th century, Soborna Street was a thoroughfare and trams ran along it.

In 1914, a transformer substation for trams was built on Bazarnaya Square. If we take into account the technical purpose of the building, its appearance is impressive: a round porch, a colonnade, decoration of windows and doors, balconies, a corner tower, facade decoration, a red-tiled roof and other details. Somewhat later, energy consumption increased, so another room was built behind the castle-substation, larger in area (now the building has been preserved, although it has changed its purpose several times). By the end of 1915, 4 tram routes were already operating in the city, and the total length of tram tracks was 17 versts 125 fathoms (18.4 km). From 31 to 38 trams operated in the system.

In 1917, the city's main roads were once again in disarray, as Mykolaiv was left without electricity during the revolutionary events in the Russian Empire. The Russian Civil War, which began after the revolution, forced people to abandone trams for a long time. Only in 1925 was tram traffic in the city restored. The routes "Kuznetskaya - Privoz" and "Privoz - Spask" were combined into one and the numbering of the routes was changed. In 1927, only two routes operated in Mykolaiv: "Kuznetskaya - Spask" and "Kabotazhka - Hospital".

In 1933, the Mykolaiv tram fleet began to be replenished with cars of the X and M types. By the end of the 1930s, the city was being organized, its engineering infrastructure was becoming more complicated. By the end of the 1930s, the length of tram tracks was 41 km. The city was served by 71 units of rolling stock . In 1939, the tram began to run to Vodopiya.

The Mykolaiv tram continued to operate even during the occupation by the Nazi troops during the German-Soviet War. On October 9, 1942, tram traffic was restored. The cars ran on the line from 04:30 to 08:00 and from 17:00 to 20:00 on five routes. In the first days of operation, the city was served by 12 cars. On September 3, 1944, the tram began to run from Petrovsky Park (now "Narodny Sad") to Khersonskaya Street (now Central Avenue). At the end of 1944, the line from the Yacht Club to the Black Sea Shipyard was restored.

After the war, the development of the electric tram network in Mykolaiv continued. On April 25, 1951, a new depot began operating, which received the number 2. Only KTM/KTP-1 trams were housed in it, which had a wider gauge - 1524 mm. The very first tramcar, dark red below and cream above, had the side number 201. The following cars were painted dark blue. A distinctive feature of the trams of this model was a small star located in front, which housed the headlight. Trams, which had the number 206 inclusive, had rectangular windows, and doors with oval-shaped windows (as on KTM-2 cars). Thus, there were two tram depots in the city with two different types of tramcars (for track gauge 1000 mm and 1524 mm respectively), which were not interconnected. The length of tram tracks in the city at that time was 33.2 km. The trams belonging to depot No. 1 were assigned numbers 401-459, and depot No. 2 had numbers starting with No. 460.

On June 23, 1952, a broad-gauge tram service was launched. The new tram route No. 6 ran from 06:00 to 01:00, and connected the 6th Slobidskaya district with the village of Novy Vodopiy. The new route was separated from the main tram network, but was interconnected to other narrow-gauge routes. Passengers traveled from Novy Vodopiy and transferred at the intersection of 6th Slobidskaya and Chkalova streets to the old narrow-gauge tram routes No. 4 and 5.

During 1955-1958, carriages from East Germany (T-57 and B-57) began to arrive. Compared to the Soviet ones, they were more comfortable, had an insulated driver's cabin, soft seats in the cabin and automatic doors. In the late 1950s, the construction of new narrow-gauge tram lines was stopped - the priority was to develop broad-gauge trams. The city electric transport management began to develop routes for carriages of the broad-gauge tram fleet. MTV-82 carriages (called "Pullman") began to run on these lines, which were first operated for a long time in other cities and then underwent repairs in Kyiv at the Dzerzhinsky plant. Their feature was the presence of three rear windows. Some of these cars worked in tandem with a non-motorized trailer. Due to frequent cardan shaft malfunctions (the drive of the wheel pairs was not carried out directly from the electric motor to the wheels, but through cardan shafts), these trams spent a significant part of the time idle under repair. There were about ten of them in the city. They were mostly yellow and blue. One of these trams was nicknamed the "green snake" because of its green color. They were later withdrawn from service and sent out of the city. In 1976, a crane for road repair work was built on the basis of the last MTV-82. It was only written off in 1984 and immediately cut into scrap metal .

The total length of urban tram lines in 1958 was 46 km, and two years later - 64 km.

In December 1959, the tram began running to its current terminus at the Central Collective Farm Market.

In 1960, the first KTM/KTP-2 appeared in the city. From 1961 to 1972, the final transition to broad gauge was carried out in Mykolaiv, over 11 years the gauge of 33.5 km of tracks were converted from 1000 mm to 1524 mm. The pre-war tramcars were scrapped, and 7 German ones were sent to Yevpatoria in 1969 .

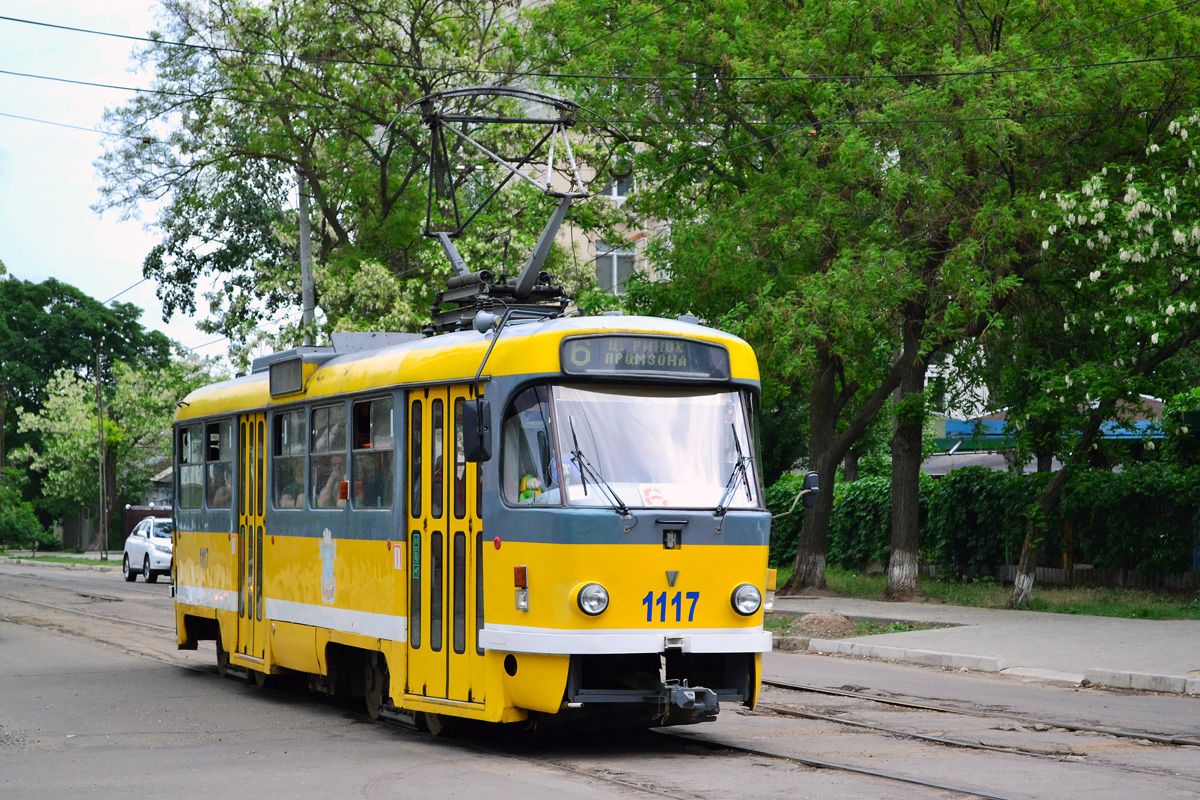
Tatra T3M on Sinna Street

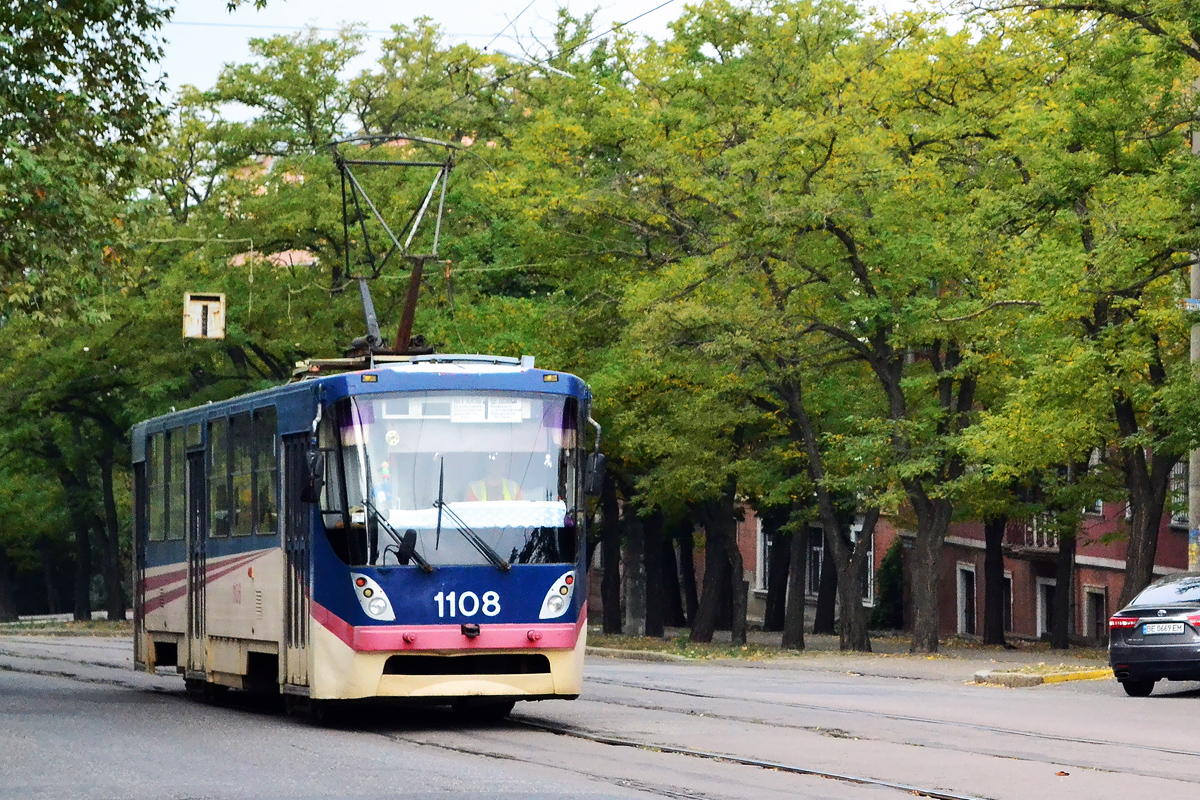
K1 on Nikolskaya Street

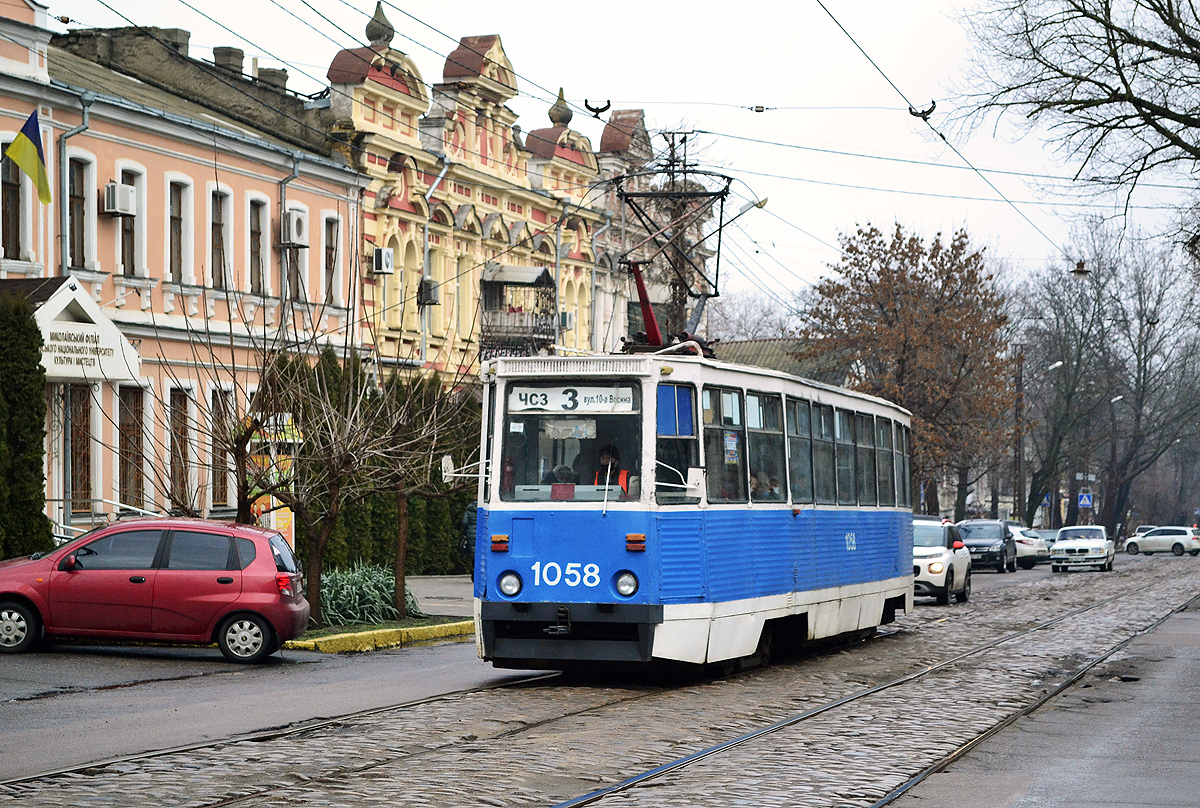
KTM-5M3 on Dekabristov Street

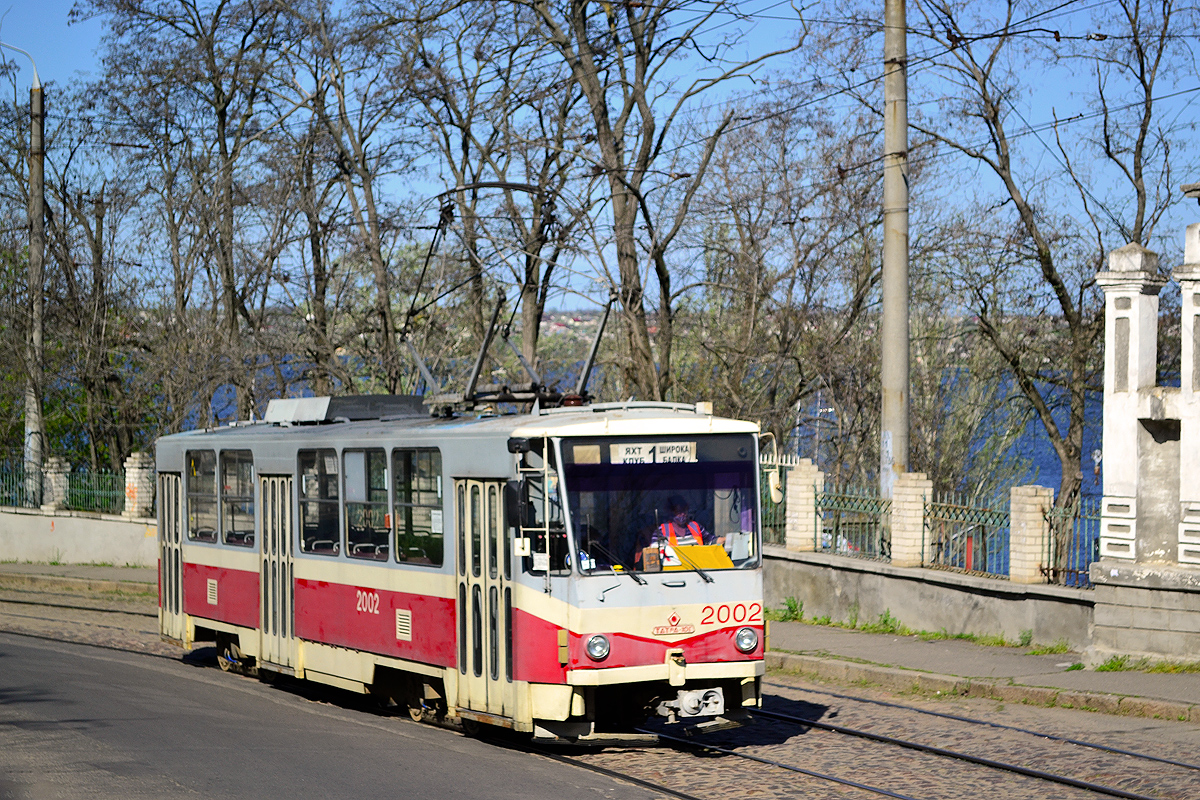
Tatra-Yug on Sportivna Street

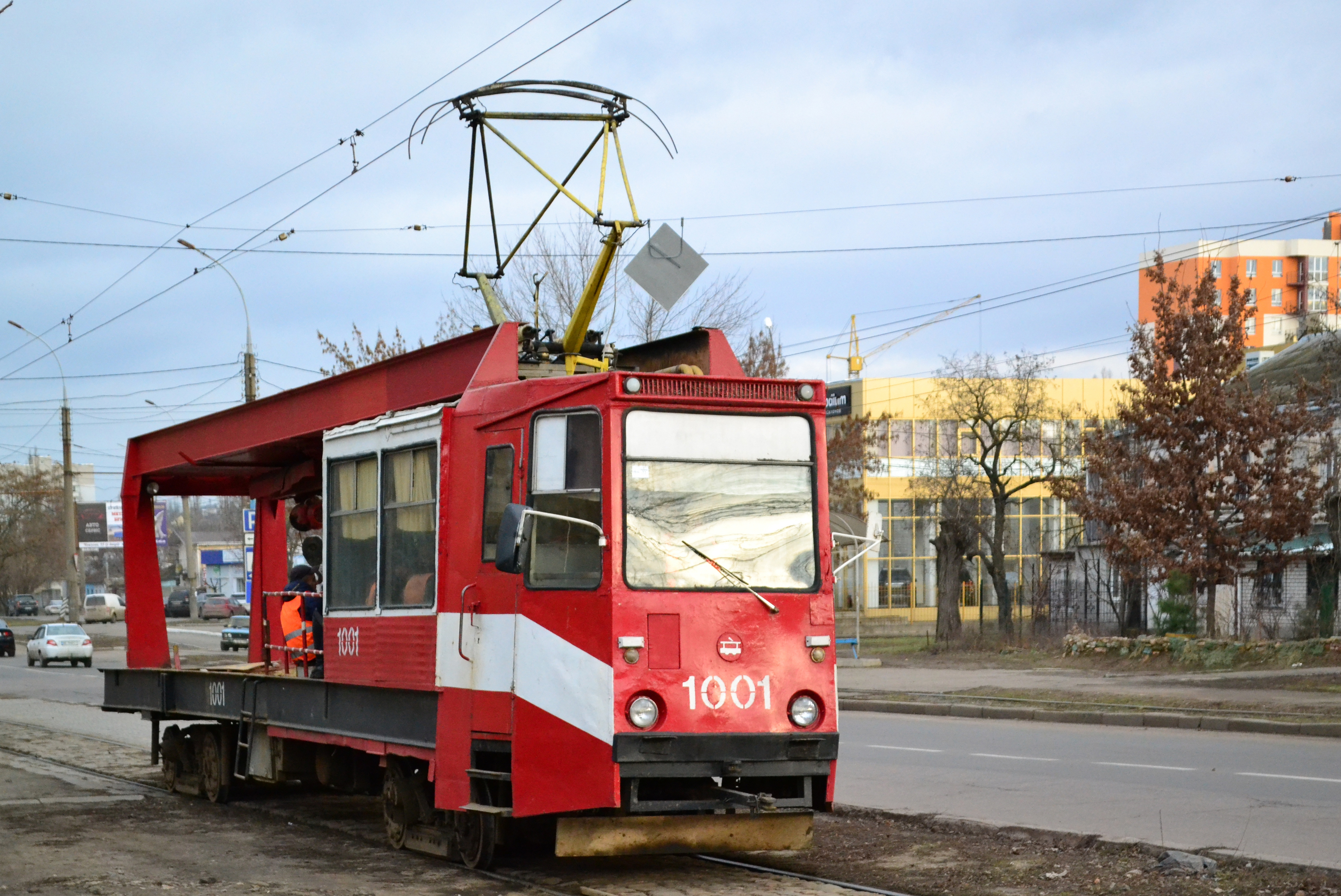
Service wagon of the TK-28 track (No. 1001) on Chkalova Street

As of 1970, the length of tram lines in Mykolaiv was 70 km, with 191 tramcars operating on them. In the early 1970s, the city received the first batch of 12 new-generation tramcars, the KTM-5.

In 1988, the urban electric transport enterprises merged and, accordingly, changed the numbering of the tramcars. The trams' side numbers changed from three-digit to four-digit, where the first digit indicated the depot they belonged to: 1 - depot No. 1, 2 - depot No. 2, 3 - trolleybus depot No. 3.

By 1985, the length of the city's tram lines had already reached 74 km. In those years, trams consisting of two cars operated in the system . In the 1990s, in Mykolaiv, as in many electric transport facilities in Ukraine, passenger traffic on urban transport decreased by an average of 25%. Plans to build a tram line "Industrial Zone - Shyroka Balka" along Kosmonavtiv Street and from 7-th Pozdovzhnaya to Bogoyavlensky Avenue remained unrealized until 2015.

During the economic difficulties from 1992 to 2010, no tram routes or sections of the rail track used for passenger transportation were eliminated in Mykolaiv.

In 1994, a batch of 6 KTM-8 cars arrived.

In 2000-2001, 3 domestically produced Tatra -Yug T6B5 cars were put into operation.

In 2006-2010, 7 K-1 cars arrived the city.

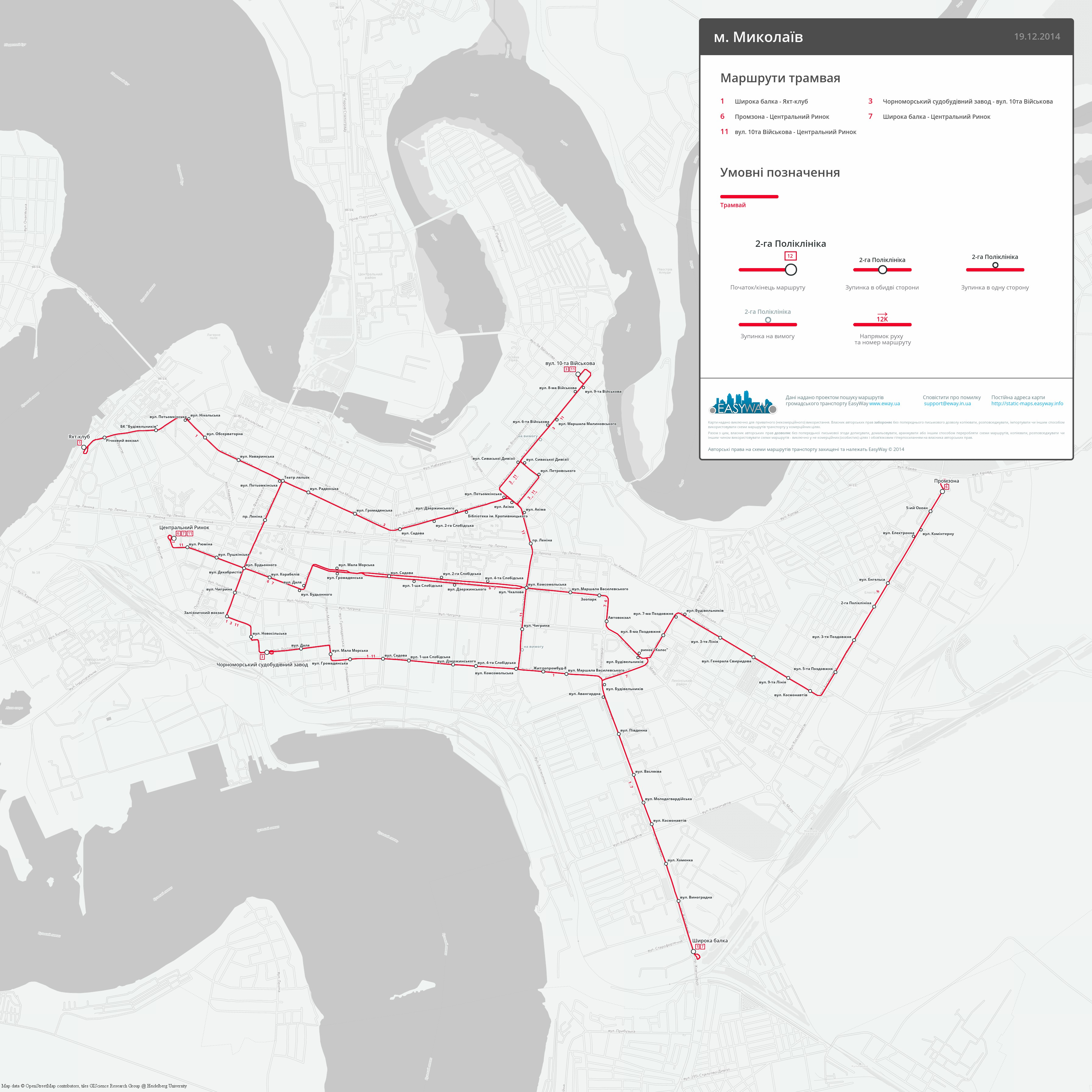
Map of tram network in Mykolaiv, 2015

In February 2011, the management of Mykolaivelectrotrans made a decision to close tram depot No. 2. All trams from it were relocated to depot No. 1.

Tram route No. 10 from Shyroka Balka to Industrial Zone began operating in November 2015. In 2015, 12 used Tatra T3 cars from the Czech Republic and Latvia arrived Mykolaiv.

In 2022, during the Russian invasion of Ukraine, the Mykolaiv tram became one of the symbols of invincibility and the continuation of life in the city. Mykolaiv trams run on six routes, providing not only passenger transportation, but also purified water for the city's residents. In the first days of the start of full-scale Russian aggression against Ukraine, tram traffic in Mykolaiv was temporarily suspended. On February 28, 2022, routes No. 1, 3 and 6 resumed operation, and travel became free for all categories of passengers. On March 17, 2022, the line had 20 cars on routes No. 1, 3 and 6. The interval of movement was 15–20 minutes. On March 23, route No. 11 resumed operation, and from April 22, 2022, routes No. 7 and 10 resumed operation.

Since October 20, 2022, after massive attacks by Russian occupiers on the energy infrastructure of Ukraine, the intervals of movement on all electric transport routes in Mykolaiv have been increased. Also in 2023, trams of the Mykolaivelectrotrans enterprise were used to deliver drinking water to residents.

== Routes ==
There are 6 routes operating in the city of Mykolaiv:

Current tram routes
№	Starting point	End point	Length, км	Frequency, min		
№	Starting point	End point	Length, км	06:00—09:00	09:00—16:00	16:00—20:00
1	Yacht Club	Shyroka Balka	11,8	10—15	10—17	10—21
3	10th Military Street	Black Sea Shipyard	6,8	10—15	15	15—23
6	Central Market	Industrial Zone	11,1	9—15	11—17	9—20
7	Central Market	Shyroka Balka	9,8	30—31	46	30—31
10	Industrial Zone	Shyroka Balka	8.8	45	45	45 (until 19:00)
11	Central Market	10th Military Street	8.7	45—92	45—92	45—92 (until 19:00)
Cancelled routes
№	Starting point	End point	Notes			
2	Yacht Club	4th Slobidska Street	Abolished in 1992			
4	Central Market	City Hospital	Circular narrow gauge, counterclockwise. Discontinued in 1965			
5	Central Market	City Hospital	Circular narrow gauge, clockwise. Discontinued in 1965			
8	Yacht Club	City Hospital	Narrow gauge, abolished in the 1960s			
9	Central Market	Cosmonauts Street				
	10th Military Street	Shyroka Balka	Special trams to transport workers of the Zorya — Mashproekt plant, two cars in the morning and evening respectively			

== Tram Depot ==
The system is served by one depot, which is located in the city centre at 17 Andreeva Street.

== Fares ==
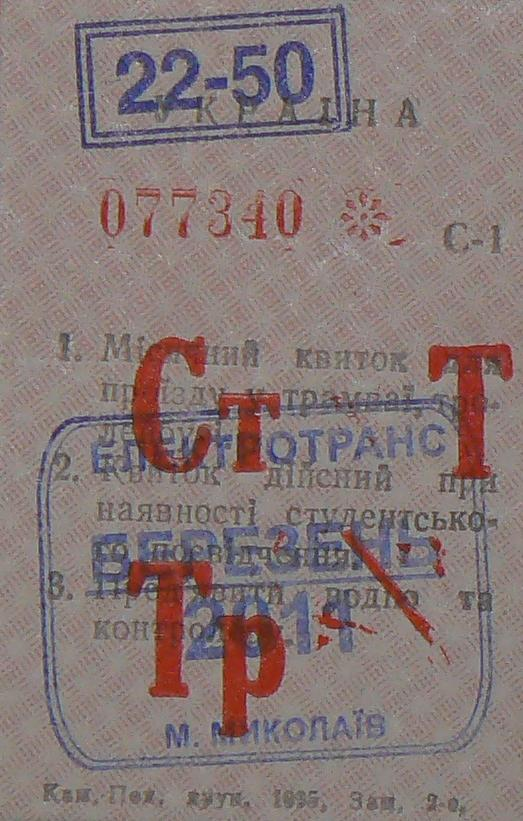
Monthly travel ticket (student), March 2011

The fare of a single ticket is ₴10 (or ₴8 for payment by QR code). Students may buy a single ticket for ₴5 at specialized kiosks.

Electronic Transport Ticket Prices (as of May 2025)
Type of travel	1 day, ₴	7 days, ₴	15 days, ₴	1 Month	1 Month (Student)
Trolleybus	-	100	225	400	250
Tram	-	100	225	400	250
Trolleybus and tram	25	150	300	550	300

Travel tickets can be purchased at specialized kiosks of the municipal enterprise "Mykolaivelectrotrans" at the following addresses:

- Centralny Avenue/3rd Slobidska;
- "Kolos" market ("Bus station" stop);
- Black Sea Shipyard (turning loop);
- Zakhisnykyv Mykolaiv/Sinna Street;
- Zakhisnyky Mykolaiv/Mark Kropyvnytskyi St.;
- Heroes of Ukraine Avenue (Shkilna stop);
- Kosmonavtiv St./Industrial Zone;
- Kosmonavtiv St./Bogoyavlensky Ave.; and
- "Kolos" market tram stop.

Historical fares of trams and trolleybuses
Fare establishment date	Cost of a single ticket (₴)	Cost of monthly travel tickets (₴)					
Fare establishment date	Cost of a single ticket (₴)	Student		Regular		For Enterprises	
Fare establishment date	Cost of a single ticket (₴)	Tram or trolleybus (ToT)	Both	ToT	Both	ToT	Both
August 25, 2008	0.75	18	22.5	36	45	54	90
April 4, 2011	1	20	25	40	50	?	?
December 3, 2014	1.5	30	38	60	75	80	135
August 1, 2016	2	55	70	100	125	140	220
June 11, 2018	3	85	105	150	190	210	330
October 25, 2019	5	140	175	250	315	350	545
June 1, 2021	6						

== Interesting facts ==
- In the 1930s, during rail replacement, the old rails began to be used as electric poles. They can still be found in Mykolaiv to this day.
- The Korabelny district is the only one of the 4 districts of the city where there is still no tram service.

== Gallery ==
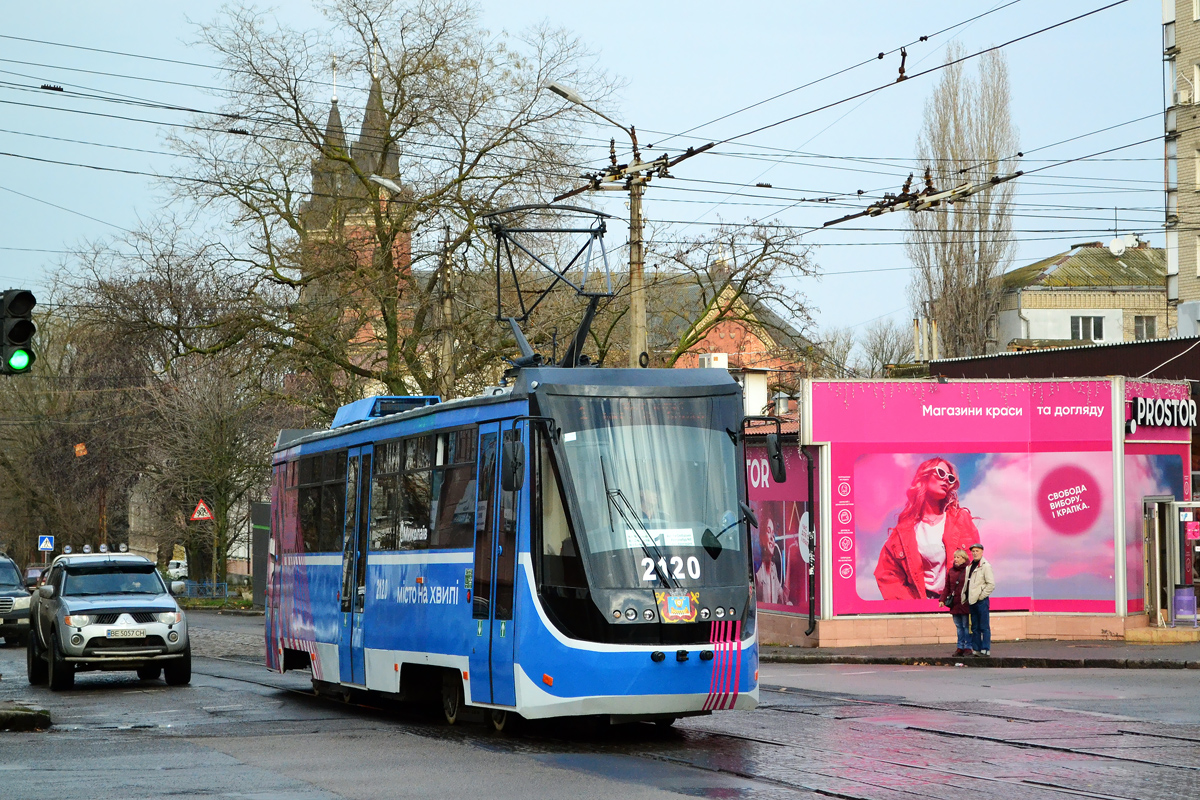
KTM-5MZVP (local modernization) on Dekabristov Street

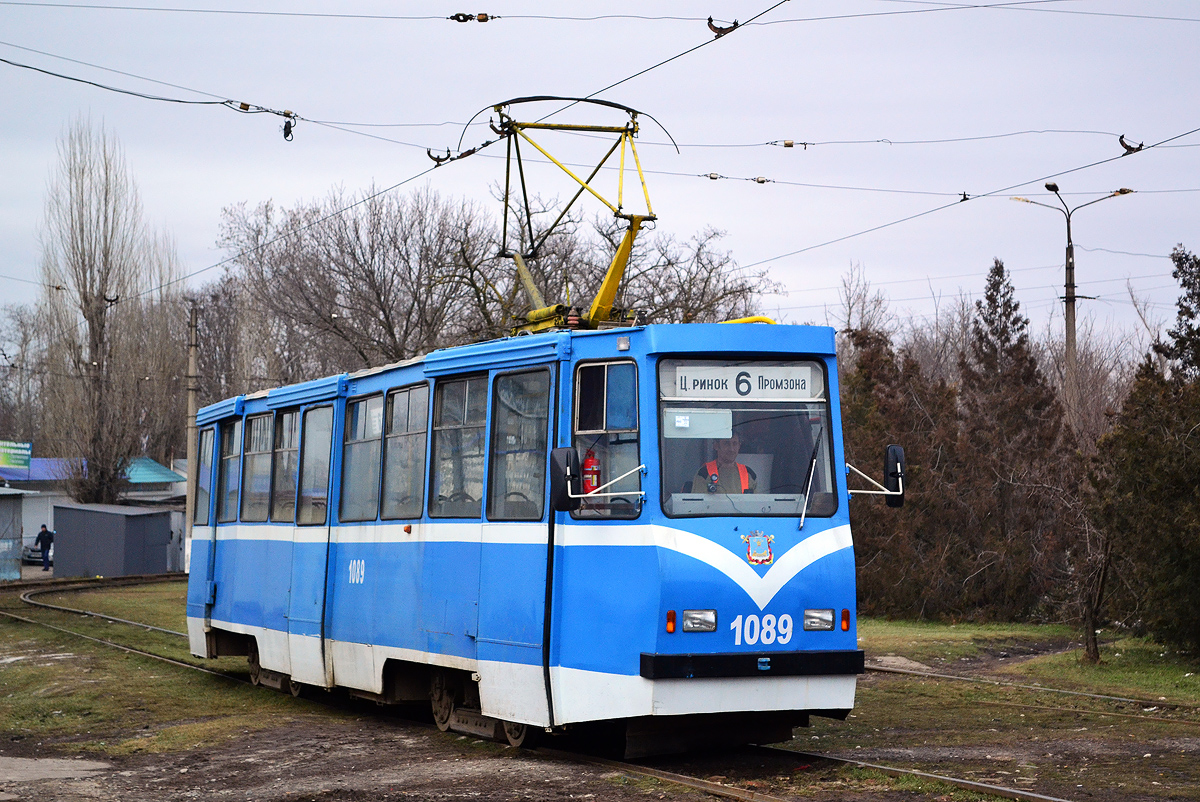
KTM-5M3 at the final stop "Industrial Zone"

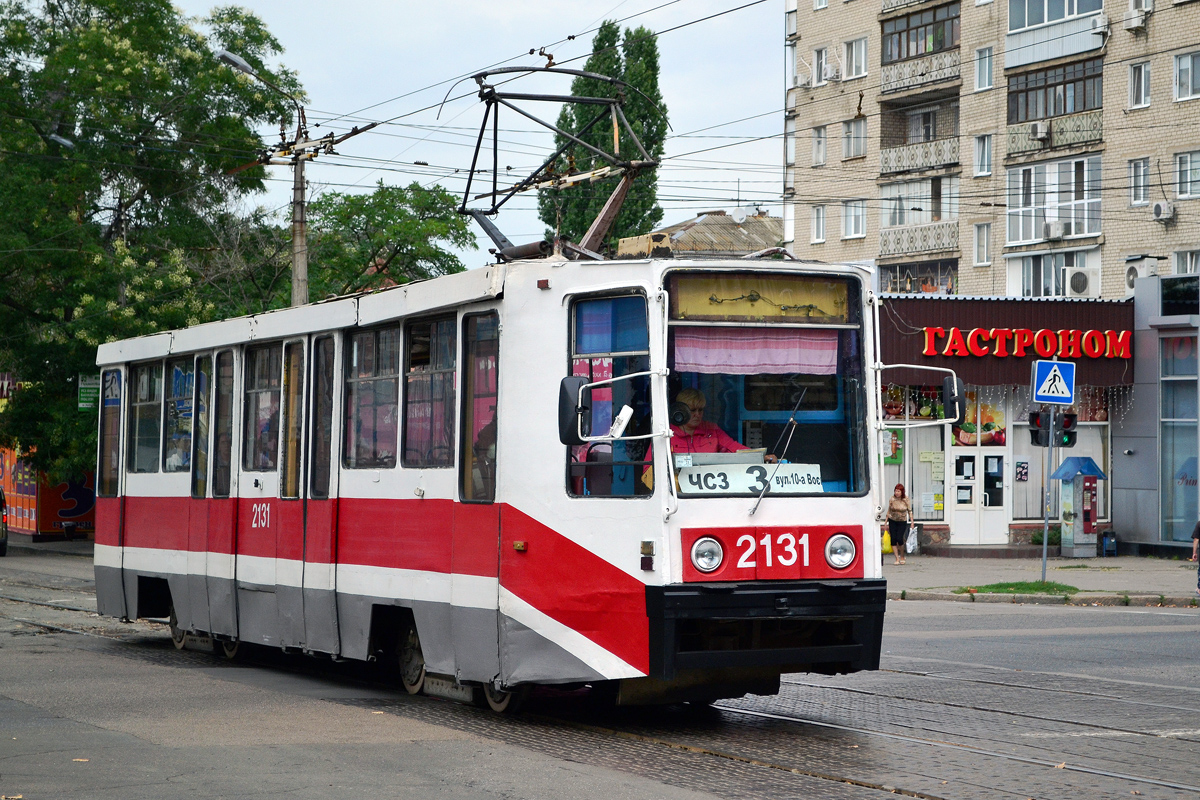
71-608K on Dekabristov Street

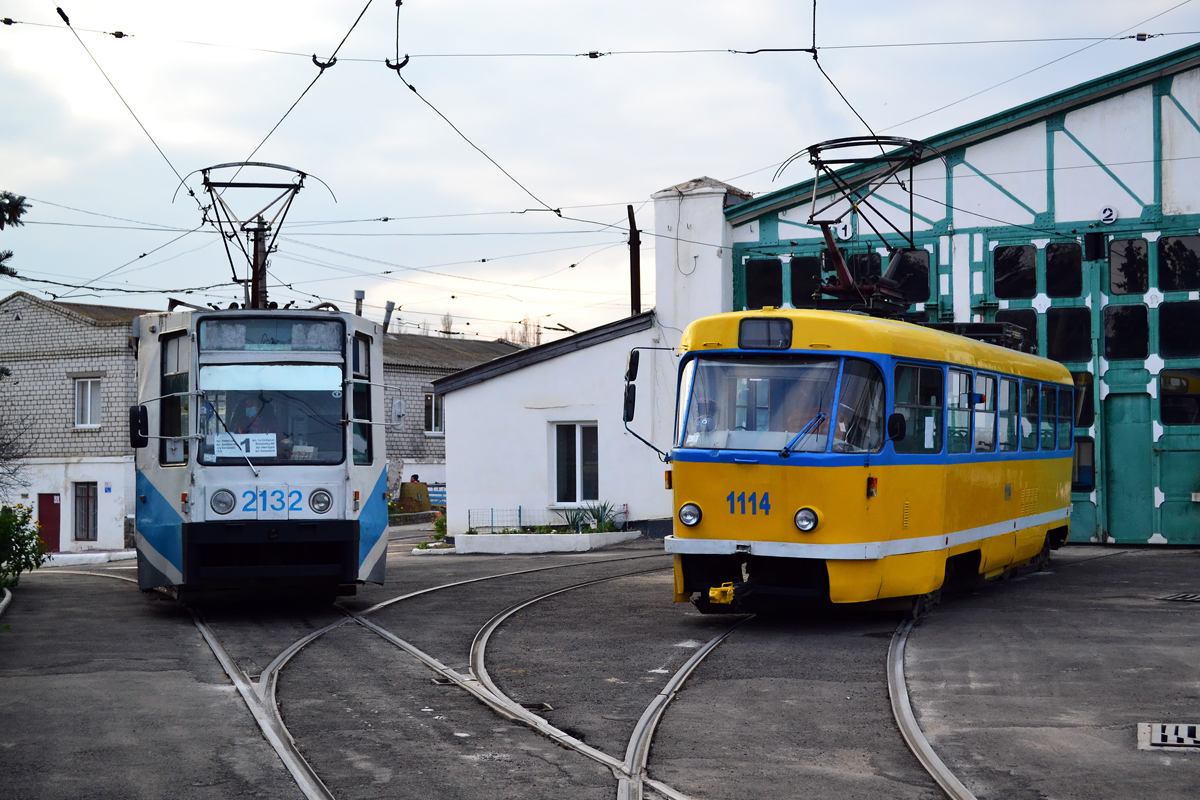
KTM 71-608 and Tatra T3A at the tram depot

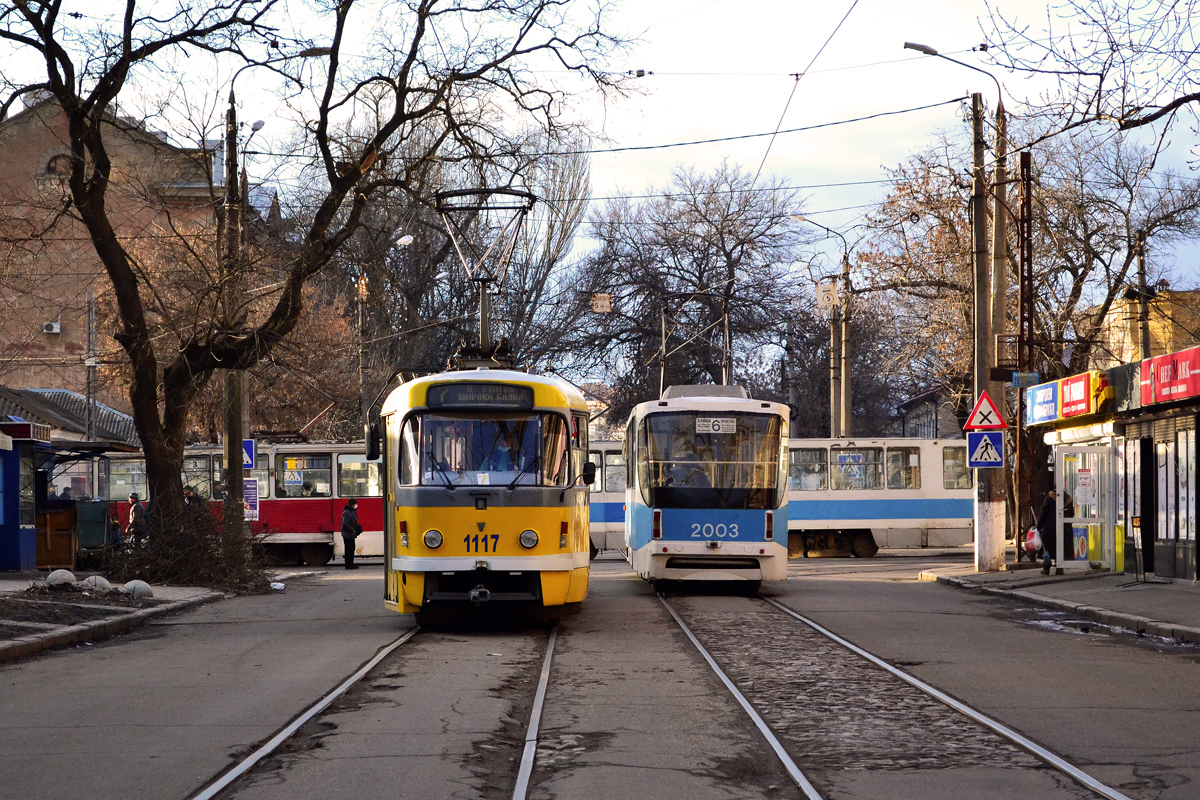
Trams at the intersection of Sinna and Dekabristov streets near the Central Control Point

== Sources ==
- V. V. Rozaliev. History of the Nikolaev Tram (1915—2005). — Moscow, 2007. — 338 p. Scientific publication under the auspices of the Vavilov Institute of Electrical and Electronic Engineering, Russian Academy of Sciences
- Govorukha, Alexander (2001). The Age of the Nikolaev Tram (in Russian) (Omnibus ed.). Archived from the original on 2015-11-22.
- Govorukha, Alexander (2002). The Age of the Nikolaev Tram (in Russian) (Omnibus ed.). Archived from the original on 2015-11-17.
- Alexander Govorukha (2002). The Age of the Nikolaev Tram (in Russian) (Omnibus ed.). Archived from the original on 2017-10-11.
- Alexander Govorukha. (2002). The Age of the Nikolaev Tram (in Russian) (Omnibus ed.). Archived from the original on 2011-11-13.
- Margulis, Svetlana (2015). History of the Nikolaev Tram (in Russian) (Yuzhnaya Pravda ed.).
- Shynkarenko, Andrey (2010). Nikolaev Tram Tickets Dedicated to… (in Russian) (Nikolaevskiy Bazar ed.).
