= Stilyaga (disambiguation) =

Stilyaga is Russian derogatory term for a person and a subculture obsessed with fashion.

Stilyaga or Stilyagi may also refer to:

- a nickname for Soviet LM-57 tramcar
- Stilyagi (film), a Russian comedy musical film about the subculture
