= LM-49 =

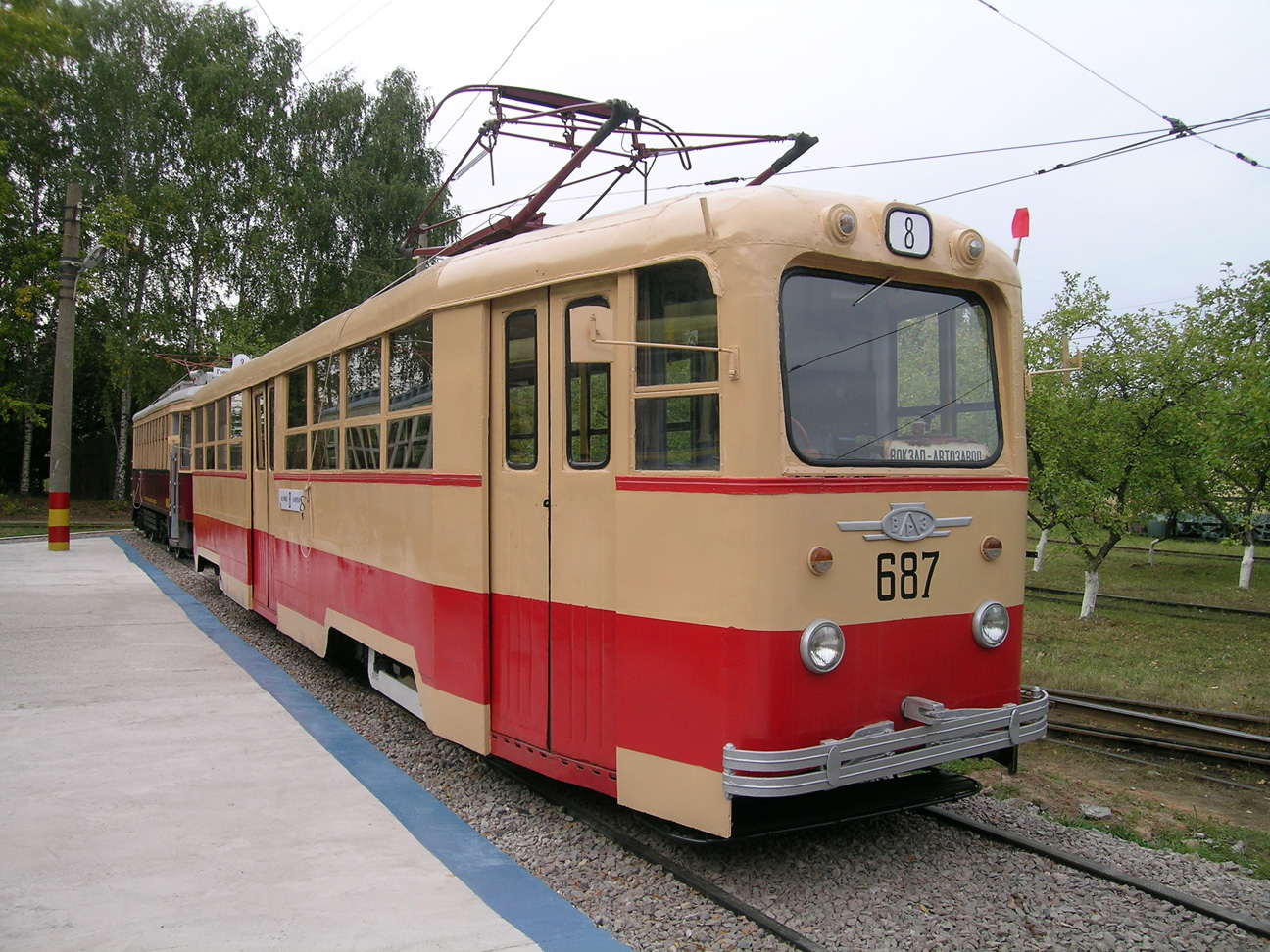
Museum LM-49 tramcar in Nizhny Novgorod, Russia

The LM-49 (Russian: ЛМ-49) is the Soviet motor four-axle tramcar. The first prototype of this vehicle was built in 1949 (hence the 49 in the name) at the Leningrad Wagon Repair Plant (VARZ, ВАРЗ, Ленинградский Вагоноремонтный Завод - Russian abbreviature and full name). "LM" means Leningrad Motor tramcar. These tramcars were utilized in Leningrad itself and some other Soviet cities such as Minsk, Gorky (now Nizhny Novgorod), Novokuznetsk and Magnitogorsk. VARZ produced in total 287 LM-49s for Leningrad and 113 for other cities.

Inhabitants of Leningrad nicknamed LM-49 the "Elephant". Usually the LM-49 worked in pairs, pulling an unpowered wagon designated LP-49 (ЛП-49). The mass production of LM-49 ceased in 1960 when they were replaced by next model of VARZ, LM-57. The last LM-49s were withdrawn from city service in 1982–83. In general, Soviet tram drivers and repairmen regarded the LM-49 as a very durable and reliable tramcar. The withdrawal was carried out due to centralized pressure to renew Soviet trams rather than risk failures from old age. Many LM-49s were still operable when scrapped.

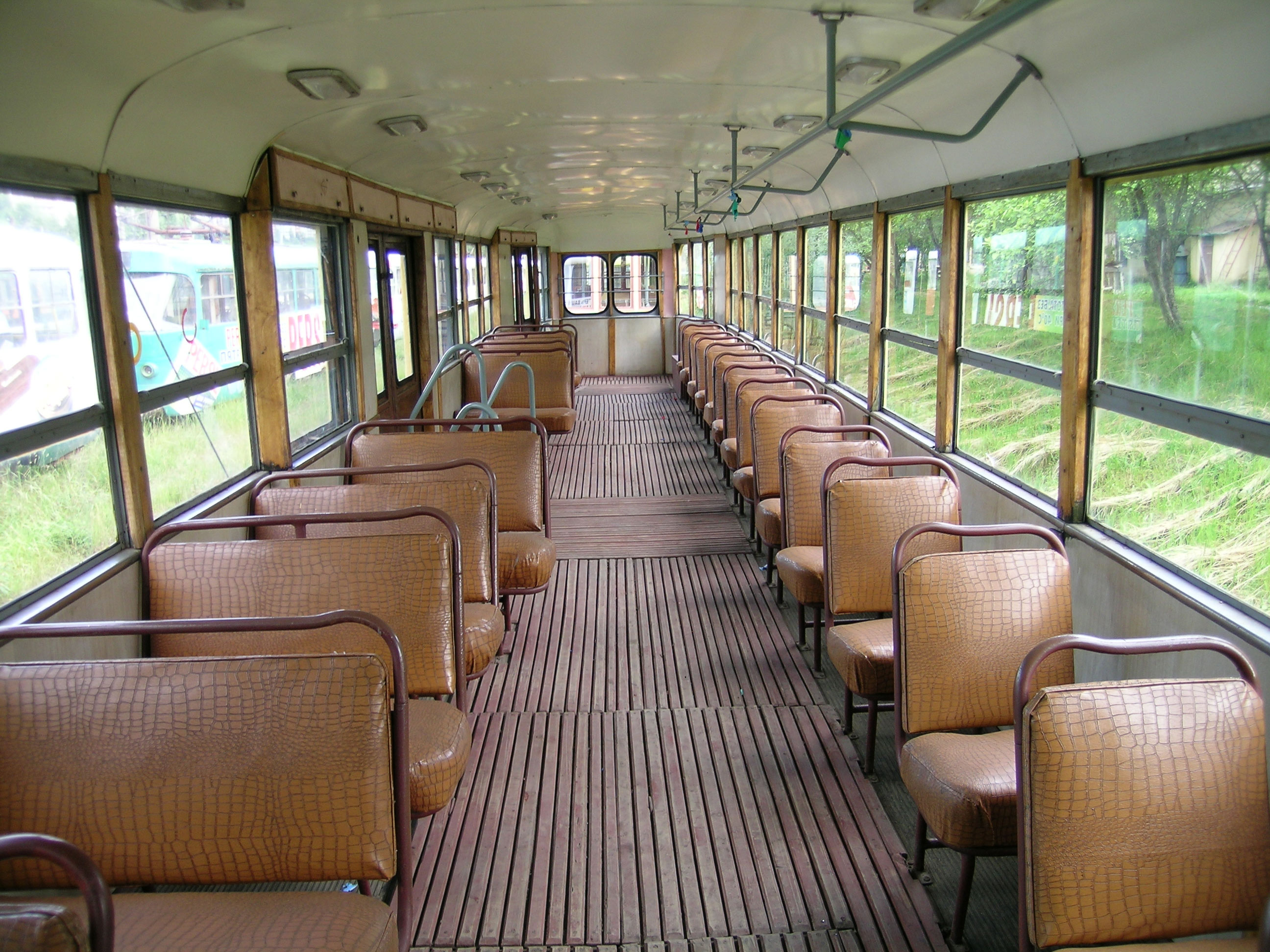
Museum Nizhny Novgorod LM-49 tramcar interior

Museum Nizhny Novgorod LM-49 controller unit

Museum Nizhny Novgorod LM-49 driver's cabin

== Technical details ==
The LM-49 is a broad gauge (1524 mm or 60 inch) high-floor, four-axle tramcar. Its full-metal hull is mounted on a massive steel carriage with two double-axle bogies. The hull has three wide doors which have pneumatic gears for opening and closing. The main brake system is also pneumatic. The LM-49 is equipped with four 55 kW electric motors and is able to reach a top speed of 55 km/h (34 mph). It utilizes a direct mechanical control of electric current to the motors. Initially LM-49s did not have a low-voltage subsystem, but one was added later for external brakes and turn light signals. The vehicle has 35 seats and is able to transport nearly 200 passengers at full capacity. The three main dimensions of LM-49 are 15000 mm length, 2550 mm width and 3085 mm height, with an overall weight without passengers of 19.5 metric tons.

== Operation in USSR cities ==
The majority of the LM/LP-49s worked in Leningrad. However, this is first type of Leningrad-produced tramcar which was also manufactured for other cities. Starting in 1958, LM/LP-49s were supplied to Gorky, Novokuznetsk, and Magnitogorsk. One LM-49 motor car was given to the residents of Minsk in the year of 1959. In 1965 all the LM/LP-49s from Novokuznetsk were transferred to Gorky.

=== 1970s, the start of extinction ===
By the late 1970s and early 1980s, the LM/LP-49s were being drawn out of use, although their condition would have allowed for continued service. The management of the Minsk Residential community of the USSR insisted on rolling stock upgrades to more modern units. This was the main reason why the most durable trams of the Stalin Era were retired.

=== 1980s, the extinction ===
As a result, in March 1983 the last LM/LP-49 tram was removed from passenger service. Newer LP-49s worked for some time as trains, while the LM-68 and LM-68M were motor cars. By the middle of 1984 the last LP-49 in Leningrad was removed from passenger service. In Gorky, LM/LP-49 cars were removed from passenger service even earlier, between 1975 and 1980. According to the memories of Gorsky Tram-Trolleybus property leaders this was done in order to allow more Czech-made Tatra T3 trams in the city. The longest passenger service of LM/LP-49 работали wasin Magnitogorsk—the last couple of this brand left the tram lines in 1987.

After the end of the passenger service a minor part of Leningrad LM/LP-49 stock was rebuilt into service tramssuch as tower trams for serving the catenary and towing units for track polishing machines VPRS-500. Neither in Magnitogorsk nor in Gorky were there any service trams made out of LM/LP-49s. However, in Leningrad, Minsk and Gorky one LM/LP-49 train was left in each city for museum purposes. (Refer to the Survivors section) The trams which were neither rebuilt into service trams nor transferred to the museum service were simply cut into metal scrap. In Leningrad a fraction of the trams were moved into a "tram cemetery", and in Magnitogorsk the bodies of two LM49 trams with all the equipment removed and welded windows were rebuilt into a barn.

In all of Leningrad 287 motor cars and 268 trailers cars of this make were listed, in Gorsky City—67 motors and 46 trailers (after the transfer to Novokuznetsk), and in Minsk 1 motor car. The rest of these trams belonged to Magnitogorsk. However, at the time it was a practice to keep a few trams secretly, off the books. This was done to conceal the loss of trams by fire, accidents, and other damage. This practice has obscured the exact number of LM/LP-49 trams.

== Survivors ==
Three LM-49s survive to this day. One LM-49 train and a LP-49 trailer is an operational piece of the St. Petersburg tram collection. The Nizhny Novgorod Tram & Trolley Museum has another single operational LM-49. These LM-49 tramcars can be hired by foreign tourists for city excursions. A group of tramway enthusiasts from many cities in Russia, with guests from Estonia and United States, hired the Nizhny Novgorod Museum LM-49 for their meeting in 2004. The third non-operable LM-49 is kept in Minsk, Belarus, as a memorial for city tramworkers.

The St-Petersburg Tram Collection (SPTC) started in 1996. Its first model was the “1949 Leningrad LM-49 Motor Car with LP-49 trailer car”.

== See also ==
- Tram
- Soviet Tramcar MTV-82 (concurrent vehicle of LM-49)
- Soviet Tramcar LM-57 (successor of LM-49 in mass production)
