= Trams in Odesa =

Electric tram system in Odesa, Ukraine

Odesa urban electric transport
- Одеський міський електротранспорт

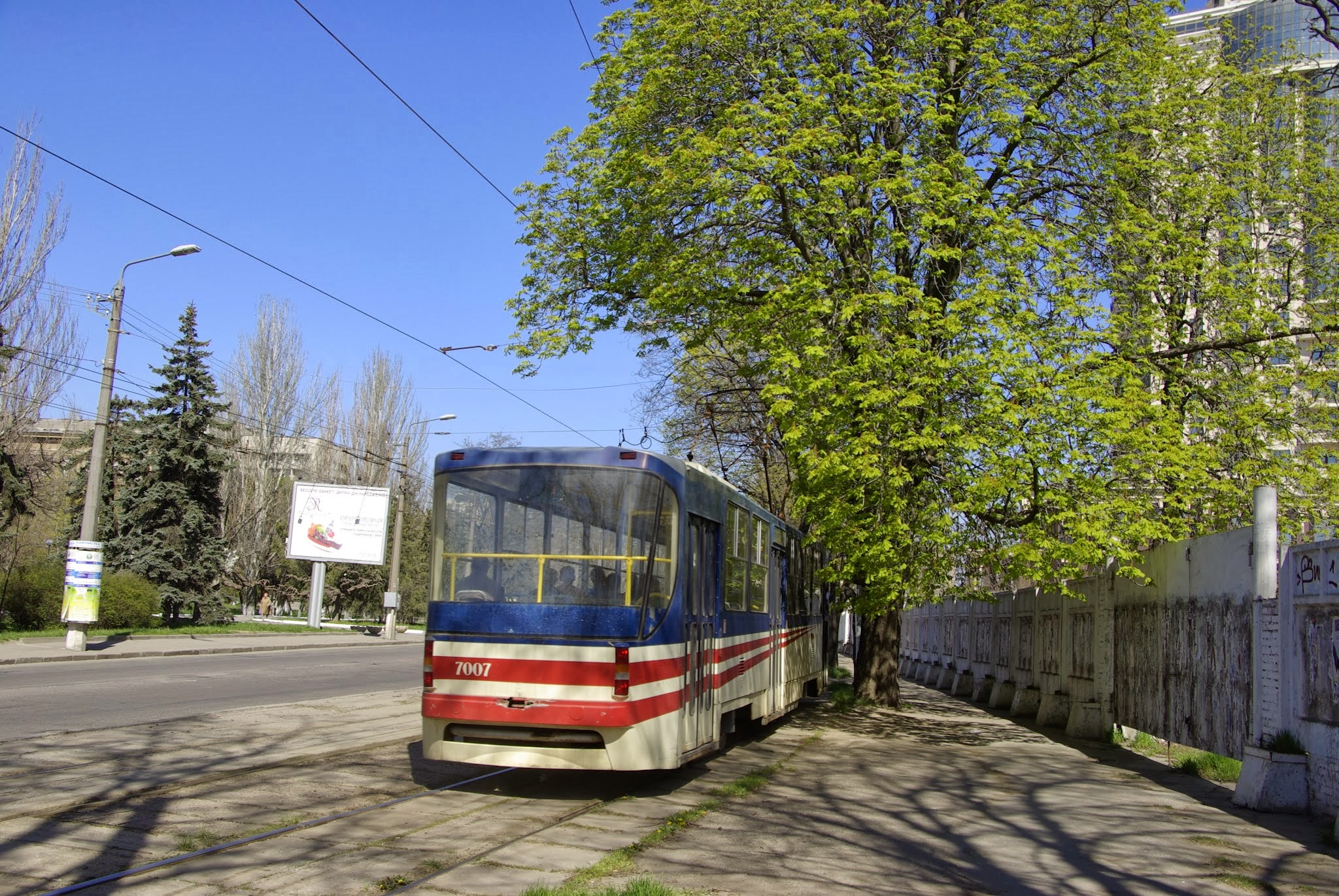
- A K1 tram in Arcadia, 2013

Operation
- Locale: Odesa, Ukraine

Infrastructure
- Track gauge: 1,520 mm (4 ft 11 27/32 in) Russian gauge

Statistics
Electric tram era: since 1910
- Status: Operational
- Routes: 14 routes
- Operator: OdesMiskElektrotrans KP
- Propulsion system: Electricity
- Depot: 2 depots
- Track length (double): 196 km (121.8 mi)
- January–July 2019: 74.543 million ▲12.2%
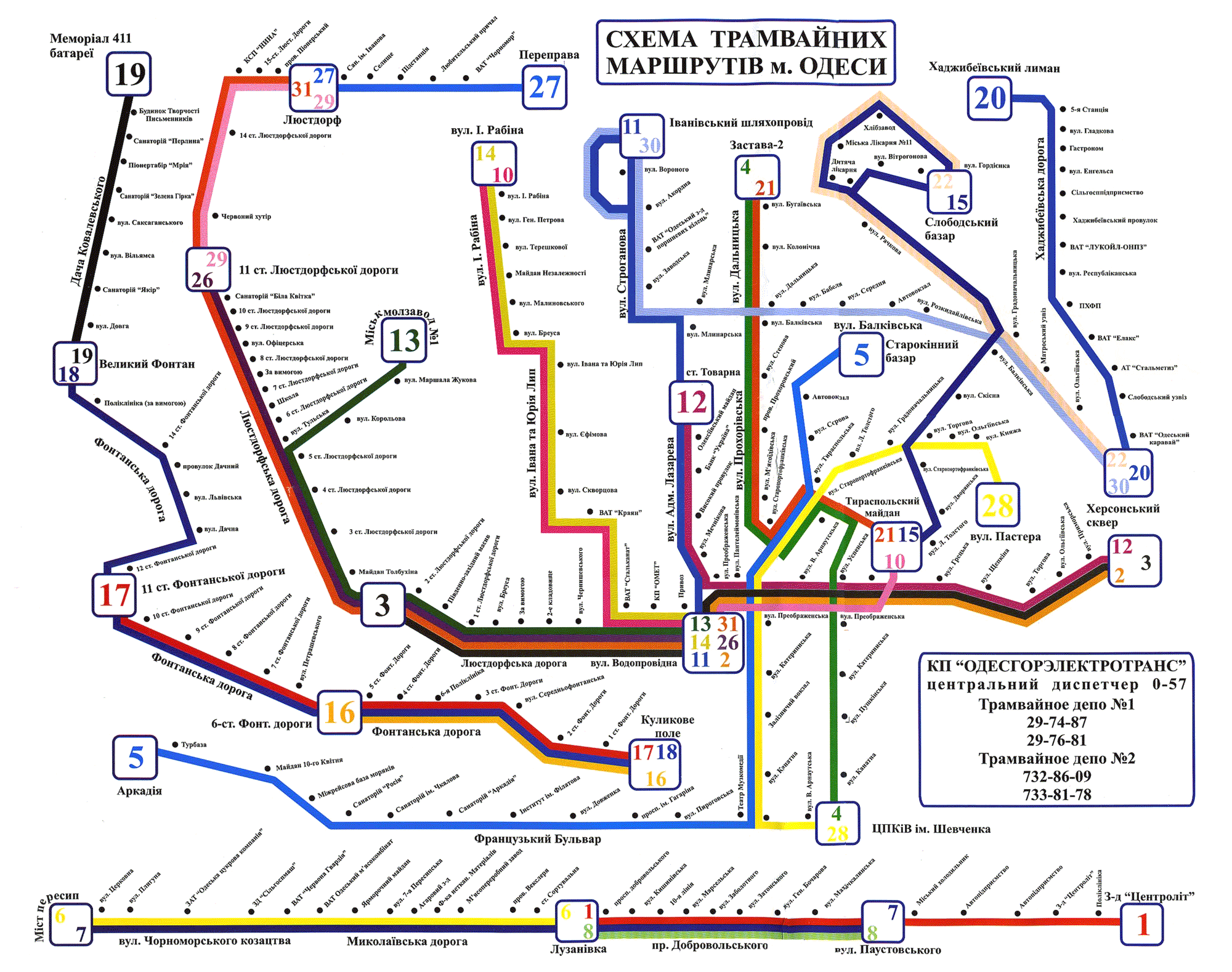
- Website: https://www.oget.od.ua www.oget.od.ua

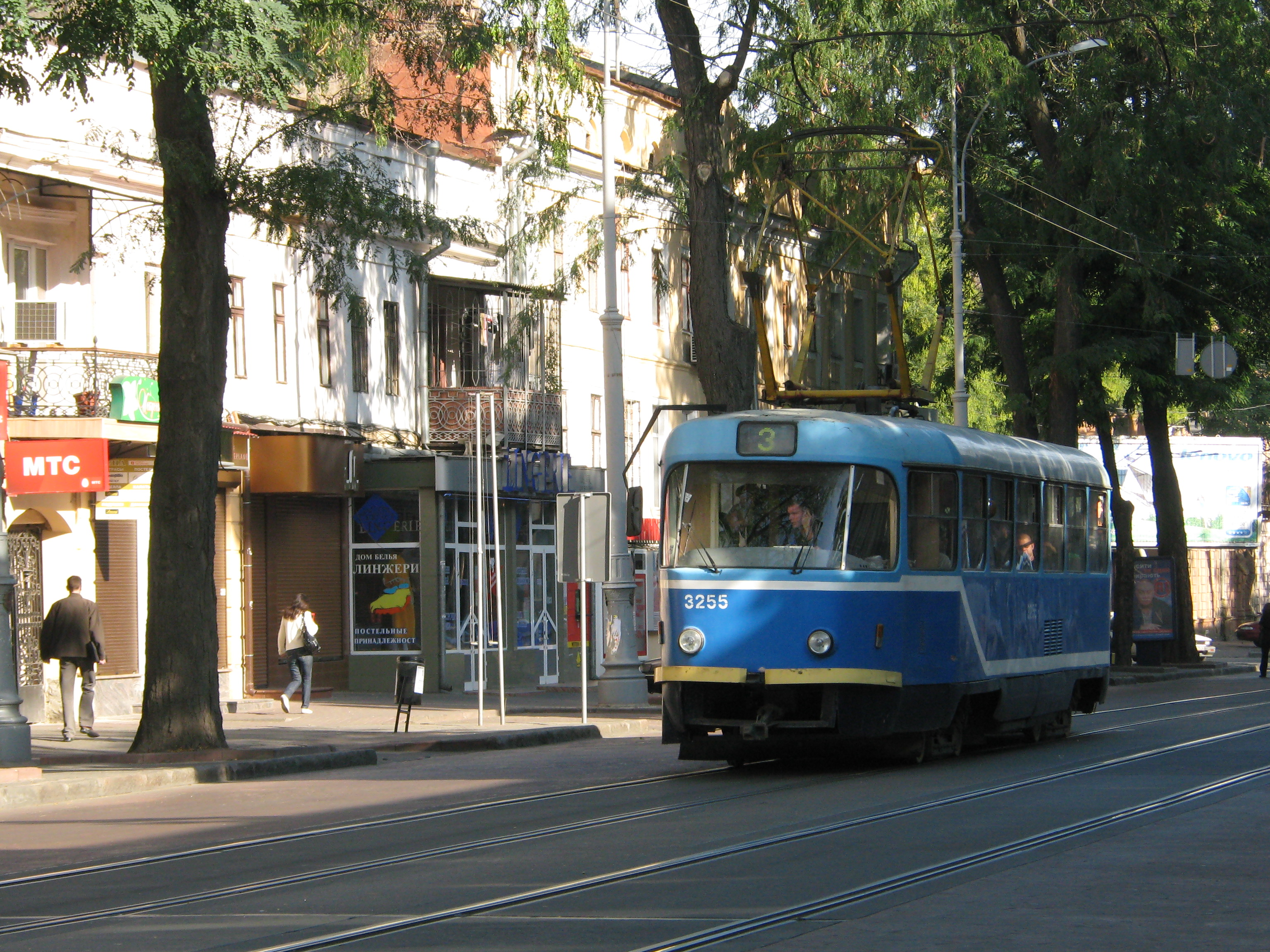
Tatra tram in Odesa

As of mid-2011, trams have been one of the primary modes of public transportation in Odesa, Ukraine. The city operates 13 regular tram routes and one rush hour route. Electric trams have served Odesa since 1910.

The tram network primarily runs along main streets from the city center, providing convenient connections to outer neighborhoods. As of early 2011, Odesa operated 210 Tatra T3 tramcars, 106 of which had been modernized. In 2006, the city began receiving К-1 tramcars manufactured by the Yuzhmash plant in Dnipro, and Tatra-Yug trams are also produced there. Additionally, a heritage tram, the pseudo-Nivelles retro tram, was made from an MTV-82 tram.

Odesa's tram network is served by two depots: one near the railway station and another in the western part of the city, in Slobodka. A service tram depot near the Tovarnaja station used to house passenger service routes until 1996, but now only houses service trams.

As of November 2016, several lines along Preobrazhenska Street, Tiraspol Street, and Nizhyn Street were out of service due to ongoing construction of a new roundabout. The project involved excavation to a depth of one meter and the pouring of concrete slabs. Tracks were being fabricated on-site using straight rails, with work expected to take several more months. During this time, the track along Novoshepnoy Ryad Street was in poor condition, especially near the Privoz market. The asphalt road surface had deteriorated, and the pointwork at Preobrazhenska Street was also in disrepair, forcing trams and vehicles to travel at very slow speeds over the exposed rails.

By October 2018, the roundabout on Preobrazhenska Street was operational, allowing trams to travel in any direction. However, operational issues persisted, particularly with the tracks and pointwork in Novoshepnoy Street, which remained unchanged since 2016. In 2018, services along two routes ceased for extended periods on the same day due to the removal of turn-back facilities, which had previously allowed trams to continue partial service during breakdowns. The lack of cross-links to reroute trams in case of incidents, along with the continued use of single-ended trams, further exacerbated these issues. Unlike double-ended trams, which can reverse direction at shunts, single-ended trams require loops or turnouts to change direction.

On December 21, 2023, Odesa received the first of 13 Tatra-Yug K1T306 trams, ordered in December 2022. These new three-section trams are 26 meters long and feature a 100% low-floor design.

== Route network ==
| No. | Terminals | Remarks |
|---|---|---|
| 1 | Peresyp Bridge — "Centrolit" Plant | Served by 7 trams. By 1997 operated as #9. |
| 5 | Central Bus Station — Arcadia | One of major routes. Served by 9 trams |
| 6 | Peresyp Bridge — Luzanivka | Shortcut version of route # 7 (rush hour time only). In run, starting with 9 AM, also used for "yard moves", when route number 1 comes in service out of Depot #2 (Slobidka Tram Depot) |
| 7 | Paustovsky Street (Tavriya V) - Lustdorf | One of major routes. Served by 28 -40 trams. Route " North - South". |
| 10 | Yitzhak Rabin Street — Starosinna Square (Railway station) | Served by 5-9 trams. By 2000 operated as #14. |
| 11 | Starosinna Square (Railway station) — Alexeyevskaya Plaza | In 2008 it was severely trimmed. Served by 1-2 trams. |
| 12 | Peresyp Bridge — Slobodka Market | Initially this route terminated at Peresyb Bridge, starting with June 1, 2011 was extended, following route cancelled 22. |
| 13 | Shkolny housing estate — Starosinna Square (Railway station) | One of major routes. Served by 3 trams |
| 15 | Slobodka Market — Alexeyevskaya Plaza | Remains unchanged since the moment of first run. Served by 5-6 trams |
| 17 | Kulikovo Field — 11th station of Fountain Road | Short version of route #18. Served by 6 trams |
| 20 | Peresyp Bridge — Khadzhibay Firth | This line is served by 2 trams. |
| 21 | Zastava 2 railway station — Tiraspolskaya Square | Served by 2-3 trams |
| 27 | Fishing Port — Lustdorf | Served by 2 trams. |
| 28 | Shevchenko Park — Paster's Street | Passed along original porto franco line. Served by 4-6 trams |

=== Additional routes ===
3а 2nd station of Lustdorf Road- Tiraspolska Square.

3к 2nd station of Lustdorf Road — Railway station

=== Temporary not in service ===
4 Arcadia — Peresyp Bridge. Closed in 2017.

18 Kulikovo Field — 16th station of Fountain Road. One of major routes. The route is temporarily closed due to repair on 16th station of Fountain Road

19 16th station of Fountain Road — Memorial of 411 Battery. Has a single track line. The route is temporarily closed due to repair on 16th station of Fountain Road

=== Closed routes and phantom routes (after 1990) ===
2 Peresyp Bridge — Railway Station

3 Peresyp Bridge — Lustdorf. Cancelled due to route 7 extension to Lustdorf.

- Used in evening to supplement shortcut runs of route 3. Present of official maps

4 Zastava 2 — Shevchenko Park

- cancelled in 2005, tracks are demolished, and trolleybus # 2 runs on its way along Uspenskaya Street.

8 Luzanovka — Paustovskogo Street (Tavriya V)

9 "Centrolit" plant — Peresyp Bridge

- cancelled in 1997, was included in routes № 1, 6, 7, 8.

14 Isaac Rabin Street — Railway Station

- Operated as rush hour service in addition to route 10 by 2000. Technically back in service since 2023, but operates under #10.

16 Kulikovo field - 6th station of Fountain Road

22 Slobodka market — Peresyp bridge

26 Starosinna Square (Railway station) — 11th station of Lustdorf Road. Operates occasionally as rush hour service.

29 Lustdorf — 11th station of Lustdorf Road For a long time, used to be what's now known as route 31.

30 Ivanovskiy Viaduct — Peresyp Bridge

- Closed in 2008 due to construction of the North-South auto mainline, which implied the roadway expansion. The construction of the Auto mainline was not completed due toa couple of reasons. Tram route 30 was replaced by 30A bus route. Since this route is served by 2 buses only, almost no one uses it.

31 Lustdorf — Railway Station. Used to be route 29. Since 2015 replaced by route 3. Cancelled.
