= LM-57 =

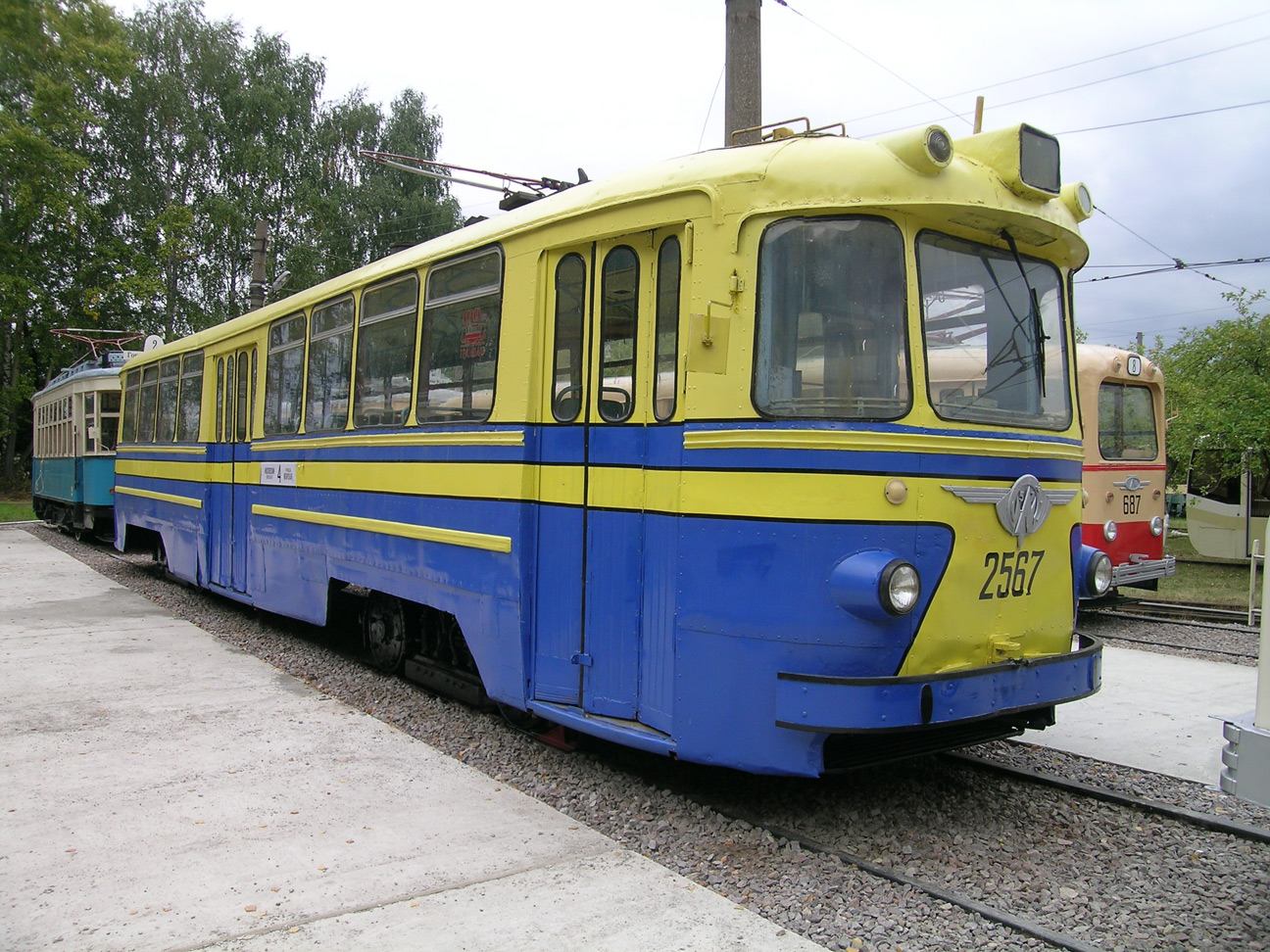
Museum LM-57 tramcar in Nizhny Novgorod, Russia.

The LM-57 (Russian ЛМ-57) is the Soviet motor four-axle tramcar. First prototype of this vehicle was built in 1957 (hence the 57 in the name) at the Leningrad Wagon Repair Plant (VARZ, ВАРЗ, Ленинградский Вагоноремонтный Завод - Russian abbreviature and full name). "LM" means Leningrad Motor tramcar. The VARZ produced nearly 800 LM-57s in 1957–1968.

The LM-57 has streamlined forms, which were common for vehicles in many countries in the end of the 1950s. First LM-57 also had a big number of chromized parts and a big front emblem but, the mass production LM-57 had fewer decorations tram forever. The LM-57 had a nickname Stilyaga (Russian Стиляга), meaning The Dandy for its external appearance.

LM-57 tramcars worked in Leningrad, Kiev, Tashkent, Gorky, Magnitogorsk, Kazan, Saratov, Arkhangelsk and Nizhny Tagil. The last LM-57s were withdrawn from city service in 1983–85. Unlike LM-49 withdrawal, many LM-57s were on the edge of complete exhaustion at this time. This was a consequence of metal economy policy, started in the beginning of the 1960s. Main goal of such policy was maximum increase of tramcar mass production. As a result, the frame of LM-57 was not strong and durable in comparison with less complicated pre-war and first post-war tramcars.

== Technical Details ==
The LM-57 is a broad gauge (1,524 mm (5 ft)) high-floor, four-axle, one-sided tramcar. Its full-metal aluminium hull is mounted on a steel carriage with two double-axle bridge-type bogies with single suspension stage. The hull has three doors (one narrow in front end and two wide in the middle and rear end). The doors have pneumatic gears for opening and closing. The main brake system is also pneumatic. The LM-57 is equipped with four 45 kW electric motors and is able to reach a top speed of 65 km/h. It utilizes a direct, mechanical control of electric current to the motors. The main control device is the hand-operated multipositional controller for resistor groups commutation in motors power cirquit. Initially LM-57s did not have a low-voltage subsystem, but this was added later for external brakes and turn light signals. The vehicle has 37 seats and is able to transport 207 passengers at full capacity (8 passengers per square meter). The three main dimensions of LM-49 are 15000 mm length, 2550 mm width and 3080 mm height; overall weight without passengers is 18.5 metric tons.

The LM-57 is a dedicated single tramcar. It had neither unmotored trailer modification nor ability for work in a train from some motor tramcars (due to direct current regulation system). But in Gorky local inventors managed to build a train from two LM-57s. They constructed a pneumatic gear for transmission controller handle movements from the first wagon to the second one. This train successfully worked until its old age withdrawal. The photo of this train is available here. However, this work had not any continuation, the train from two LM-57s remained in single number.

== Survivors ==
Three LM-57 survived to this day. One LM-57 is an operational piece of the St. Petersburg tram collection. This LM-57 tramcar can be hired by foreign tourists for city excursions. The Nizhny Novgorod tram & trolley museum has another non-operable LM-57 as memorial tramcar. Another is in Minsk as a static museum car.

== See also ==
- Tram
- Soviet Tramcar MTV-82
- Soviet Tramcar LM-49
