= LM-68M =

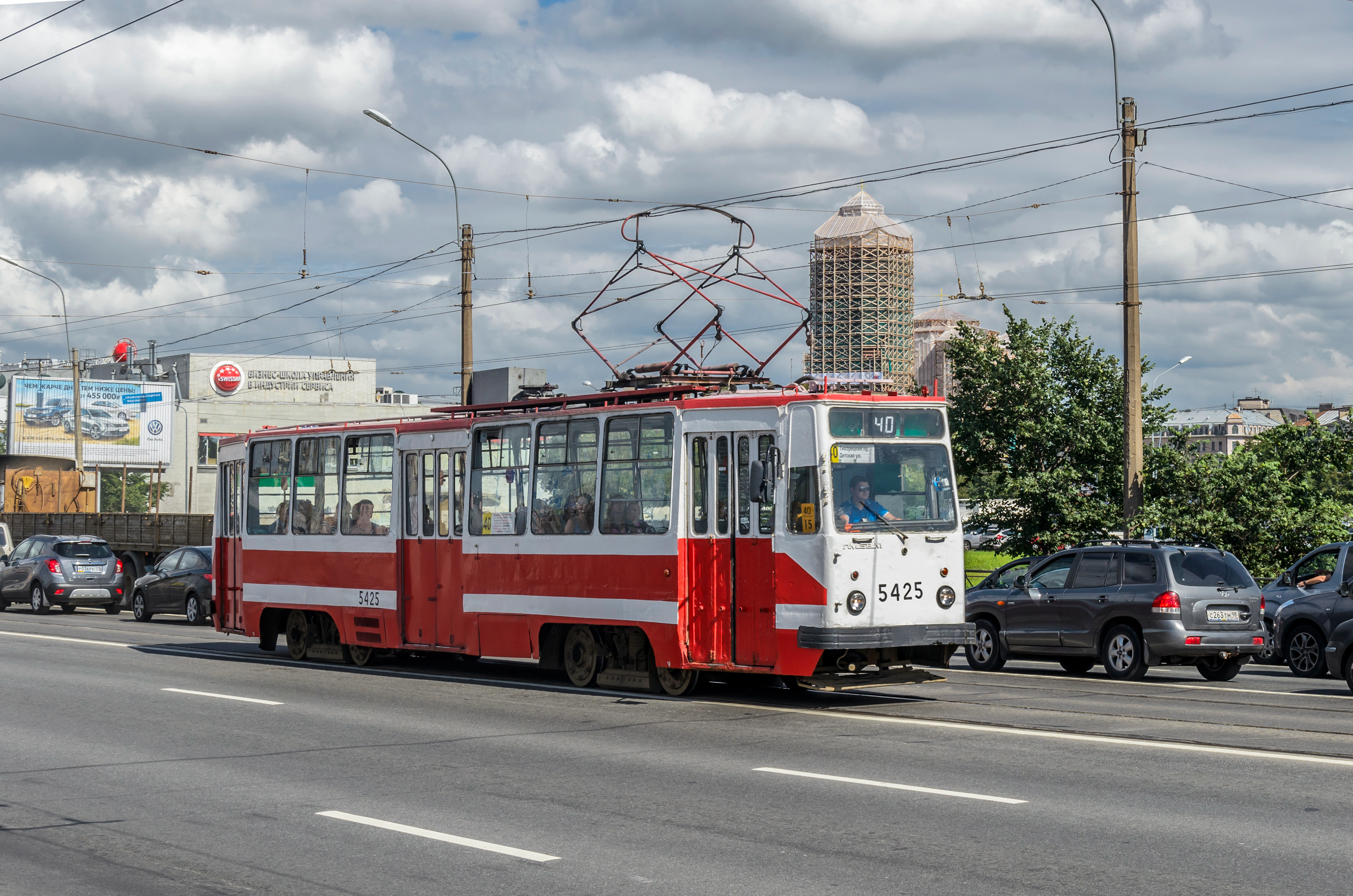
LM-68M on Tuchkov Bridge in Saint Petersburg

LM-68M is a Soviet-made four axle tram (streetcar). LM stands for «Ленинградский Моторный», which is a motor car made in Leningrad. LM68M is a further development of an LM-68 tram. Production began in 1974 and continued until 1988.

LM-68M trams work in St. Petersburg

== Technical specifics ==
LM-68M is a wide gauge (1,524 mm (5 ft)) high floor, continuously welded four axle tram. Its body differs from the LM-68 body by an emphasized frame and removed glass on the roof, which created a lot of problems in use. The LM-68M is identical to LM-68 in its pneumatic equipment. The LM-68M tram has 35 seats and is capable of transporting 206 passengers when fully loaded. LM-68M cars are 15 meters (49 ft) long, 2,550 millimeters (100 in) wide and 3,170 millimeters (125 in) high; net weight is 19.5 tonnes. The tram is capable of working as a multiple traction system.

== Modifications ==
- LM-68M — one side, or single ended tram.
- 71-88G (23M0000) — double ended, two-cab version of LM-68M. Used in Cheryomushki (Sayano-Shushinskaya hydro-electric station) as passenger vehicles and in St Petersburg as departmental vehicle.

== See also ==
- Tramways in Saint Petersburg
