= MTV-82 =

Soviet-made tramcar

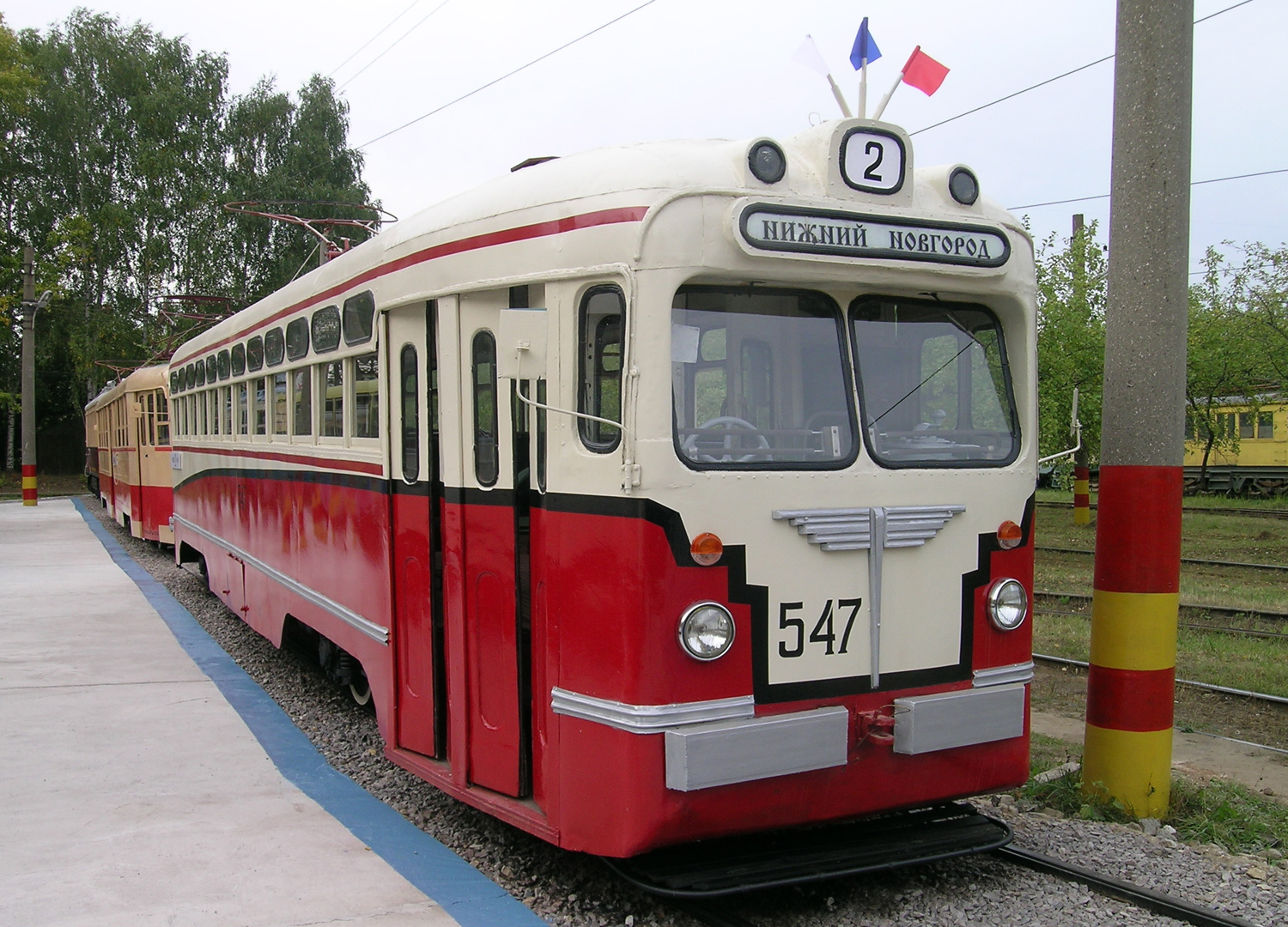
Museum MTV-82 tramcar in Nizhny Novgorod, Russia.

MTV-82 (Russian: МТВ-82, with МТВ standing for Московский Трамвай, Moskovskiy Tramvay, 'Moscow Tramway') is a Soviet four-axle tramcar.

The first prototype of the MTV-82 tramcar was built at Military Factory No. 82 (from which the 82 in the model name is derived) in 1946. Mass production started in 1947 in Factory No. 82, and it was transferred to Rīgas Vagonbūves Rūpnīca (RVR; Russian: Рижский Вагонный Завод, РВЗ) in 1949. In 1961 mass production of MTV-82 in Riga ceased, with production switching to its direct successor, the RVZ-6 tramcar. In total, Factory No. 82 and RVR produced 453 and 1707 MTV-82s respectively.

Up to 1983, these tramcars ran in many Soviet cities and towns, for example in Moscow, Kyiv, Gorky, Sverdlovsk, and Vladivostok. The Soviet tram drivers and repairmen liked the MTV-82 very much for its simplicity, reliability and durability. Most MTV-82s were in operable state before scrapping, but renovation of Soviet trams was fatal for many types of "old-fashioned" Soviet tramcars (see also LM-49).

== Technical details ==
MTV-82 is a 1,524 mm (5 ft) gauge high-floor four-axle tram. It has a full metal body which is mounted on a massive steel carriage with two double-axle bogies. The car has two double doors at each end, which have pneumatic gear for opening and closing. The main brake system is also pneumatic. MTV-82 is equipped with four 55 kW (74 hp) electric motors and is capable of a maximum speed of 55 km/h (34 mph). The controller for motors uses direct current. Initially the MTV-82 did not have a low-voltage system, but this was added later for external braking and turn light signalization. The vehicle has 40 seats and is able to transport nearly 120 passengers with a full load. The MTV-82 is 13.611 m (44 ft 7.9 in) in length, 2,550 mm (8 ft 4 in) in width, and nearly 3,000 mm (9 ft 10 in) in height. The overall weight without passengers is 17.5 t (19.3 short tons).

== History ==
Shortly after the end of World War II a strong need in new trolleybuses became apparent. This was due to a massive conversion from trams to trolley buses in many cities in the USSR. Due to this issue, the Motor and Automobile Research Institute developed a unified vehicle body, a copy of General Motors design, for buses and trolleybuses.

- The production of such trolleybuses started in 1946. While the plant produced only 70 complete trolleybuses, the number of produced bodies was much higher. The plant did not have a sufficient number of motor and traction parts to turn the produced bodies into complete trolleybuses. The bodies were simply stored in plant warehouses.
- In order to get out of this situation, Anton Ivanovich Livinenko, chief engineer of the Moscow Tram Council, suggested the bodies to be used in tram production. Eventually, the bodies were converted to trams with help from the Transportation Overhaul Plant in Sokolniki. This re-engineering turned out to be very successful. In comparison with MTB-82 Trolleybus, the capacity was increased to 120, 55 of which were seated.
- In early 1947 similarly with MTB-82 trolleybus, this model of tram became the MTV-82 tram.

== MTV-82 in Non-Revenue Service ==
The legendary endurance and reliability of MTV-82 trams makes them ideal for use in non-revenue service. After being retired or removed from passenger service, many MTV-82 trams were converted into service trams. They could be used for towing other trams, as hoppers, freight trams, etc. In the cities of Odesa, and Zaporizhzhia, in Ukraine, a couple of MTV-82 trams were rebuilt into unique double-ended version. In Odesa, such 2-cab trams were in use on the picturesque single track route #19. In Zaporizhzhia they were used on route #5.

== Preservation ==
Three MTV-82s survive. Moscow and Yekaterinburg have two operable MTV-82 in their tramway systems. Nizhny Novgorod tram & trolley museum has a third operable MTV-82 in its tramcar collection. These MTV-82s do not serve as usual tramcars, but can be hired for city excursions (but this is quite a long, formal and bureaucratic procedure in today's Russia). A group of tramway enthusiasts from many cities of Russia with guests from Estonia and United States hired Nizhny Novgorod Museum MTV-82 for their meeting in 2004.

In Ukraine, the Odesa Transport Authority has found unique solutions to existing MTV tramcars in their possession. One of them is car #914, which was converted into an open "retro-style" excursion tram. Its design was modified to commemorate Pullmans of the early 20th century, along with historical dark-red livery. Car #914 can be seen running both along the "excursion routes" and Route 5, the most picturesque tram route in Odesa.

== See also ==
- Tram
- Soviet Tramcar LM-49
