= Zaporizhzhia Tram =

Light rail transit system in Zaporizhzhia, Ukraine

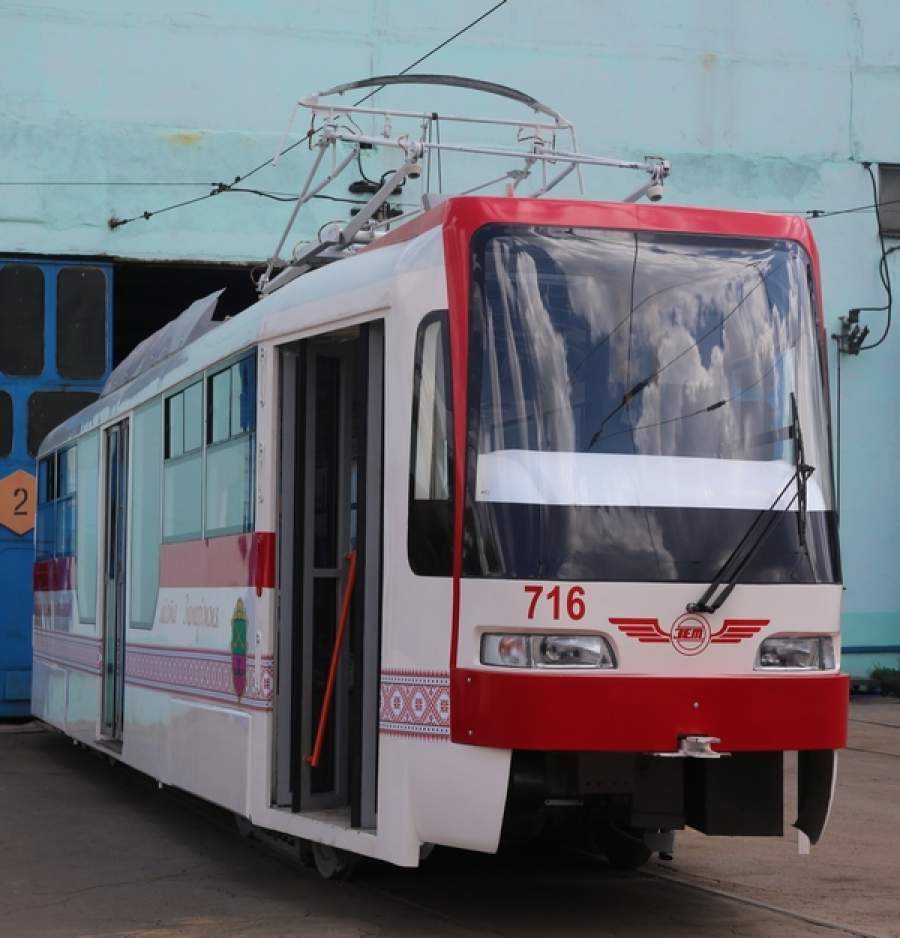
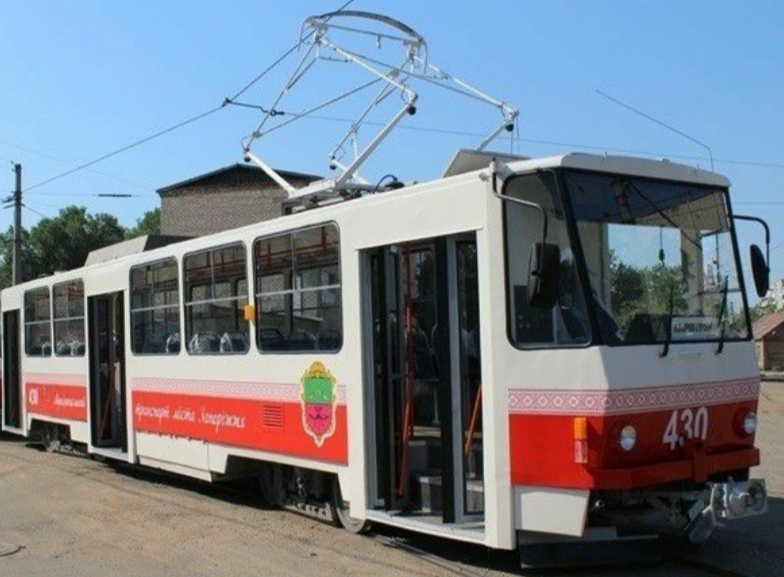
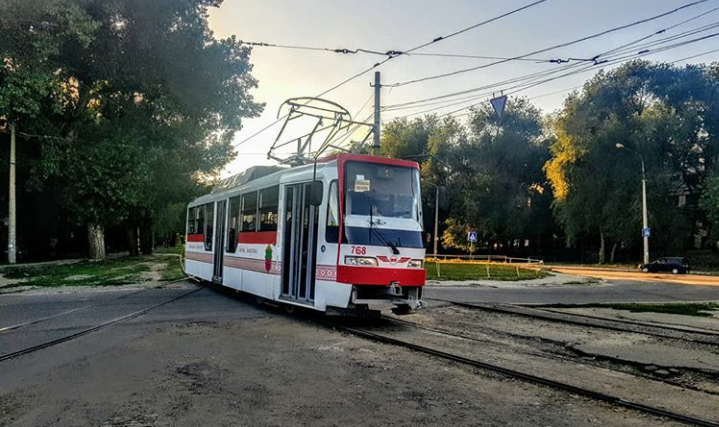
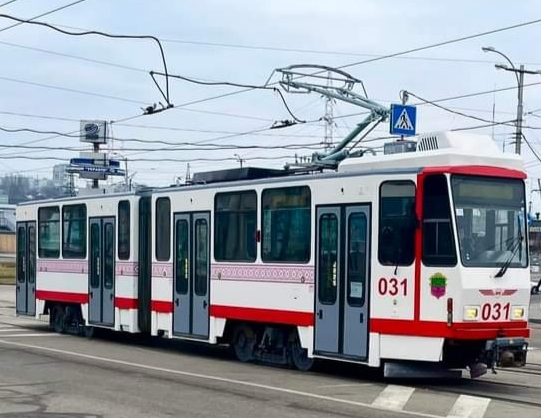

Overview
- Owner: Zaporizhzhia Tram and Trolleybus Management
- Locale: Zaporizhzhia
- Transit type: Tram
- Number of lines: 7
- Daily ridership: 100,500

Operation
- Operation will start: July 17, 1932
- Operators: Zaporizhzhia Tram and Trolleybus Management
- Number of vehicles: 142
- Train length: 16 m

Technical
- System length: 99.345
- Track gauge: 1524 mm
- Top speed: 65 km/h

The Zaporizhzhia Tram is a tram network in the city of Zaporizhzhia, Ukraine. The network comprises 7 routes spanning 157.9 km of which 99.345 km are in use. The tram began operating on July 17, 1932. Service on the system has been interrupted but continued operating through the Russian Invasion of Ukraine 2022. The system carried 100,500 daily riders as of 2020.

== History ==
=== Pre-Soviet Revolution ===
The idea of developing a tram line in Zaporizhzhia was first put forward in 1898. A proposal for the construction of an electric tram line was submitted to the Zemstvo Assembly from the Aleksandriv City Duma. According to the project of the Odesa businessman Brodsky, the line was supposed to run from the city through the Schoenwiese colony to the station of the Kursk-Kharkiv-Sevastopol railway. The idea was received positively, but the matter did not reach construction Later, attempts to arrange a tram in Aleksandriv were also accepted by the mayor Felix Movchanovsky. On September 29–30, 1913, Aleksandriv was visited by Belgian engineers. They considered Mr. Niebuhr's project to connect the city with the Aleksandriv Sanatorium by electric tram. The city administration considered this issue, but historical events stood in the way of further material development. With the beginning of the construction of the Dnieper Hydroelectric Station, the issue of transportation for the city's residents arose, because of the town's rapid growth. In 1929, the population of Zaporizhzhia and Pavlo-Kickas (then the name of the settlement on the Right Bank of the Dnieper) numbered 82,500 people.

=== Pre-War Times ===
In the summer of 1931, work began on the construction of the Dniprobud— Zaporizhzhia tram line. At the time of the launch of the first phase of the tram connection, about 70,000 m³ of earthworks were carried out, up to 26,000 m³ of ballast was removed, three bridges with iron trusses were built and 18 km of tracks were laid. On 17 July 1932, at 05:00 in the morning, the first carriages started regular flights between the old city (from Volya Square) and the Dnieper Hydroelectric Station. In October of the same year, the line was extended to the South Station. In 1932, the tram carried more than 4 million passengers. 1933 witnessed the rapid growth of the tram network with lines opening in May, to the wharf and in June with a line connecting the Southern Highway to the Zaporizhstal office.

Rapid growth continued between 1934 and 1939. In 1934, 3 new lines were opened. The first in May, when a line was opened along Zhukovsky and Zhovtneva streets to the Baranov Plant. In September, the line over the Dnieper Hydroelectric Station dam to the Right Bank was opened. The trams at this time had steering wheels at the back and front, the driver changed positions at the terminuses. Trams ran every hour from 06:00 to 01:00. In November, the line to RMZ (Repair and Mechanical Plant) was opened.

Between 1936 and 1940 additional lines and extensions were added. In 1936, a line was laid from the RMZ to the Fireclay Plant. In 1937, the line was extended to the Dnipro Titanium and Magnesium Plant. In 1939, tram traffic was opened along Diagonal Street from the Southern Highway to the Ferroalloy Plant. In 1940, a line was built to Zeleny Yar.

=== German-Soviet War Era ===
In November 1941, work on the restoration of tram traffic began. Work continued on the restoration of damaged tracks and contact network. However, the lack of electricity became an obstacle to recovery.

=== Restoration in the Post-War Years ===
During the year following the liberation of the city from the German troops, work continued on the restoration of the tram system. In the months following the war, 35 km of track and contact network were rebuilt, a traction substation was put into operation, and 10 wagons were repaired. 10 wagons each were received from Kyiv and Kharkiv. In October 1944, the launch of the first line took place with trams operating on two routes.

Before the opening of the second phase, the "Tramtrust" team rebuilt two bridges (over the Kapustyan Beam and at the bridge crossing), consisting of more than 16 km of track. The restoration of the tram connection with the Sixth settlement took place in December 1944 with trams again running from the Zaporozhye I Station to the Dnieper Hydroelectric Station.

Between 1945 and 1946, traffic on almost all pre-war lines was restored. Only traffic through the Dnieper Hydroelectric Station dam to the Right Bank had not been restored. In April 1948, a rally was held in Zaporizhzhia, during which the director of the Leningrad Wagon Repair Plant No. 2, as a gift, handed over tram cars from the workers of Leningrad.

The 1950s and 1960s were a time marked by additional line openings. They consisted of the following:

1954 — the line to the fireclay plant was opened

1955 — the line to Pavlo-Kickas was opened

1956 — the line to the Dnipro titanium-magnesium plant was opened

1958 — a new line connecting the Southern Highway and Zeleny Yar, as well as a line to the meat processing plant, was opened

1961 — tram depot No. 2 was opened in the village of Pavlo-Kickas

1964 — a line was laid along Main Street

In 1965, the first Tatra T3 wagon was received from Kyiv, and in 1966, a batch of 30 such wagons arrived from the ČKD plant. For the next 20 years, the city received only Tatra T3 wagons. By the end of the 1980s, they had replaced all the oldest wagons. As of 1966, 14 routes operated in the city.

=== 1980s to 2000s ===
In 1988, the Zaporizhia Tram and Trolleybus Administration (ZTTU) received a batch of 20 new-generation Tatra T6B5 cars with a thyristor-impulse control system.

On August 20, 1993, around 4:00 p.m., on Gorky Street (now Poshtova Street) near Volya Square, a Tatra T6B5 tram derailed and collided with an oncoming tram. Tram driver Tetyana Volkova was killed, and 22 passengers received various injuries.

In 2000, the Zaporizhia Executive Committee headed by the newly elected mayor Oleksandr Polyak initiated the liquidation of the tram line on Lenin Avenue (Soborny) on the section from Lermontov Street to the river port. This decision was opposed by labor groups, public organizations, residents of the city, and the body of deputies. In March 2001, the city council voted by two-thirds against the mayor's efforts. However, a year later, on 25 September 2002, the Zaporizhia City Council of the next convocation decided to stop tram traffic.

In 2003, a single-track turning circle was built on Zavodska Street near Zaporizhia Tsyrka. The network reaches its maximum development, having a length of 110.2 km with 13 active routes.

In March 2004, the reconstruction of Lenin (Soborny) Avenue began in the section from Shevchenko Boulevard to Metallurgiv Avenue, so tram traffic from Lermontova Street in the direction of the river port was stopped. With the closure of the tram line, routes No. 1 and 17 were redirected to the Zaporizhia Circle ring. Also in 2004, route No. 2 — to the Youth Sports Palace, and routes No. 4 and 7 we closed. Operation of routes No. 6 and 11 was resumed, and route No. 10A "Meat processing plant - Maidan Voli - ZaporizhCircle" was opened. By June 2004, routes No. 10A and 17 were canceled. The closures coincided with population decline in Zaporizhia caused by out-migration and natural causes. The proliferation of private automobiles, various municipal financial issues and the growth of informal forms of transport caused ridership and demand to decline.

In April 2005, the tram crossing at the intersection of Lermontova Street and Soborny Avenue was reconstructed, with the track being paved with cast iron tiles. Later, using similar technology, a crossing was arranged across Soborny Avenue near Volya Square.

In July 2005, in connection with the construction of the "Amstor" supermarket, tram traffic was closed along Lermontova Street from Pravda Street to the Youth Sports Palace. Tram routes No. 2, 5 and 6 were shortened to the Zaporizhia Circle Ring. A supermarket parking lot has been built on the site of the tram ring. During March — April 2008, the line was finally dismantled. In 2008, modern tram cars were purchased for the system.

=== Modern History ===
In August 2012, tram depot No. 2 was renovated. After the conservation of the depot, routes No. 5 and 6 were closed. During July to October 2012, the tram track on Lenina Avenue was reconstructed in the section from Metalist Square to Transport Square. Between October and December 2012, at the expense of the owner of the Aurora Shopping Center, a 300 m long tram line was reconstructed on Gorky Street between Gryaznova Street and Komunarivska Street.

In 2012, at the initiative of People's Deputy of Ukraine Vyacheslav Boguslaev, cooperation between the enterprises "Motor Sich" and "Zaporizhelektrotrans" began. In 2015, 5 trams were repaired for a total of 2,259,000 ₴ with the funds of the international charity fund Dnipro-Sich. In general, during the years 2012–2015, the Dnipro-Sich Bank provided 6,458,000 ₴ of financial support for major repairs of Tatra T6B5 trams. Ongoing repairs to the system, namely track crossings were done in 2015 and 2016.

Since 2016, Vyshyvanka become a branding of the Zaporizhzhia Tram and municipal buses. Zaporizhzhia trams were the only ones in Ukraine that are decorated with an "embroidered" ornament. The design of the corporate brand was developed by the specialists of KP "Zaporizhelectrotrans". Corporate embroidered ornament on red electric transport. In July 2018, the first 3 of 12 Tatra KT4 D trams, which were previously operated in Berlin, arrived in Zaporizhzhia.

In February 2021, Zaporizhia Electrotrans, based on the results of open tenders, concluded a contract with LLC TD LITAN on the purchase of 12 Tatra KT4D tram cars for the amount of 38,156,400 ₴. In March 2021, the first stage of transport digitization of public transport was completed in Zaporizhzhia. All trams have additional terminals for contactless fare payment. In the future plans to install passenger sensors and introduce modern travel cards.

Service continued on the tram system despite the Russian invasion of Ukraine (2022–present) and extensive attacks on Zaporizhia. Targeted strikes on Ukraine's infrastructure caused the city to reduce tram service in an attempt to conserve electricity. On 23 February 2023, electric transport was fully restored in Zaporizhzhia, which had been operating in a reduced mode since 16 November 2022. Due to those attacks there are currently on 6 tram lines operating as compared to 7 before the war.

== Routes ==
| No. | Starting Point | Terminus | Route |
|---|---|---|---|
| 3 | Zaporizhzhia-1 Railway Station | Zaporozhye-Live | |
| 10 | Maidan Voli | Meat Processing Plant | |
| 12 | Maidan Voli | Zaporozhye-Live | |
| 14 | M18 Highway | Zaporizhzhia State Circus | |
| 15 | Maidan Voli | Shevchenkivskyi Microdistrict | |
| 16 | Zaporizhzhia-1 Railway Station | Pavlo-Kickas | |

== Tram Depots ==
Tram Depot No. 1

- Opened in 1932 .
- Address: Shkilna Street

Tram Depot No. 2

- Opened in 1961, renovated in August 2012
- Address: Liza Chaikina Street

== Energy Management ==
30 traction substations provide power for the contact network of tram and trolleybus lines of KP Zaporizhelektrotrans.

In 2017, 4 substations were equipped with traction network monitoring and protection systems.

== Fares ==
From 1 May 2021, the fare on trams is 6.00 ₴. The fare is paid to the driver upon entering the tram. The purchased ticket from the driver must be stamped with a composter, but the ticket is valid only in the tram where it was purchased. All municipal trams are equipped with contactless fare payment validators as of 2021.

== Rolling Stock ==
| Photo | Model | Producer | Quantity as of 3 January 2021 | Stock | Start of Operation | Board Numbers |
|---|---|---|---|---|---|---|
| | T3UA-3-ZP | Zaporizhzhya Electrotrans | 14 | 14 | 2017 | 363, 369, 383, 388, 550, 562, 576, 716, 768, 773, 774, 783, 797, 806 |
| | Tatra T6B5 | ČKD | 39 | 53 | 1988 | 416—453, 455—458 |
| | K1 | Tatra-Yug | 1 | 1 | 2008 | 001 |
| | Tatra T6B5 | Tatra-Yug | 9 | 9 | 1988 | 454,459-466 |
| | Tatra T3 | ČKD | 61 | 351 | 1965 | 204—415, 550, 551, 552, 559–562, 576, 688–739, 742—809 |
| | Tatra KT4DtM | ČKD | 6 | 6 | 2018 | 002—007 |
| | Tatra KT4DtM | ČKD | 10 | 10 | 2018 | 008—017 |

== Gallery ==
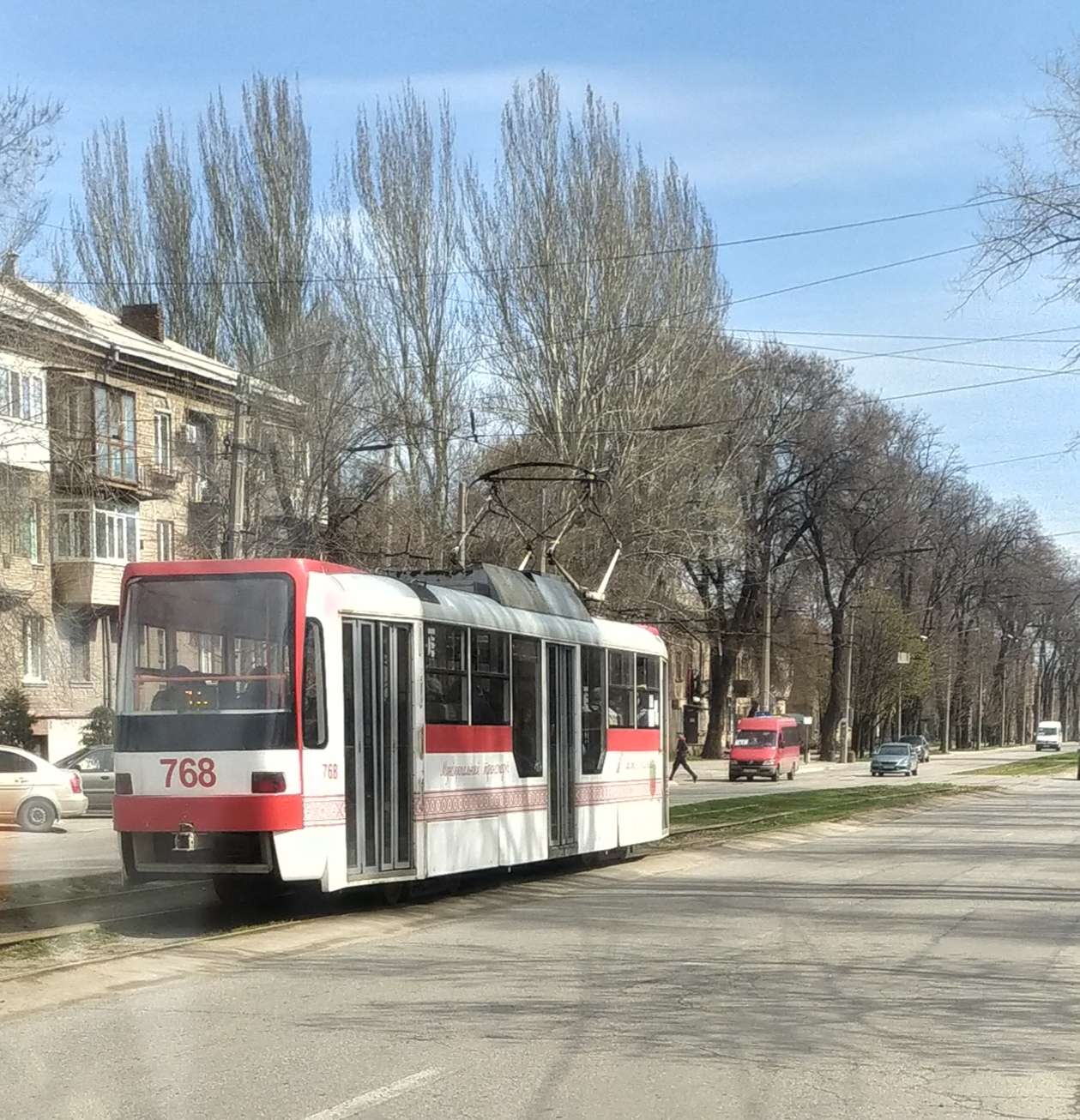
T-3UA-3-ZP tram in operation

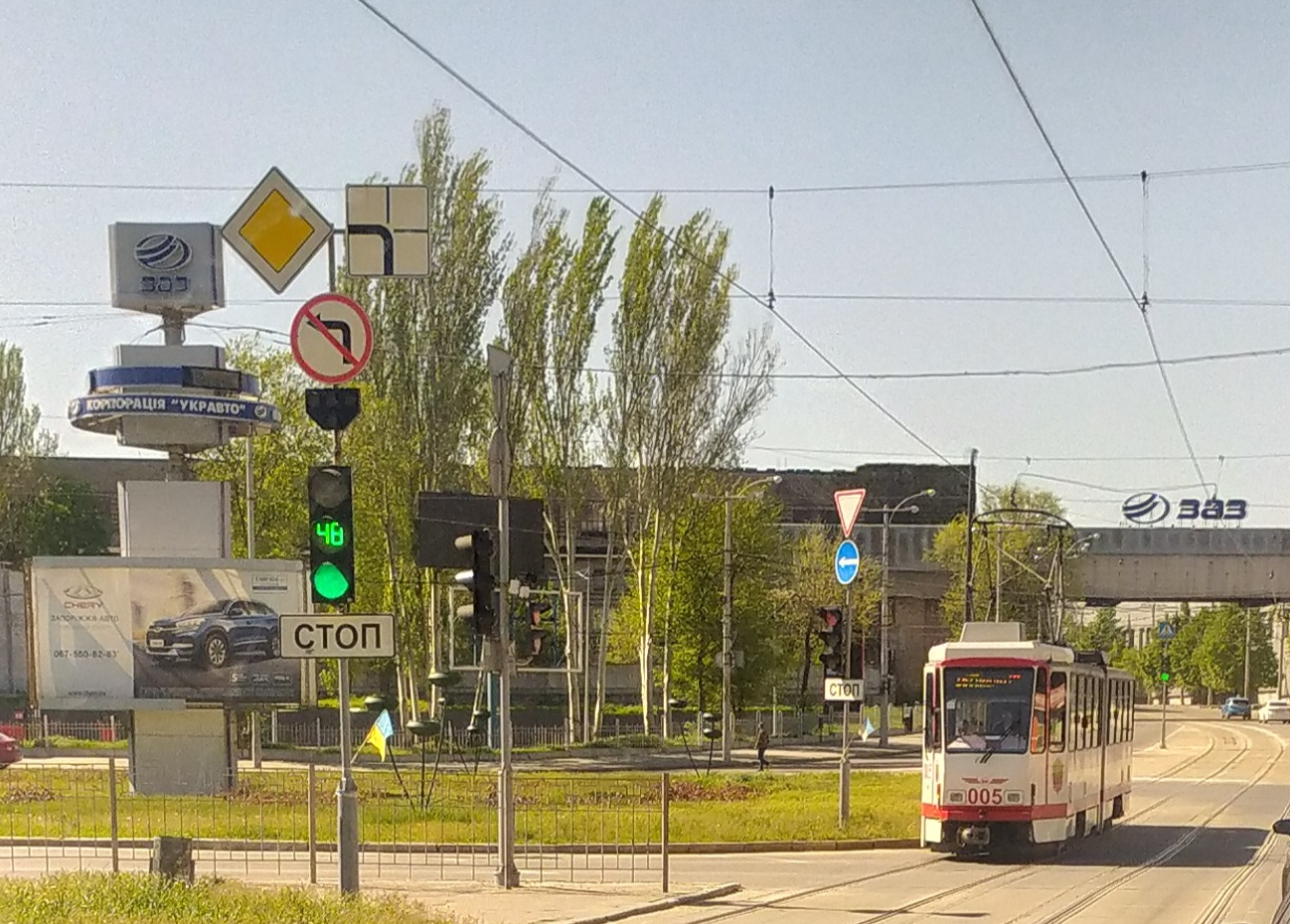
Tatra KT4DM in operation

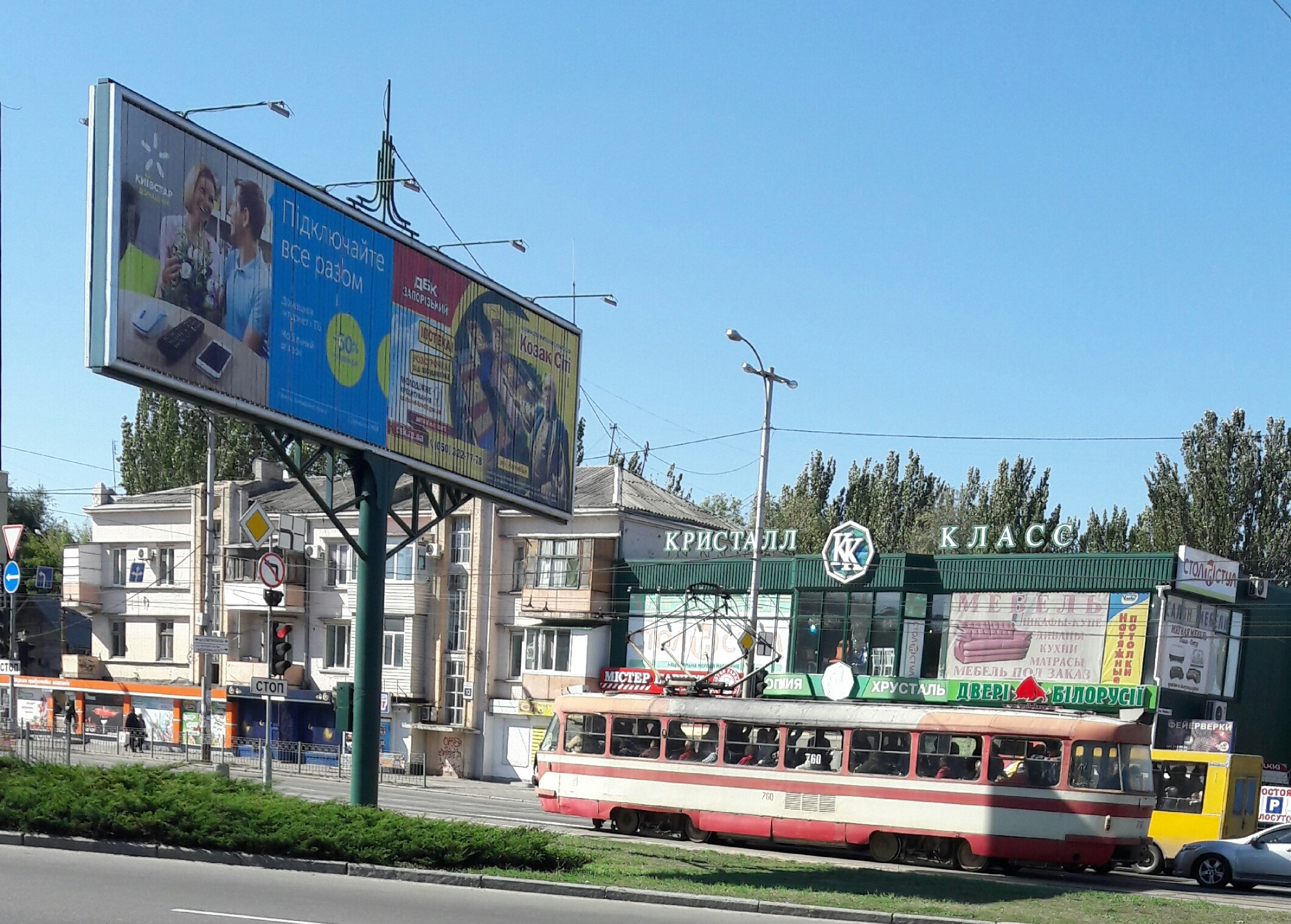
Tatra T3SU in operation

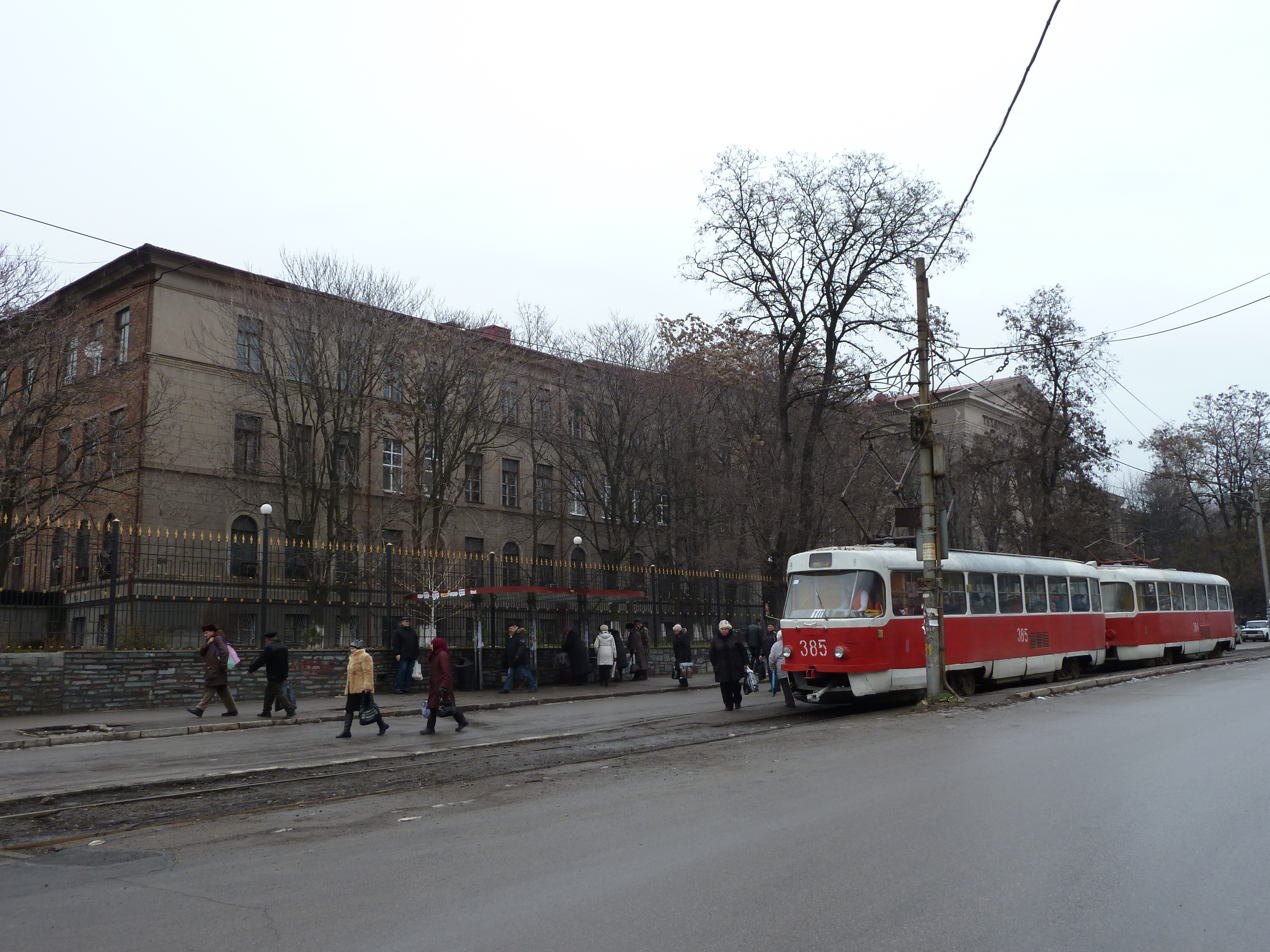
A tram on Zhukovsky Street
