= Trams in Dnipro =

Tram system in Dnipro, Ukraine

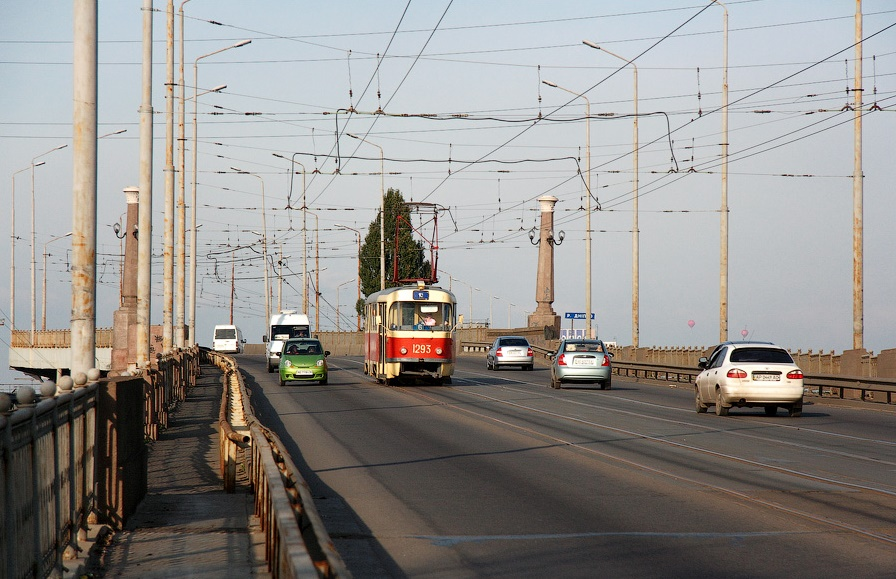

Operation
- Locale: Dnipro, Ukraine
- Open: 1897
- Lines: 14

Infrastructure
- Track gauge: 1524 mm
- Depot: 2 (+1 technical)
- Stock: Tatra T3, Tatra T3D, Tatra T4D, Tatra T6B5, KTM-5, KTM-8

Statistics
Overview
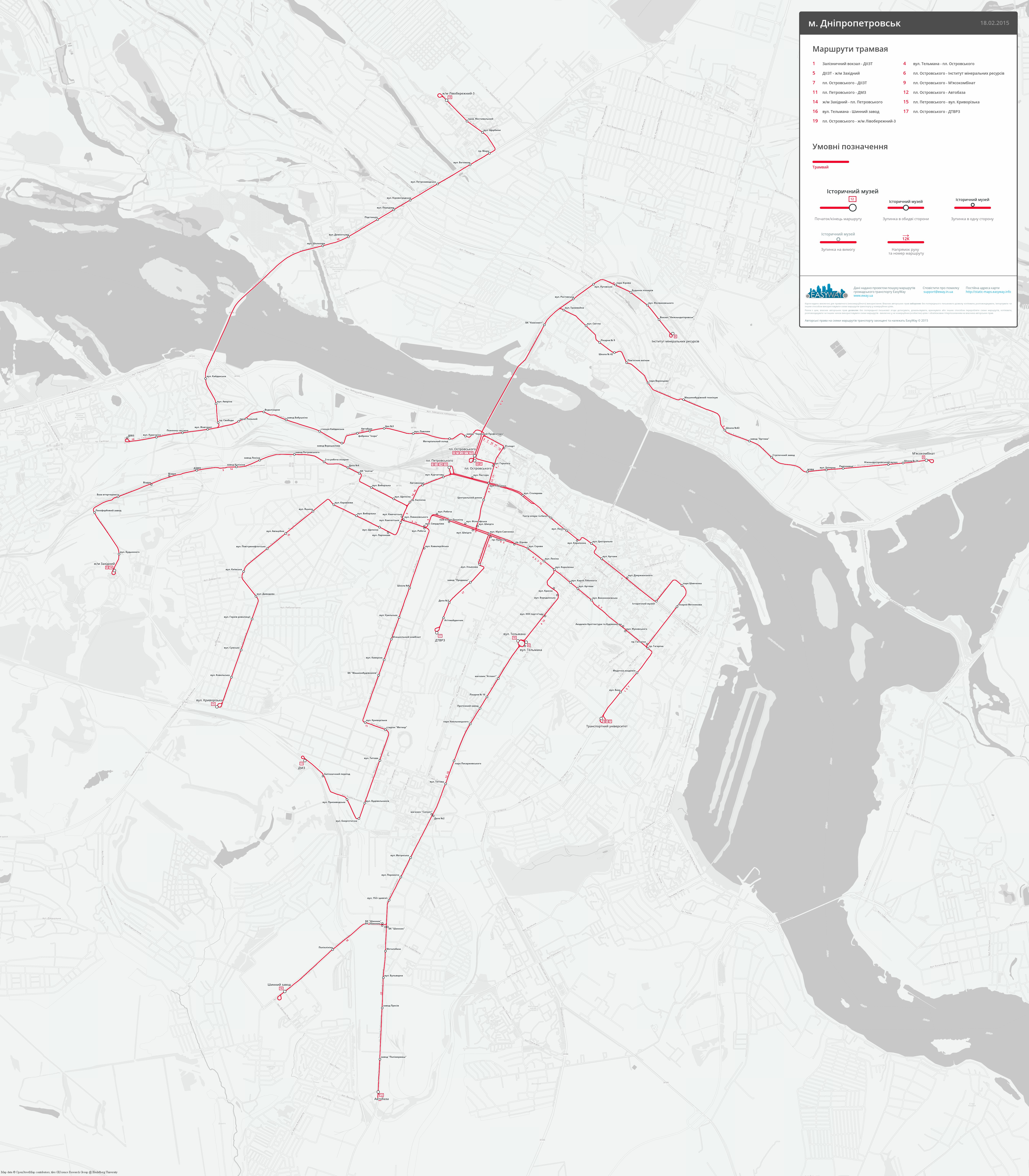

Dnipro tram is a system of electric trams including 14 tram routes (with 163 stops) within the city of Dnipro, Ukraine. It has been operating since 1897.

== History ==
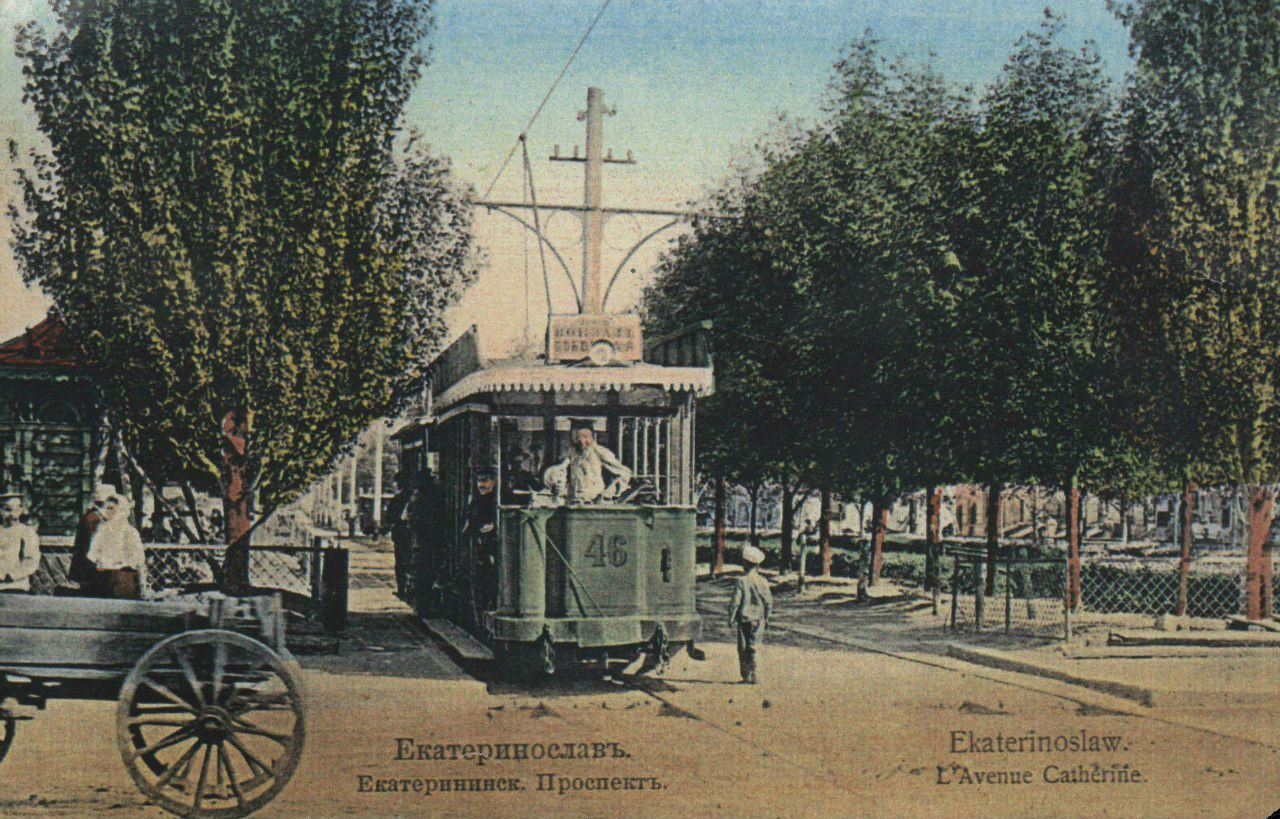
Early 20th century. The Belgian tram in Catherine the Great ave.

Queuing for a tram in Central Dnipropetrovsk. December 2005

The Yekaterinoslav tram opened on 27 June 1897 (according to the modern Gregorian calendar and 14 June according to the Julian calendar). At the time of opening, it was the third tram system operating in the Russian Empire (its predecessors were the Kyiv Tram and Nizhny Novgorod Tram). It was constructed and operated by the Belgian company Tramways électriques d'Ekaterinoslaw. By the end of 1897, two million people had been transported. The initial tram system was based on a 1,000 mm (3 ft 3 3/8 in) metre gauge and included three tram lines starting from Catherine the Great Avenue (now Dmytro Yavornytskyi Avenue). The routes were:

- Steamboat hithe – Proviant str. (Paster Street) – Catherine the Great ave. (Dmytro Yavornytskyi ave.);
- Jordan str (Kotsyubynskyi str.) – Karaimska str (Shyrshov str);
- Catherine the Great ave. (Dmytro Yavornytskyi ave.) – Alexander str (Sichovykh striltsiv str) – Big Market str.

On 21 April 1906, an alternative tram network was opened in Yekaterinoslav. It was also based on 1,000 mm (3 ft 3 3/8 in) metre gauge. In 1918, the operating companies and tram networks merged. In 1931, the tram depot included 177 trams, and the network length reached 65 km (40 mi). On 6 November 1932, the tracks were converted from narrow gauge to Russian gauge. The conversion was completed by 1948.

In the years between 1970 and 1990, the rolling stock was changed for cars from ČKD Tatra. Later, the tramcars were also produced on the premises of Pivdenmash. By 1996, the rolling stock included about 400 trams, and the overall ridership was 115 million passengers per year. By that time 19 tram lines existed.

== Rolling stock ==
As of 1 January 2014, the rolling stock consists of 33 maintenance carriages and 275 passenger carriages, including the following types: 71-605 – 9 carriages, 71-608K – 5, 71-608 km – 23, Tatra T3D – 26, Tatra T3SU – 122, Tatra T6B5 – 12, Tatra T4D – 48, Tatra T6A2M – 30.

In August 2021, the Dnipropetrovsk Regional State Administration announced a tender in the Prozorro system for the purchase of three-section low-floor trams for the cities of Dnipro and Kryvyi Rih. In the same month, Ukraine and Switzerland signed a memorandum of understanding for Dnipro to receive 15 new Stadler Rail trams. In 2019 Dnipro's rolling stock was expanded with 20 used Tatra T4D trams from Leipzig, Germany.

=== Current ===
Picture	Manufacturer	Model	Quantity	Since
	(Russia) UKVZ	71-605	232	1975
	(Czech Republic) ČKD Tatra	T3SU (3 doors); T3DC; T4D-MT; T4D-M1	212; 14; 29; 75	1976; 2003; 2011; 2019
	(Russia) UKVZ	71-608K; 71-608KM	7; 24	1991; 1995
	(Czech Republic) ČKD Tatra (Ukraine) Tatra-Yug	T6B5	12	1995
	(Czech Republic) ČKD Tatra	T6A2M	30	2013
	(Czech Republic) ČKD Tatra	T6A5	1	2023
	(Ukraine) Tatra-Yug	K1T306	5	2026

=== Historical ===
Picture	Manufacturer	Model	Quantity	Years
	(Germany) MAN		54	1896–1932
	(Hungary) Ganz		12	1905–1932
	(Germany) MAN		33	1906–1932
	(Russia) MMZ		14	1910–1932
	(Russia) UKVZ (Ukraine) MSZ (Russia) MMZ (Ukraine) KZET	Kh; 2M	99; 22	1926–1968
	(Russia) UKVZ	KTM-1	60	1949–1971
	(Latvia) RVR (Ukraine) KZET	MTV-82; KTV-59	27; 1	1953–1979; 1962–1970
	(Germany) Gotha	T57; T2	15; 11	1959–1970; 1962–1970
	(Czech Republic) ČKD Tatra	T2SU	1	1961–1964
	(Russia) UKVZ	KTM-2	143	1963–1985
	(Czech Republic) ČKD Tatra	T3SU (2 doors)	226	1968–2014
	(Russia) UKVZ	KTM-5M Ural	20	1970–1985
