= Tatra-Yug K1T =

Ukrainian tram vehicle

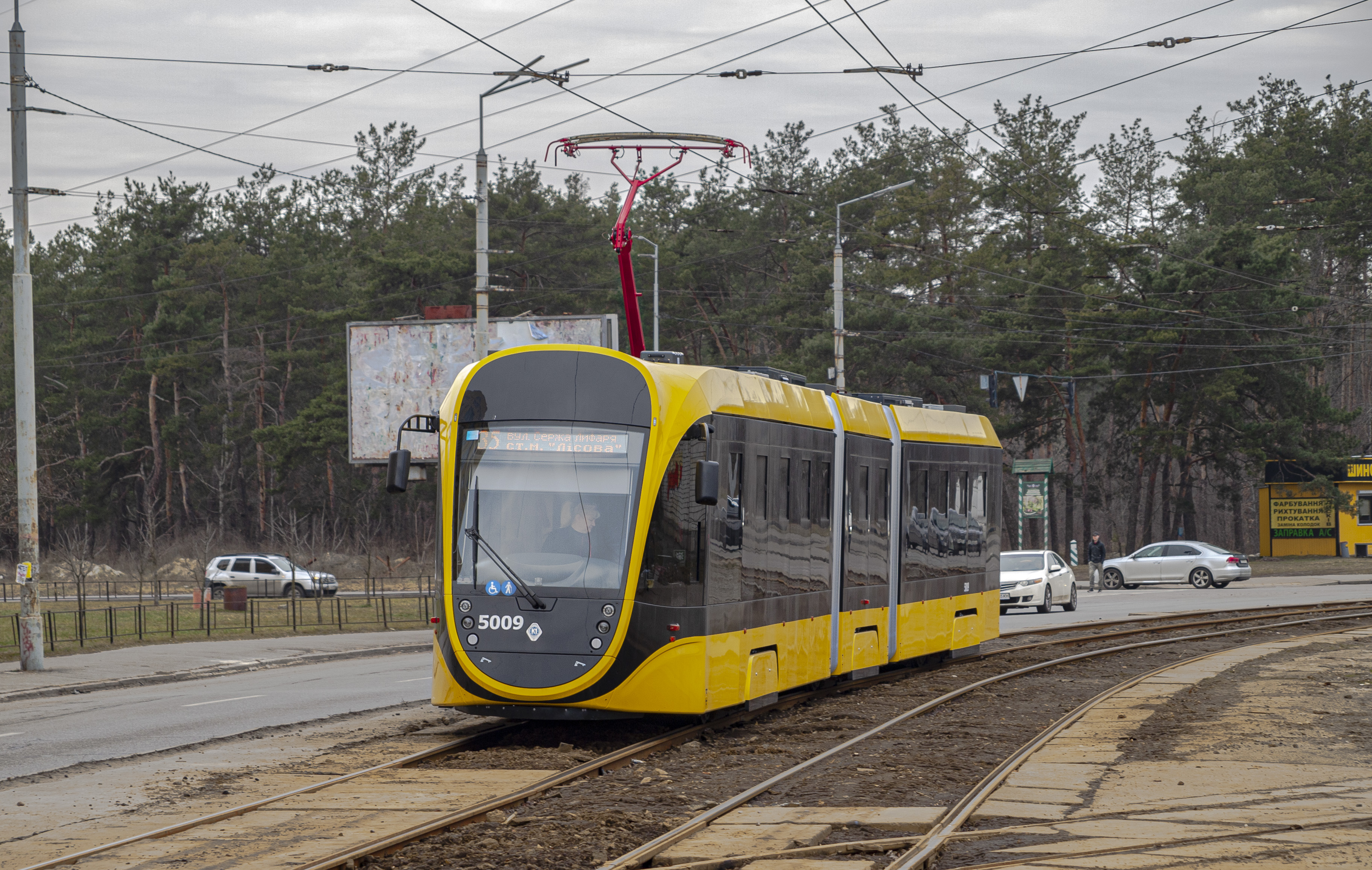
- Tatra-Yug K1T in Kyiv

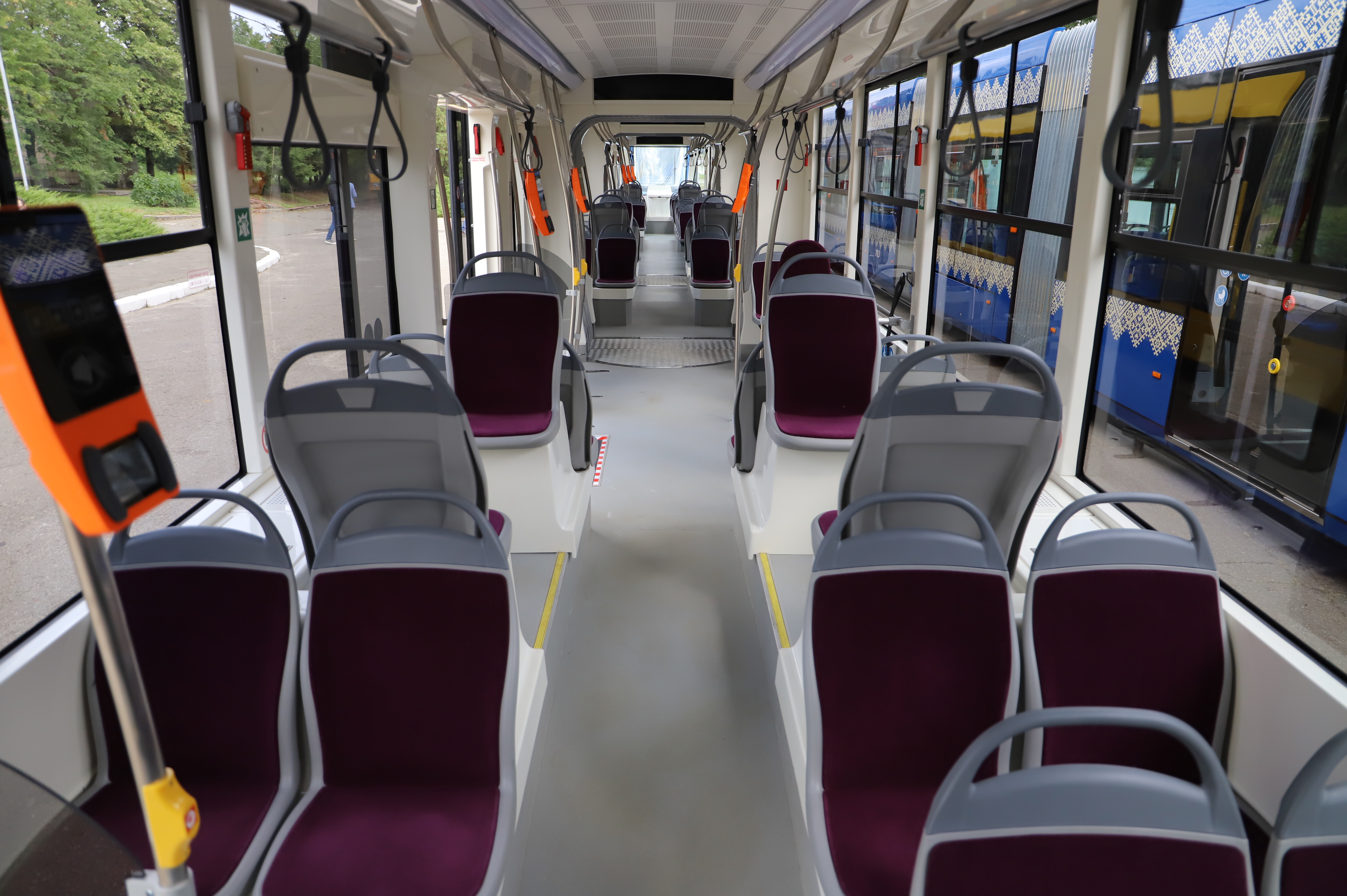
- Interior of Kyiv's Tatra-Yug K1T
- Manufacturer: Tatra-Yug
- Assembly: Pivdenmash
- Family name: Tatra-Yug K1T
- Number built: 46
- Predecessor: Tatra-Yug K1

Tatra-Yug K1T is a Ukrainian low-floor tram family designed by Tatra-Yug and built at Pivdenmash aerospace factory in Dnipro. K1T is Tatra-Yug's first model that isn't based on any product of ČKD, subsidiary of which the company originally was.

== History ==
In 2018, after Kyiv was dissatisfied with recently delivered K1M6 tram, Tatra-Yug began to work on its successor. The tram was planned to be 100% low-floor, therefore no longer based on licensed Tatra T6B5 like its predecessors. The tram was designed modular and had wide doors opened by operator and narrow doors opened by passengers via buttons next to them. The concept of the tram was presented at InnoTrans 2018 in Berlin. In Ukraine, the concept was presented at 5T international investment forum in Odesa on October 2019.

In 2020, while the first unit of K1T306 has been on the final stage of assembly, Tatra-Yug won three tenders on tram supply, two in Ukraine (Kyiv and Odesa) and one in Romania (Craiova). However, the last one was later rerun and eventually won by Polish Pesa.

In January 2021 the first unit was finished. Before being delivered to Kyiv it was tested on the line in Dnipro. The tram has been delivered to Kyiv's Darnytske depot in August and began its operation on the recently repaired DVRZ line in September. Before the end of 2021 Kyiv already received 3 out of 20 ordered units.

In 2022 the assembly at Pivdenmash was interrupted by Russia's full-scale invasion of Ukraine. Tatra-Yug managed to renew the production in the spring despite being located in the eastern part of the country that is closer to the frontlines. The company supplied Kyiv with seven trams in 2022 and eight trams in 2023, completing the order. In 2023-2025 Tatra-Yug assembled 13 trams for Odesa.

In 2024 Tatra-Yug had won the tender to supply five more K1T306 to Kyiv, next year they won another one supply another three. The tenders were run during the reconstruction of the Kyrylivska Street making it the first supply of this model to the right bank of the city. Also in 2025 Tatra-Yug was chosen to supply five trams to Dnipro, the homecity of the company.

In November-December 2025 first trams arrived in Kyiv. In February 2026 first K1T306 trams were received by Dnipro. In March eight trams were delivered to Kyiv.

== Modifications ==
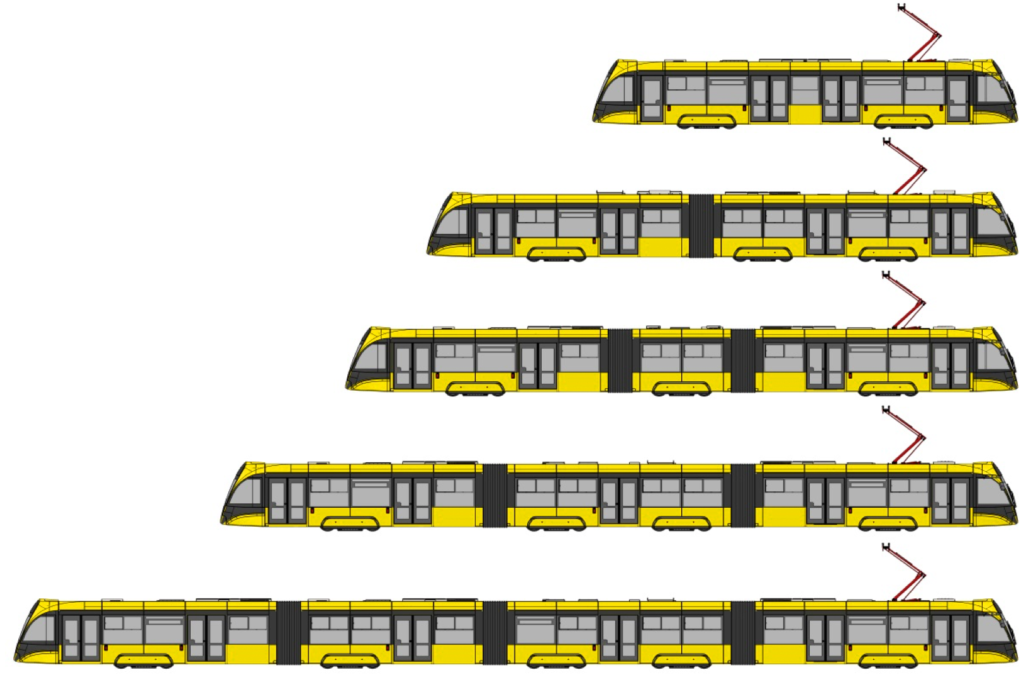
Illustration of possible Tatra-Yug K1T configurations

- Tatra-Yug K1T104 – 17 meters long, 1 section, 4 axis
- Tatra-Yug K1T204 – 18 meters long, 2 sections, 4 axis
- Tatra-Yug K1T206 – 23 meters long, 2 sections, 6 axis
- Tatra-Yug K1T306 – 26 meters long, 3 sections, 6 axis
- Tatra-Yug K1T308 – 31 meters long, 3 sections, 8 axis
- Tatra-Yug K1T410 – 36 meters long, 4 sections, 10 axis

== Production ==
| Country | City | Type | Delivery years | Number | Fleet numbers |
|---|---|---|---|---|---|
| Ukraine | Dnipro | K1T306 | 2026 | 5 | 3401–3405 |
| Ukraine | Kyiv | K1T306 | 2021–2026 | 28 | 5001–5028 |
| Ukraine | Odesa | K1T306 | 2023–2025 | 13 | 7013–7025 |
| Total: | | | | 46 | |

Note: This is the list of first owners. Stock may have later been resold to other cities, not on this list.

== Gallery ==
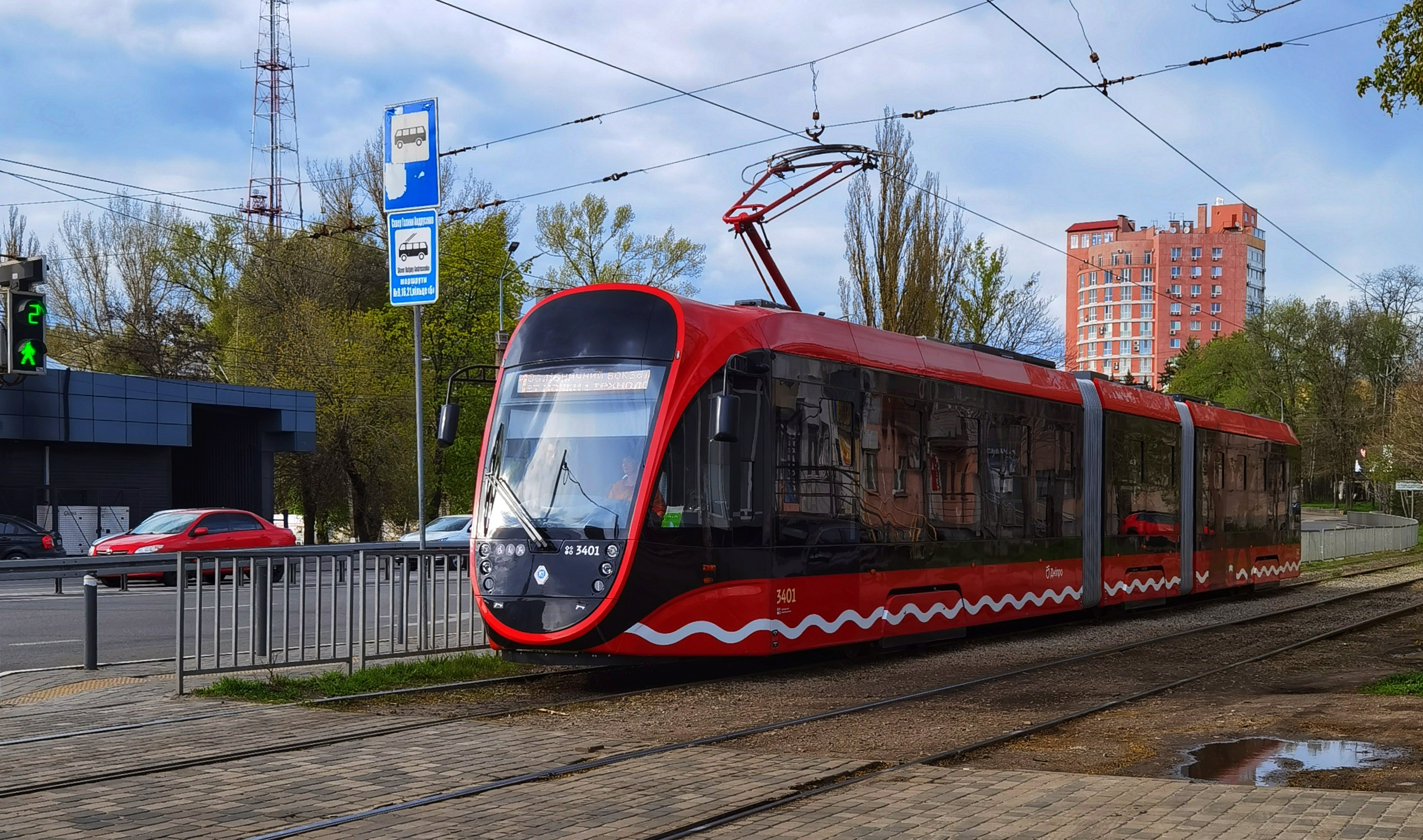
Tatra-Yug K1T306 in Dnipro
