= Kh (tramcar) =

Class of double axled high-floor tramcars

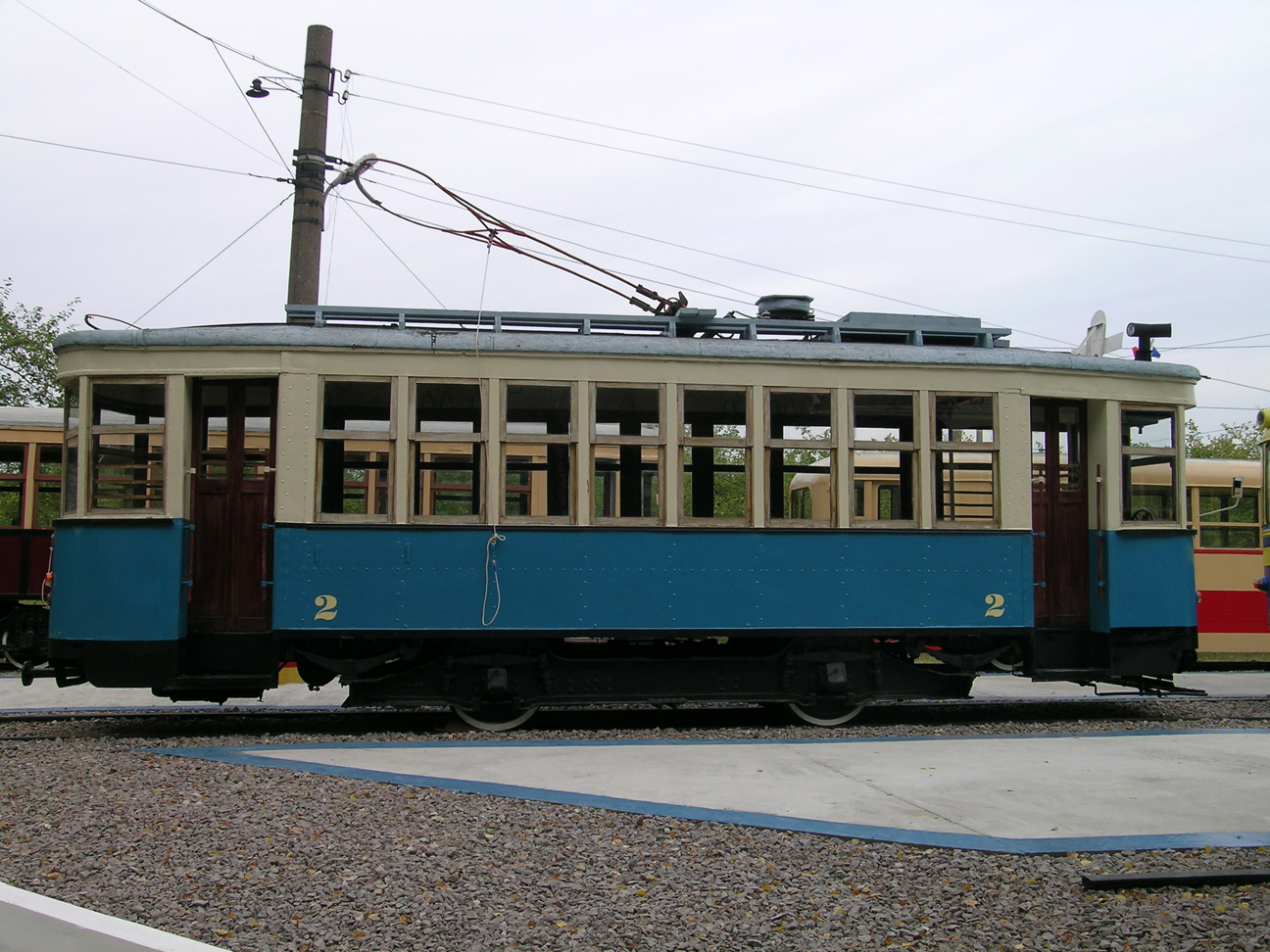
- Museum Kh tramcar in Nizhniy Novgorod, Russia
- Manufacturer: (Soviet Union) UKVZ
- Constructed: 1928—1941
- Number built: more than 2000
- Capacity: 24 or 16 seats

Specifications
- Train length: 10,270 mm (33 ft 8 in)
- Width: 2,464 mm (8 ft 1.0 in)
- Height: 3,274 mm (10 ft 8.9 in)
- Doors: 2
- Maximum speed: 40 km/h (24.9 mph)
- Bogies: 2
- Track gauge: 1,000 mm (3 ft 3 3/8 in); 1,435 mm (4 ft 8 1/2 in); 1,524 mm (5 ft)

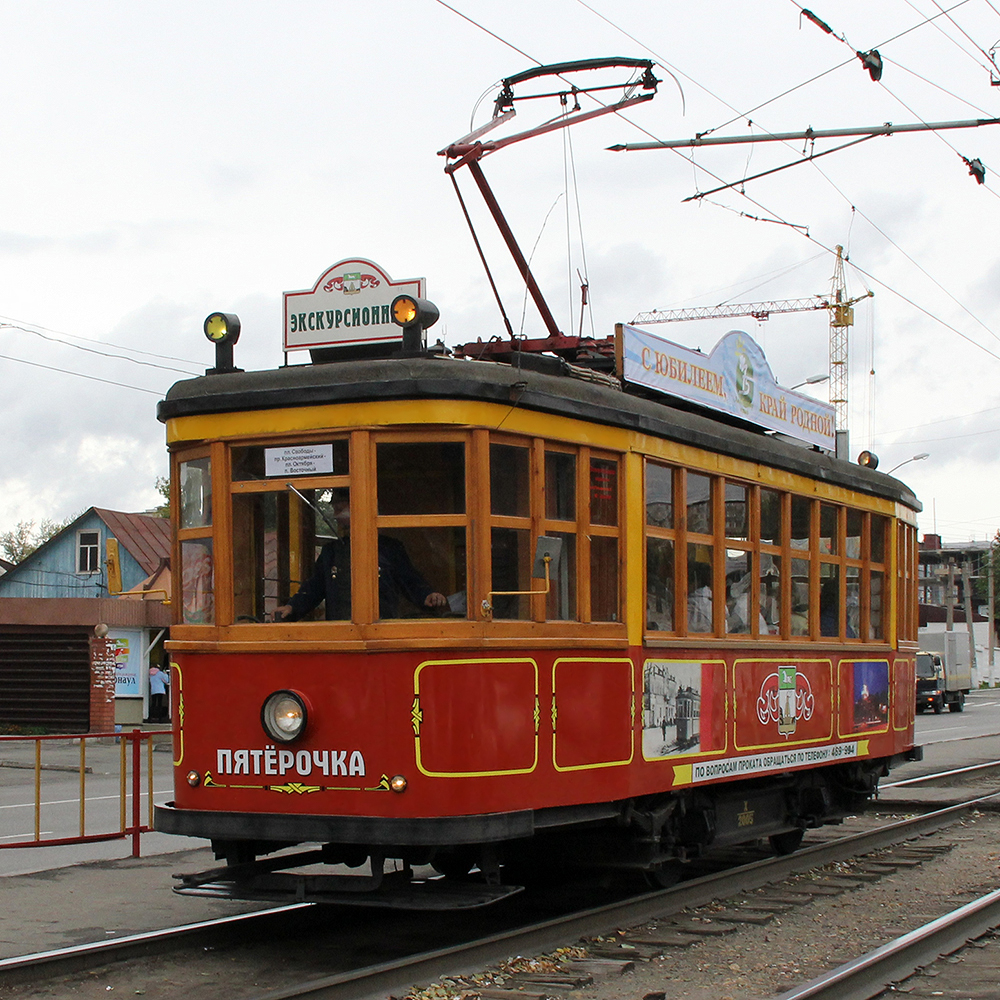
Kh in Barnaul.

Kh (Russian: Х) was the class of double axled high-floor tramcars, which were built in Soviet Union in interbellum period. First vehicles were built in 1927 and delivered to Kharkov, Ukraine. First letter of city name, Cyrillic Х (usually transliterated as Kh), was selected as a designation of whole series. After Kharkiv, tramcars of this type were supplied to many Soviet cities and became most numerous in the fleets of many municipalities. In 1941, after the onset of Operation Barbarossa, their production was stopped for maximizing war efforts. The Kh-class tramcars were finally withdrawn from the city service in the mid-1960s as they had become operationally obsolete; their sturdy construction would have allowed them to be used much longer, but tram systems preferred more modern, better riding, newer trams. A small number of surviving cars are preserved for museum purposes in Moscow, Nizhniy Novgorod, Saratov and a few other cities.

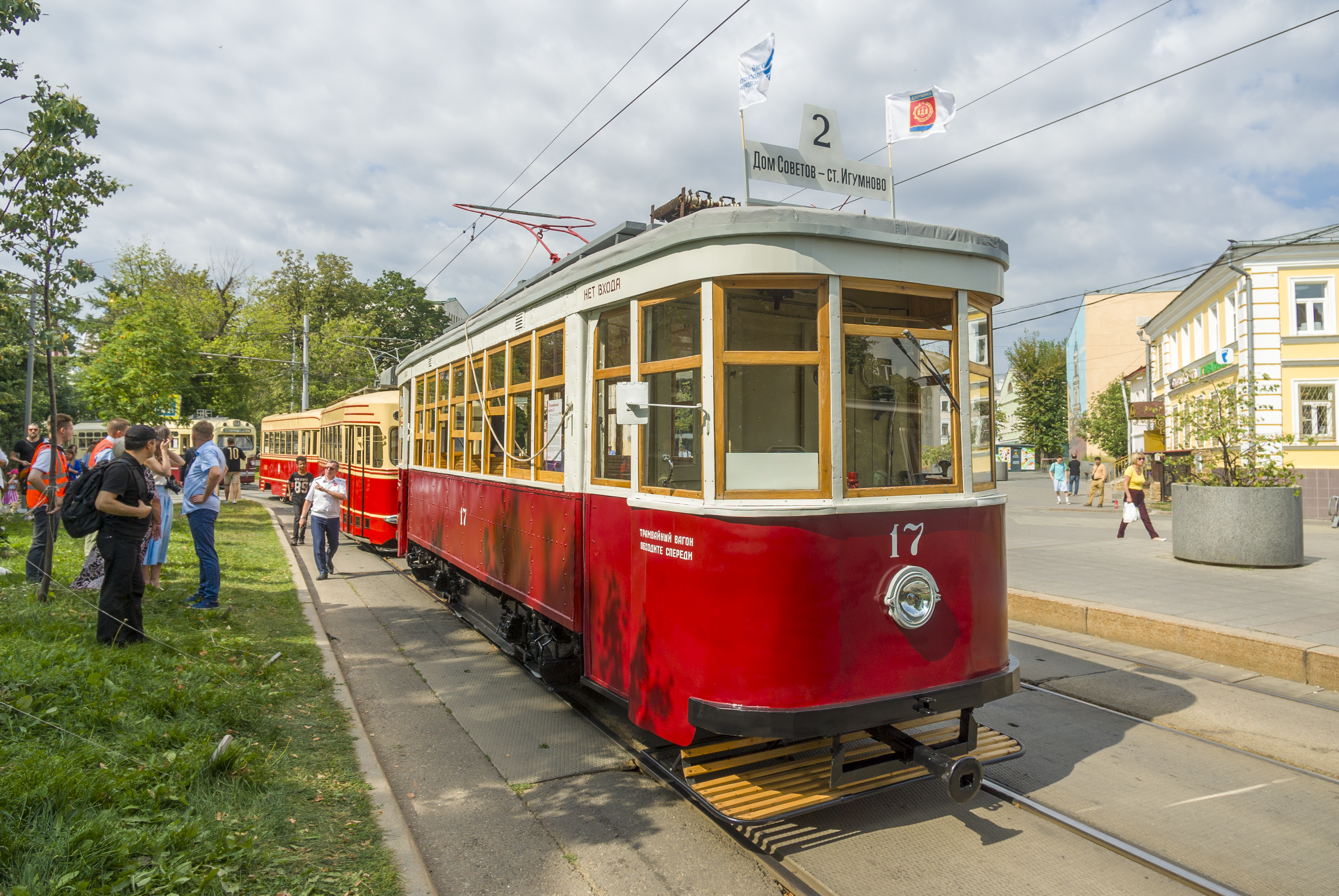
Preserved Dzherzinsk Kh 17 tram at parade in Moscow (2024)
