= Tatra-Yug K1 =

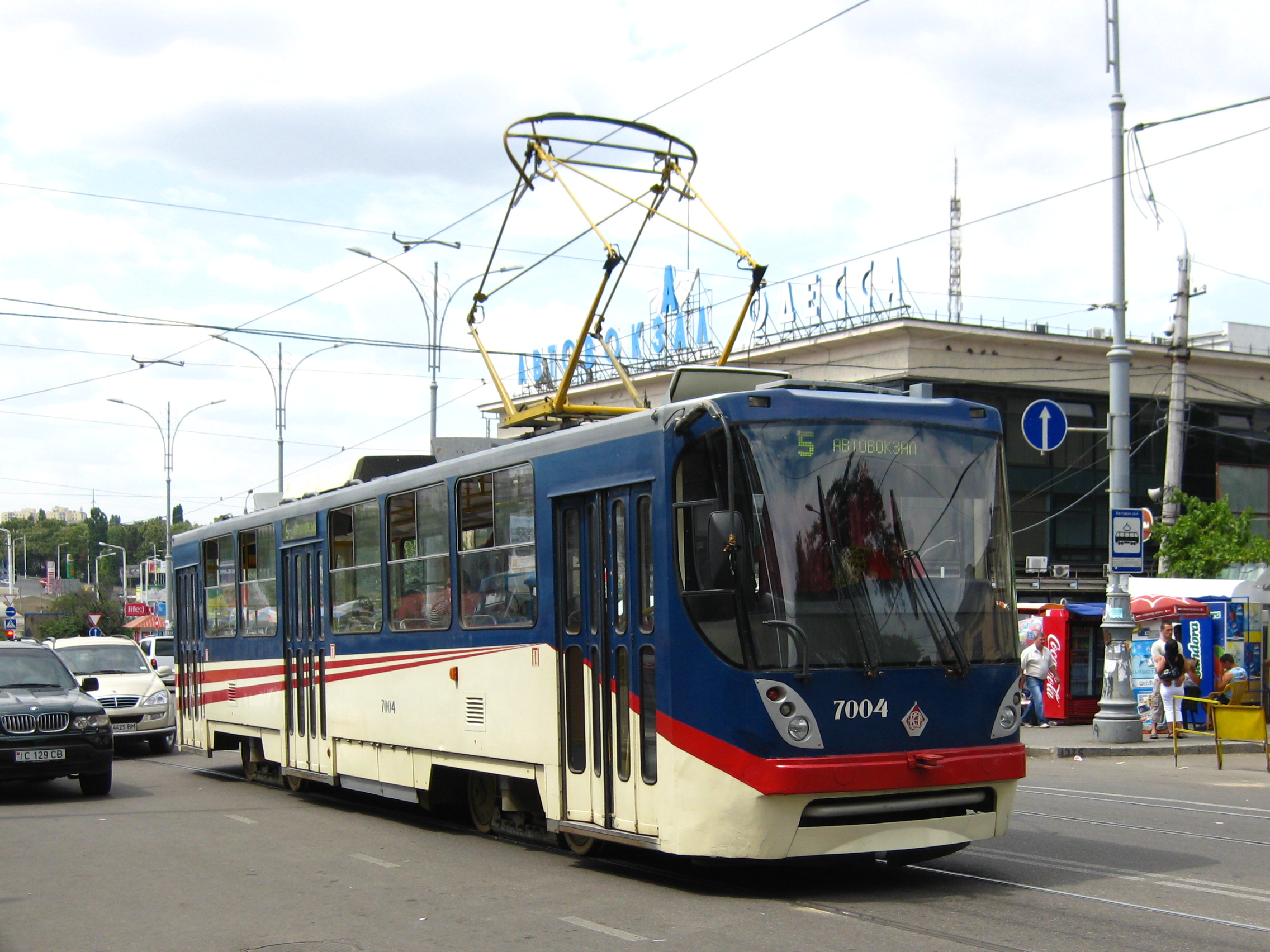
- Tatra-Yug K1 in Odesa
- Manufacturer: Tatra-Yug
- Assembly: Pivdenmash
- Family name: Tatra-Yug K1
- Constructed: K1: 2001–2013; K1M8: 2004–2012; K1M: 2012–2016, 2026; K1M6: 2017; K1E6: 2018–2020
- Number built: 89
- Predecessor: Tatra T6B5
- Successor: Tatra-Yug K1T

Specifications
- Car length: 15,620 mm (51 ft 3 in) (K1); 15,638 mm (51 ft 3 5/8 in) (K1M); 26,800 mm (87 ft 11 1/8 in) (K1M6); 30,638 mm (100 ft 6 1/4 in) (K1M8)
- Width: 2,500 mm (8 ft 2 3/8 in) (K1, K1M8, K1M6); 2,480 mm (8 ft 1 5/8 in) (K1M)
- Height: 3,145 mm (10 ft 3 7/8 in) (K1, K1M, K1M8); 3,500 mm (11 ft 5 3/4 in) (K1M6)
- Doors: 3 (K1, K1M); 4 (K1M6); 5 (K1M8)
- Wheel diameter: 700 mm (2 ft 3 1/2 in)
- Maximum speed: 65 km/h (40 mph) (K1, K1M6); 75 km/h (47 mph) (K1M, K1M8)
- Weight: 18,600 kg (41,000 lb) (K1); 19,600 kg (43,200 lb) (K1M); 37,580 kg (82,850 lb) (K1M8)
- Current collection: pantograph
- Bogies: 2 (K1, K1M); 3 (K1M6); 4 (K1M8)
- Coupling system: Scharfenberg

Tatra-Yug K1 is a Ukrainian tram family based on the Czechoslovak designed Tatra T6B5. The trams were designed by the former Ukrainian branch of ČKD, now known as Tatra-Yug at the Pivdenmash aerospace factory in Dnipro, Ukraine.

== Types ==
=== K1 ===
The development of the Tatra T6B5 modernization for Kyiv (hence the letter 'K' in the name) started in the late 90's, with the first prototype assembled in 2001 and sent to the capital for testing. In 2003 Tatra-Yug assembled two K1 trams with T6B5 bodies, which were sent to Donetsk. In 2004 the first K1 was returned to factory, the same year Tatra-Yug began the serial production of the facelifted K1.

In 2003–2008 Tatra-Yug supplied Donetsk with 25 K1 trams, the largest number in any city. In 2004 5 units were received by Luhansk, where they ran until the tram network closed in 2016. In 2006 the K1 got a new control system. In 2006–2008 10 units were built for Odesa and 7 units for Mariupol, with another 7 units sold to Mykolaiv, but one of them was returned to the factory. In 2007 the K1 received new doors and seats, while the original K1 prototype was modernized to match the production models and was sent to Konotop. In 2007–2008 Kryvyi Rih received 7 units and in 2008 Zaporizhzhia received one unit. In 2010–2011 Kyiv received 9 more units and the final K1 was built in 2013 for Dniprodzerzhynsk (now Kamianske). Additionally in 2015 Mariupol received one K1 that was assembled for Kyiv in 2012 but was never delivered.

=== K1M8 ===
In 2004 Tatra-Yug developed a three-section tram, which was similar to another ČKD model, Tatra KT8D5. In 2006 the first two units were tested in Dnipropetrovsk (now Dnipro). In 2010–2012 Kyiv received four K1M8 cars, including the original two. Originally it was planned to modernize Kyiv's old Tatra T6B5 model trams into K1M8 at KZET (Kyiv Electric Transport Plant) the same way some Tatra T3s had been modernized into model T3UA, however it was never done and most of Kyiv's T6B5 were scrapped.

=== K1M ===
In 2012 Tatra-Yug assembled the first semi-low-floor version of K1. Kyiv received 8 units in 2012–2015, Odesa got one in 2015 and the final unit was sent to Mariupol in 2016.

Between late 2010's and early 2020's Tatra-Yug updated K1M's design that first appeared in company's brochures. The first city to order the upgraded K1M was Kamianske in 2026.

=== K1T2/K1T3 ===
K1T2 was planned as a longer version of the K1M8, however Tatra-Yug never built a single unit, so it remains an unrealized project. The longest modification of the K1 was supposed to be a five-section K1T3, but as with the K1T2 none were built.

=== K1M6 ===
The development of a new modification of the K1 began in 2015, Tatra-Yug hosted a competition for the exterior design and chose the winner in 2016. July 1 the tram was introduced in Odesa. The single unit that was built in 2017 was tested in Kamianske before being bought by Kyiv in 2018.

=== K1E6 ===
In 2018 Tatra-Yug took an order of Egyptian city of Alexandria to develop a narrow gauge version of the K1. The trams consist of two sections, and are equipped with a pantograph on one end and a trolley pole on the other end. Between 2018 and 2020, Tatra-Yug built 15 of these trams for Egypt.

== Production ==
Country	City	Type	Delivery years	Number	Fleet numbers
Egypt	Alexandria	K1E6	2018–2020	15	701–715
Ukraine	Donetsk	K1	2003–2008	25	3007–3034
Ukraine	Kamianske	K1	2013	1	2014
Ukraine	Kamianske	K1M	2026	1	2028
Ukraine	Konotop	K1	2007	1	102
Ukraine	Kryvyi Rih	K1	2007–2008	7	479–485
Ukraine	Kyiv	K1	2010–2011	9	479–485
Ukraine	Kyiv	K1M8	2010–2012	4	500–503
Ukraine	Kyiv	K1M	2012, 2015	8	341–343, 351–355
Ukraine	Kyiv	K1M6	2018	1	511
Ukraine	Luhansk	K1	2004	5	301–305
Ukraine	Mariupol	K1	2006–2008	7	301–307
Ukraine	Mariupol	K1M	2016	1	308
Ukraine	Mykolaiv	K1	2006–2008	7	1107–1108, 2003–2007
Ukraine	Odesa	K1	2006, 2008	10	7002–7011
Ukraine	Odesa	K1M	2015	1	7012
Ukraine	Zaporizhzhia	K1	2008	1	001
Total:				89	

Note: This is the list of first owners. Stock may have later been resold to other cities, not on this list.

== Gallery ==
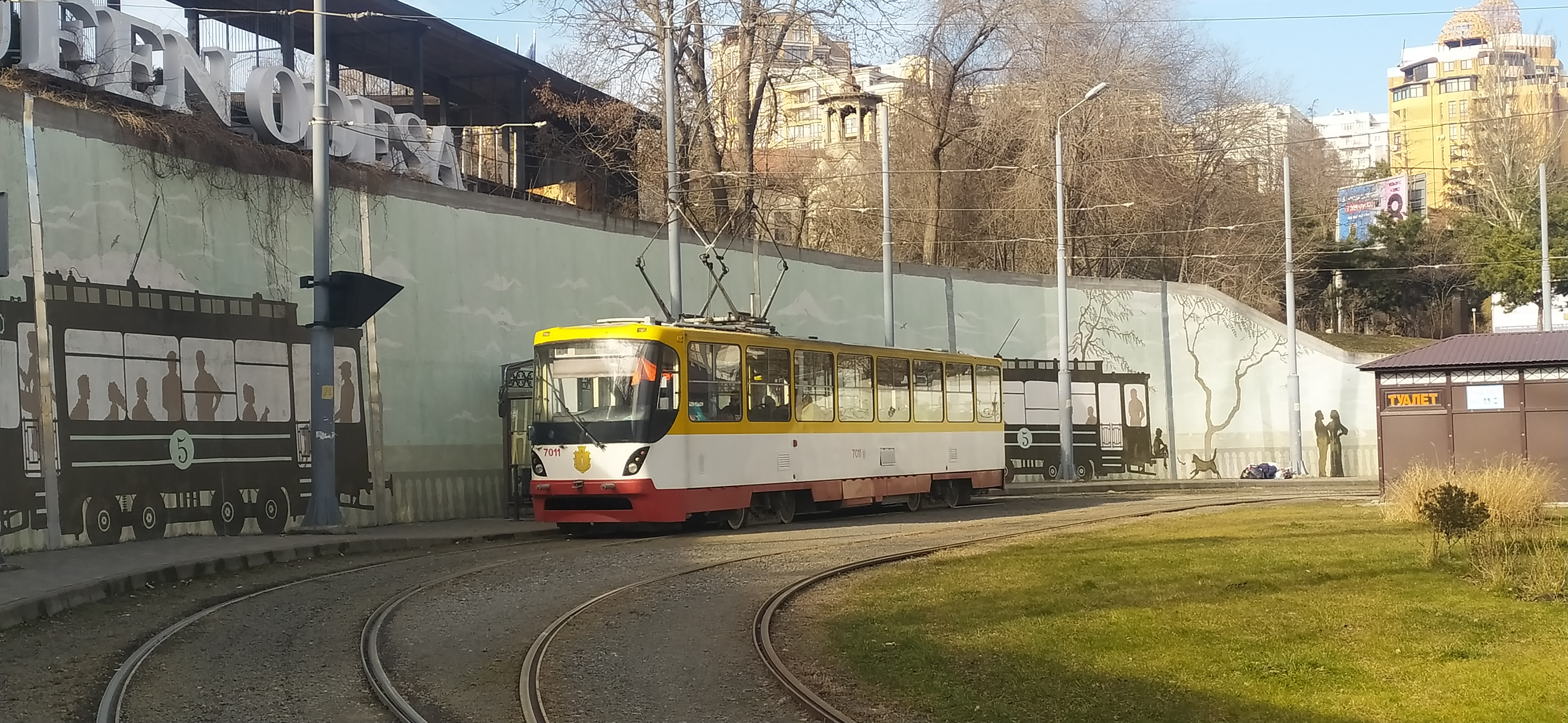
Tatra-Yug K1 in Odesa

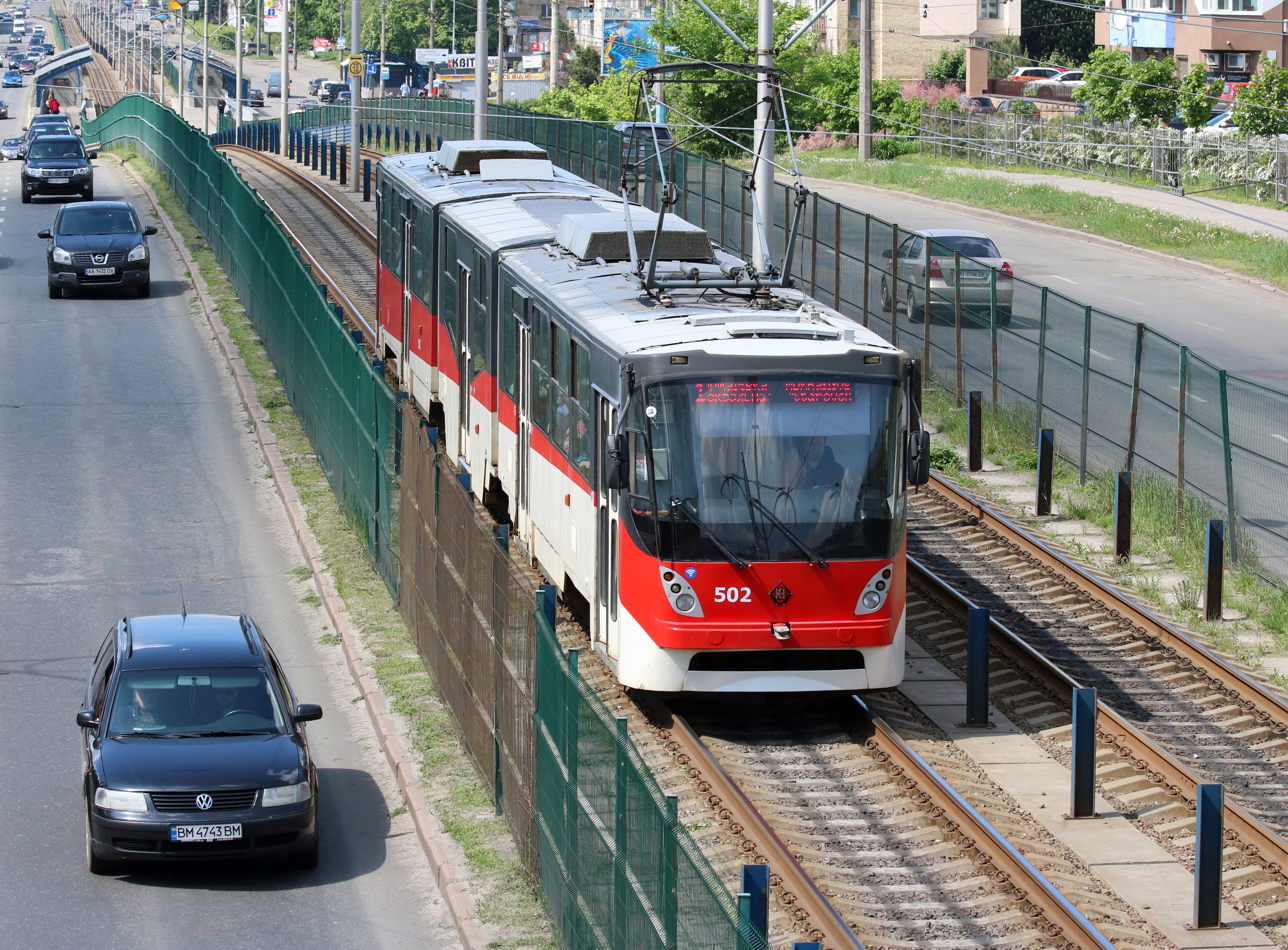
Tatra-Yug K1M8 in Kyiv

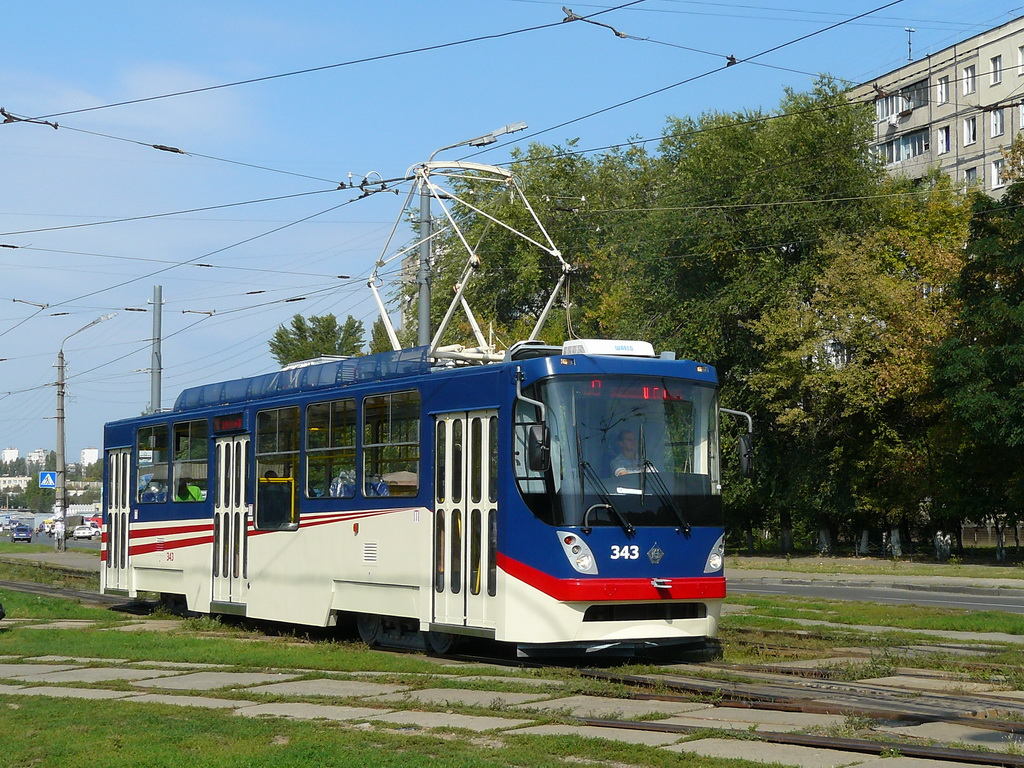
Tatra-Yug K1M in Kyiv

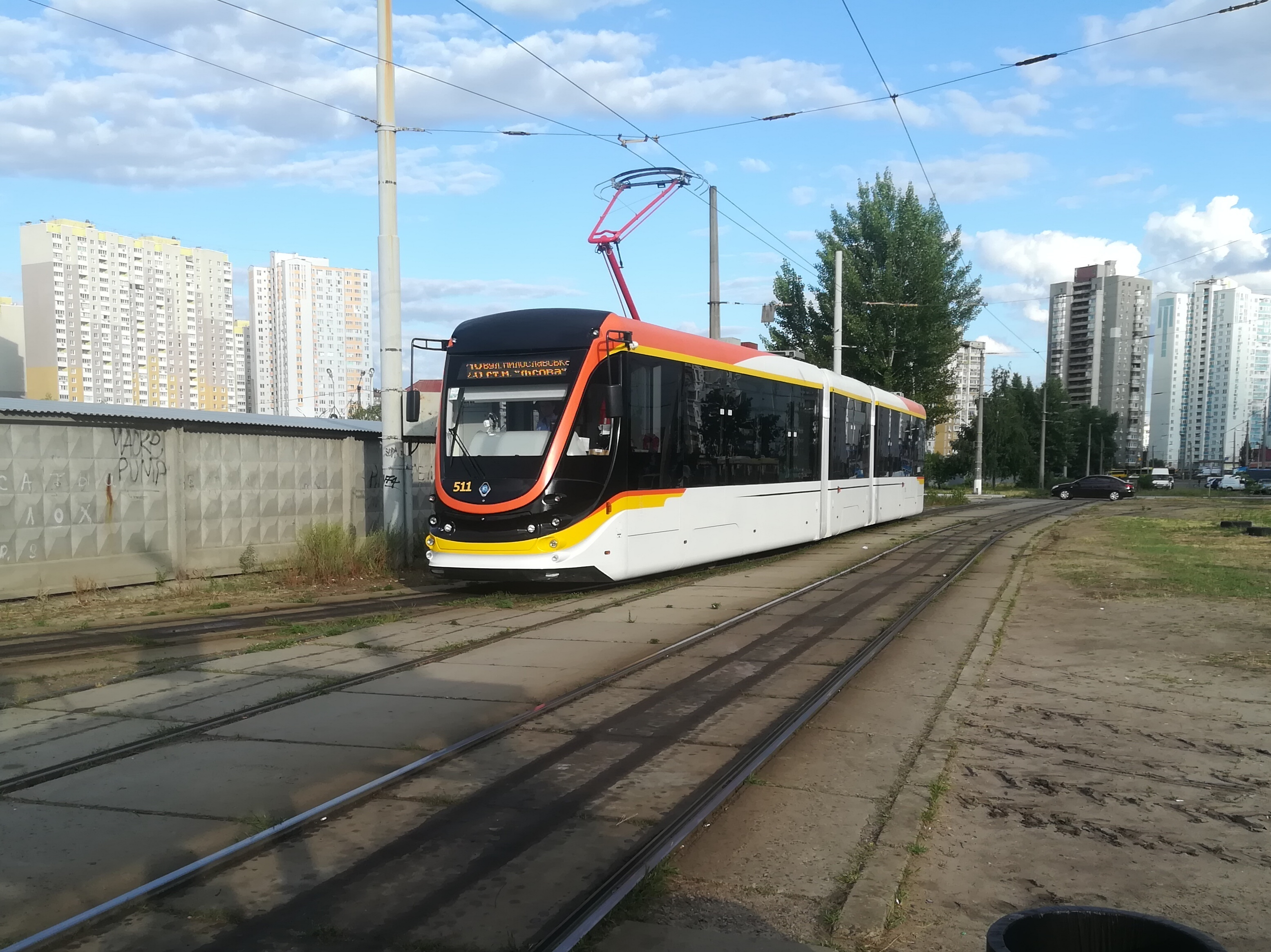
Tatra-Yug K1M6 in Kyiv

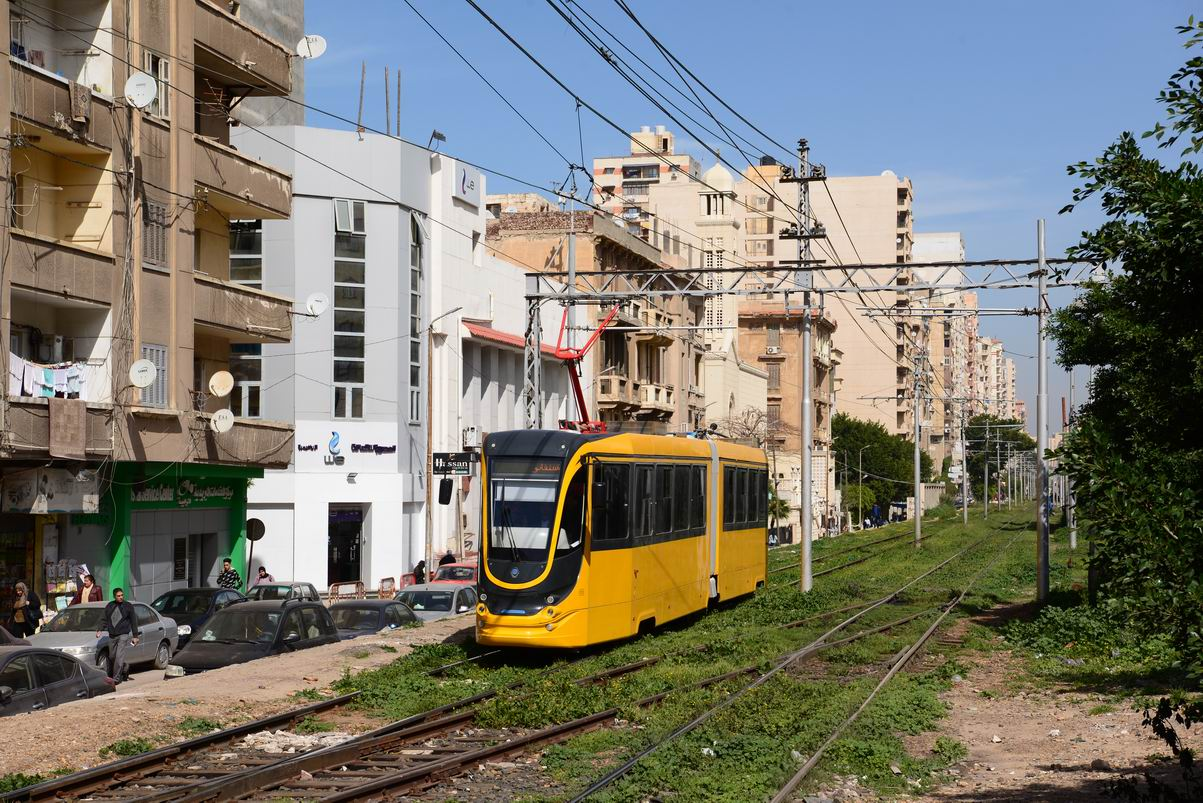
Tatra-Yug K1E6 in Alexandria
