= Tatra T6B5 =

Electrical tram used in former Warsaw Pact countries

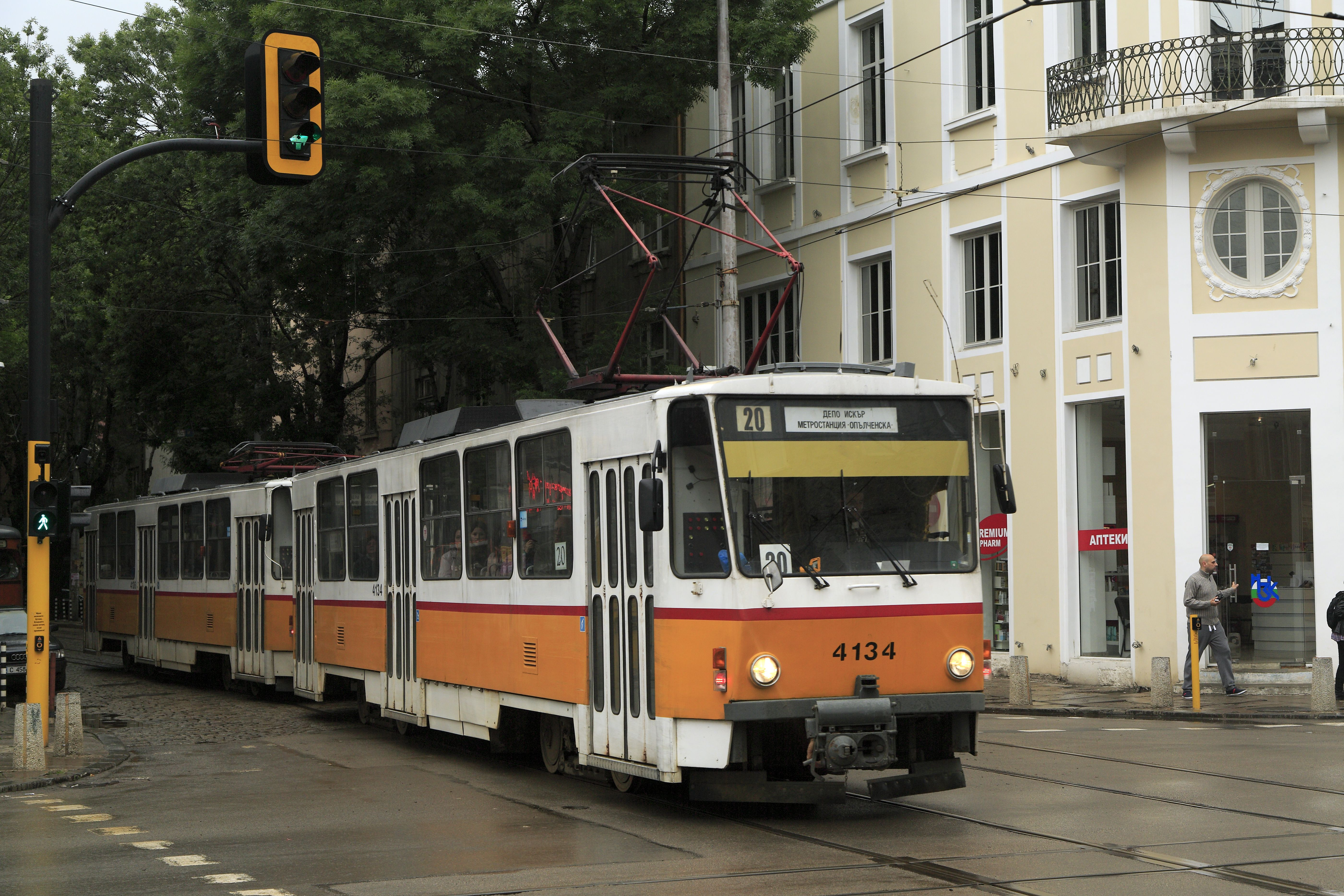
- Coupled Tatra T6B5 trams in Sofia
- Manufacturer: ČKD Tatra; Tatra-Yug
- Assembly: (Czech Republic) Prague (Ukraine) Dnipro
- Family name: Tatra
- Constructed: 1983–2007
- Number built: 1,279
- Predecessor: Tatra T3
- Successor: Tatra-Yug K1
- Capacity: 120

Specifications
- Car length: 15,300 mm (50 ft 2 in)
- Width: 2,500 mm (8 ft 2 in)
- Height: 3,145 mm (10 ft 3.8 in)
- Doors: 3
- Maximum speed: 65 km/h (40 mph)
- Weight: 18,000 kg (40,000 lb)
- Engine type: TE 023
- Traction motors: 4
- Power output: 4×45 kW
- Electric system(s): 600 V DC
- Current collection: pantograph
- Wheels driven: 4
- Bogies: 2
- Coupling system: Scharfenberg
- Track gauge: 1,435 mm (4 ft 8 1/2 in), 1,524 mm (5 ft)

Tatra T6B5 is a Czechoslovak-built high floor four axle tram with a pulse-width-modulation ('chopper') speed control. This model of tram was produced by CKD Praha in Smíchov, Prague in the period of 1983–1995, following one year in Zličín until 1996. After ČKD Praha went bankrupt, the final assembly and sale of incomplete trams were managed by Inekon Trams until 2007. The last four trams were supplied to the city of Ufa by late 2007. About 1,150 tramcars of this model were produced. In the former Soviet Union, it is also known as Tatra T3M. In 2015 most of these trams were used in Russia, Belarus, Ukraine, and Uzbekistan. (Note: In 1994-1996 being licensed Czech Manufacturers Dnipropetrovsk (now Dnipro) based plant, Pivdenmash (literally translated as "Southern Machinery Plant", because it is located in Dnipro, southern Ukraine) built 38 trams of this kind, designated as Tatra-Yug (Tatra-Yug is Russian for "Tatra-South", the index word "south" came from the fact that Dnepropetrovsk is located in the southern part of Ukraine). Then they produced 75 modified trams based on T6B5 model, which was designated as Tatra-Yug K1. Besides the countries of the former Soviet Union, T6B5 trams were also supplied to Bulgaria and North Korea.)

== Tram description ==
The T6B5 is notably distinct from the other sub-classes of the T6 series. Its most noticeable difference is its extra width, which causes the front end not to look as "pointed" as the other T6 types.

== General ==
T6B5, is a four-axle motorized single-ended tram. Tram cars can be used autonomously as well as in multiple units, controlled from a single console. It is possible to rise only one pantograph when such trams are driven in sets of two. Yet using three-car tram sets, two pantographs must be up. Controlling the second tram cars from a first is possible even if the traction equipment of a first car is out of order.

== Production ==
1,279 trams were produced and delivered to:

Country	City	Type	Delivery years	Number	Fleet numbers
Belarus	Minsk	T6B5SU	1990 – 1996	24	001–025
Bulgaria	Sofia	T6B5B	1989	37	4101–4137
North Korea	Pyongyang	T6B5K	1990 – 1992	142	1046–1174, 2001–2073, 3006-3049 (not all numbers used)
Latvia	Riga	T6B5SU	1988 – 1990	62	201–262
Russia	Barnaul	T6B5SU	1985 – 1989	106	1001–1032, 3001–3209
Russia	Izhevsk	T6B5SU	1987 – 1991	35	2001–2035
Russia	Izhevsk	T5B6-RA	2003	10	2036–2045
Russia	Yekaterinburg	T6B5SU	1987 – 1989	34	357–372, 730–747
Russia	Kursk	T6B5SU	1987 – 1995	78	009–086
Russia	Lipetsk	T6B5SU	1988 – 1989	45	2101–2145
Russia	Moscow	T6B5SU	1984	2	001–002
Russia	Nizhny Novgorod	T6B5SU	1988–1989	25	2901–2925
Russia	Novokuznetsk	T6B5SU	1989	15	215–228
Russia	Oryol	T6B5SU	1989 – 1990	14	086–099
Russia	Rostov-on-Don	T6B5SU	1988 – 1989	40	800–839
Russia	Samara	T6B5SU	1989 – 1993	48	853–867, 1003–1036
Russia	Tula	T6B5SU	1988 – 1996	77	13, 14, 17, 18, 23–30, 47, 48, 83, 84, 301-358
Russia	Tver	T5B6SU	1985 – 1988	35	1–35
Russia	Ufa	T5B6SU	1988	30	1101–1130
Russia	Ufa	T5B6-MPR	2007	4	2007–2009, 2031
Russia	Ulyanovsk	T6B5SU	1988 – 1990	45	2173–2217
Russia	Vladikavkaz	T6B5SU	1988	20	110–129
Russia	Volgograd	T6B5SU	1987 – 1989	20	2834–2853
Russia	Voronezh	T6B5SU	1989	12	105–116
Ukraine	Kharkiv	T6B5SU	1988 – 1990	55	4519–4573
Ukraine	Dnipro	T6B5SU	1996 – 2002	12	3001–3012
Ukraine	Donetsk	T6B5SU	2003	6	3001–3006
Ukraine	Kamyanske	T6B5SU	1996–2000	5	2000–2004
Ukraine	Kyiv	T6B5SU	1985 – 1994	97	001–077, 100, 101, 301–318
Ukraine	Kryvyi Rih	T6B5SU	1993	1	
Ukraine	Mykolaiv	T6B5SU	2000 – 2001	3	1915, 2001, 2002
Ukraine	Odesa	T6B5SU	1999	1	7001
Ukraine	Zaporizhia	T6B5SU	1988 – 1996	50	417–466
Uzbekistan	Tashkent	T6B5SU	1991 – 1999	100	2701–2757
Total:				1,279	

Note: This is the list of first owners. Stock may have later been resold to other cities not on this list.

== Gallery ==
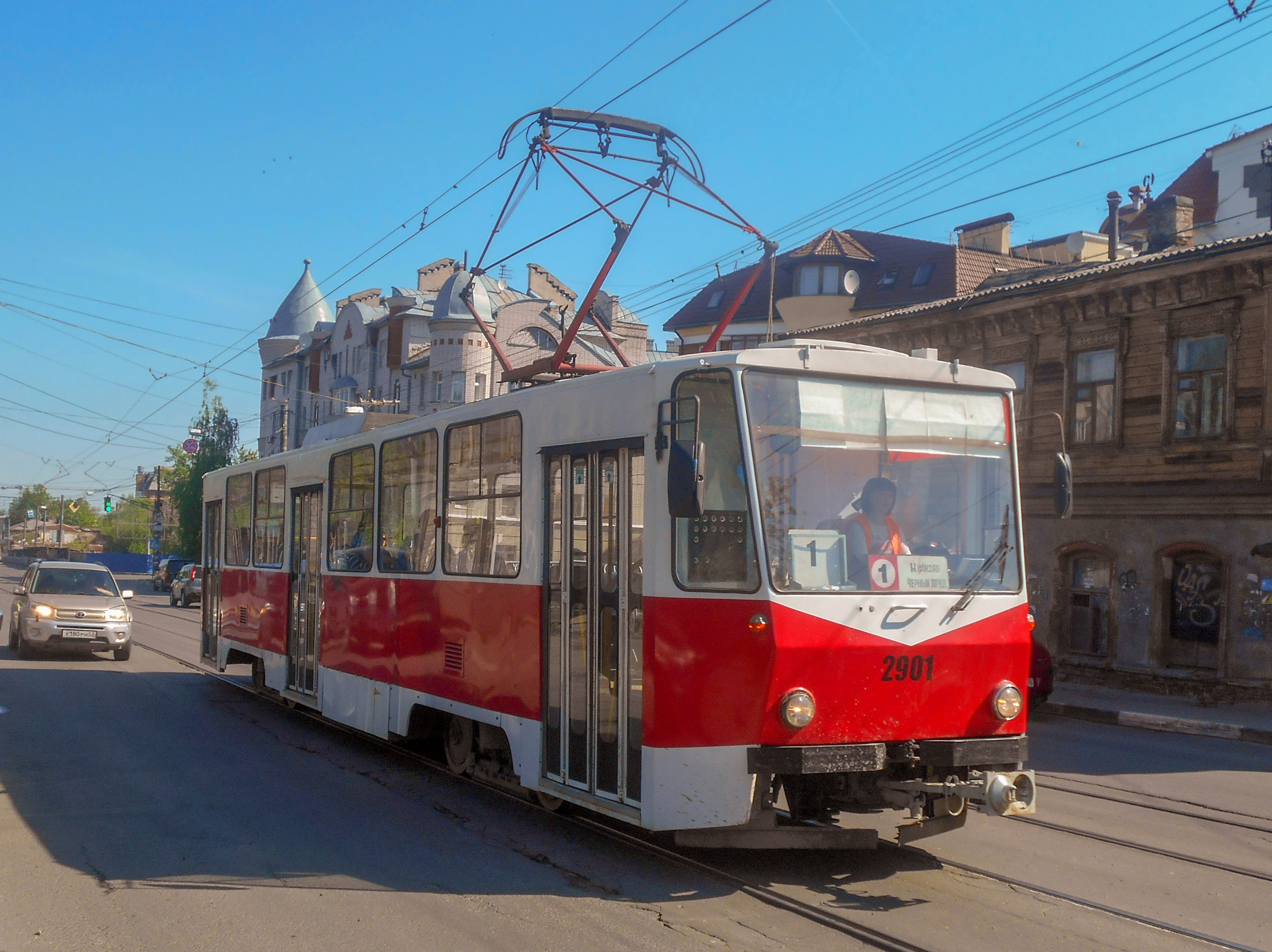
Tatra Т6В5 in Nizhny Novgorod, 2901, 2016

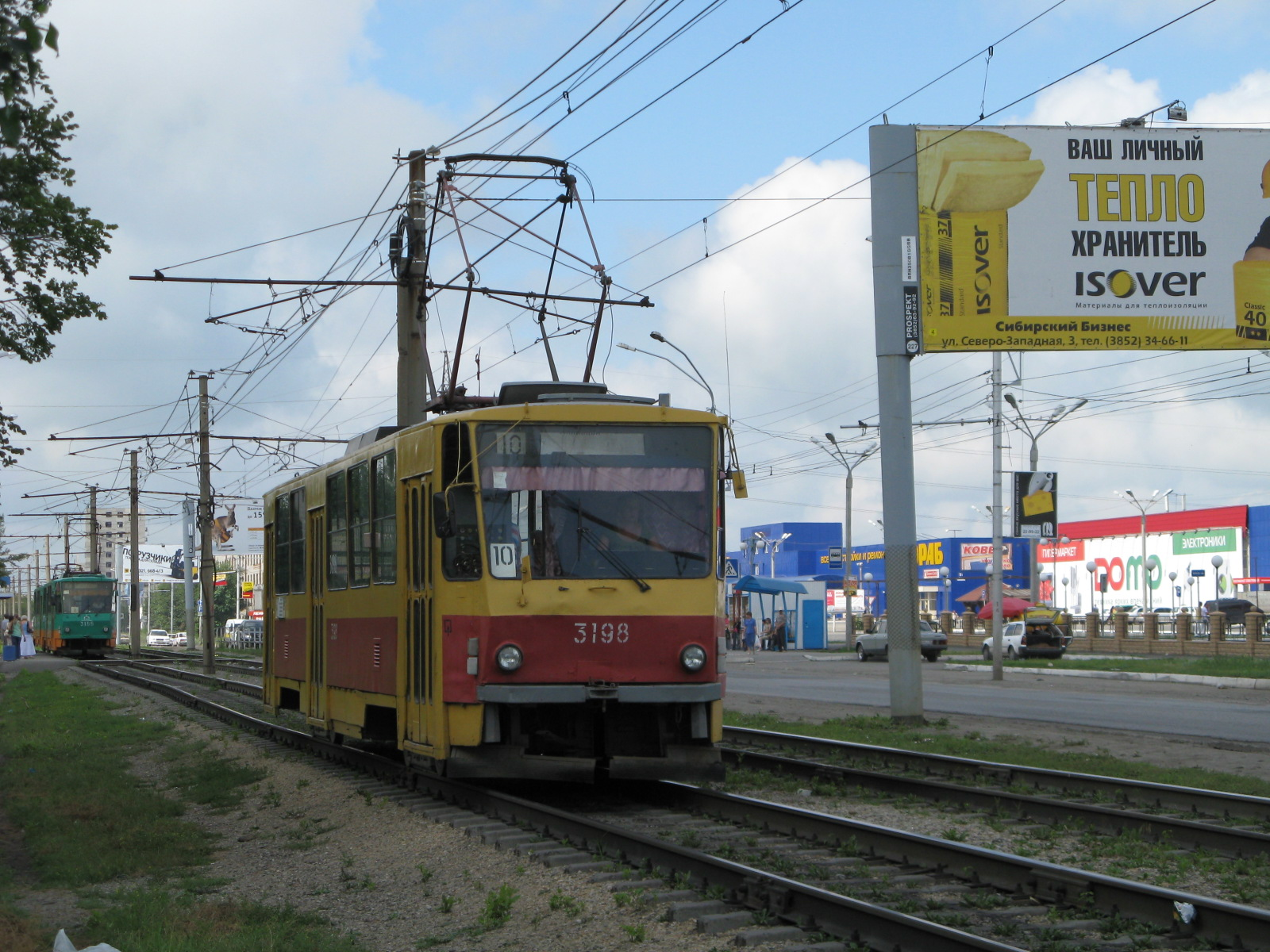
T6B5 in Barnaul, 3198

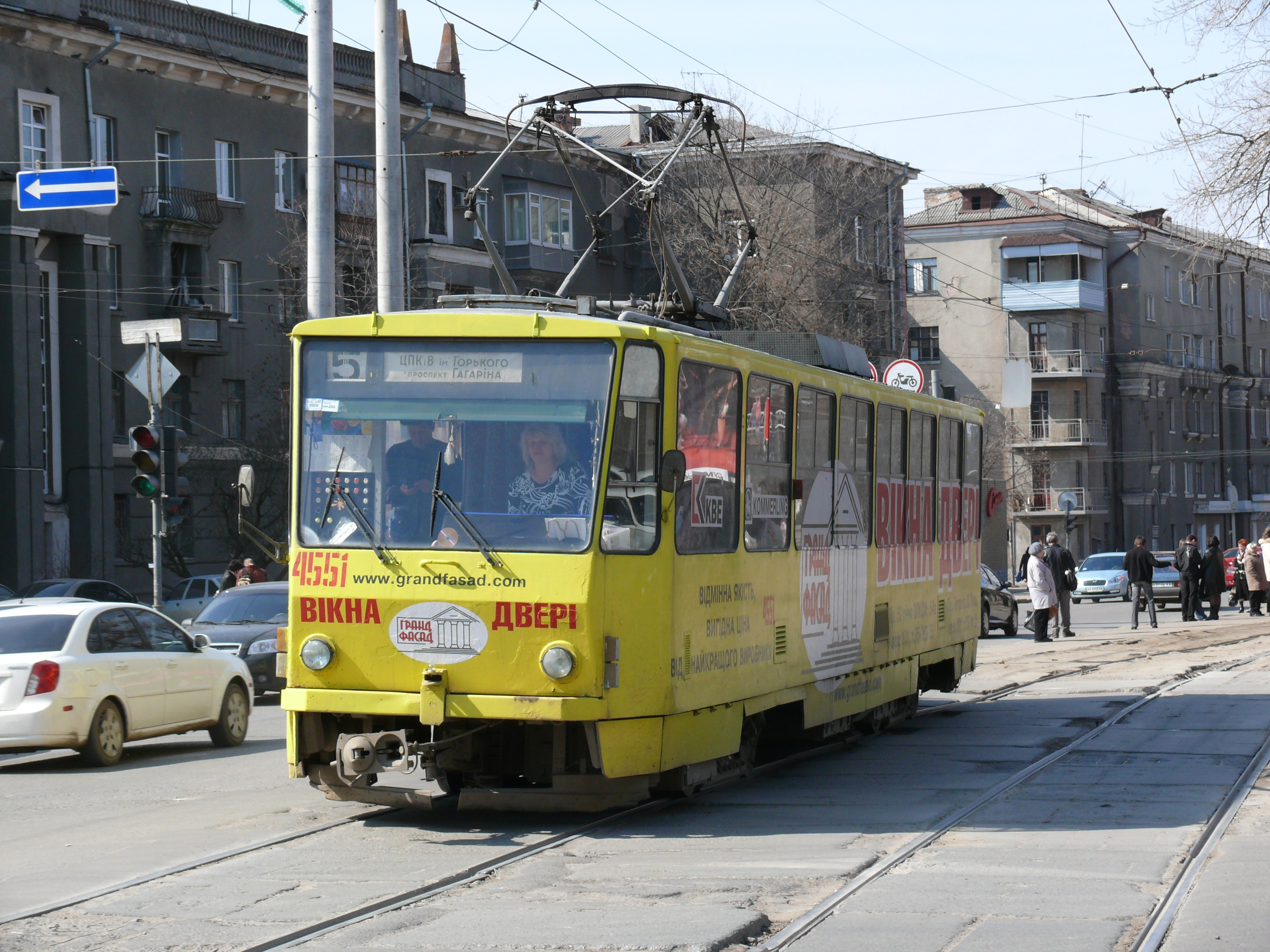
T6B5 in Kharkiv, 4551, 2008

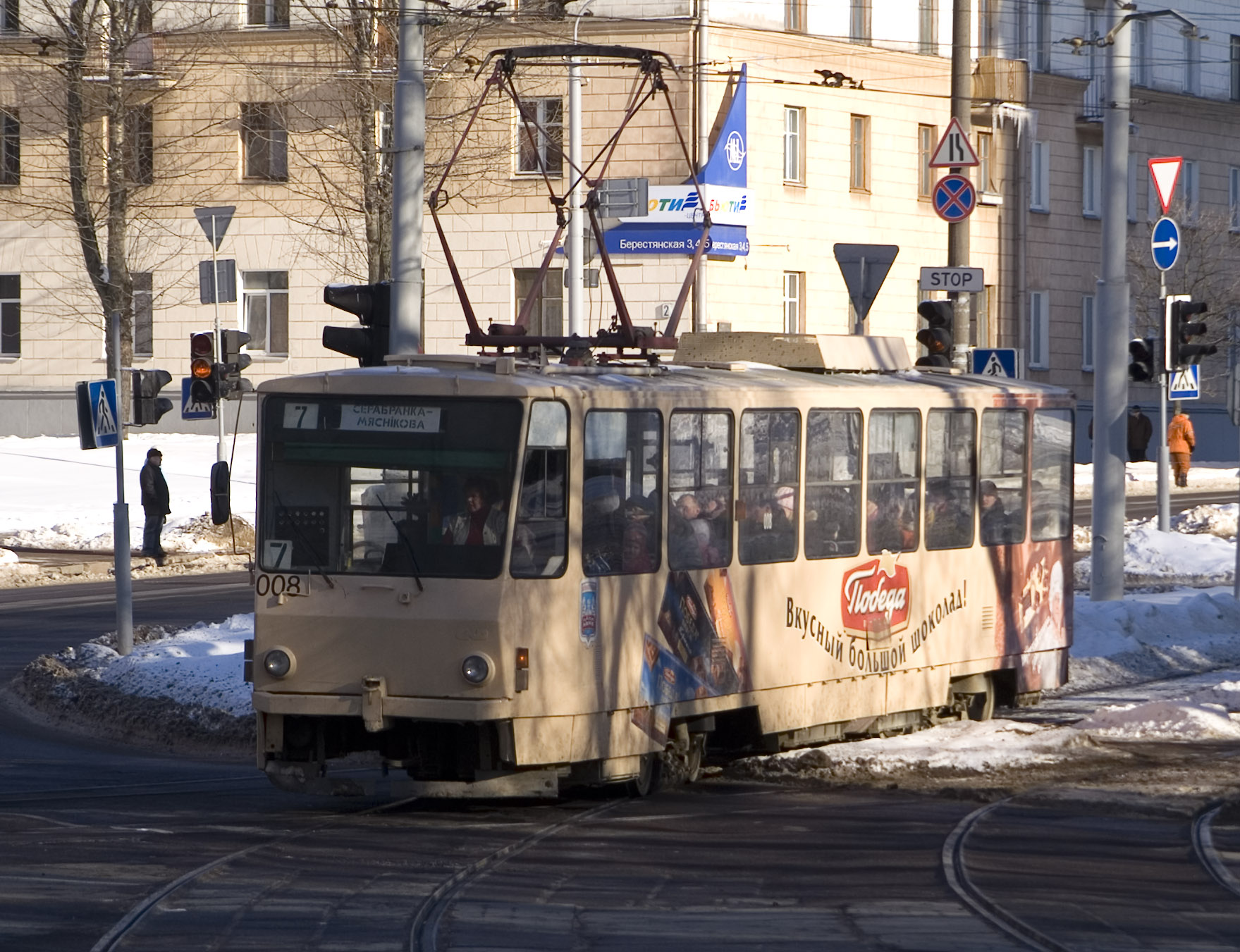
T6B5 in Minsk, 008, 2007

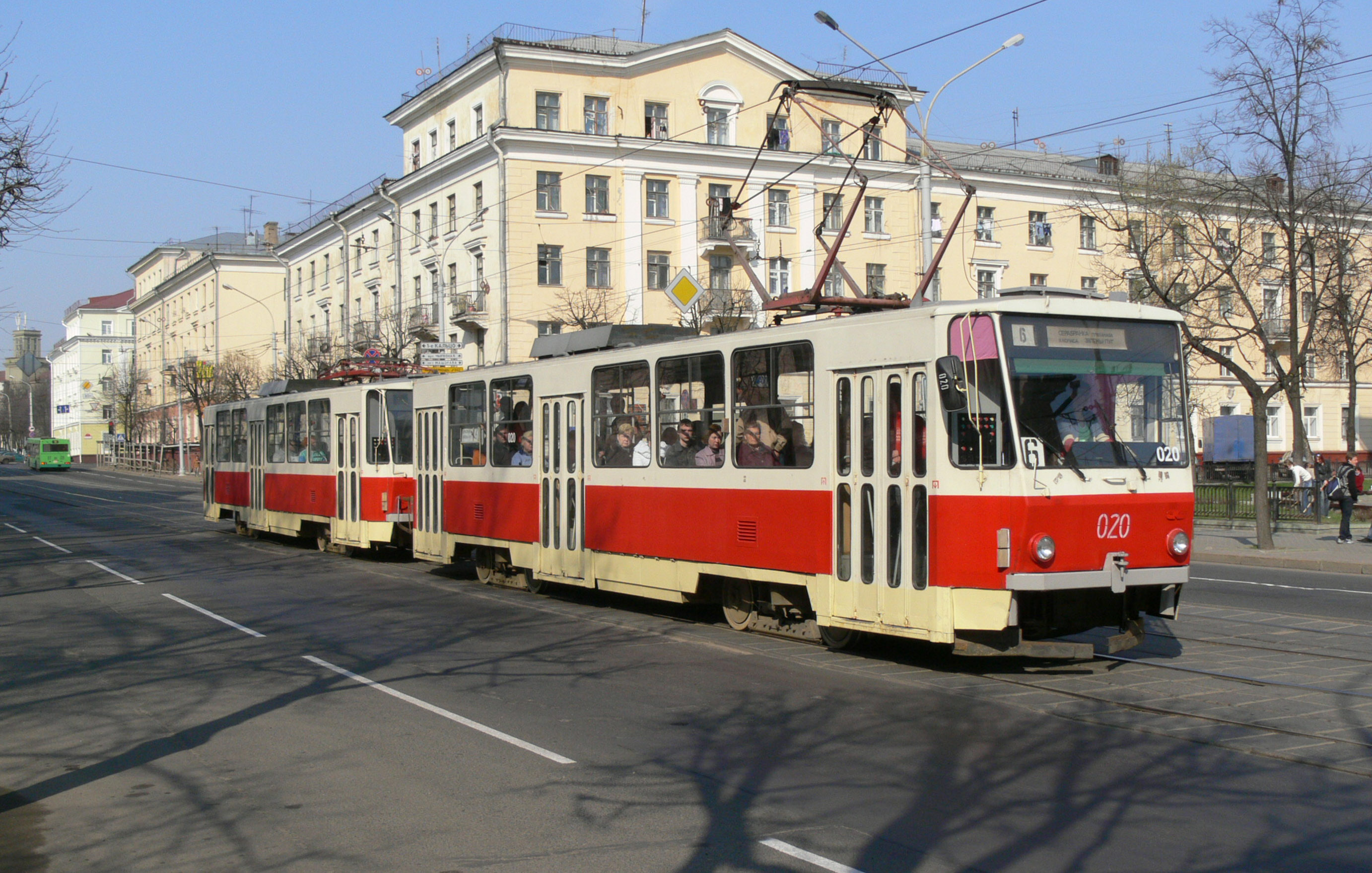
T6B5 coupled by multiple traction system in Minsk, 020+019, 2006

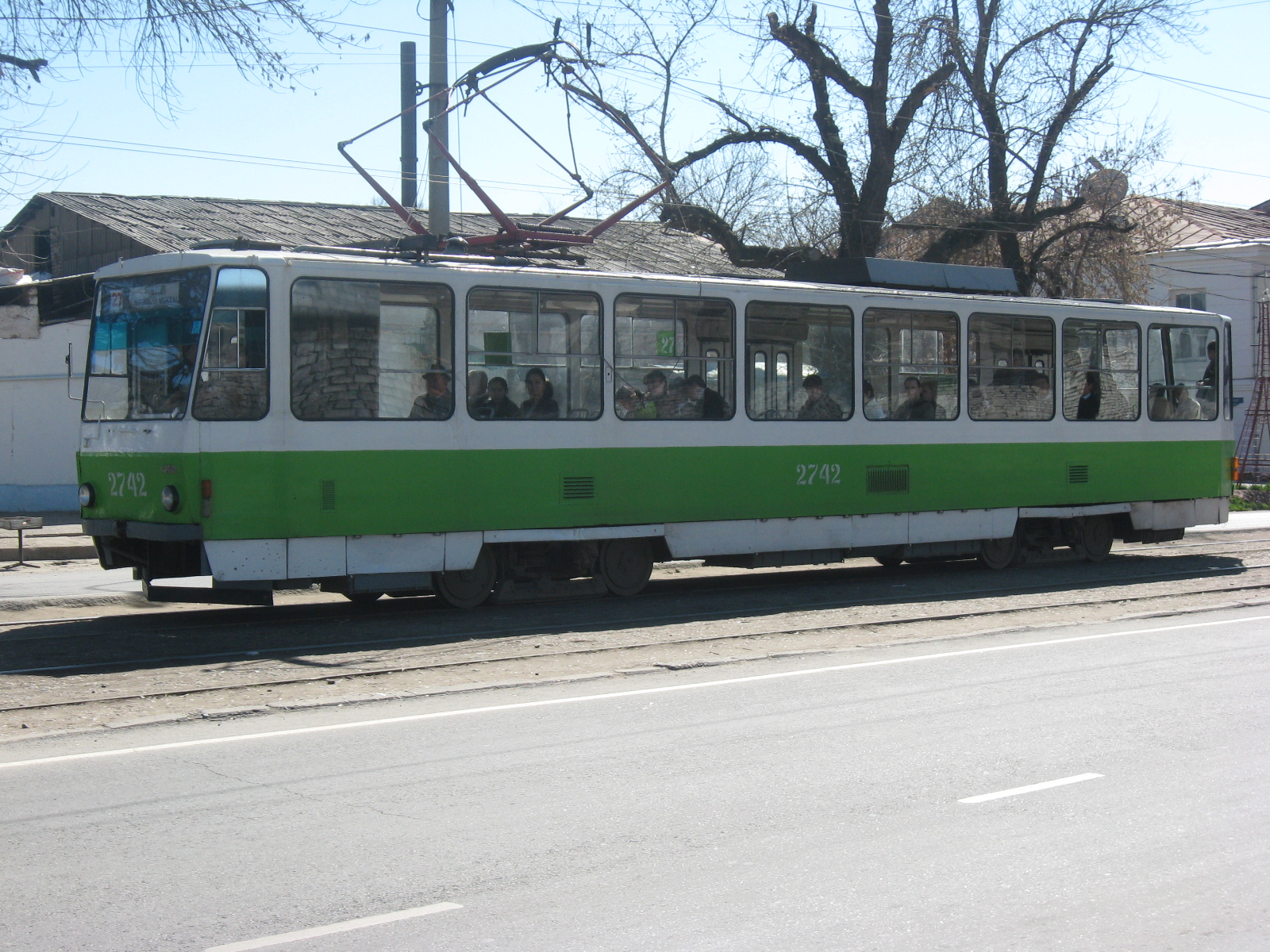
Т6В5 in Tashkent, 2742, 2009

== See also ==
- Pyongyang tram system
- Trams and trolleybuses in North Korea
