= Tatra-Yug =

Ukrainian manufacturer of trams

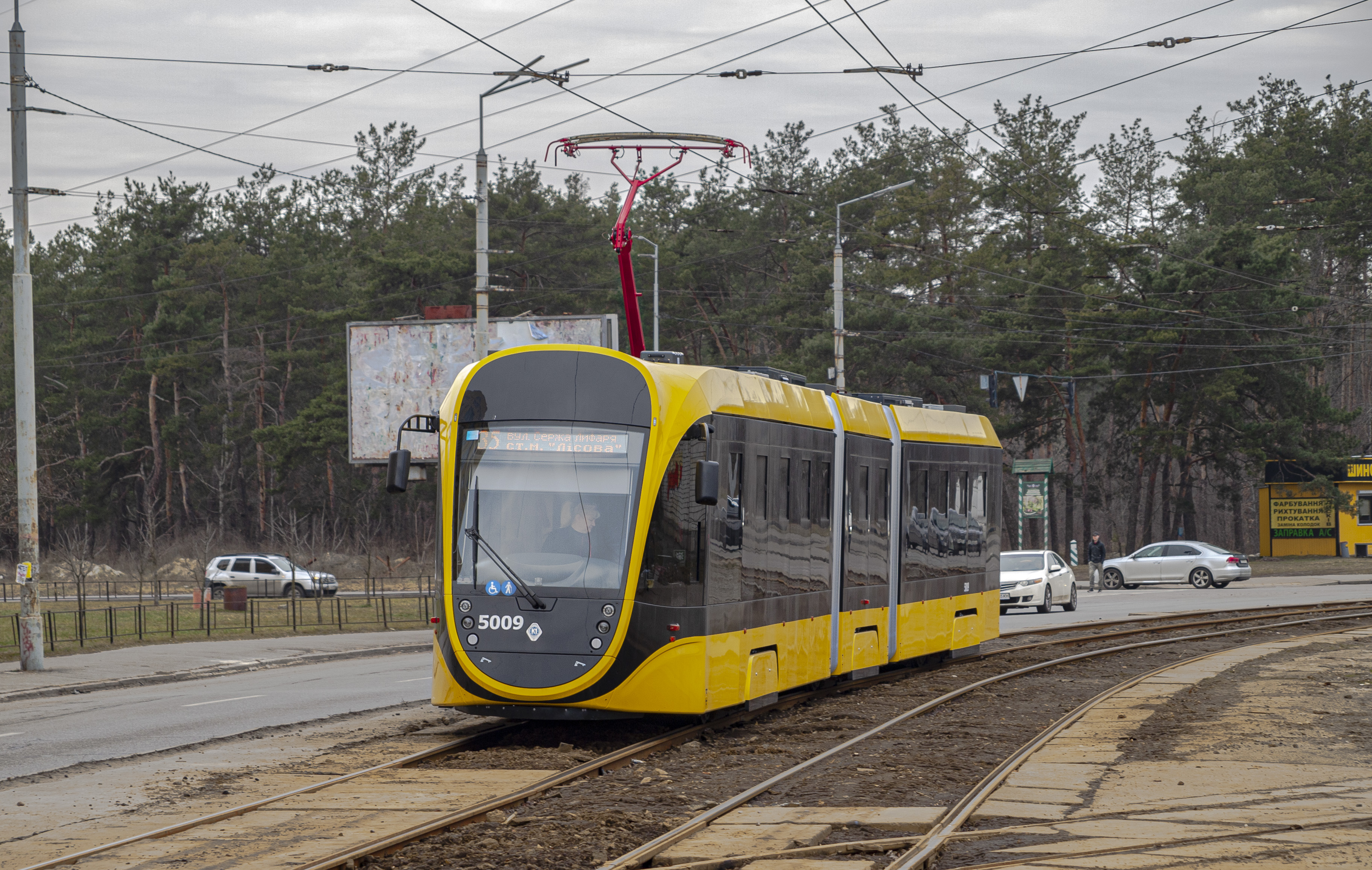
- Tatra-Yug K1T in Kyiv
- Native name: Татра-Юг
- Company type: Limited liability company
- Predecessor: ČKD Tatra
- Founded: November 25, 1993; 32 years ago in Dnipropetrovsk, Ukraine
- Founder: Valentyna Koval
- Headquarters: Dnipro, Ukraine
- Key people: Anataliy Kedivara
- Products: Trams
- Parent: Ukragrosoyuz
- Website: tatra-yug.com.ua/en/

Tatra-Yug (Russian: Татра-Юг, Tatra-South) is a Ukrainian tram manufacturer that rents the facilities of Pivdenmash in Dnipro. The company was founded in 1993 to assemble Tatra T6B5 trams of Czech manufacturer ČKD Tatra, after their bankruptcy in early 2000's Tatra-Yug began to produce trams designed in house.

== Products ==
Picture	Model	Modifications	Years	Operated in
	T6B5		1994–2004	Ukraine; Dnipro; Donetsk; Kamianske; Kyiv; Mykolaiv; Zaporizhzhia
	K1	K1; K1M8; K1M; K1M6; K1E6	2001–2020	Egypt; Alexandria; Ukraine; Donetsk; Kamianske; Konotop; Kryvyi Rih; Kyiv; Luhansk; Odesa; Mariupol; Mykolaiv; Zaporizhzhia
	K1T	K1T306	2021–present	Ukraine; Kyiv; Odesa; Dnipro
