= Trams in Košice =

Tram system in Košice, Slovakia

Košice tram network Električková doprava v Košiciach
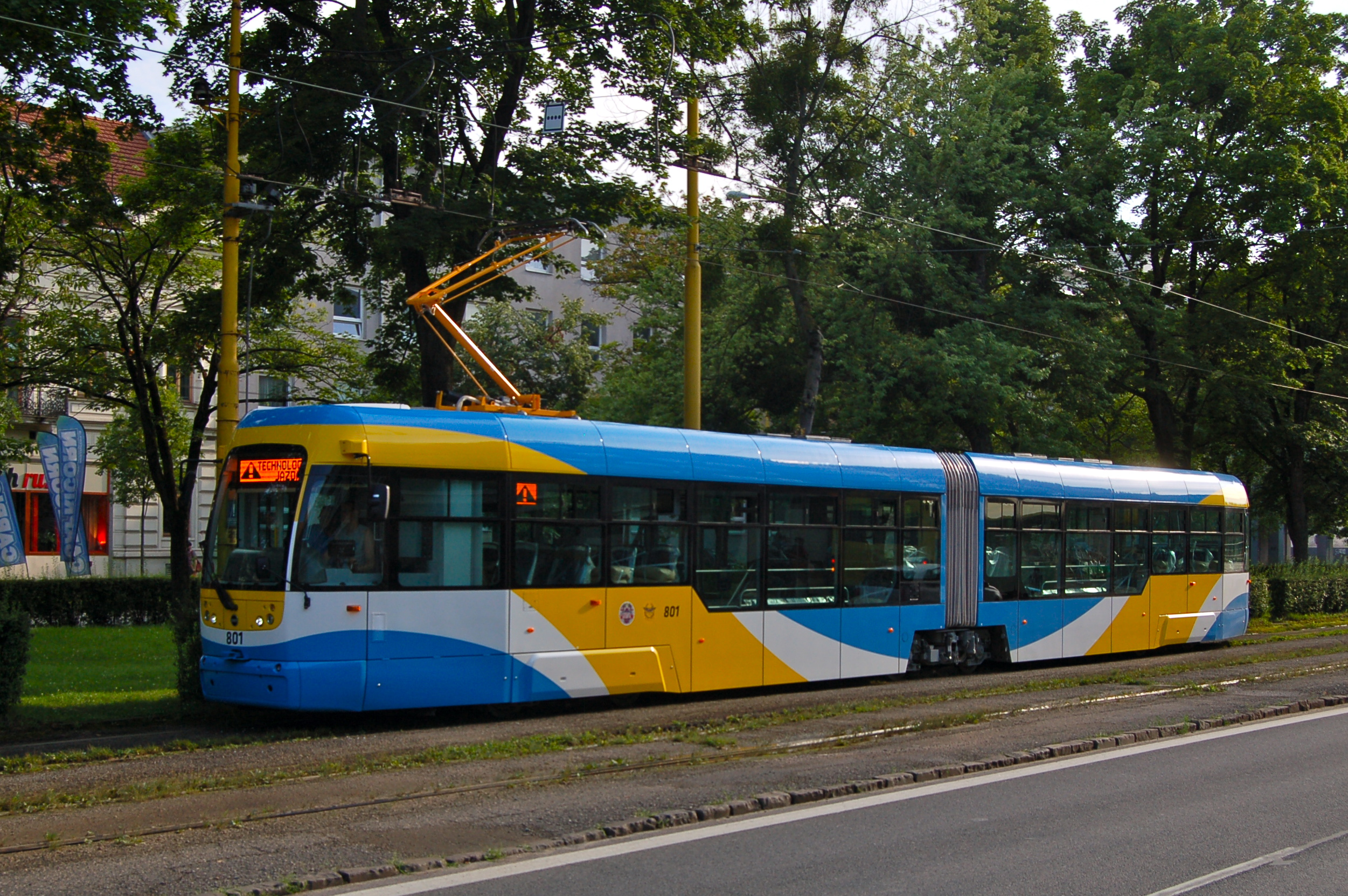
- Czech tram Vario LF2+ in Košice

Operation
- Locale: Košice, Slovakia
- Open: 1891 (horse tram); 1913 (electric)
- Status: Operational
- Routes: 16
- Operator: Dopravný podnik mesta Košice

Infrastructure
- Track gauge: 1,435 mm (4 ft 8 1/2 in)
- Electrification: 600 V DC
- Stock: 111 tram vehicles

Statistics
- Track length (single): 33.7 km (20.9 mi)
Overview
Map of the network in 2020
- Website: http://www.dpmk.sk DPMK

Košice tram network (Slovak: Električková doprava v Košiciach) serves the city of Košice in eastern Slovakia since its opening in 1895. It is operated by Dopravný podnik mesta Košice, a. s.

The network uses standard 1,435 mm (4 ft 8 1/2 in) gauge. The system launched with horse trams in 1891 and trams in the city have been electrically powered since 1913. Rolling stock consists of 111 tram vehicles and trams operate on sixteen lines over approximately 33.7 km (20.9 mi) of track. Eight of these lines operate in the city of Košice with the other eight rapid tram lines serving Košice city center and the U.S. Steel plant in Košice located approximately 13 kilometres (8.1 mi) away from city centre.

== History ==
=== Early years ===
On 14 November 1891, the first section of the horse railway was put into operation from the railway station through the Main Street to the Economic School (now Poliklinika Sever). Between 1895 and 1913, seven new steam locomotives were put into operation. The dual operation of horse and steam traction proved to be unreliable by that time. The network was electrified in 1913.

In 1964, the fast line to the Eastern Slovak IronWorks (now United States Steel Košice) was put into operation with a length of 13 km. Since 1979 until newer rolling stock entered the network, three-car T3 sets have been operated on the high-speed line which was unique to the territory of Czechoslovakia. Each train set thus was almost 45 meters long.

=== Post-communism ===
After the 1989 revolution, the transport company was transferred from the state to the city, which resulted in organizational changes of transport and the extension of tram line intervals. Three of the nine inner-city lines were cancelled (lines 1, 5 and 8). No new lines were launched since 1990, and only the most necessary investments were made. After 1989, KT8D5 and T6A5 trams were delivered to Košice. Because they reduced traffic performance, the 40 KT8 vehicles supplied proved redundant and since 1992 some of them have been sold to Miskolc (10 units), Strausberg (3 units) and Sarajevo (4 units).

On T6A5 trams, automatic coupling heads have been replaced with classic Prague type coupling heads (identical to the type on T3 vehicles). Between 2003 and 2009, eight KT8D5 trams were retrofitted with a medium low-floor and several T3 trams have also been upgraded with electronic panels, new interiors and fresh coating.

In April 2011, the first units of low-floor Vario LF trams were delivered to Košice.

=== Recent times ===
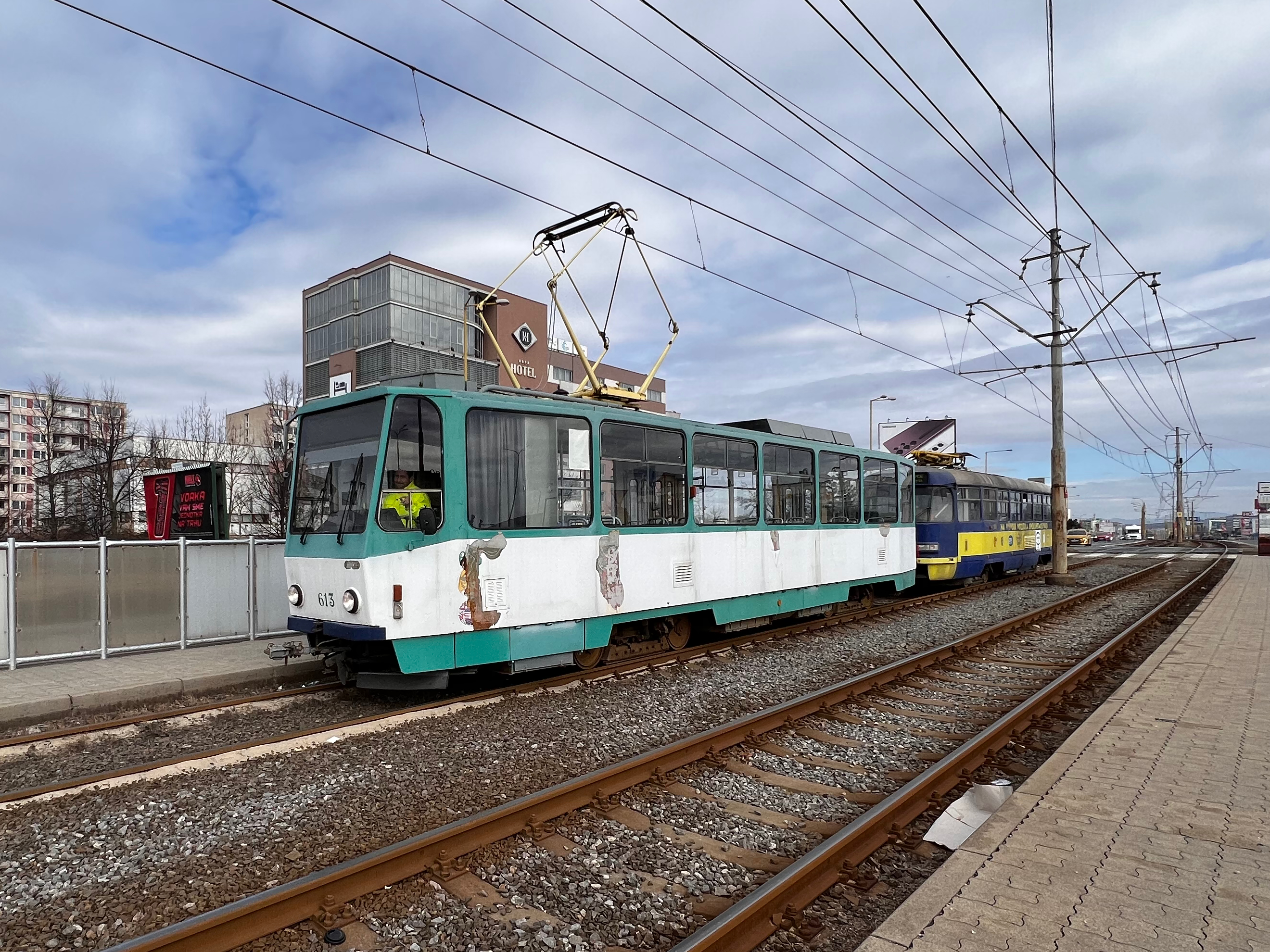
Trams 613+359 during their transfer to United States Steel

In 2014, Košice received investment from the EU Cohesion Fund for modernization of its network. Between 2014 and 2018, 46 brand new partially low-floor Vario LF2+ trams were delivered to Košice. Repairs and modernizations of tracks were done in phases; phase 1 between 2014 and 2015, phase 2 in 2015 with phase 3 repairs undertaken between 2016 and 2018.

Due to reconstruction of the Bardejovská tram depot, 27 trams were moved to railway sidings at United States Steel for long term storage in March 2022.

== Routes ==
=== Regular services ===
Eight regular services feature on the Košice tram network.

Regular services travel with 10 minute intervals in the morning rush hour, 15 minutes in between morning and afternoon, 12 minutes in the afternoon rush hour and 20 minute intervals in the evening.

Tram	Line
1	Važecká ↔ Havlíčkova
2	Staničné námestie ↔ Havlíčkova
3	Staničné námestie ↔ Važecká
4	Botanická záhrada → Socha Jána Pavla II.
5	Staničné námestie ↔ OC Optima
6	Staničné námestie ↔ Havlíčkova
7	Socha Jána Pavla II. → Botanická záhrada
8	Važecká ↔ Kavečany
9	Námestie Maratónu mieru ↔ Važecká

=== Rapid tram services ===
Eight rapid tram line rotate between Košice's districts and the U.S. Steel plant in Košice.

Tram	Line	Notes
R1	Vstupný areál U. S. Steel ↔ Staničné námestie	regular service with varied intervals during the day
R2	Vstupný areál U. S. Steel ↔ Važecká	11 connections per day
R3	Vstupný areál U. S. Steel ↔ Havlíčkova	9 connections per day
R4	Vstupný areál U. S. Steel ↔ Botanická záhrada	Connections from dormitories to the campus of the Technical University
R5	Vstupný areál U. S. Steel ↔ Ryba	1 morning connection per day
R6	Vstupný areál U. S. Steel ↔ Dopravný podnik mesta Košice	6 connections per day
R7	Vstupný areál U. S. Steel ↔ Amfiteáter	7 connections per day
R8	Vstupný areál U. S. Steel ↔ Barca	1 morning connection per day

== Rolling Stock ==
Photo	Type	Modifications and subtypes	Number	Note
	MWG #M1-M3		3	Two-axle freight trams
	MWG #1-18		1	Two-axle passenger trams
	Ringhoffer	Ringhoffer	4	
	Tatra T1	Tatra T1	1	
	Tatra T2	Tatra T2	1	
	Tatra T3	Tatra T3SUCS, Tatra T3Mod	6	A single T3 remains in service as a driver training car.
	Tatra KT8D5	Tatra KT8D5, Tatra KT8D5R.N2, Tatra KT8D5R.N2P	19	
	Tatra T6A5	Tatra T6A5	29	
	Vario LF	Vario LFR.S	1	
	Vario LF2+	Vario LF2+	46	
		Total	111	

== See also ==
- Public transport in Košice
- 1978 Košice tram accident
