= Tatra T3 =

Czech tramcar type

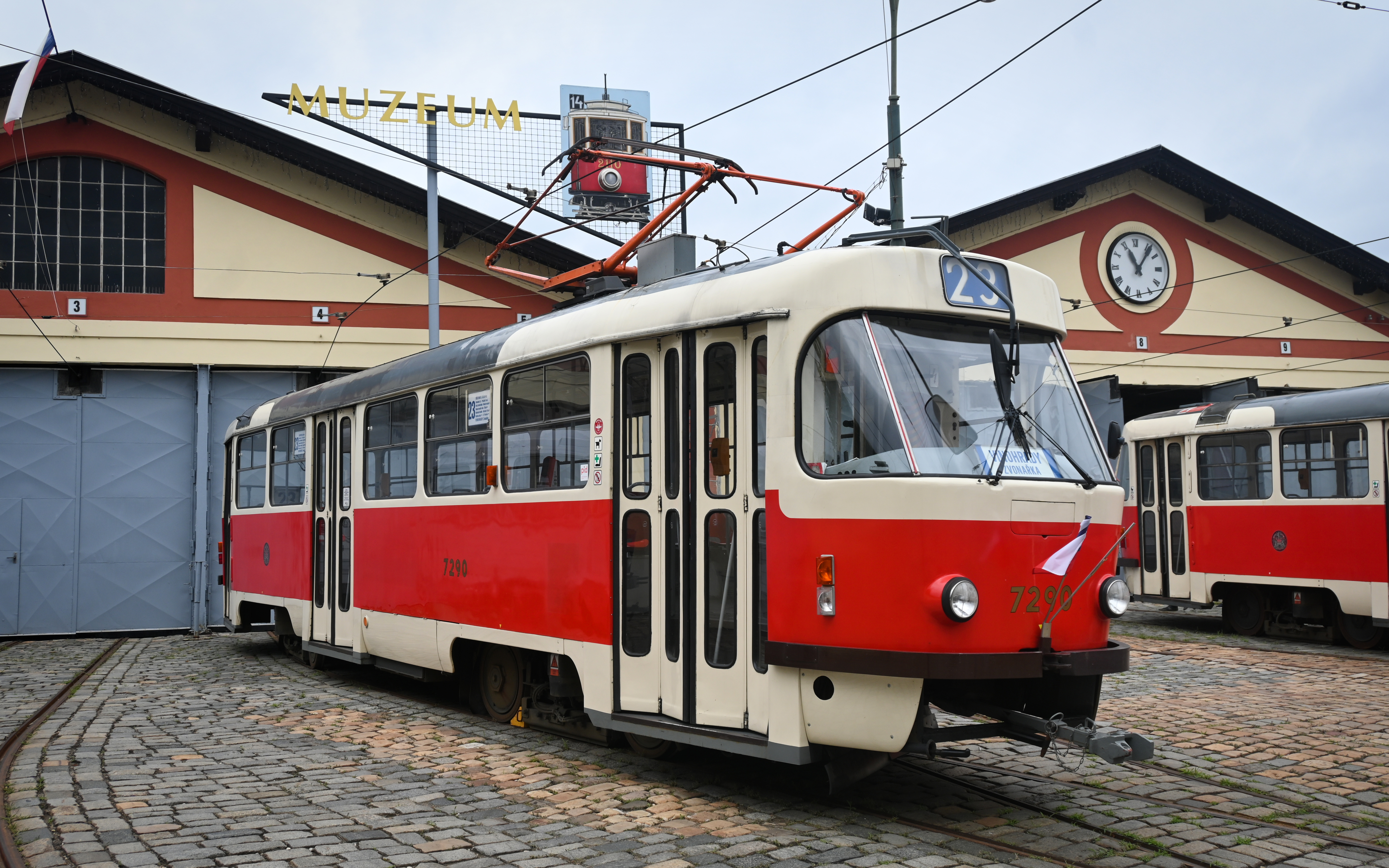
- Tatra T3SUCS in Prague

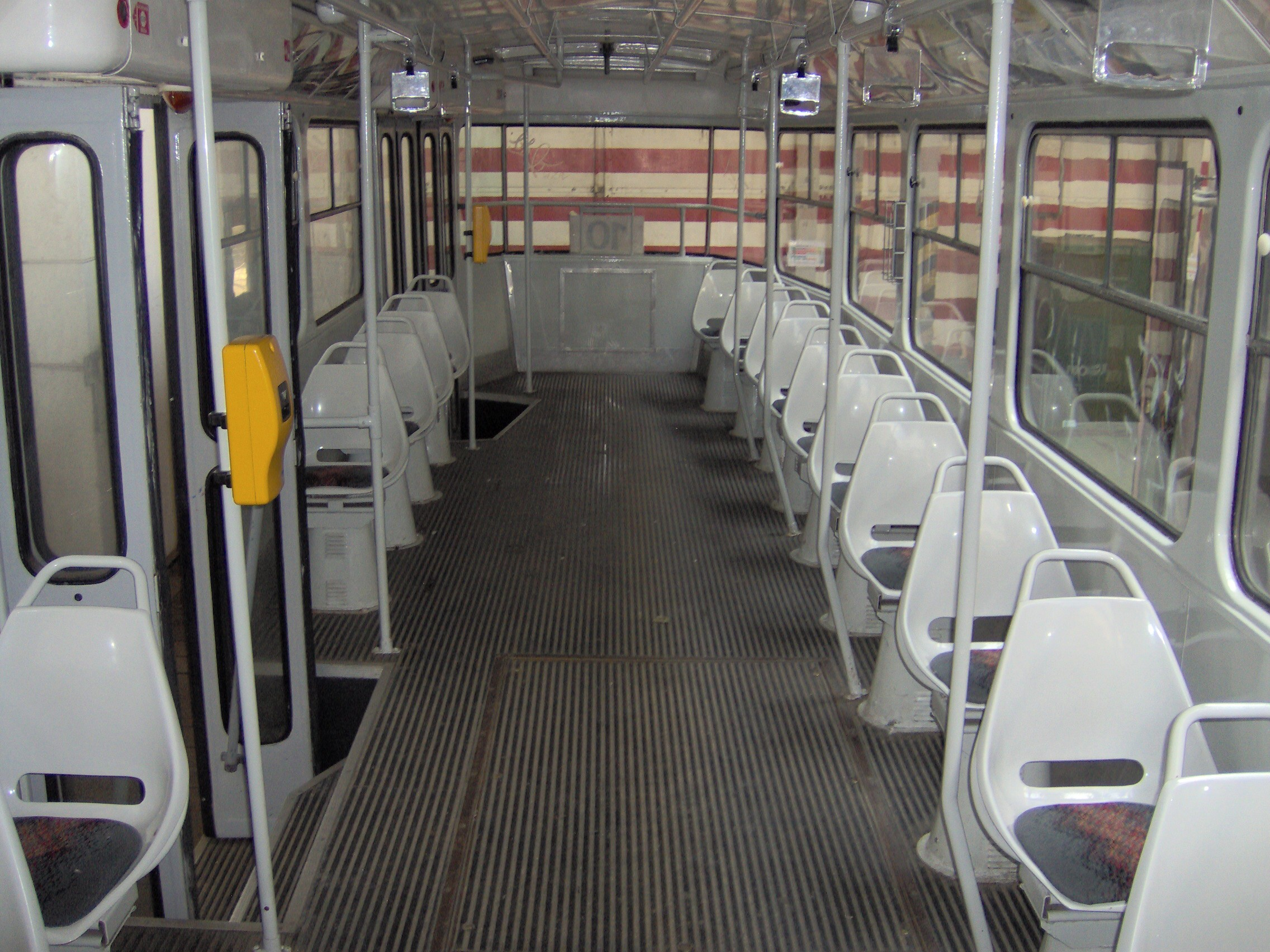
- Interior of old version
- In service: 1960–present
- Manufacturer: ČKD Tatra
- Assembly: Prague, Czech Republic
- Family name: Tatra
- Constructed: 1960–1997
- Entered service: 1960
- Number built: 13,945 + 131 bodies
- Predecessor: Tatra T2
- Successor: Tatra T6B5; Tatra T6A2; Tatra T6A5
- Capacity: 110 / 95 (T3SU)

Specifications
- Car length: 14,000 mm (45 ft 11 1/8 in)
- Width: 2,500 mm (8 ft 2 3/8 in)
- Height: 3,050 mm (10 ft 1/8 in)
- Doors: 3 / 2 (T3SU)
- Maximum speed: 65 km/h (40 mph)
- Weight: 16,000 kg (35,000 lb)
- Engine type: TE022
- Traction motors: 4
- Power output: 4×40 kW
- Electric system: 600 V DC
- Current collection: pantograph, trolley pole
- Wheels driven: 8
- Coupling system: Albert
- Track gauge: 1,435 mm (4 ft 8 1/2 in), 1,000 mm (3 ft 3 3/8 in), 1,524 mm (5 ft)

The T3 is a type of Czech tramcar produced by ČKD Tatra. A late-2000s study conducted on the Prague tram system has shown 98.9% reliability, the best of the Prague tram system fleet. During its period of production between 1960 and 1999, 13,991 powered units and 122 unpowered trailers were sold worldwide.

It became the most dominant tramcar model in Eastern Bloc countries, except for Poland, where locally produced trams from Konstal factory are still the mainstay in tram systems there, and Hungary, where ČKD only made inroads to the country's tram market during the late 1970s. Together with Soviet KTM-5 it is among the most produced trams, as of 2022, it is still the most widespread tram car in the world.

== Initial design ==
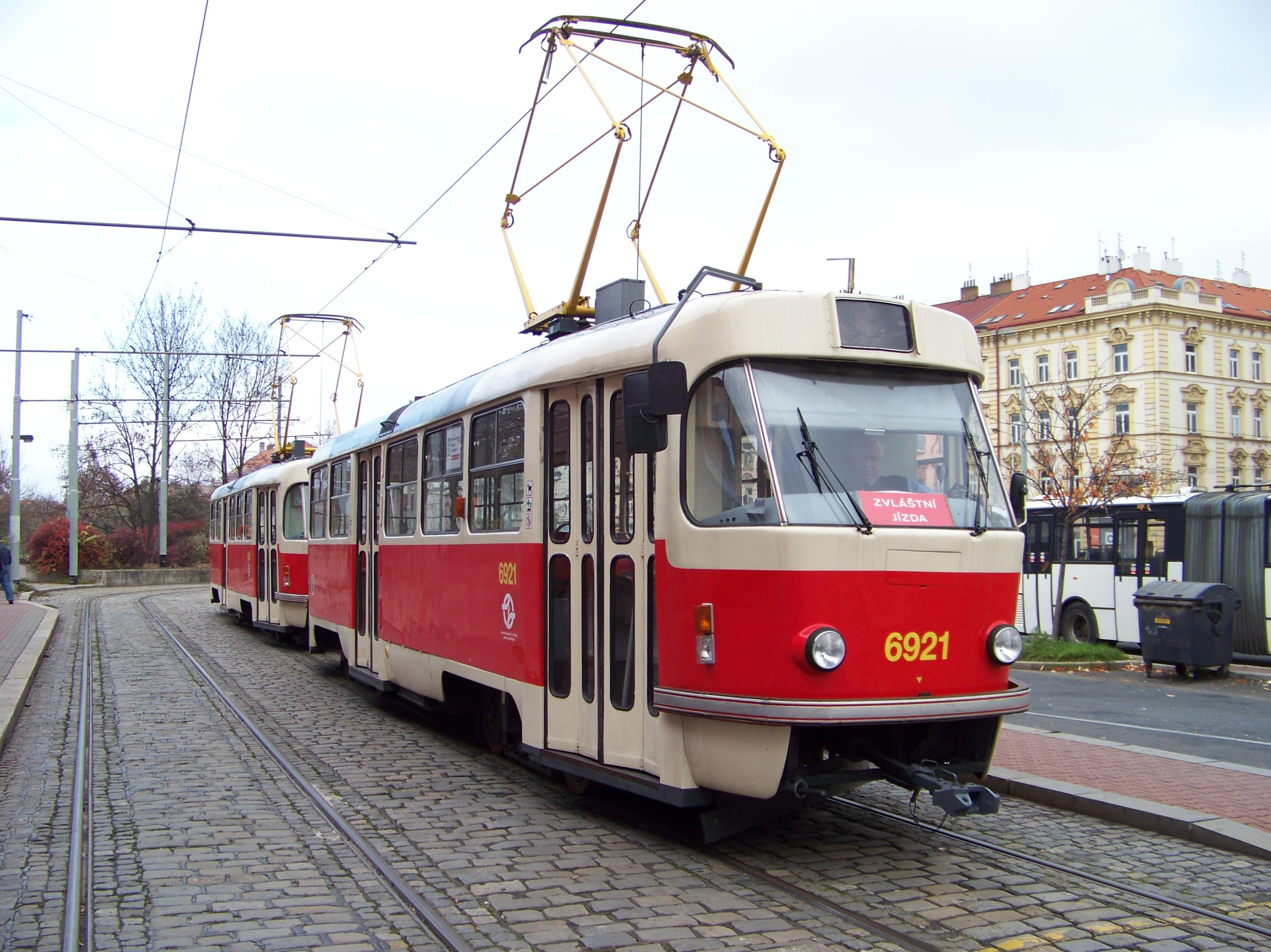
Tatra T3 in Prague

The design of the T3 follows the US PCC streetcar design, with two bogies, level floor and a single segment, able to run unidirectionally, as a solo unit or in a pair. It was specified to have the same capacity as its predecessor (the Tatra T2), but be lighter and easier to build. Some of the things that were done to meet this goal were making the walls thinner for lower weight, and after the first series, fitting the cars with laminate seats instead of cushioned leatherette seats such as the T2 used.

Just as with the T2, the T3's outer appearance was designed by František Kardaus. The lower part of the tram is made of a lightweight welded steel profile and sheet metal. The tram body consists of columns, which are additionally reinforced in their lower part by longitudinal struts. The cladding of this structure is made of steel sheets. Self-extinguishing fiberglass is used on the front walls of the tram. The floor of the car is made of reinforced moisture-resistant plywood, on which a grooved rubber carpet with a non-slip surface is also glued. The side glass windows of the tram are mounted in rubber profiles, while the upper parts of the windows on both sides of the tram are sliding. The walls in the tram saloon are covered in the lower parts under the windows with a layer of Umakart. Above it, they are protected by paint. The car was accessed through three four-part folding doors, whose width reached 1,343 millimetres (4.406 feet).

Power was provided by a pantograph, usually lowered and raised manually (through some had an electric gear for this purpose). The tram is powered by four TE 022 series-wound traction motors, each with an output of 44 kW, manufactured by the ČKD Praha company. Each pair on a bogie is connected in series, while both groups are connected in parallel. The motors are placed lengthwise, powering the wheels via a bevel gear, in order to reduce noise. Power was regulated by a set of resistors with a TR37 accelerator. A dead man's switch was left out compared to the T2. Braking was conducted in two stages, using the rear bogie's brakes in the first stage and all brakes in the second.

There were three roof flaps in the tram (at first opened by a removable crank, later by a passenger-operated lever). In addition to these, it was also possible to ventilate by opening the sliding parts of the windows (at first lower, later taking up roughly half the window's height). In the driver's cabin, ventilation is provided by slots located above the windshield. Heating is provided by electric heaters installed in the seat posts. The driver's seat is heated by its own unit located under the tram. Internal lighting is via fluorescent lamps, using the same voltage as the trolley. Initially, the layout was configured such that passengers would move around a conductor's station, which was later removed during conversion to ticket self-service operations. The length of the tram over the couplers is 15,200 millimetres (49.9 feet), while the car body itself is 14,000 millimetres (46 feet) long. Its width is 2,500 millimetres (8.2 feet) and the height of the roof above the rails is 3,050 millimetres (10.01 feet). Inside the car there were 25 seats and 75 standing places, with the seats having an alternating red and grey color scheme.

The T3 was delivered to all tramway companies in the former Czechoslovakia. It was most numerous in Prague, where over 1,000 vehicles were delivered. The T3 still forms (mostly in various modernised versions) the backbone of the Czech tram fleet.

== Derivatives ==
=== T3SU ===
(SU for Soviet Union)

As with the T2SU, the first T3SU was delivered with the modification of removing the middle door and replacing it with seats. Later cars, however, were delivered with the third door in place. Again, the vehicles had a closed operator's compartment and were adapted for the harsh climate. Altogether 11,368 T3SU were delivered, making it the largest production of a single type of streetcar worldwide. But because so many of one type were made, their replacement by more modern cars was slow.

The T3SU was delivered from 1963, first to Moscow and later to 33 further Soviet cities.

==== T3SUCS ====
(SUCS for Soviet Union-modified Czechoslovakia)

Originally, the production of the T3 was stopped in 1976 and focus shifted to newer vehicles. The Slovak city Košice, however, ordered two motor coaches as an exception. The production of the replacement type KT8D5 was slated to begin in 1985, but this model was by then obsolete. Further production of the T3 would have been too expensive, so instead vehicles of the type T3SU were re-imported and adapted. The closed operator's cab was maintained, the vehicles had all three doors in place, and differed from the original T3 only in a few details.

==== T3SU Evolution ====
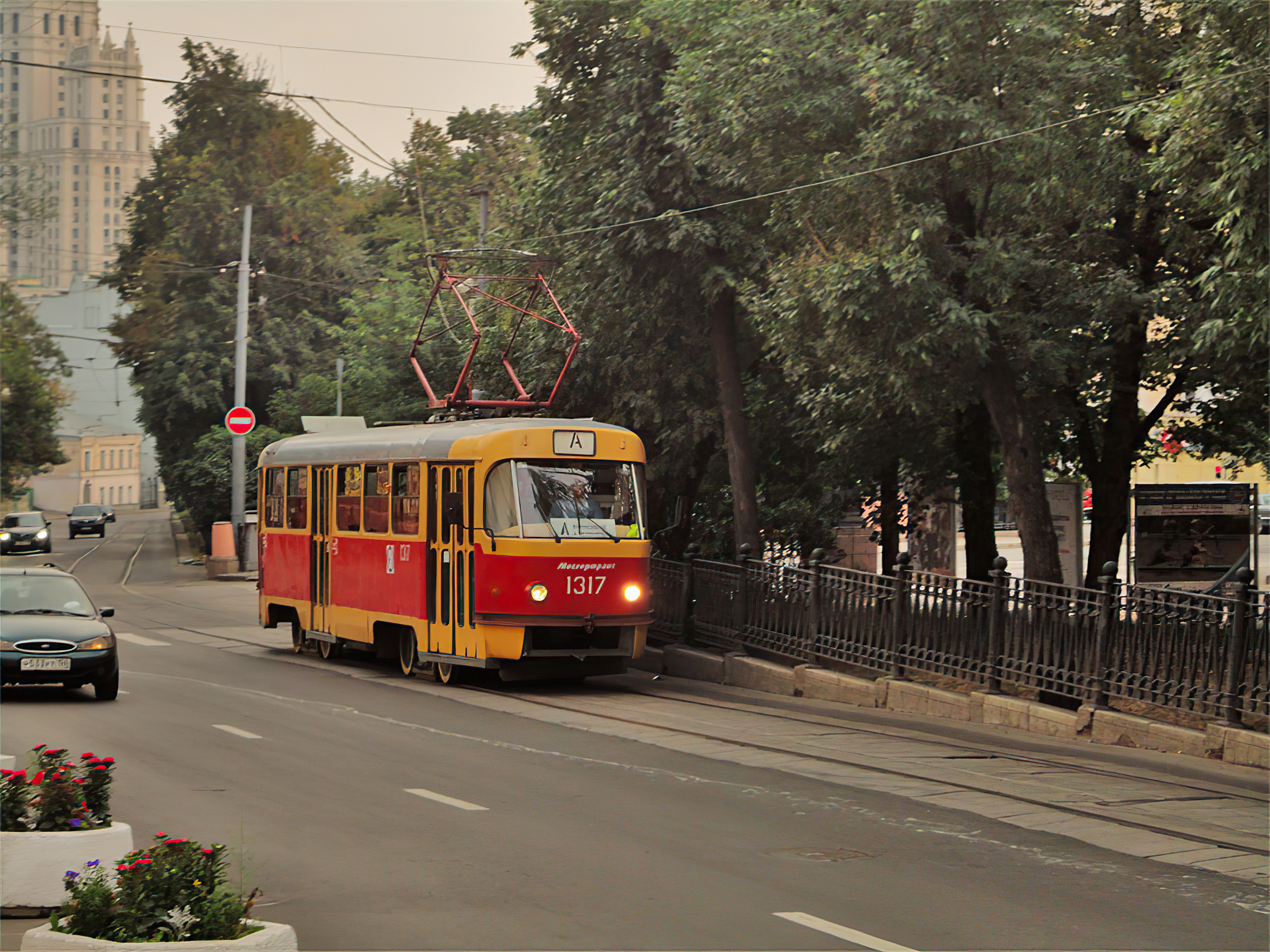
Tram modernized from T3SU to MTTD on the historic Boulevard Ring tram line in Moscow

Over time, the T3SU has had minor changes in both exterior appearance and interior design.

Exterior details:

- <1966: Narrow passenger windows disappeared
- ~1969: Narrow window route designators
- 1980s: Illuminated route indicator on top
- ~1985: Oval turn indicator at the front became two rectangular lights. The same lamps began to be fitted to the rear
- 1983 onwards: Small grid in the forward section of the tram on the left side
- ~1985: Two small red lamps near the tramcar-to-tramcar "control circuit port", both front and rear
- Additional red horizontal lamps from behind

Interior:

- Early 1960s to early 1970s: Sofa-style seats
- Early 1970s to mid-1980s: "Toilet"-like seats
- 1977–1978: Cream-coloured saloon (repainted yellow/dark-blue)

=== T3D ===
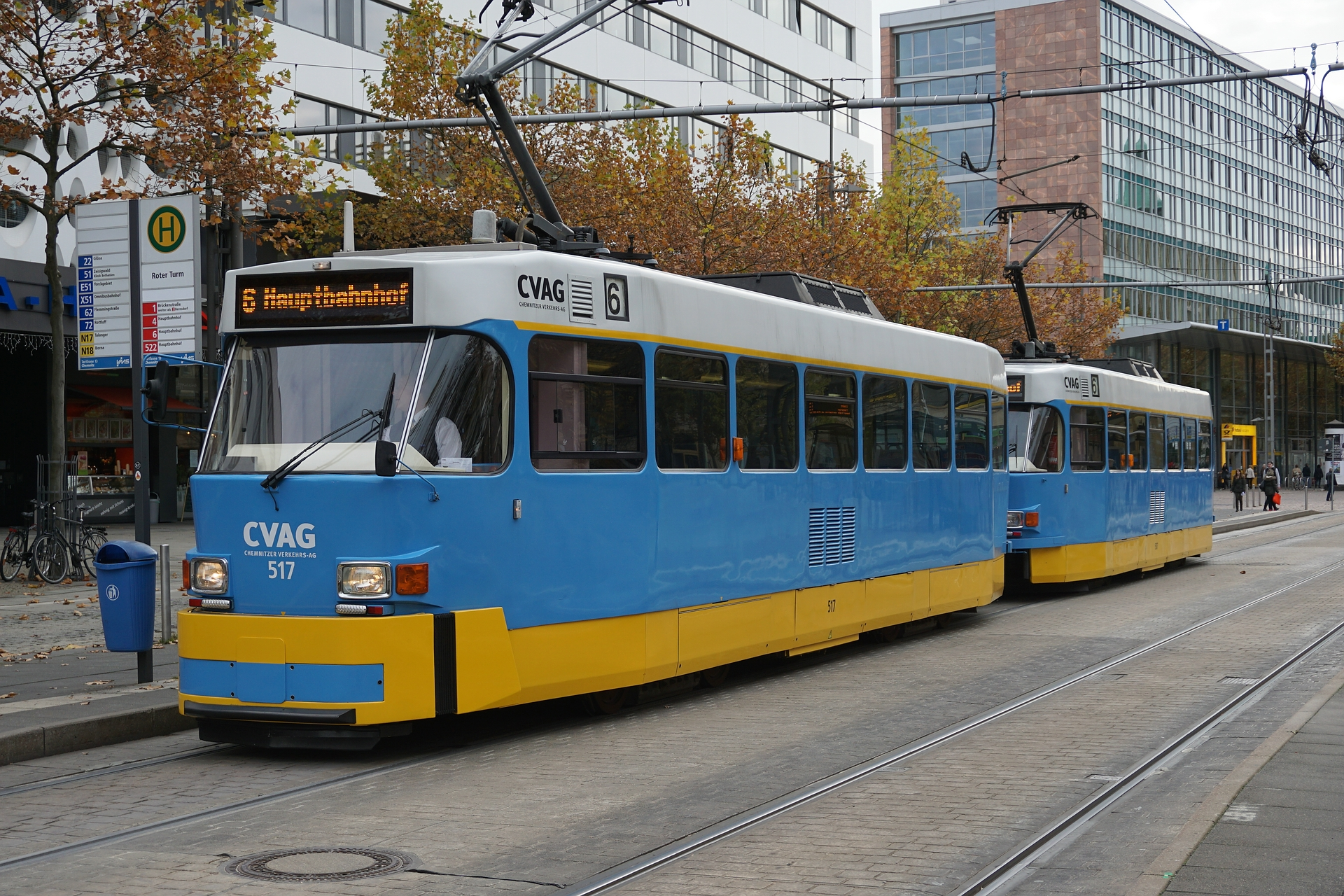
Modernized Tatra T3D-M tram in Chemnitz, Germany

(D for Deutschland)

In East Germany the first three T3D cars started operation in 1964 and the city of Dresden got its first delivery in 1965. The cars were used in part due to their width of 2.50 m (8 ft 2 in). They operated as single cars or as multiple units (motor+motor, motor+motor+trailer) and/or as mini trams (motor+trailer). The use of trailer cars was due to the use of original Czech T3 electrical equipment, which had enough power to support trailer cars, and was only present in Germany and Yugoslavia. However, due to reduced available power, the maximum speed of the streetcar reached only 55 km/h instead of the usual 65 km/h (40 mph). Today, only Chemnitz still maintains T3s as backups for regular service, which are designated as T3D-M (modified).

=== T3YU ===
(YU for Yugoslavia)

From 1967 onwards, vehicles supplied to Yugoslavia differed from the standard type T3 by having different pantographs and trucks. In addition, trailer cars were used, as in East Germany. Uncommonly, the network used narrow-profile vehicles, two of which could be found in Czechoslovakia and one in the Soviet Union.

=== T3R ===
(R for Romania)

At the end of the 1960s, Romania ordered RA cars as part of an agreement in the Comecon. The first vehicles came in 1970 to the city of Galați and had different electrical equipment from the Czechoslovak vehicles, to use the network's 750 V DC voltage. Since the carbodies were built too wide for use elsewhere, they remained in Galați. Only 50 units were delivered. Romania then opted for the narrower Tatra T4, which had more success, being still used in Bucharest as of 2025.

A few more of the same type were manufactured in 1997.

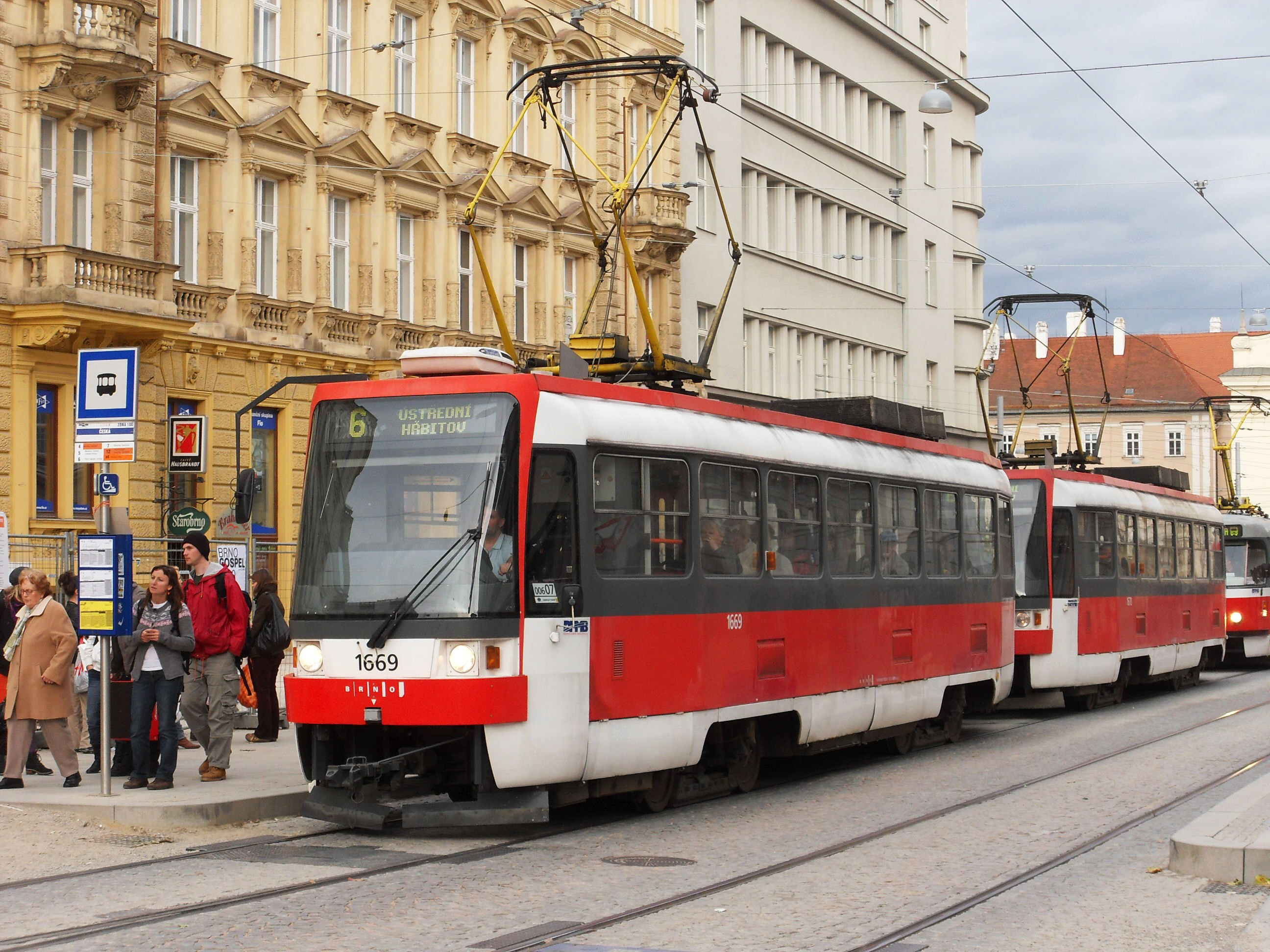
Tatra T3RF in Brno, Czech Republic

=== T3RF ===
(RF for Russian Federation)

Four Tatra T3RF were the very last T3 trams built. They were made for Samara and Izhevsk, but only Samara bought them. In 2002 the two others were sold to Brno and modernized.

=== Modernized Tatra-T3 trams ===
In most Czech cities and in some others such as Bratislava, Moscow, Riga, and Odesa, Tatra-T3 trams became very common. As a result, service and maintenance workers became very experienced at servicing them. This was one reason for modifying existing trams rather than replacing them with newer stock (the other being cost). Many of these modifications bear the designation T3R, whereby the 'R' stands for Czech word rekonstrukce (translating in this context as 'reconstructed') or T3M, with 'M' standing for 'modified'.

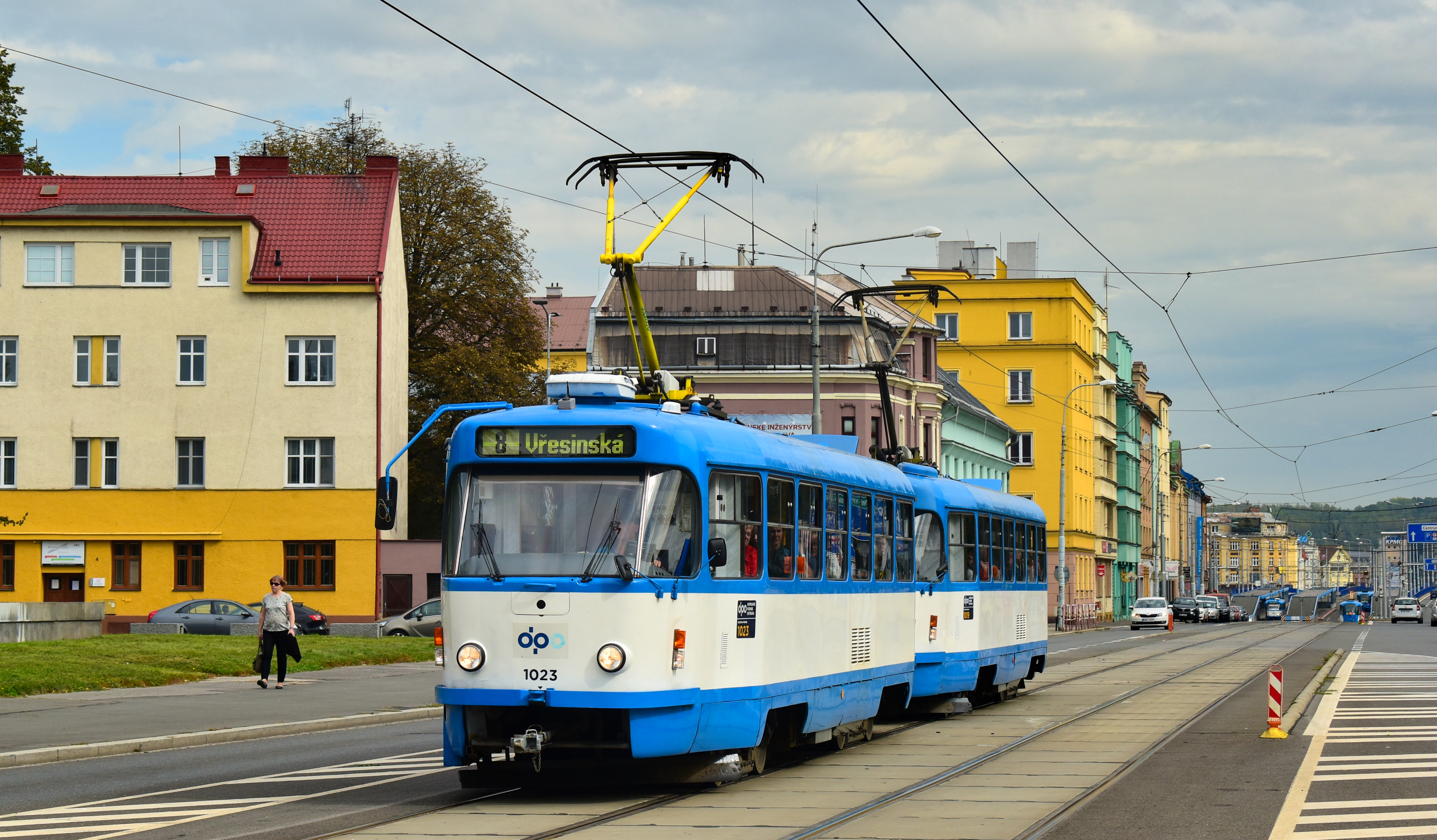
Tatra T3R.P in Ostrava, Czech Republic

Modernization normally includes:

- Restoration of the car body
- Digital/Electronic destination sign installation
- Audio information system
- Installation of new traction motors
- Thyristor-controlled motor traction system
- Refurbishing of the interior, which varies by city and transport authority
- Pantograph replacement (depending on the transport authority)

Modernisations of Tatra T3:

- Tatra T3R.P – IGBT Transistors by TV Progress
- Tatra T3R.E - TV Europulse electrical equipment
- Tatra T3G – TV-8 thyristors
- Tatra T3M.3 – TV-14 electrical equipment
- Tatra T3S – Body changes and TV-14 electrical equipment
- Tatra T3M.2-DVC – added the ability to open doors by buttons for passengers
- Tatra T3.04 (also known as Škoda 02T) - Škoda electrical equipment with IGBT transistors
- Tatra T3Mod - EVPÚ Nová Dubnica electrical equipment
- Tatra T3AS - Body changes and EVPÚ Nová Dubnica electrical equipment
- Tatra T3R.PV - PV Progress electrical equipment
- Tatra T3R.PVO – Changed front and back mask, same electrical equipment as T3R.P
- Tatra T3R – Body changes and TV-8 thyristors

==== VarioLF ====
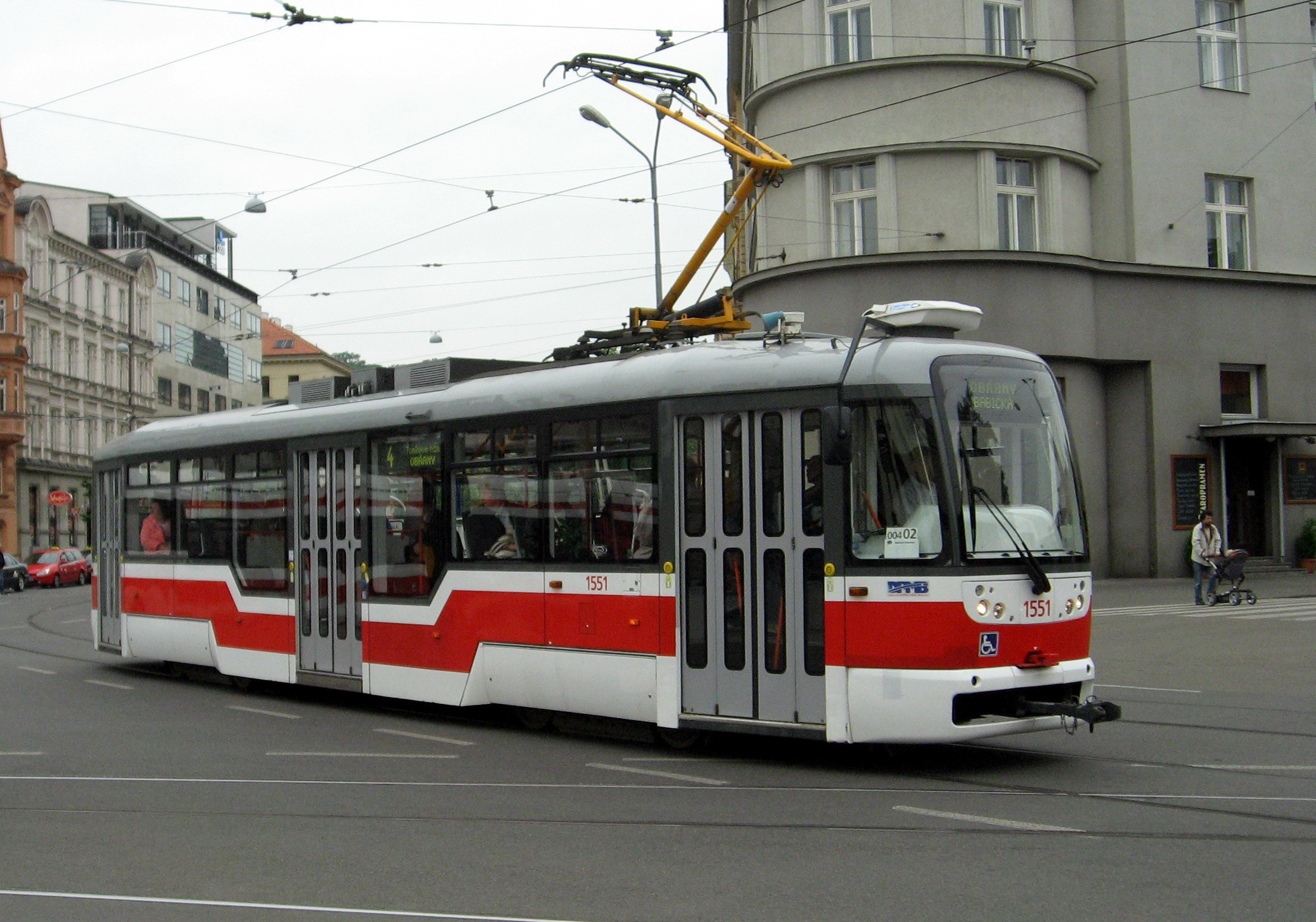
Low-floor VarioLF in Brno, Czech Republic

The VarioLF tram was developed by the Aliance TW Team, consisting of ČKD Pragoimex, VKV Praha and Krnovské opravny a strojírny (KOS), and is based on the Tatra T3R.EV chassis. However, it has some significant modifications, of which the main one was a lowered middle section - lengthening the tram by around 1m, as well as lending it the LF (Low Floor) designation. It also included a modernized interior and driver's cabin, new induction electric motors, TV Europulse electrical systems, a new pantograph, and most noticeably, new exterior styling by František Pelikán. It has 32 seats and 84 standing places, including a space for a wheelchair or baby carriage in the lowered section. A total of 166 units was produced between 2005 and 2020, of which a majority (144) went to various Czech cities, while the only other regular user was in Tashkent, Uzbekistan - although Slovakia and Russia both bought a single unit each for testing purposes. Some units are recorded as T3 modernizations, but the trams are in fact all-new. It is sometimes nicknamed by Czech rail enthusiasts as "wana" ("vana" meaning "bathtub" in Czech) thanks to the lowered section.

==== T3R.PLF ====
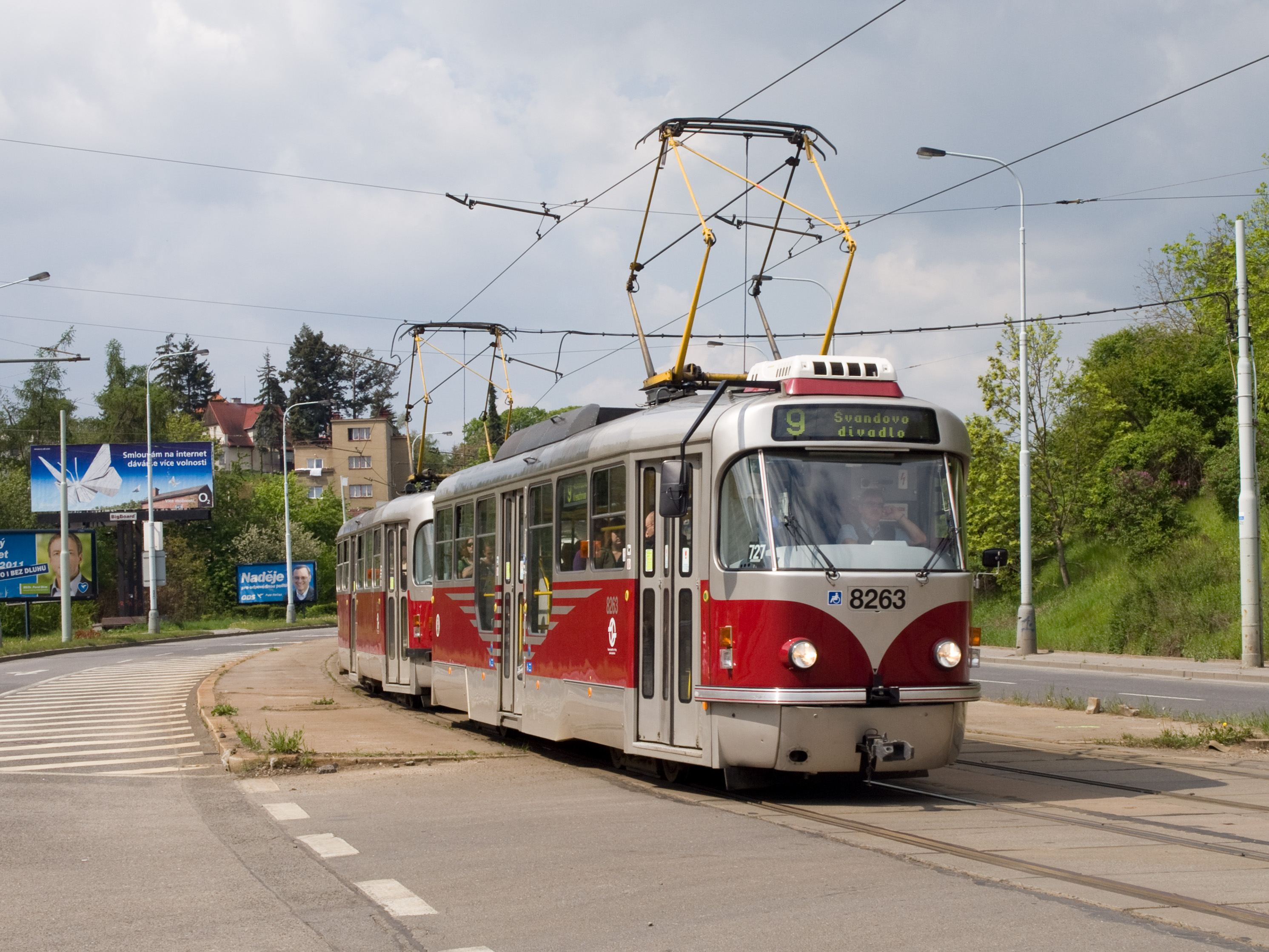
Low-floor T3R.PLF in Prague, Czech Republic

The most produced modernization of the Tatra T3 using the original styling was the Tatra T3R.PLF, at 108 units produced. It incorporates a low floor in the middle section, as well as new electrical equipment manufactured by TV Progress moving from under the floor to a distinct "hump" on the roof. This modification made the tram around 1m longer, which made it infeasible to hitch up with another T3R.PLF unit due to operational issues (for example, exceeding the length of some platforms), with Tatra T3R.PV being the designated second unit, which has many of the same modifications, but with a high floor. It has 22 seats and 105 standing places, including a space for a wheelchair or baby carriage in the lowered section. While all T3R.PLF trams are labeled as modernizations, they incorporate a large portion of new components, including the main chassis. 78 of the produced trams went to Prague, with further 12 and 18 units being sent to Liberec and Plzeň respectively. The manufacturing started in 2005, was briefly canceled between 2011 and 2017 in favor of the Tatra T3R.SLF model (similar in construction, but with Škoda electrical equipment), and continues to this day. It shares some elements with the VarioLF tram, including the "wana" nickname.

==== Articulated variants ====
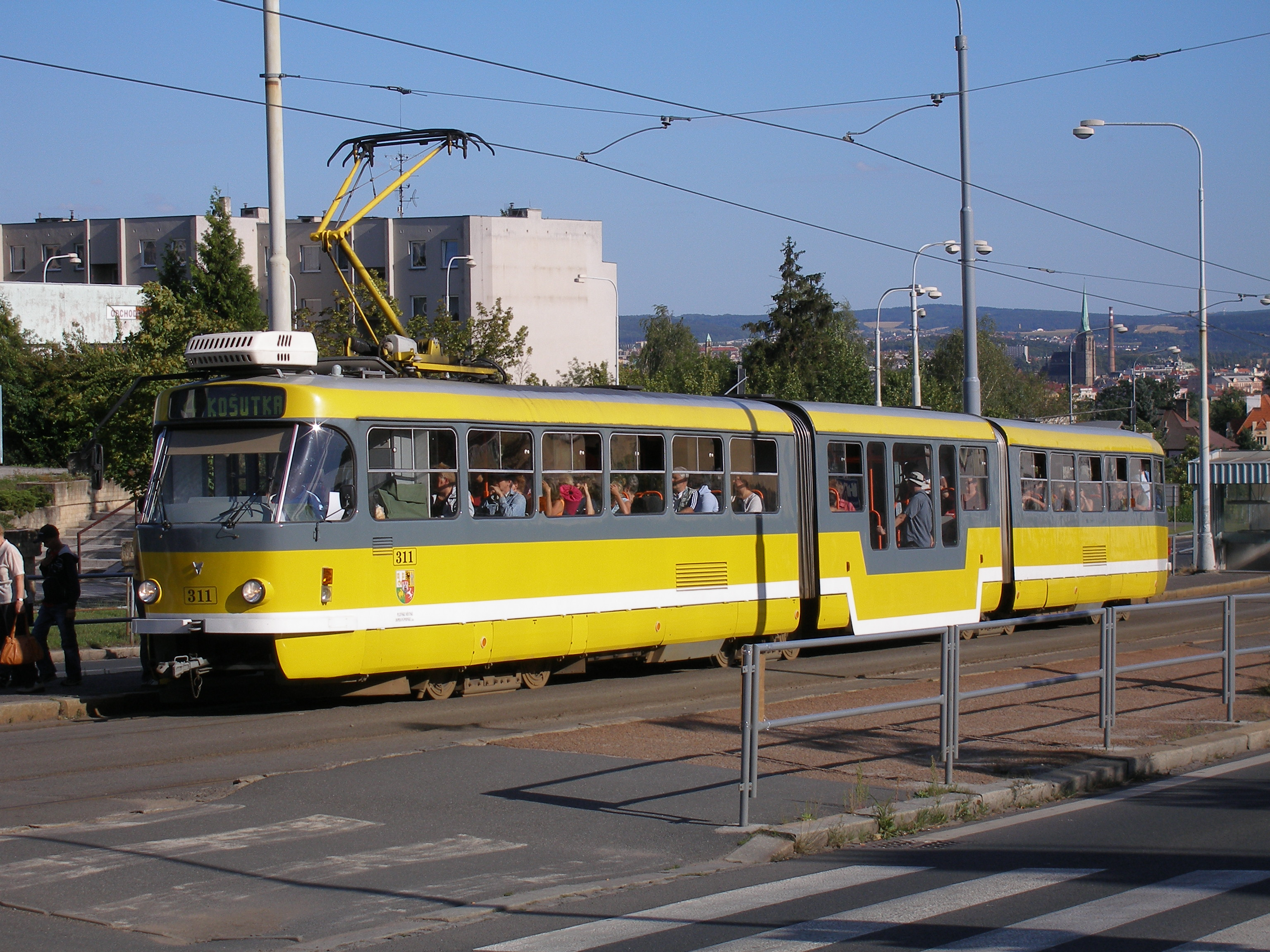
Three-unit tram Tatra K3R-NT in Plzeň, Czech Republic

Derivatives of the T3 include a pair of articulated tram variants, those being the Tatra K3R-NT and Tatra KT3. Both are modified from a pair of older T3 chassis, which were shortened at the middle door, and had a new low-floor segment inserted between them, hung from Jacobs bogies repurposed from the T3. Both of these articulated variants are 28.65m long. Interiors were modernized, electrical equipment was swapped for a new set built by TV Progress, and the KT3 had a new front mask added based on design by Patrik Kotas. The K3R-NT has 54 seats and 140 standing places and includes a deployable platform for wheelchairs in the middle section, while the KT3 has 62 seats and 138 standing places. 4 K3R-NTs were built for Plzeň, while the KT3 is operating in Kyiv (14 units) and Kryvyi Rih (2 units), with one more unit (designated KT3R) being built for Moscow.

=== T3 Coupé ===
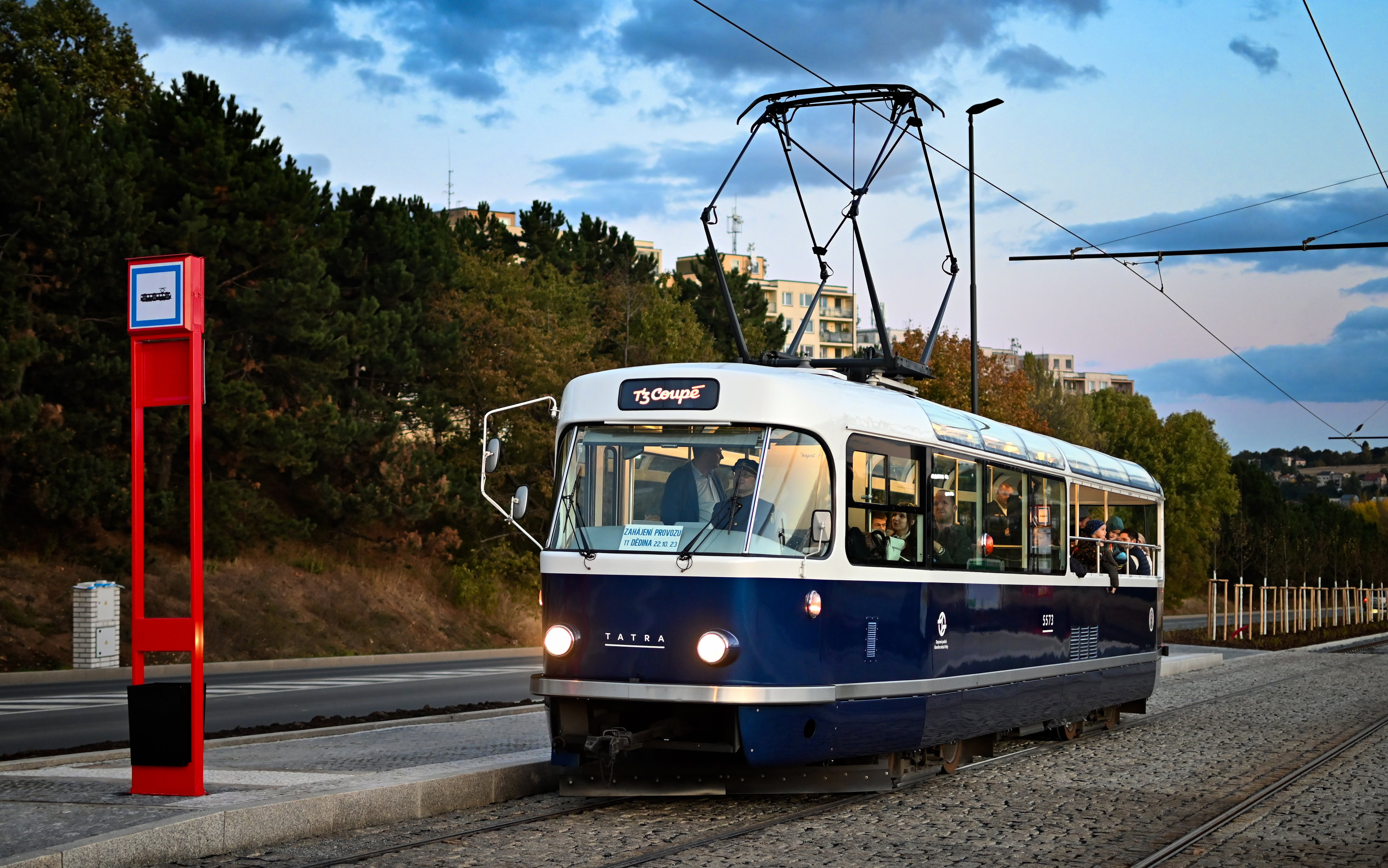
T3 Coupé in Prague

In the year 2017, the Prague Public Transit Company (Czech: Dopravní podnik hl. m. Prahy, DPP) announced the intention to make a special "touring" tram, motivated among other things by the popularity of the lubricating tram. Original intent was to have an open-top car, but it was rejected for safety reasons and to allow all-season use. The final design, called the T3 Coupé is based on the T3 and was created by the atelier of Czech designer Anna Marešová. The design took inspiration from by 1960s designs, in elements like roof windows inspired by the Škoda 706 RTO LUX bus, or a bar counter inspired by the conductor's desk on the Tatra T1. The front contains a bar with laminate seats, and the rear an open "dance floor" and leatherette benches under the windows. Entrance is only through the front doors. The tram is available for specially-ordered commercial trips, intended as social events. It was finished and put into operations in October 2018.

=== B3 trailer ===
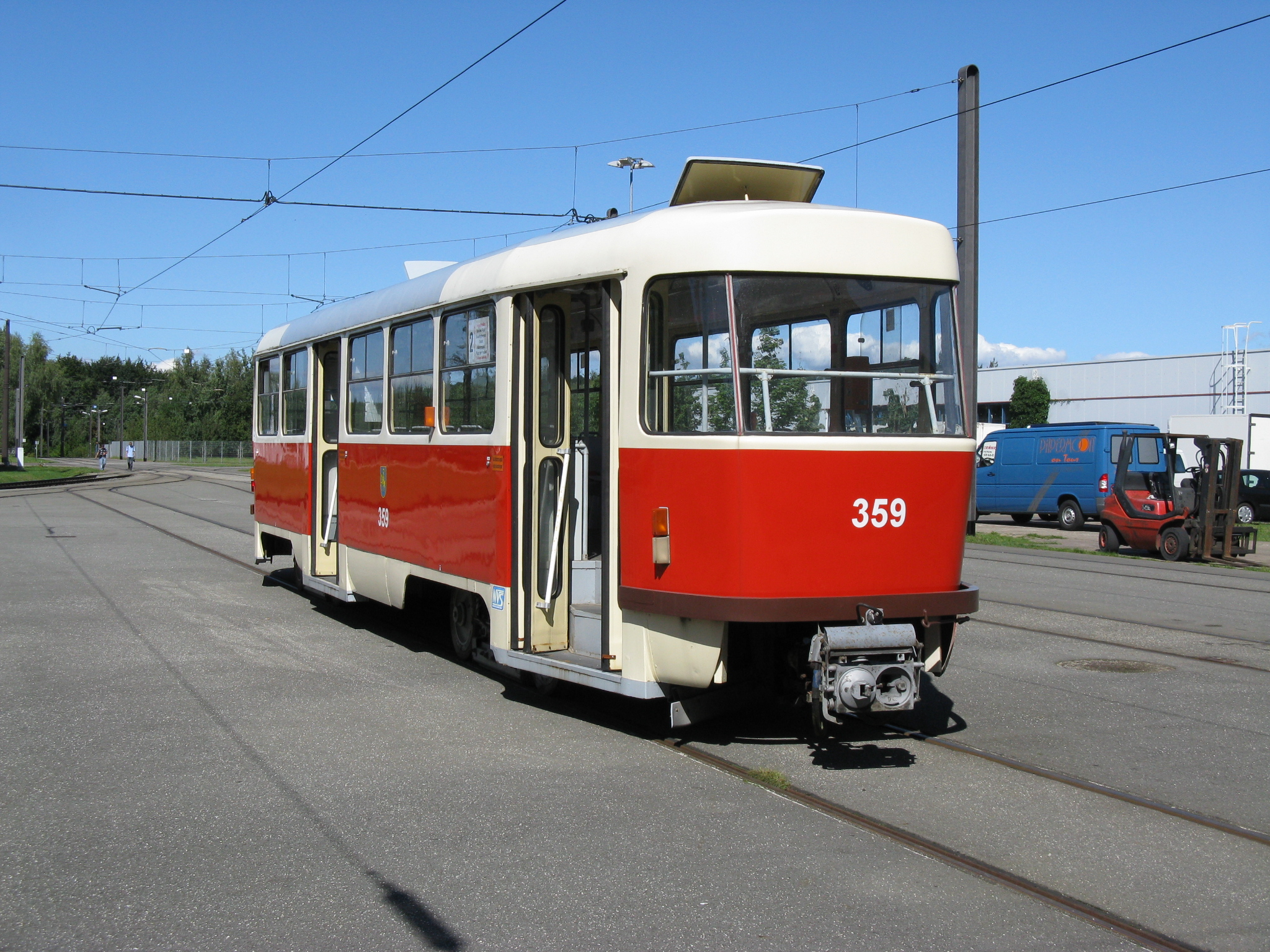
Tatra B3 in Schwerin

A derivative of the T3 tram was the Tatra B3 unpowered trailer, manufactured between 1973 and 1988. The driver's section and headlights were removed and replaced with a seating section, similar to the rear of the tram, for a total of 28 seats and 96 standing places. Motors and pantograph were also removed, with power for heating and lighting instead being supplied from one or two powered units. 4 trailers (labeled B3YU) were supplied to Osijek in Yugoslavia, with the rest (labeled B3D) going to Germany, of which 62 trailers went to Chemnitz and 56 to Schwerin.

=== Utility derivatives ===
The large number of T3s produced has led some transportation companies to reworking some into working vehicles. Probably the most well-known is the Lubricating tram 5572, but there are also others, like the PSP 01 snowplow built from the bogie of a T3 to provide a broader sweep than Prague's older snow-plowing trams (also based on the T3).

== See also ==
- 1978 Košice tram accident
- Lubricating tram 5572 – a maintenance tram based on the T3
- Tatra T4 – a narrower variant with many outward similarities
- Tatra K2 - an articulated tram sharing many components wit the T3
