= Tatra T6A5 =

Czech streetcar

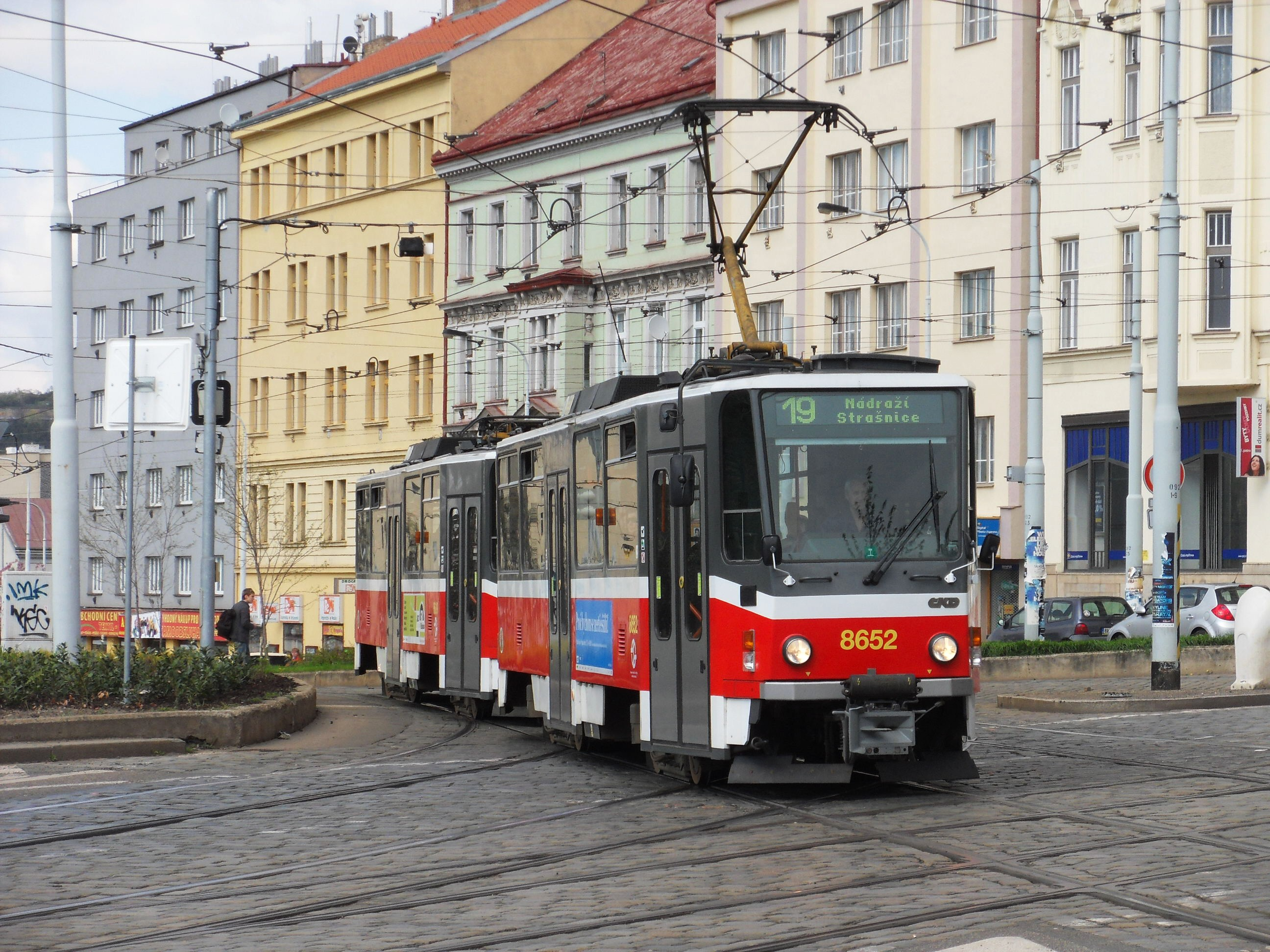
- Coupled Tatra T6A5 trams in Prague

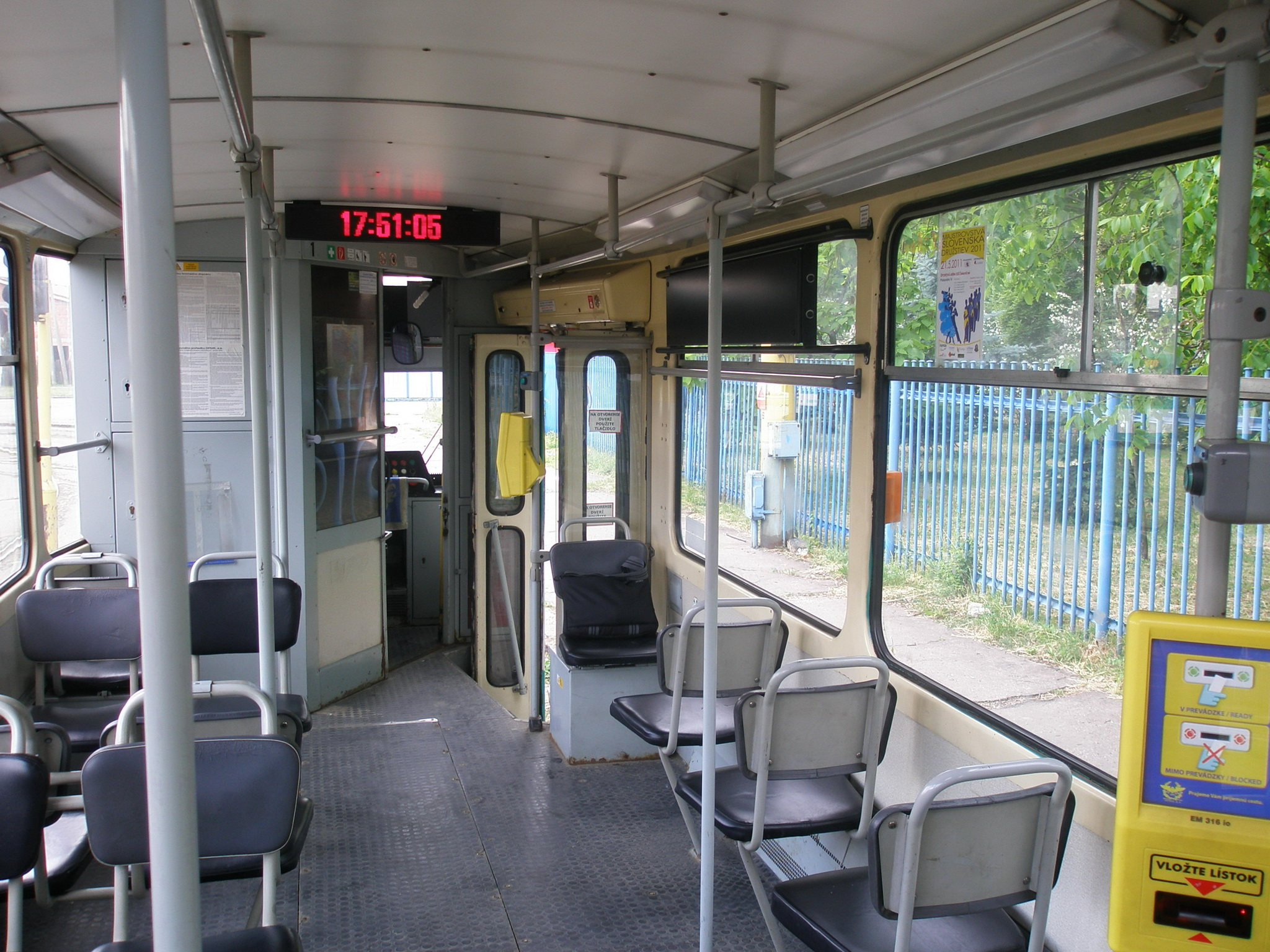
- Interior
- Manufacturer: ČKD Tatra
- Assembly: (Czech Republic) Prague
- Family name: Tatra
- Constructed: 1991–1998
- Number built: 296 + 1 body
- Predecessor: Tatra T3
- Capacity: 100 / 105

Specifications
- Car length: 14,700 mm (48 ft 3 in)
- Width: 2,500 mm (8 ft 2 in)
- Height: 3,165 mm (10 ft 4.6 in)
- Doors: 3
- Maximum speed: 65 km/h (40 mph)
- Weight: 18,700 kg (41,200 lb)
- Engine type: TE 023, TE 026A02
- Traction motors: 4
- Power output: 4×45
- Electric system: 600 V DC
- Current collection: pantograph
- Wheels driven: 4
- Bogies: 2
- Coupling system: +GF+ Type T
- Track gauge: 1,435 mm (4 ft 8 1/2 in)

Tatra T6A5 is a unidirectional high-floor Czech streetcar made for public transport in Europe and is one sub-type of T6 standard trams made by Czech light rail supplier Tatra ČKD in Prague. Five cities, namely Bratislava, Košice in Slovakia and Brno, Prague and Ostrava in Czech Republic operate them in various configurations and amounts. The vehicle was designed as successor to Tatra T3 which has been operated in Europe for more than three decades at the time T6A5 was launched. The launch customer was Dopravný podnik Bratislava which received the first set of two vehicles in 1991. Brno, Bratislava, Ostrava and Košice still operate their originally ordered trams, while the fleet in Prague began retiring in 2015. They are commonly called "Irons" by general public and operator employees because their design resembles the triangular surface of clothing irons when seen from larger height.

Although T6A5 is operated exclusively in Czech Republic and Slovakia, there are several different versions operated in other states in Continental Europe and some efforts had been made also to operate these vehicles in North America.

== History ==
During the early 1980s, new requirements were set by European light rail operators for new vehicles, which would feature lower operating costs and easier maintenance. At the time, Tatra ČKD engineers were already working on new concepts of design and controls that would replace almost 30-year-old Tatra T3 dominating the tram fleet in many European cities.

The T6 model range was introduced with T6B5 in 1983, which has been made mostly for Russian and Ukrainian operators. Tatra T6B5 featured electronic controls and completely new design. Tatra T6A2 launched in 1985 was redesigned to meet requirements for German and Hungarian operators. Vehicle remained technically same but was made considerably smaller to better suit the operation in Germany due to their much narrower streets and less space between rails. To bridge the differences between the two, Tatra T6A5 was developed which was not as large and heavy as T6B5 but not as small as T6A2. German cities Schwerin, Chemnitz were considering T6A5 for fleet restoration.

The last order for T6A5 was filled in 1998, although vehicle remained in offering until ČKD ceased operations in 2002. 296 vehicles and one replacement chassis were made since 1991.

On 27 December 2005, two vehicles were sold to Bratislava. These two trams were manufactured in 1997 and were used for testing purposes in Prague where they remained until 11 May 2004 when they were acquired by rail engineering company Pars Nova a.s. in Šumperk, where they undergone major refurbishment and re-painting to new livery used by third revision vehicles in Bratislava. Continuous service began on 13 December 2006 and both vehicles are coupled into one set. They now carry registration numbers #7957 and #7958 and slightly differ from rest of the fleet due to different front and rear coupler.

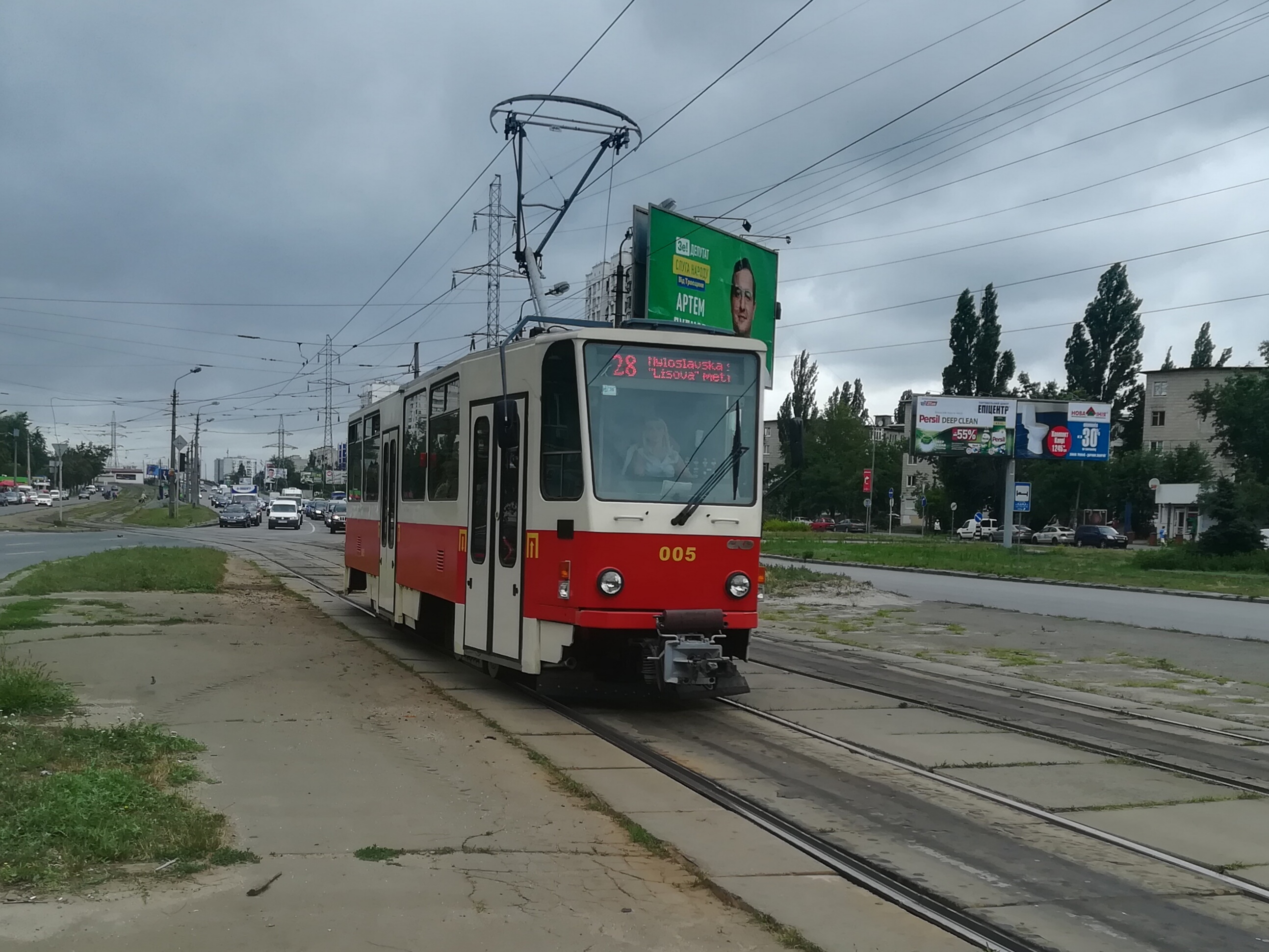
A Tatra T6A5 in Kyiv in 2019

More than half of the 296 trams, namely 150 copies, were between 1995 and 1997 to the Prague City Transport Authority (DPP) delivered. The vehicles were already conceptually and technically outdated when they were commissioned. Between April 2016 and June 2019, 40 ex-Prague T6A5/III trams were delivered to Sofia, Bulgaria, where they underwent an upgrade to their visual and acoustic information systems. Some of them also underwent major refurbishment. Trams retired from Prague were also sent to Kharkiv, Kyiv and Kamianske in Ukraine.

In the spring of 2021 there were just three T6A5 in the Czech capital in regular service to be found, mainly in night traffic and on lines 20 and 21. This era ended on 18. June 2021 - the Tw 8637 made its last lap with an early course on line 21. Since 2022 two T6A5 have been occasionally used on the retro line 23.

== Design and construction ==
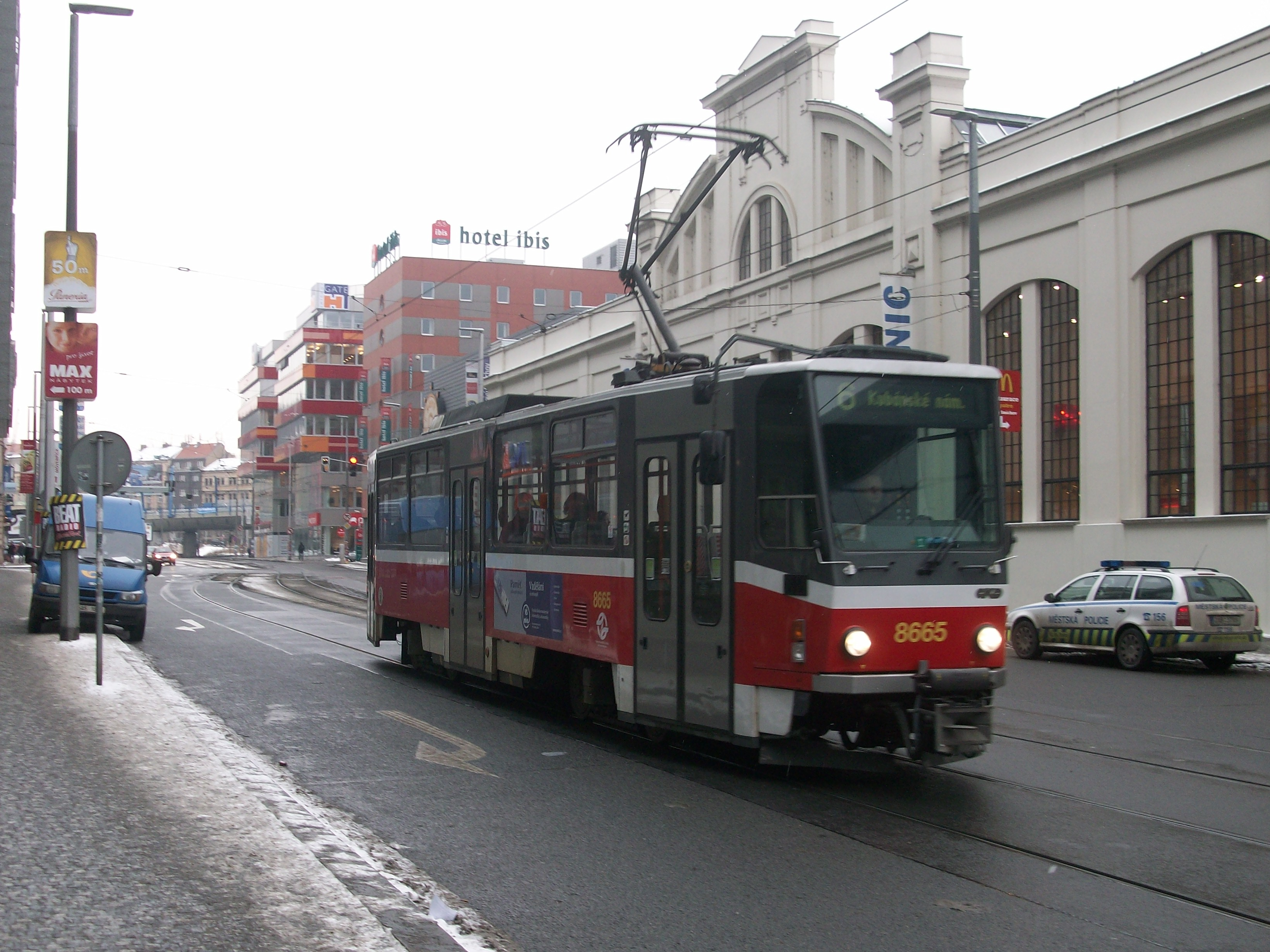
Third revision featured new doors, interior and livery

Vehicle has angular steel construction with large windows, 3 collapsible doors on the right side and is painted with red-cream livery.

Interior was fitted with leather seats, rubber anti-slide floor and was universally made with cream window frames and gray roof and floor.

Chassis is mounted on two bogies, has four axles and every axle is connected to one traction motor. Traction motors are controlled via pulse converters. Current collection from trolley wire is done via pantograph. Construction of bogies used for T6A5 is based on North American PCC standard.

== Operation ==
T6A5 can drive as solo vehicle or can be coupled in to train set from two or three cars. Two-car sets and solo vehicles are always used, Three-car sets are used very rarely, mostly for testing purposes. Tram sets are connected with electric couplers and only one pantograph is used for powering the entire set.

Maximum design speed is 65 km/h (40 mph). At the start of operation in Bratislava and Košice, speeds as high as 115 km/h (71 mph) were achieved during special tests. But due to poor track maintenance and condition, they don't drive faster than 50 km/h (31 mph). Only exception is light rail line to U.S. Steel factory in the outskirts of Košice, where all trams, not just T6A5, drive at 60 km/h (37 mph) which is maximum speed for this area.

Information system contains front, side, back and internal panel.

== Production ==
Country	City	Type	Delivery years	Number	Fleet numbers
Czech Republic	Brno	T6A5	1995/6 and 2019/20	50	1201–1248
Czech Republic	Ostrava	T6A5	1994 – 1998	38	1101–1138
Czech Republic	Prague	T6A5	1995 – 1997	150	8601–8750
Czech Republic		replacement chassis	1998	1	8600
Slovakia	Bratislava	T6A5	1991 – 2006	58	7901-7958
Slovakia	Košice	T6A5	1992 – 1993	30	600–629
Total:297			1991-006		

Note: This is the list of first owners. Stock may have later been resold to other cities not on this list.

== Development ==
Since its debut, T6A5 was made in three versions, most changes made were minor and were mostly visual as vehicle's electronics and mechanics remained unchanged.

First revision

The First revision (noted as T6A5/I) is the oldest revision, featuring red-cream livery and classic gray-cream colored interior.

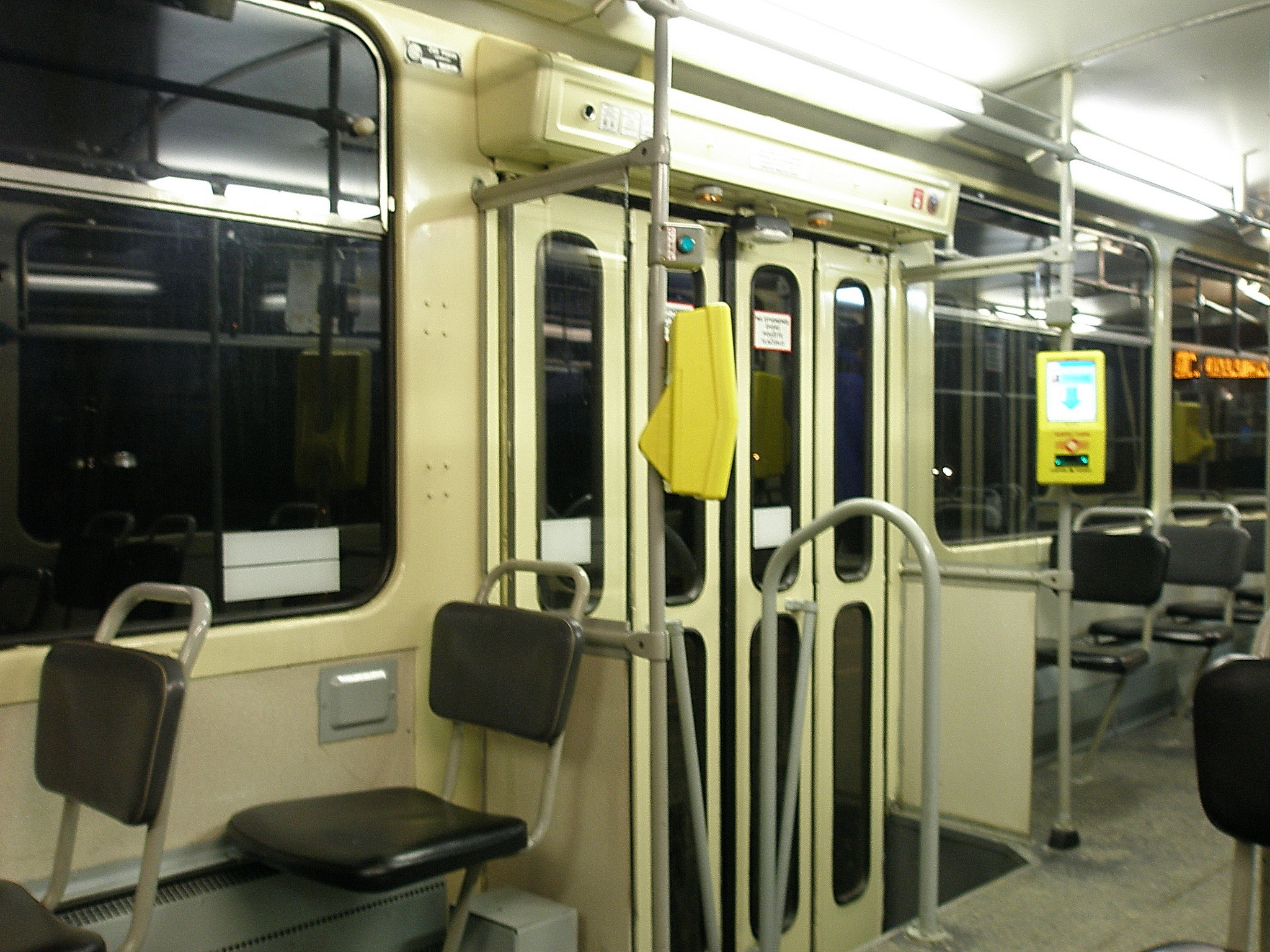
Interior Design in T6A5

Second revision

Second revision (noted as T6A5/II) is minor revision and only featured improved wheel slide protection, different pantograph and tilt sash windows.

Third revision

Third revision (noted as T6A5/III) saw renewed livery, redesigned interior, doors, driver's air conditioning, plastic seats with textile coating, new pantograph and electronic information displays.

T6A5.3

The T6A5.3 is modification of classic Tatra T3 to T6A5 using new replacement chassis and old parts and bogies from T3. This was an experiment in Prague made to find a cheaper ways to restore fleet. Only one vehicle of this kind was built in 1998, but due to its atypical origin, it was not operated in regular service because of low reliability. In August 2012 the vehicle was scrapped.

== Operation in North America ==
ČKD attempted to enter United States market when New Orleans Regional Transit Authority, public transport operator in New Orleans, Louisiana proven interest in T6A5 in the late 1990s, but due to several atypical properties of New Orleans streetcar system, such as rail gauge, trolley wires and customer's requirements, T6A5 had to be heavily modified to meet them. As a result, Tatra T6C5 was developed which was bi-directional, had pair of doors on both sides, air conditioning and alongside pantograph, the pair of trolley poles installed on both ends of the vehicle. Only one unit was built in 1998 and has been tested in New Orleans between 1999 and 2001. American operators were satisfied with the vehicle but due to upcoming bankruptcy of ČKD they canceled the order and returned the vehicle to Europe. In 2003, T6C5 was sold to Strausberg, Germany where it remains in operation as of today.

== Accidents and incidents ==
On 19 January 2009 in Košice, the two-car set #618+619 had an accident with rigid truck on railway crossing followed with derailment and hitting several utility poles, the vehicle has been heavily damaged and has been withdrawn from the service, few passengers were injured. Vehicle No. 619 was repaired and returned to service.

On 1 September 2008 in Prague, #8671 was hit by an ambulance when entering the light rail depot, there were no injuries and vehicle was withdrawn from the service since then.

On 19 September 2011 in Prague, the two-car set #8697+8698 crashed in high speed to Škoda 14 T standing at the tram stop. All three vehicles were removed from the service and accident left one fatality, the driver of T6A5. Investigation shown that driver's health problems were most likely to cause the accident.

== See also ==
- Tatra T3
- Tatra T6A2
- Tatra T6B5
- ČKD
- Tatra KT8D5
- Trams in Prague
