= Lubricating tram 5572 =

Czech work tram

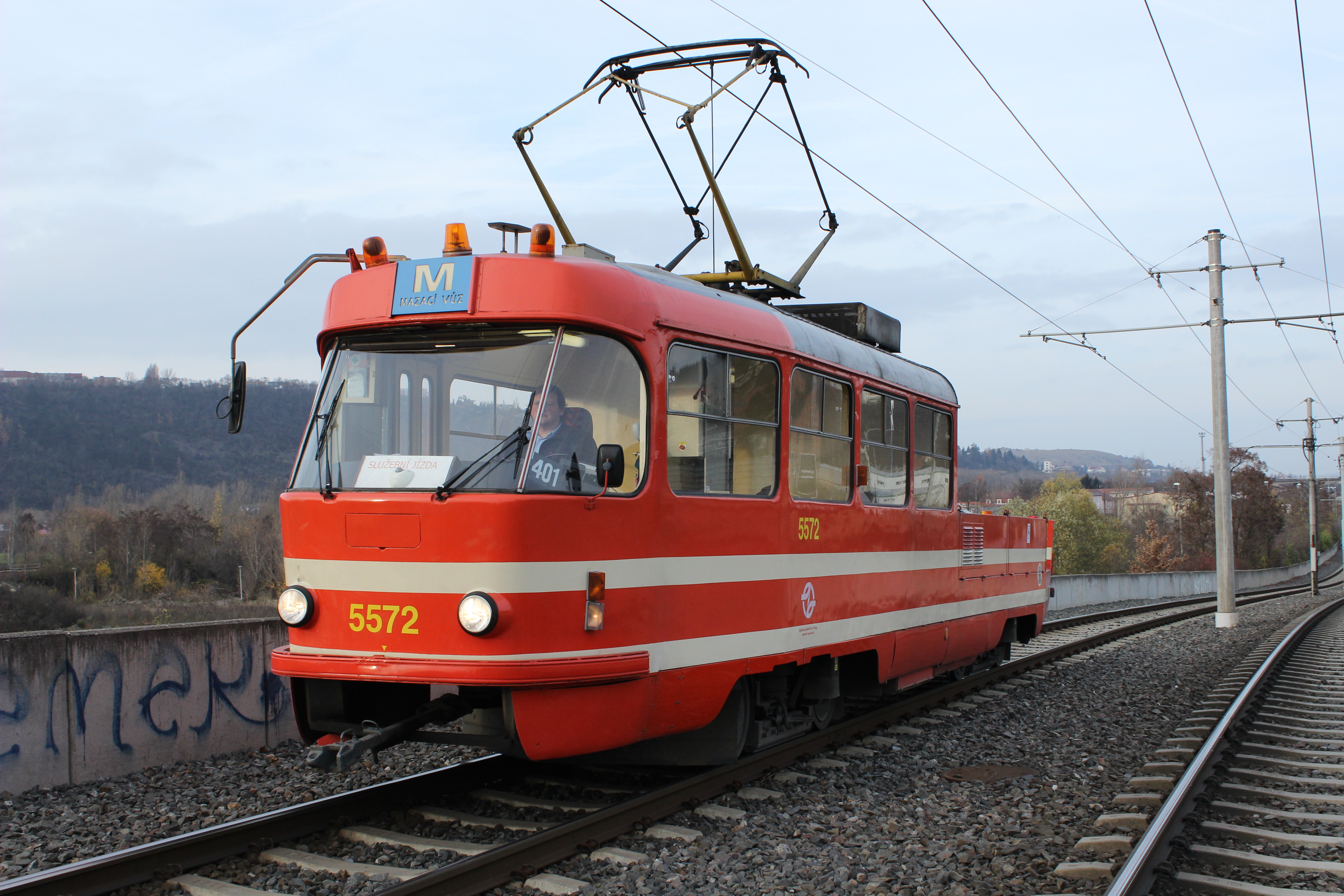
- The tram passing by in 2015
- Stock type: Electric multiple unit
- Manufacturer: ČKD Tatra
- Designer: František Kardaus
- Built at: Tatra Smíchov plant
- Constructed: 1965, rebuilt 1990
- Entered service: 1965
- Number built: 1
- Number in service: 1
- Fleet numbers: 5572; 6498 (original)

Specifications
- Car length: 14,000 mm (46 ft)
- Width: 2,500 mm (8.2 ft)
- Height: 3,050 mm (10.01 ft)
- Doors: 2
- Power output: 4×44 kW

Lubricating tram 5572 (Czech: mazací tramvaj 5572), also called mazačka, originally designated Tram 6498, is a working tram from the Czech Republic based on the Tatra T3. It has been used to lubricate the rails in the Prague tram network since 2015. The car was manufactured in 1965 as a Tatra T3, registered with the number 6948. The tram subsequently operated with passengers until 1990. It was then converted into a freight tram, during which the body was shortened and a cargo area was created in the remaining space. Since 2004, the car has also been equipped with a snow plow to clear snow on the tram line from Hlubočepy to Barrandov in the southern part of Prague. During 2014, the tram received a lubrication device that applies a layer of special lubricant to the rails. After testing in January 2015 proved successful, 5572 began full operation as a lubricating tram on 2 February 2015. The tram received various upgrades after being approved for operation, including a water tank in 2016 and dust particle-detecting sensors in 2017. 5572 has received critical acclaim; a Facebook group was founded about it, a song was written for it, and a live television broadcast displayed the tram.

== Original design ==
When 5572 was delivered as 6498 in 1965, it was a Tatra T3 tram. The T3's appearance was designed by František Kardaus. The lower part of the tram is made of a lightweight welded steel profile and sheet metal. The tram body consists of columns, which are additionally reinforced in their lower part by longitudinal struts. The cladding of this structure is made of steel sheets. Self-extinguishing fiberglass is used on the front walls of the tram. The floor of the car is made of reinforced moisture-resistant plywood, on which a grooved rubber carpet with a non-slip surface is also glued. The side glass windows of the tram are mounted in rubber profiles, while the upper parts of the windows on both sides of the tram are sliding. The walls in the tram saloon are covered in the lower parts under the windows with a layer of Umakart. Above it, they are protected by paint. The car was accessed through three four-part folding doors, whose width reached 1,343 millimetres (4.406 feet).

There were three roof flaps in the tram. In addition to these, it was also possible to ventilate by opening the sliding parts of the windows. In the driver's cabin, ventilation is provided by slots located above the windshield. Heating is provided by electric heaters installed in the seat posts. The driver's seat is heated by its own unit located under the tram. The length of the tram over the couplers is 15,200 millimetres (49.9 feet), while the car body itself is 14,000 millimetres (46 feet) long. Its width is 2,500 millimetres (8.2 feet) and the height of the roof above the rails is 3,050 millimetres (10.01 feet). Inside the car there were 25 seats and 75 standing places. The tram is powered by four TE 022 traction motors, each with an output of 44 kW, manufactured by the ČKD Praha company.

== Service ==
=== As a passenger tram ===
Tatra T3 6498 was manufactured in 1965 at the Tatra Smíchov plant, and became part of the Prague Public Transport Company's fleet that same year. It was placed in the Motol depot. The tram was pulled out of passenger service in 1990.

=== As a freight tram ===
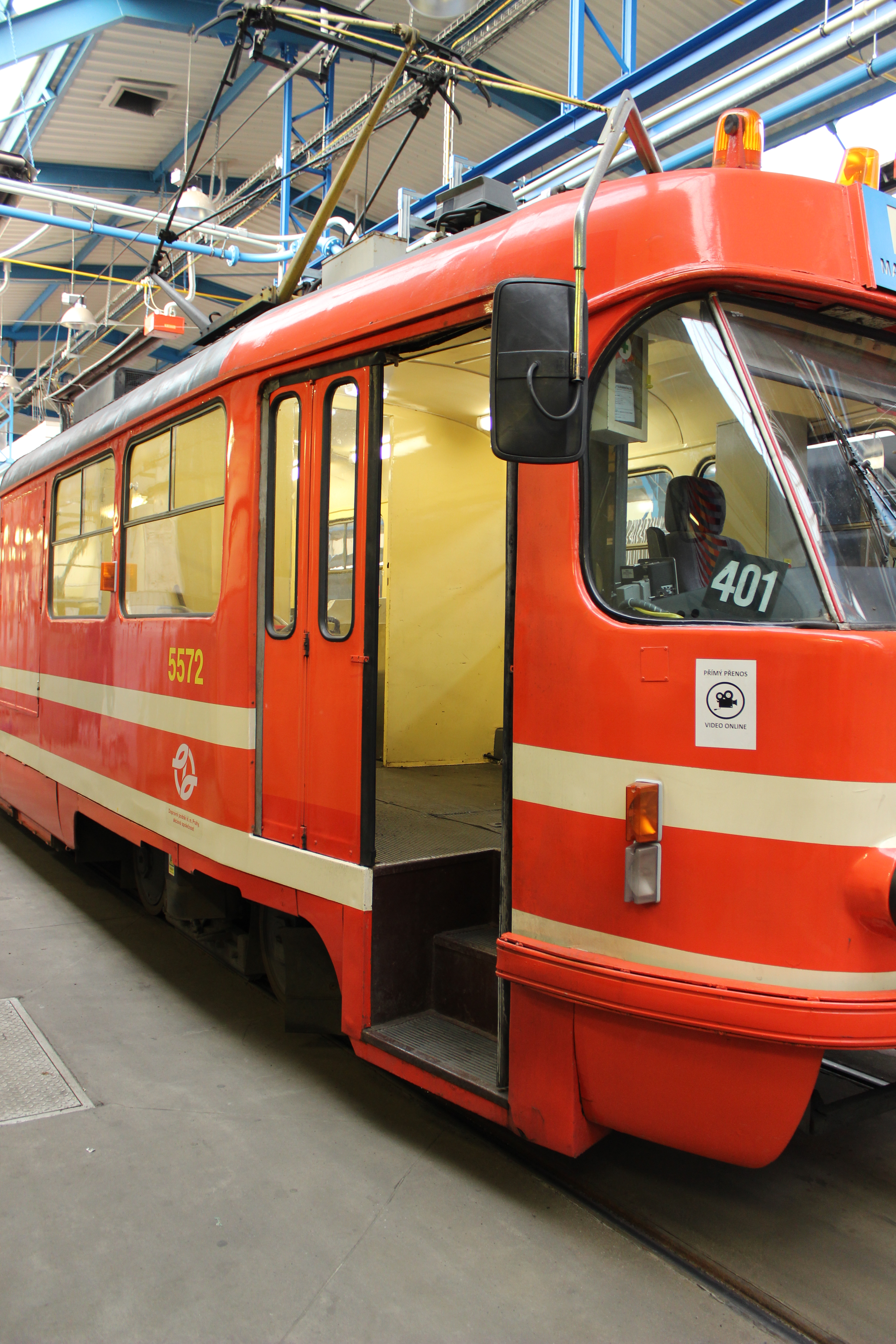
During the installation of a snow plow on the tram, the left wing of the front door was shortened.

Between 1990 and 1991, the Central Workshops of the Prague Transport Company converted 6498 into a freight tram. After the conversion, the car had a closed cabin in the front and a loading area in the rear. A hydraulic arm, which was designated HR 3001, was manufactured by the Trnava branch of the Bratislava Automobile Works and installed on the rear platform. The hydraulic arm was used for handling heavy objects. To prevent it from touching the trolley, the arm was equipped with a sensor that responded when the distance between the arm and the tram fell below one metre (three feet three inches). In addition, the car was given side support legs to ensure greater stability. The electrical equipment of the tram was also modified to allow for long-term slow travel, because the tram had outdated electrical equipment for acceleration and deceleration.

Because of the electrical upgrades, the tram was also re-typed from T3 to T3M. In 1995, the car was transferred to the Pankrác depot, where local employees removed the hydraulic arm, which had by then lost the necessary permits for hydraulic arms. (Note: The dismantling of the hydraulic crane was also influenced by the adoption of the Railways Act No. 266/1994 Coll., the requirements of which the equipment no longer met.) Moreover, the arm did not have the same purpose as originally intended. A snow plow was installed on 5572 in 2004 to clear snow on the Hlubočepy—Barrandov tram line. The left wing of the front door was shortened during the installation, however the tram continued to be used throughout the year for transporting materials and for pulling other trams.

=== As a lubricating tram ===
In an effort to address noise complaints about the squeaking of trams, of which the Škoda 15T type trams emitted the most intense sound, a lubricant was introduced in the Pankrác depot in March 2014, which was applied to the tops of the rails. The lubricant could also be used on the parts of the rails the trams touch when driving through a curve. When 5572 was chosen for testing, the necessary equipment was placed in its interior. The tram conversion was carried out by Sklenář in collaboration with the Swiss company Igralub AG. Testing done with similar equipment from Igralub AG at the GVB transport company in Gera, Germany was helpful for the installation. The installation took place in August 2014 and was followed by tests of the equipment along with modifications to the electrical equipment related to the lubrication technology. The costs for the Transport Company before the tram started operating with the equipment amounted to 30,000 Czech Koruna and represented investments in the modification of the tram and the actual installation of the equipment. During its trial operation, the company only paid for the applied mixture.

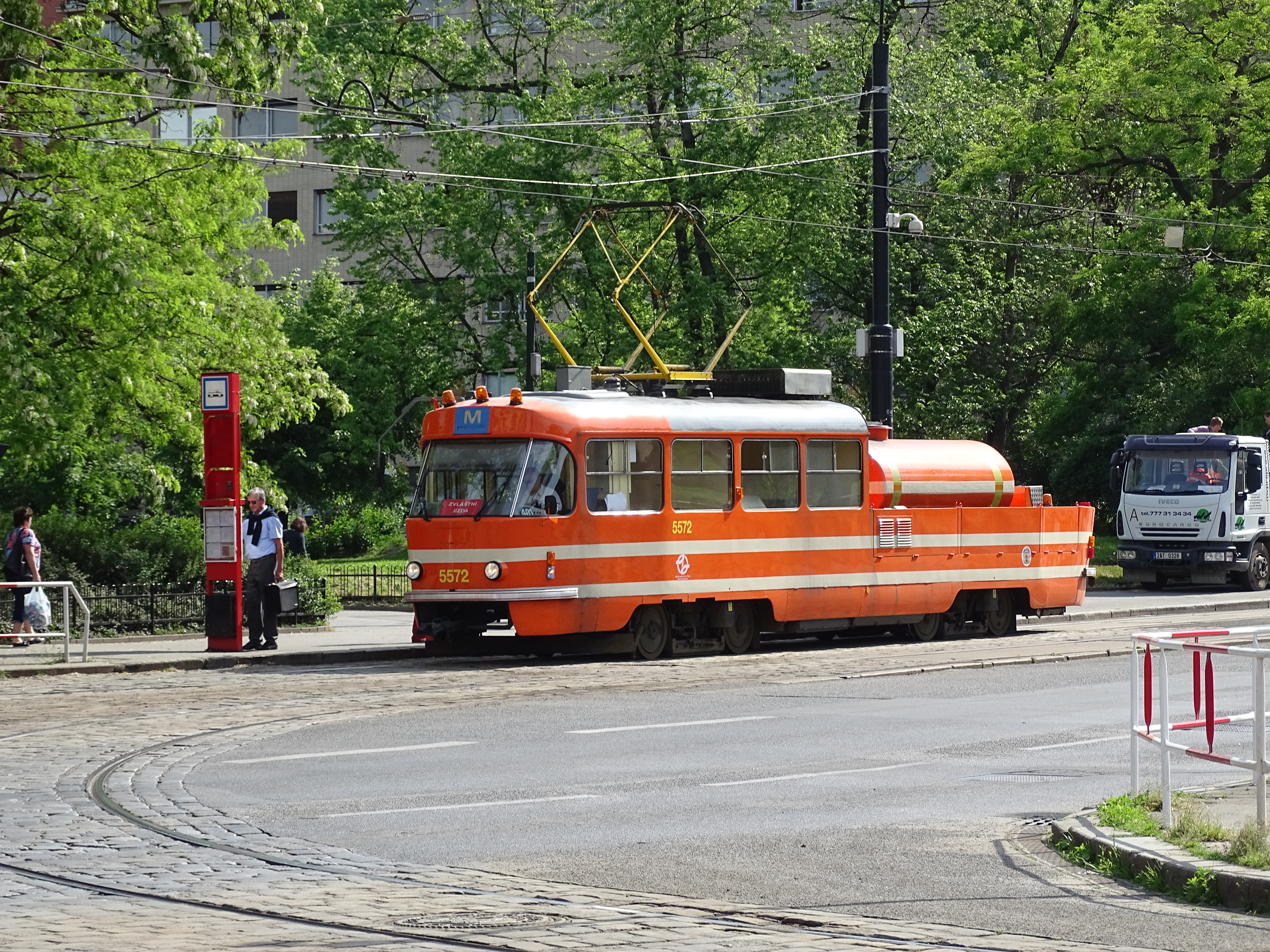
The tram has been fitted with a water tank since 2016.

In January 2015, the tram was approved by the Railway Authority and, since 2 February of the same year, it has been running regularly according to the timetable; with daily runs between four in the morning and one hour after midnight the following day. 5572 spends every night at the Pankrác depot and receives daily treatment and replenishment of the lubricating mixture that is applied to the tram tracks. The lubricant is distributed under the trade name "Head Lub 90", and can be applied at temperatures ranging from -30 to +100 °C and it is not affected by rain or snow. 5572 travels a route of 200–250 kilometres (120–160 miles), covering 140 kilometres (87 miles) of tram line per day, which is about 6,000 kilometres (3,700 miles) per month. During this period it uses about fifty kilograms (110 lb) of lubricating mixture, i.e. approximately two kilograms (4.4 lb) per day. The tram lubricates about 15% of the total distance traveled. Testing at the curve on Na Veselí and Soudní streets near Pankrác prison proved successful. Testing of the lubrication in January showed that noise intensity from the passage of a 15T tram was reduced from 86 dB to 61 dB.

At the end of 2016, a water tank was added to the tram's loading area to sprinkle grassy tracks. The tank was made of plastic and could hold 5,000 litres (1,100 imperial gallons; 1,300 US gallons) of liquid. The tank was 3.7 metres (12 feet) long, 1.4 metres (4.6 feet) wide, and 1.5 metres (4.9 feet) high. To prevent the liquid from endangering the stability of the tram, slosh baffles were installed inside the tank. In addition, a 2.4-metre (7.9-foot)-long sprinkler bar was added to the back of the tram. At the same time that the water tank was added, the tram underwent a reconstruction, during which the body was reinforced, stainless steel sheets were added to the platform, the area of the front entrance to the tram was modified, and parts of the tram's electrical equipment were also renewed. In the spring of 2017, the tram was equipped with a sensor that monitors the concentration and the presence of dust particles in the air, along with the ambient temperature. The sensors were installed on the vehicle by the Prague Public Transport Company in cooperation with the Kanarci.cz project.

== Cultural impact ==
The lubricating tram became a phenomenon in 2015. During the summer of 2015, Facebook user Eva Holická founded a group that brings together fans of the tram. At the beginning of November 2015, the group had almost 8,000 followers. The members inform each other about where the tram has traveled in the past, and add photos (or selfies) of the tram. Holická planned to prepare a collection of items during the summer holidays that featured the cartoon motif of the tram. In early September 2015, the Pelhřimov band 2MS, consisting of Jakub Marek and Hana Minářů as members, released a song called "Mazací". The lyrics sing praises of the lubrication tram and also mentions its driver Aleš Fořt. In the middle of September 2015, the Mafra company prepared a live broadcast of the lubrication tram on its internet television network Playtvak.cz. Therefore, the company installed a camera on the tram that allows filming in HD format even during the night. Its recording is transmitted to the internet broadcast. By the end of October 2015, it had been watched by more than 250,000 viewers.

== Works cited ==
- Linert, Stanislav; Fojtík, Pavel (2005). "Evidenční čísla zařazovaných a vyřazovaných tramvají 1897–2004" [Registration numbers of trams introduced and withdrawn 1897–2004]. Kolejová vozidla pražské městské hromadné dopravy [Urban Prague transport rolling stock] (1 ed.). Prague, Czech Republic: Dopravní podnik hlavního města Prahy. ISBN 80-239-5463-6.
- Chrást, Michal (February 2015). "Kdo maže, ten jede. A potichu" [Whoever lubricates, drives. And quietly] (PDF). DP kontakt (in Czech). Vol. 20, no. 2. ISSN 1212-6349.
- Linert, Stanislav (1996). "Motorový nákladní vůz" [Motor truck]. Vozidla pražské tramvajové dopravy [Prague transport tram vehicles] (1 ed.). Prague, Czech Republic: Nakladatelství dopravy a turistiky. ISBN 80-85884-58-5.
- Chrást, Michal (January 2015). "Zařízení ke snížení hluku" [Noise reduction equipment] (PDF). DP kontakt (in Czech). Vol. 20, no. 1. ISSN 1212-6349.
- Maruna, Zdeněk (1974). "Přehled tramvajových vozidel dodaných Dopravním podnikům (dříve Elektrickým podnikům) hlavního města Prahy v letech 1918–1972" [Overview of tram vehicles delivered to the Transport Companies (formerly the Electric Companies) of the Capital City of Prague in the years 1918–1972]. Modely tramvajových vozidel [Tram vehicle models] (in Czech) (1 ed.). Prague, Czech Republic: Nakladatelství dopravy a spojů.
- Ivanov, Mikhail D.; Ponomarev, Aleksandr A.; Ieropolsky, Boris K. (1977). "Obshchiye svedeniya o tramvaynom vagone T-3" Общие сведения о трамвайном вагоне Т-3 [General information about the T-3 tram car]. In Roguleva, N. A. (ed.). Tramvaynyye vagony T3 Трамвайные вагоны ТЗ [T3 tram cars] (PDF) (in Russian). Moscow, Russia: Transport.

== See also ==
- Media related to Tram 5572 (Prague) at Wikimedia Commons
