= Tatra KT8D5R.N2 =

Czech tram model

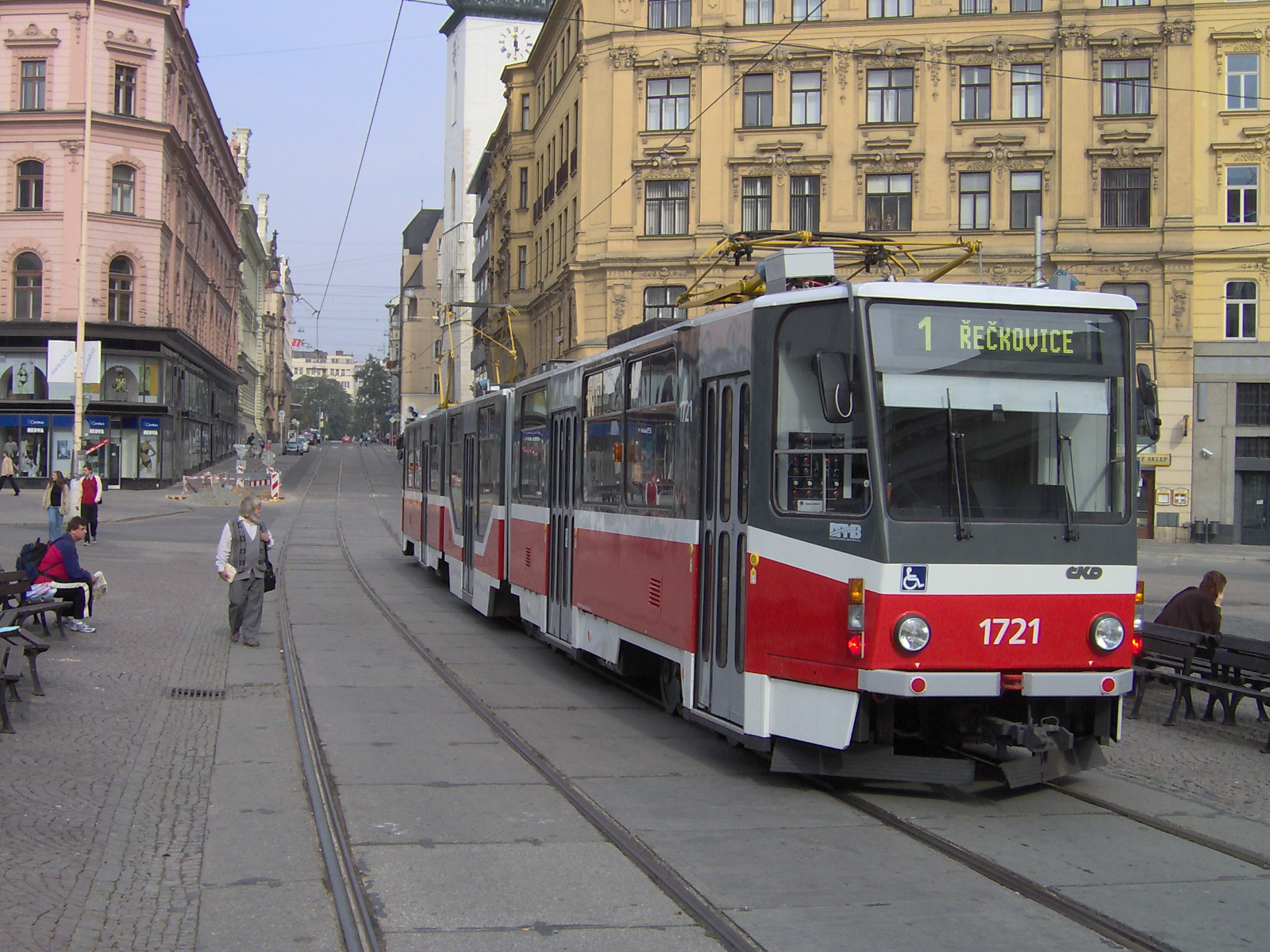
- Tatra KT8D5 tram modernized to KT8D5R.N2 with a low-floor section in Brno
- Manufacturer: ČKD Tatra Smíchov
- Capacity: 56 seated, 171 standing (5 passengers/m²)

Specifications
- Car length: 30,300 mm (99 ft 5 in) (without couplers)
- Width: 2,480 mm (8 ft 2 in)
- Height: 3,145 mm (10 ft 3.8 in)
- Maximum speed: 65 km/h (40 mph)
- Weight: 38,500 kg (38.5 t)
- Traction motors: 8 × 47.5 kW
- Electric system: 600 V DC
- Current collection: Pantograph
- Track gauge: 1,435 mm (4 ft 8 1/2 in)

Tatra KT8D5R.N2 is a reconstruction of the bidirectional tram Tatra KT8D5 and Tatra KT8D5SU (Soviet Union). They were being reconstructed between 2002 and 2014 in Brno and Košice between 2003 and 2009. This reconstruction featured a newly added low-floor section ML8LF.

== Specifications ==
A major change in KT8D5R.N2 was the low-floor middle section, and the other changes were a different roof (only in Brno), orange bars, the original equipment Thyristor-based TV3 was kept. As the first and the oldest modernization, it has also kept Pedals and even the old Seats. Some KT8D5R.N2 in Brno have modern doors while most of them have kept the old doors.

The former KT8D5SU have Retained the Soviet "Beak", however in 1728 B Section is Regular.

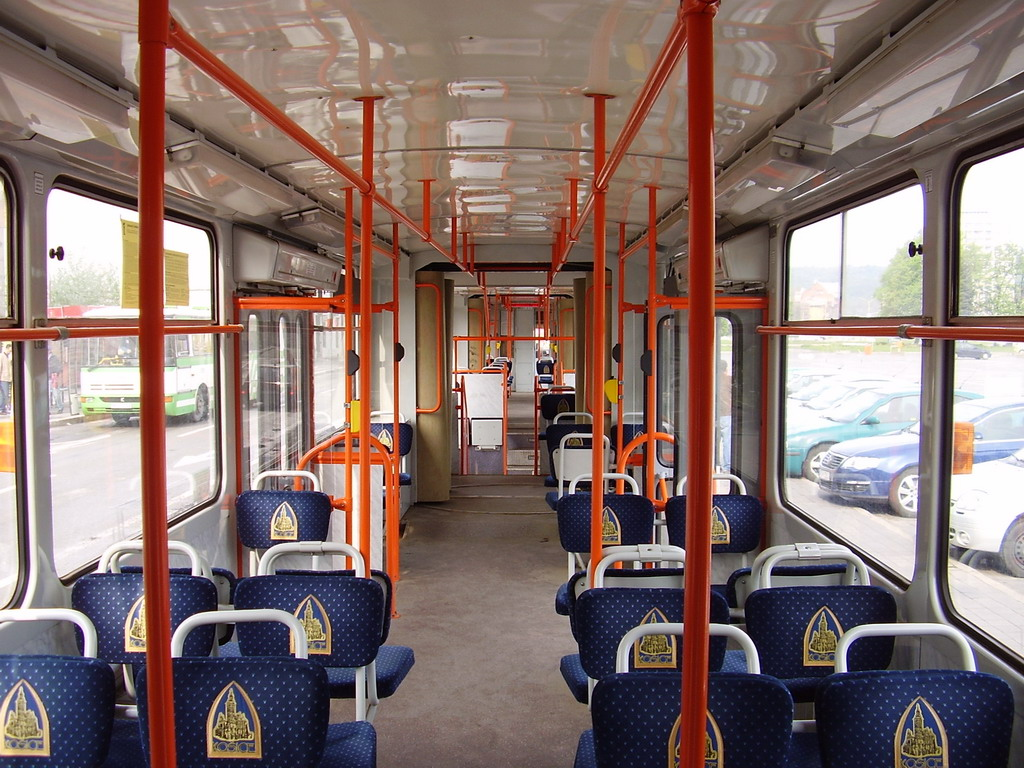
Interior of KT8D5R.N2

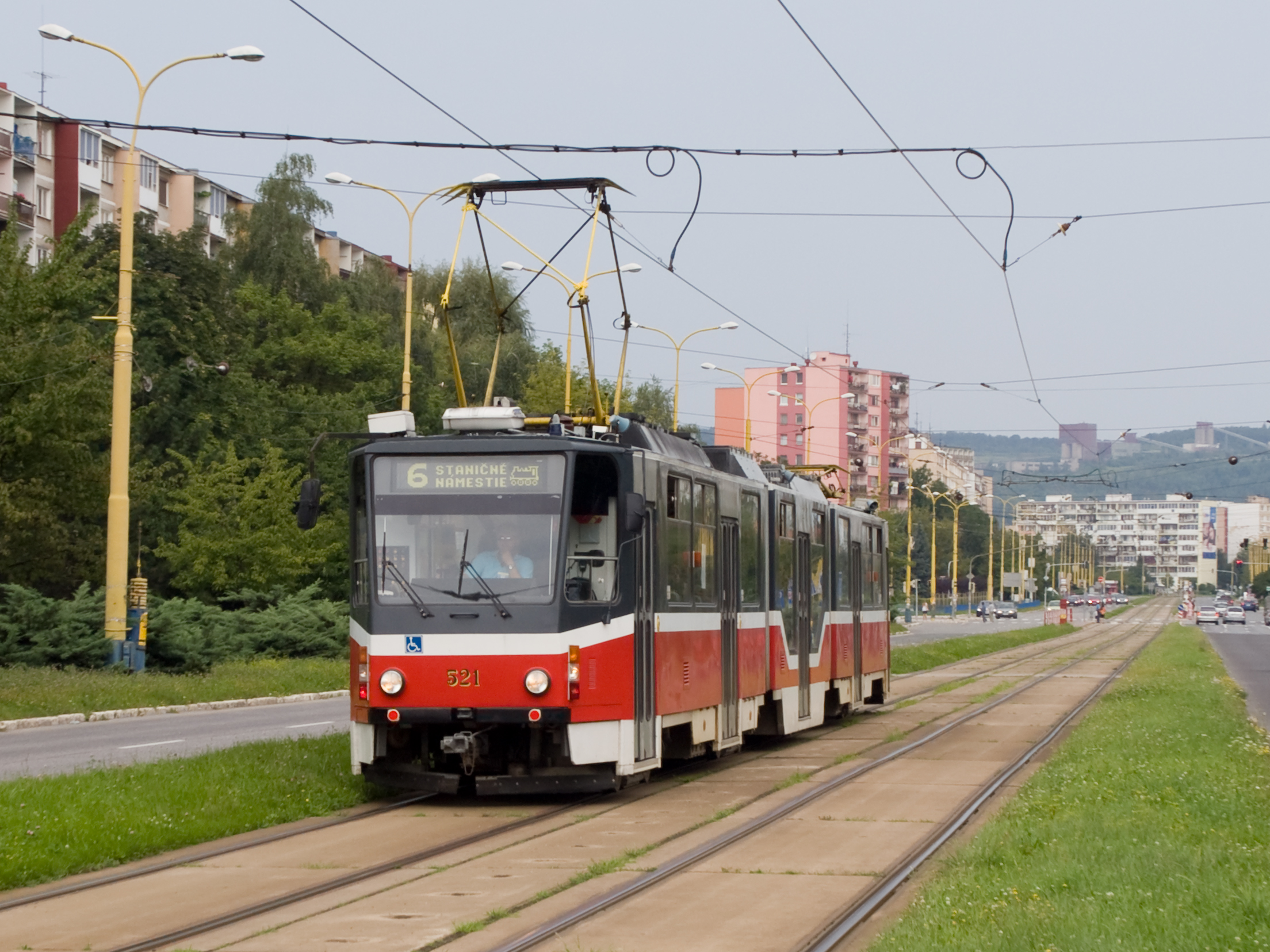
Tatra KT8D5R.N2 in Košice

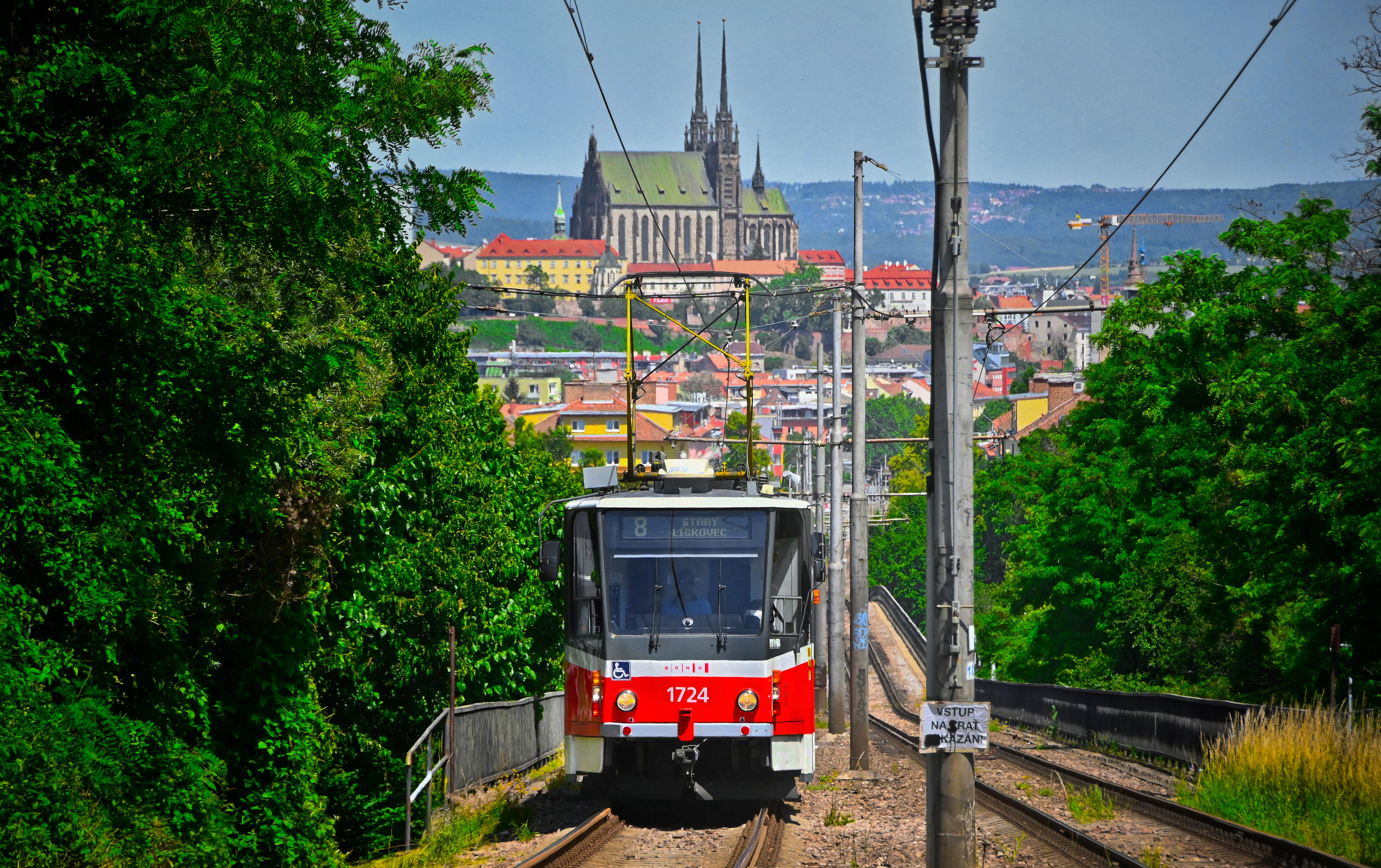
Note the different "Beak" in the former KT8D5SU in Brno

== History ==
DPMB used to own 35 KT8D5 (including the low-floor KT8D5N) in total before 2002, when they have bought a few of new Vehicles.

The first reconstructed tram arrived in Brno as a Number 1737 (formerly 519 in Košice) in Year 2002 (respectively 2003). A total of 39 Trams were modernized in Brno and Košice The low floor was inspired by KT8D5N, but it looks different.

Since 2004 Brno started modernizing KT8D5R.N2 without getting new vehicles Donated by Košice.

Most of the DPMB's KT8D5R.N2 Were reconstructed by Pragoimex, while the former Slovak KT8D5 1736 (518), 1737 (519) and 1738 (504) were reconstructed by KOS Krnov.

Since 2022 KT8D5 (including KT8D5R.N2 and KT8D5N) are being replaced by 45T, however none of the KT8D5N were replaced neither scrapped yet.

The reconstruction KT8D5R.N2 inspired Czech cities Ostrava, Prague and Plzeň in different modifications, Ostrava has reconstructed their KT8D5 to KT8D5R.N1 in a non-bidirectional version, and Prague with Plzeň have reconstured their KT8D5 to KT8D5R.N2P.

== Operations of Tatra KT8D5R.N2 ==
=== Brno ===
Operation	Article	Type	Years of Reconstructing	Total Reconstructed	Notes
Brno	Article	KT8D5R.N2	2002-2014	31	

KT8D5R.N2 in Brno are mostly used on the route 8 from Líšeň Mifkova to Bohunice (more of a Starý Lískovec) Hospital.

In late reconstructions, some KT8D5R.N2 got a new ventilation such as Janoza, most of the Vehicles have Janoza, while a few of them have Waeco. Most early repaired KT8D5R.N2 such as 1703 and 1704 also got Janoza after some years.

KT8D5R.N2 1701 and 1714 were being repaired that has changed many things, The design changes received mixed public responses, 1716 had a similar reconstruction, but looks still almost same as the Original.

In 2017 KT8D5R.N2 1704 was Representing an 150th Anniversary of Brno Public Transport, however the Vehicle has lost the ad in late 2022.

KT8D5 1736 and KT8D5SU 1724 were the last two reconstructed KT8D5 in Brno. Since 2024, total of 8 KT8D5R.N2 were scrapped. Since 2025, AŽD Praha has bought KT8D5R.N2 number 1719 due to an accident on 17 December 2024, It's planned to be a tram-train.

KT8D5R.N2 (formerly KT8D5SU) 1725 is the first "Soviet" tram to be out of order.

The First ever KT8D5R.N2 to be scrapped is 1706 in 2021 due to a bad condition.

=== Košice ===
Operation	Article	Type	Years of Reconstructing	Total Reconstructed	Notes
Košice	Article	KT8D5R.N2	2003-2009	8	

517 and 521 are the first reconstructed Vehicles in Košice, by KOS Krnov. Košice has total of 11 KT8D5 and 8 KT8D5R.N2, however they are planned to be repaired. Vehicle 537 is the first KT8D5 to undergo a new modernization, possibly KT8D5R.N2P.
