= Tatra KT8D5 =

Czech tram model

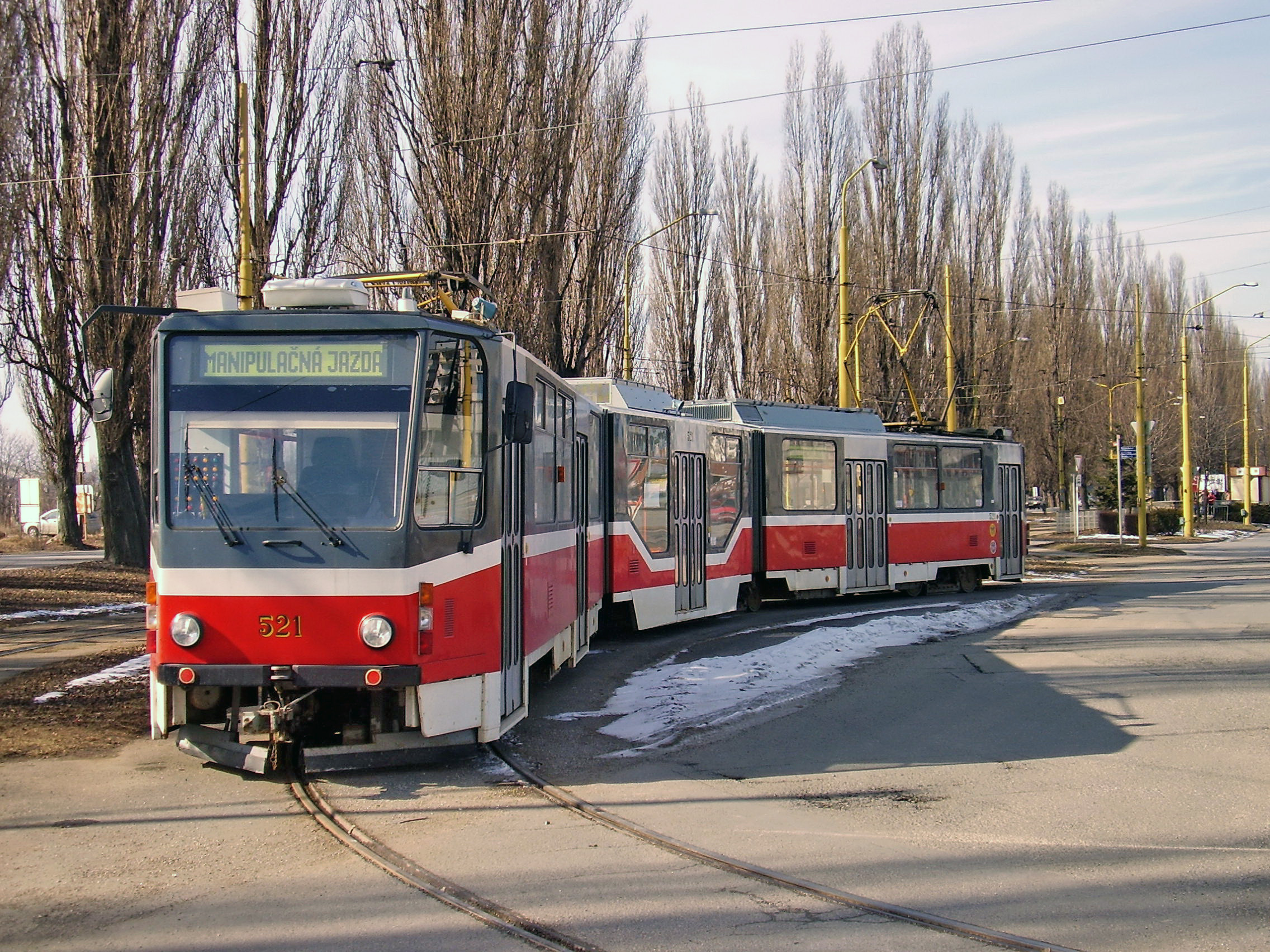
- Tatra KT8D5 tram modernized to type KT8D5R.N2 (a new low-floor section) in Košice
- In service: 1986–present
- Manufacturer: ČKD Tatra
- Constructed: 1984 (two prototypes); 1986–1991(1993 KT8D5SU)
- Entered service: 1986
- Number built: 206
- Capacity: 231 (177 standing, 54 seated)

Specifications
- Car length: 30,300 mm (99 ft 5 in) (without couplers)
- Width: 2,500 mm (8 ft 2 in)
- Height: 3,500 mm (11 ft 6 in)
- Doors: 5 per side
- Articulated sections: 2
- Wheel diameter: 700 mm (2 ft 4 in) (new)
- Wheelbase: 1,900 mm (6 ft 3 in)
- Maximum speed: 65 km/h (40 mph)
- Weight: 38 t (38,000 kg)
- Engine type: TE 023
- Traction motors: 8
- Power output: 8 x 45 kW
- Electric system(s): 600 V DC
- Current collection: Pantograph
- Wheels driven: 16
- Bogies: 4
- Track gauge: 1,435 mm (4 ft 8 1/2 in) standard gauge / 1,524 mm (5 ft)

Tatra KT8D5 is a bidirectional light rail vehicle currently (December 2025, and not expected to retire soon, except in Brno) operating in Europe and Asia. In several variations, it was designed and manufactured by Czech engineering corporation ČKD Tatra from 1984 to 1999 and a total of 206 cars were sold. The vehicle has an angular design similar to Tatra T6A5, Tatra RT8D5M, and Tatra KT4 both outside and inside. During its production period, several versions of KT8D5 were sold.

== History ==
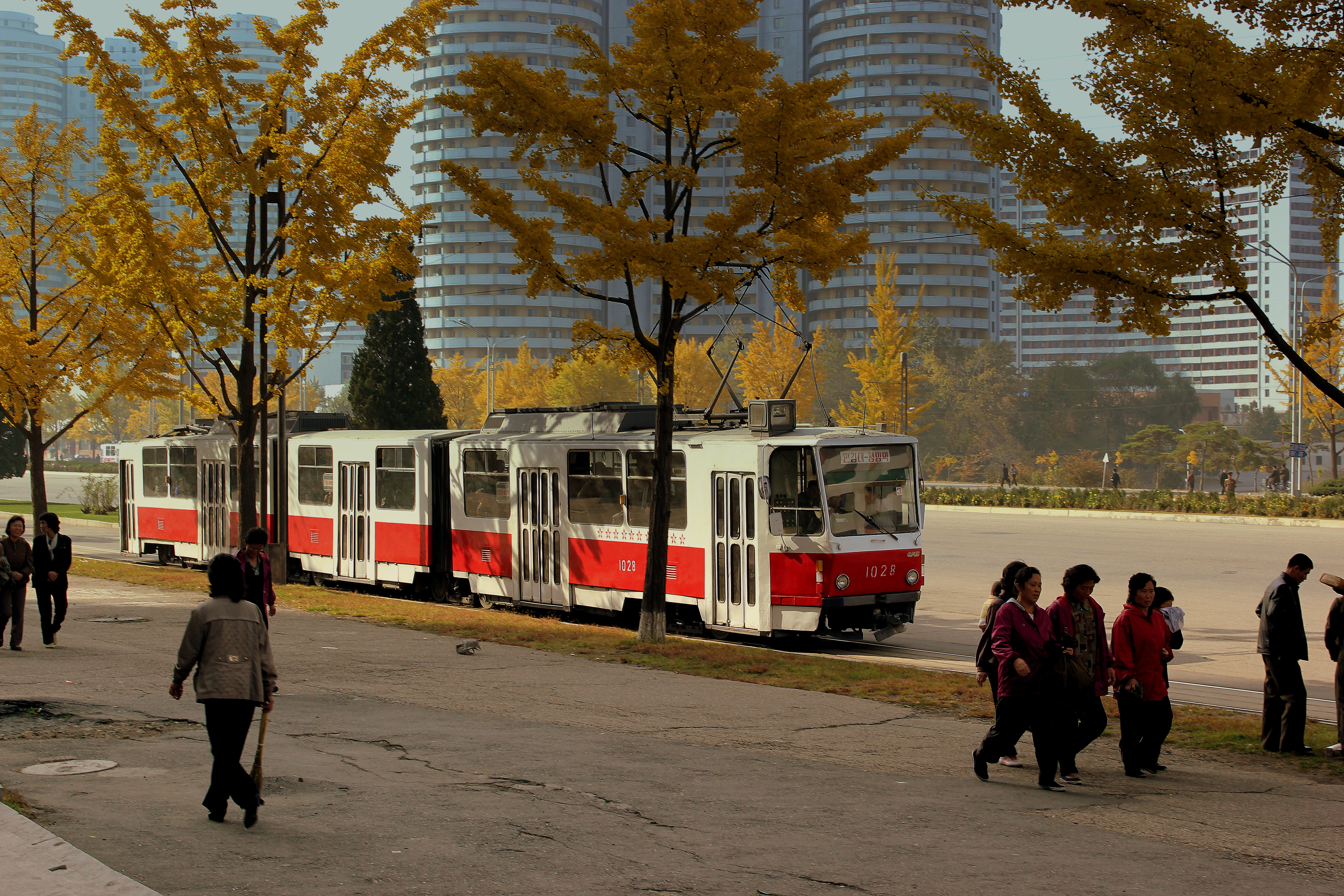
A KT8D5 tram in Pyongyang

The need for new generation vehicles for Czechoslovakia started in late 1970s. The original goal was to make a light rail vehicle with a higher capacity to meet growing demands for public transport. The project to design and build the KT8D5 was approved in 1982, and the first two prototypes were constructed in 1984. In 1989 the first prototype was sent to Moscow, from where in 1992 it was sent to Volgograd for the metrotram. The second prototype was sent to Ostrava in 1989. The first vehicles entered operation 1986 in Prague, Brno, Most and Košice.

== Design and construction ==
The Tatra KT8D5 is a large, high capacity tram constructed using three articulated body sections riding on four bogies. The middle section is located on two Jacobs bogies. The tram is bidirectional and has driving cabs at each end and doors on both sides. There are two pantographs, one located on the each end of vehicle. With a capacity of up to 231 passengers, these trams are operated on the busiest routes and during peak hours; due to their bidirectional capability they are also frequently used on routes without termini and during track maintenance for continued operation on only one track in both directions.

=== Modernization ===
A new medium low-floor cell ML8LF was installed in Tatra KT8D5 trams in the Czech Republic and Slovakia, and in one tram in Strausberg, Germany. The Thongil 181, which is based on the KT8D5, was introduced in Pyongyang, North Korea in 2018.

Tatra KT8D5R.N2 is the oldest modernization of KT8D5, that were in Brno and Košice. New major feature was the low-floor ML8LF. 1737 is the first prototype of KT8D5R.N2 in Brno that used to be in Košice with number 519. 39 of them were modernized.

From 1998 to 1999, ČKD built seven Tatra KT8D5N trams with a medium low-floor cell, IGBT transistors, and TV14 electrical equipment.

== Operations in different cities ==
=== Czechia ===
==== Prague ====
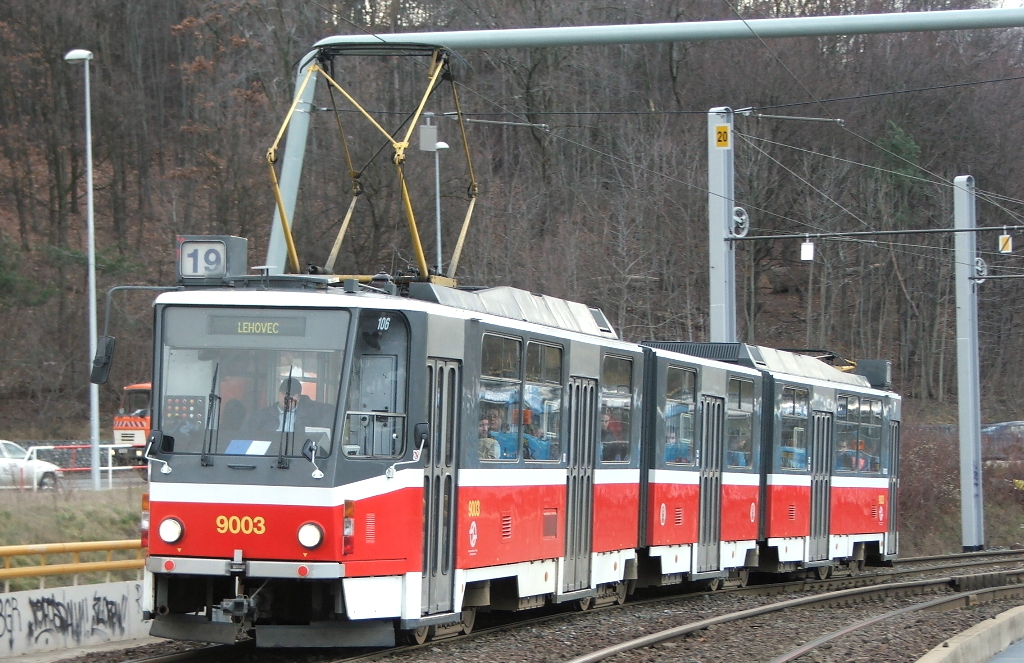
KT8D5 in Prague, produced in 1986

The first trams in Prague, numbered 9001–9004, were produced in 1986. Later, between 1989 and 1990, numbers 9005–9048 were produced. Due to a major accident in 1994, the KT8D5 tram with number 9006 was scrapped in 1995.

Most of the trams in Prague have been modernized to the KT8D5R.N2P version, except for 9006 and 9048. Trams 9048 and 9030 were the last two KT8D5 trams in service in Prague, with service ending on May 21, 2013.

Tram 9048 went to the Public Transport Museum, while 9030 was undergoing repairs.
