= Tatra T1 =

Czechoslovak tram

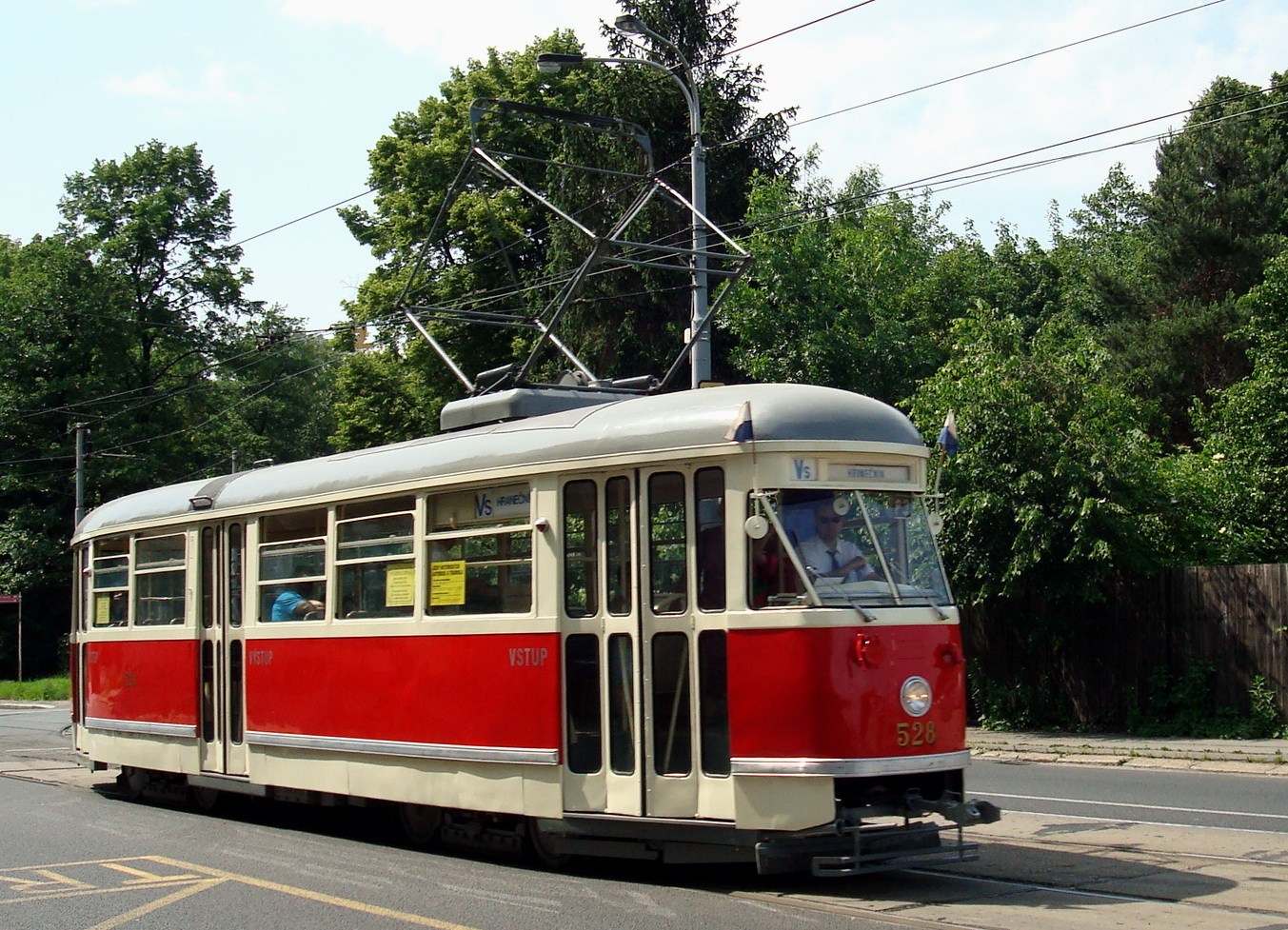
- Tram T1 in Ostrava

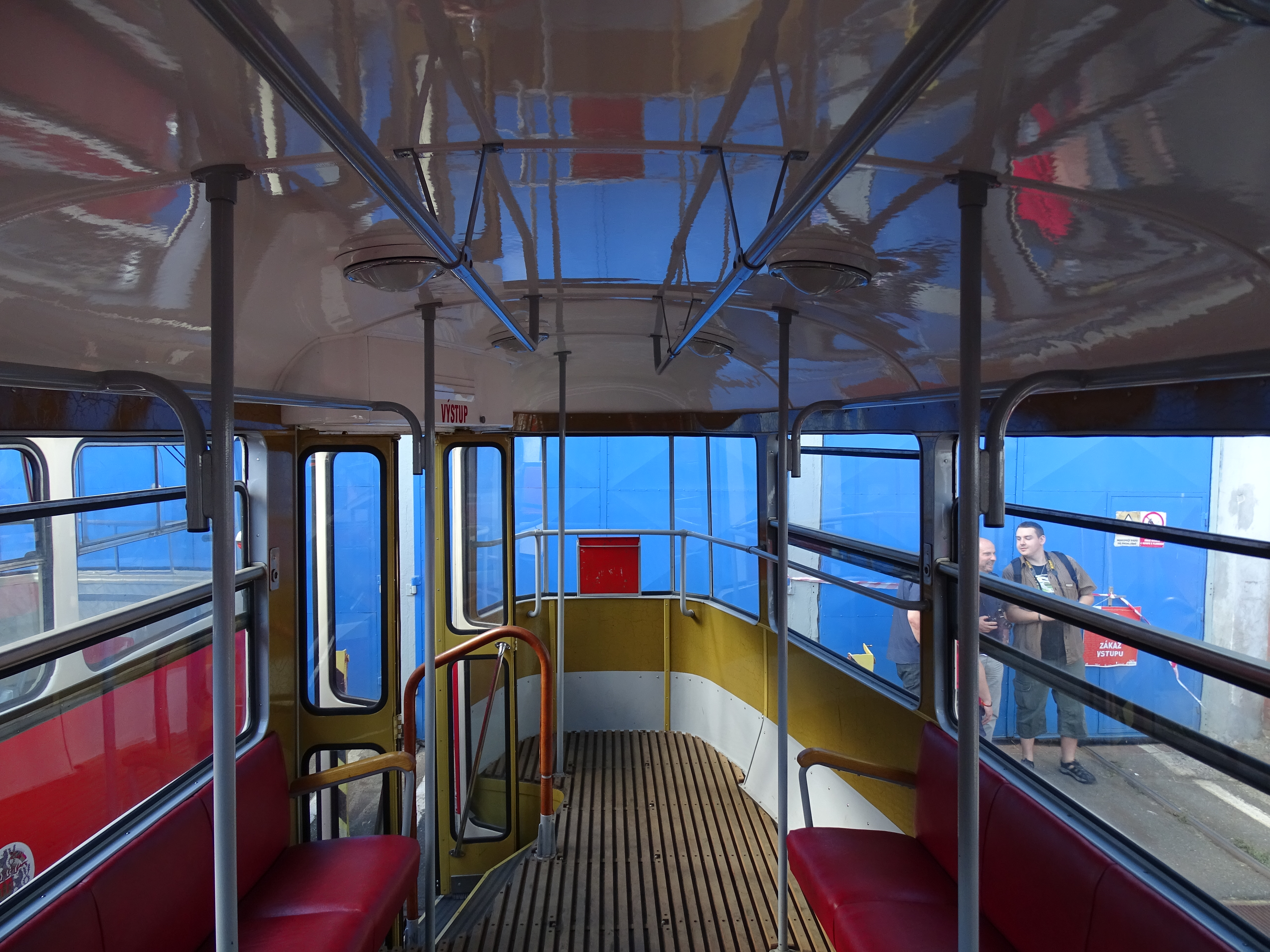
- Interior
- In service: 1952–1987
- Manufacturer: ČKD Tatra
- Assembly: Prague
- Family name: Tatra; PCC car
- Constructed: 1952–1958
- Entered service: 1952
- Number built: 287
- Number preserved: 6
- Successor: Tatra T2
- Capacity: 95

Specifications
- Car length: 14,500 mm (47 ft 7 in)
- Width: 2,400 mm (7 ft 10 in)
- Height: 3,050 mm (10 ft 0 in)
- Doors: 3
- Maximum speed: 60 km/h (37 mph)
- Weight: 16,600 kg (36,600 lb)
- Engine type: TM 22
- Traction motors: 4
- Power output: 4×40 kW
- Electric system: 600 V DC
- Current collection: pantograph
- Wheels driven: 4
- Coupling system: Albert
- Track gauge: 1,435 mm (4 ft 8 1/2 in), 1,000 mm (3 ft 3 3/8 in), 1,524 mm (5 ft)

The T1 was one of the first tramcars based on the American Presidents' Conference Committee concept, produced by Czechoslovak company ČKD Tatra. 287 multiple T1 units were built between 1952 and 1958. Most of them were used in Czechoslovakia, but 22 were shipped abroad: 2 to Warsaw and the remaining 20 to Rostov-on-Don.

The first prototype of T1, T1 TW 5001, which today is considered the forefather of all Tatra trams, premiered in the streets of Prague on 22 January 1951. It is now on exhibition in the Prague Museum Depot (Muzeum Vozovna Střešovice) in Střešovice. The cars remained in use into the 1960s, when they were converted into T3-type vehicles. The last T1 was retired on 4 April 1987, in Plzeň.

== Production ==
New Tatra T1 units were delivered to the following cities:

| Country | City | Type | Delivery years | Number | Fleet numbers |
|---|---|---|---|---|---|
| Czechoslovakia | Košice | T1 | 1956 – 1958 | 11 | 201–211 |
| Czechoslovakia | Most – Litvínov | T1 | 1957 – 1958 | 34 | 201–234 |
| Czechoslovakia | Olomouc | T1 | 1957 – 1958 | 10 | 101–110 |
| Czechoslovakia | Ostrava | T1 | 1955 – 1957 | 44 | 501–544 |
| Czechoslovakia | Plzeň | T1 | 1955 – 1957 | 33 | 101–133 |
| Czechoslovakia | Prague | T1 | 1951 – 1956 | 133 | 5001–5133 |
| Poland | Warsaw | T1 | 1955 | 2 | 501, 502 |
| Soviet Union | Rostov-on-Don | T1 | 1957 | 20 | 301–320 |
| Total: | | | | 287 | |

== Gallery ==
Tatra T1

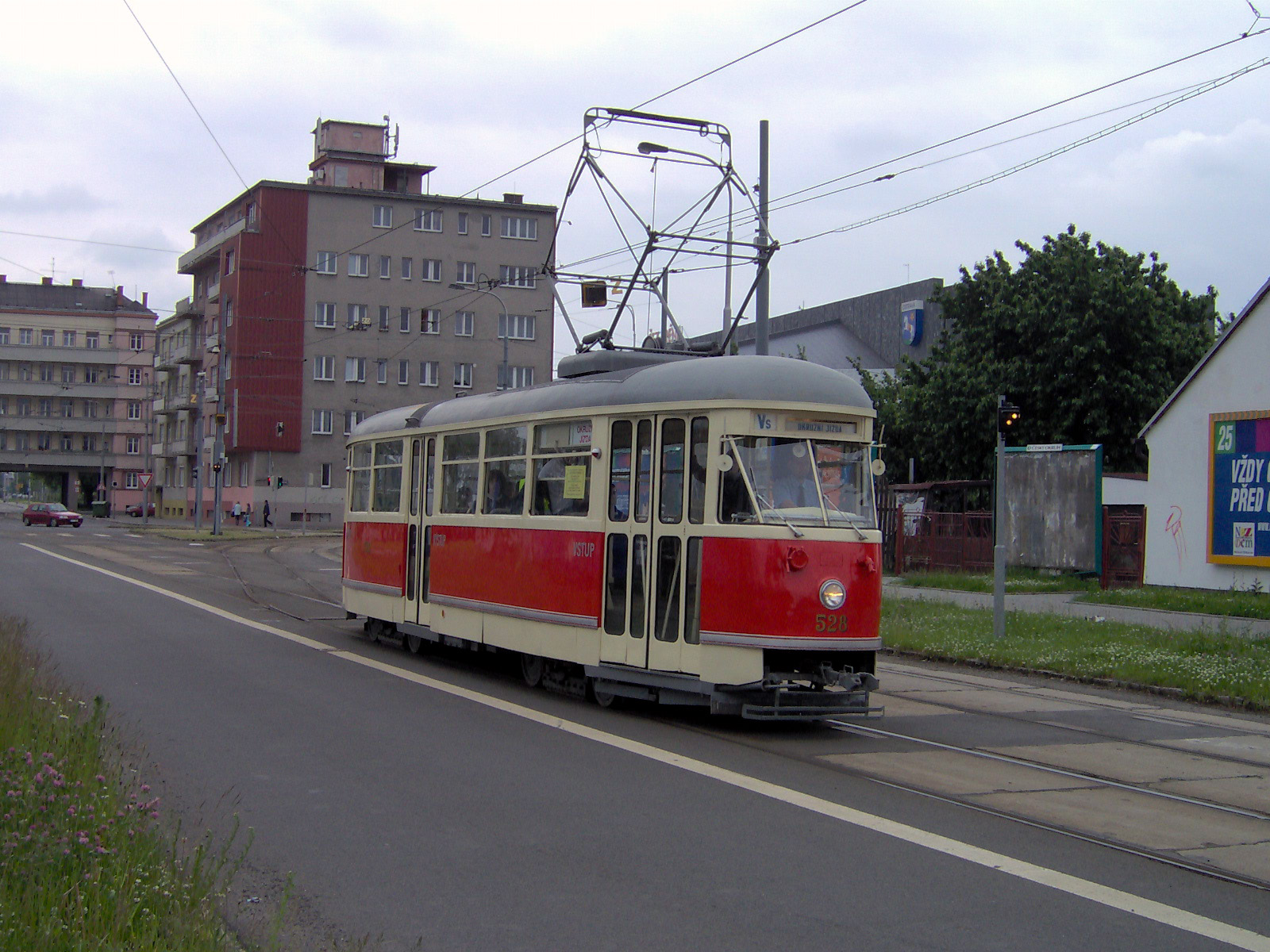
Historical T1 tram in Ostrava

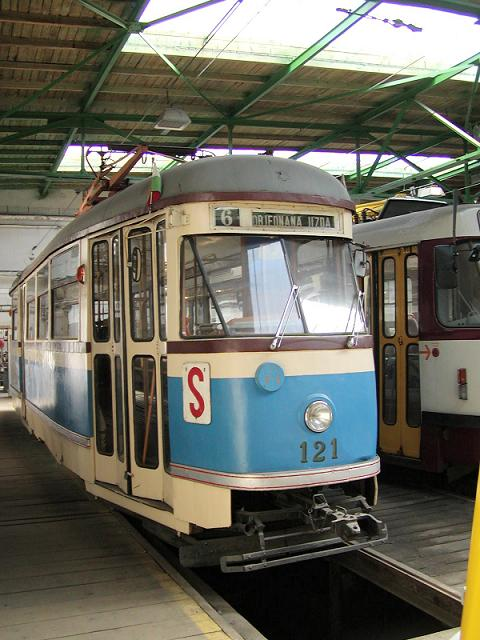
Historical T1 tram in Plzeň

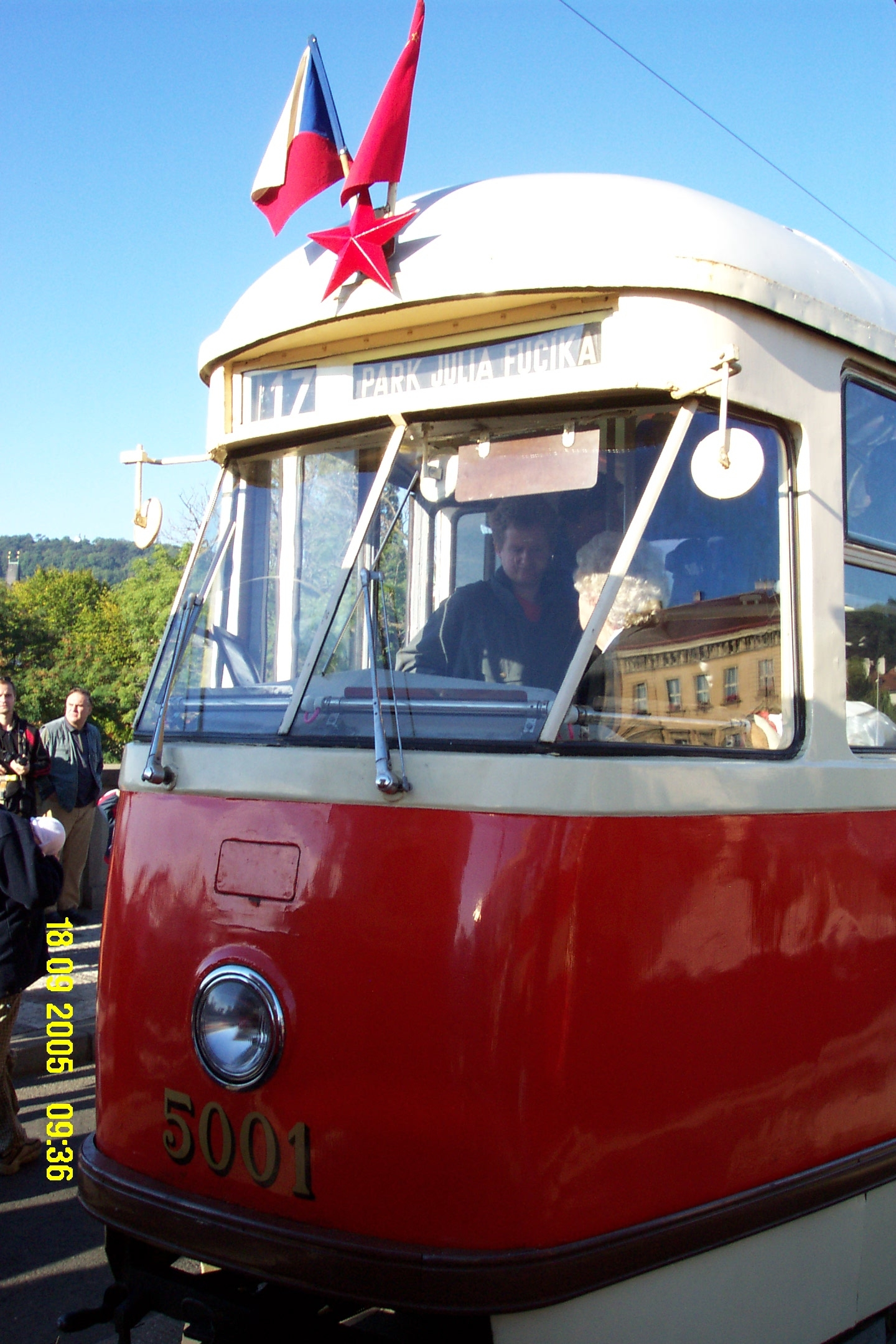
Historical T1 tram in Prague

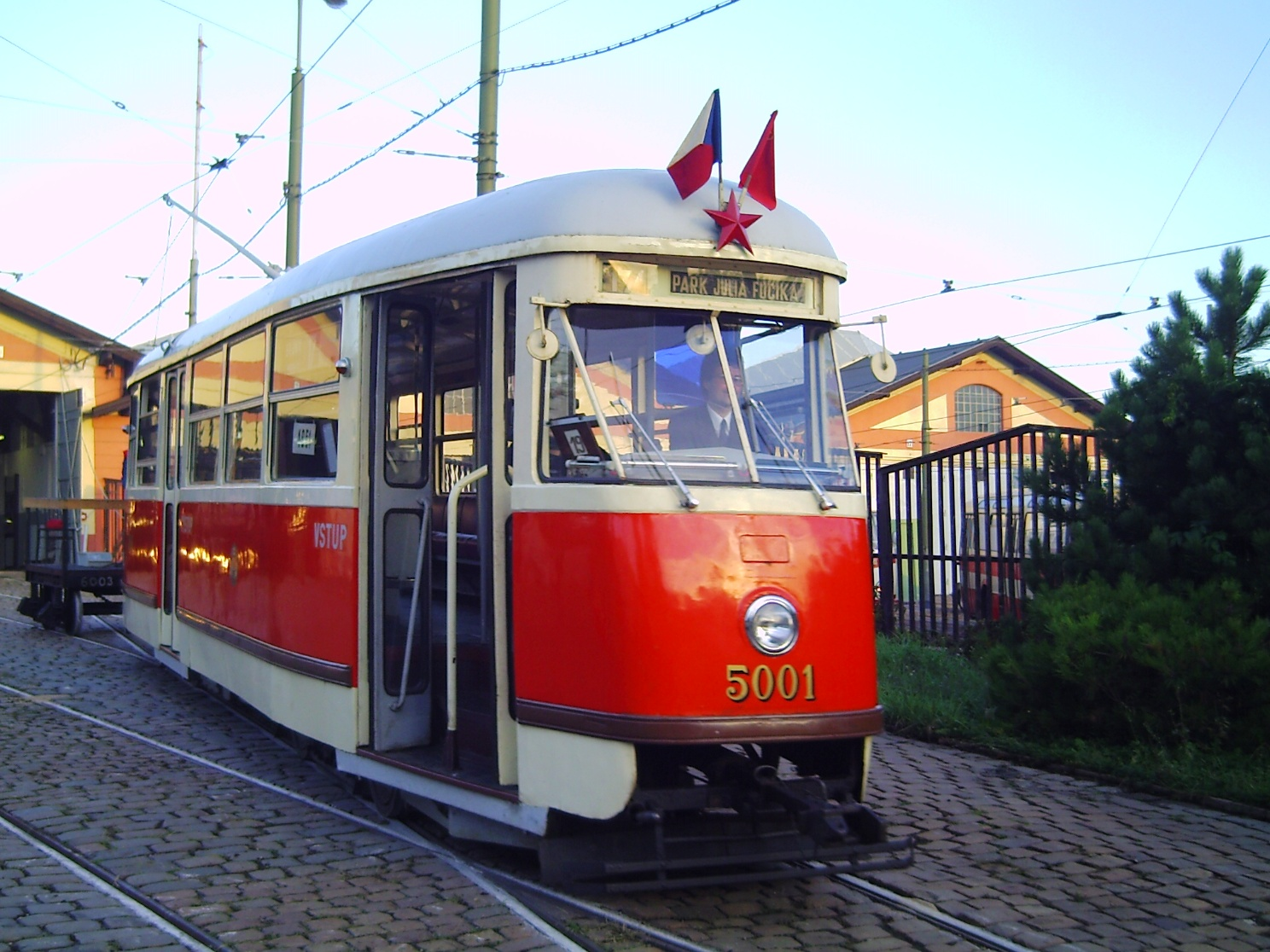
Historical T1 tram in Prague
