= Trams in Ostrava =

Tram system in Ostrava, Czech Republic

Ostrava tramway network
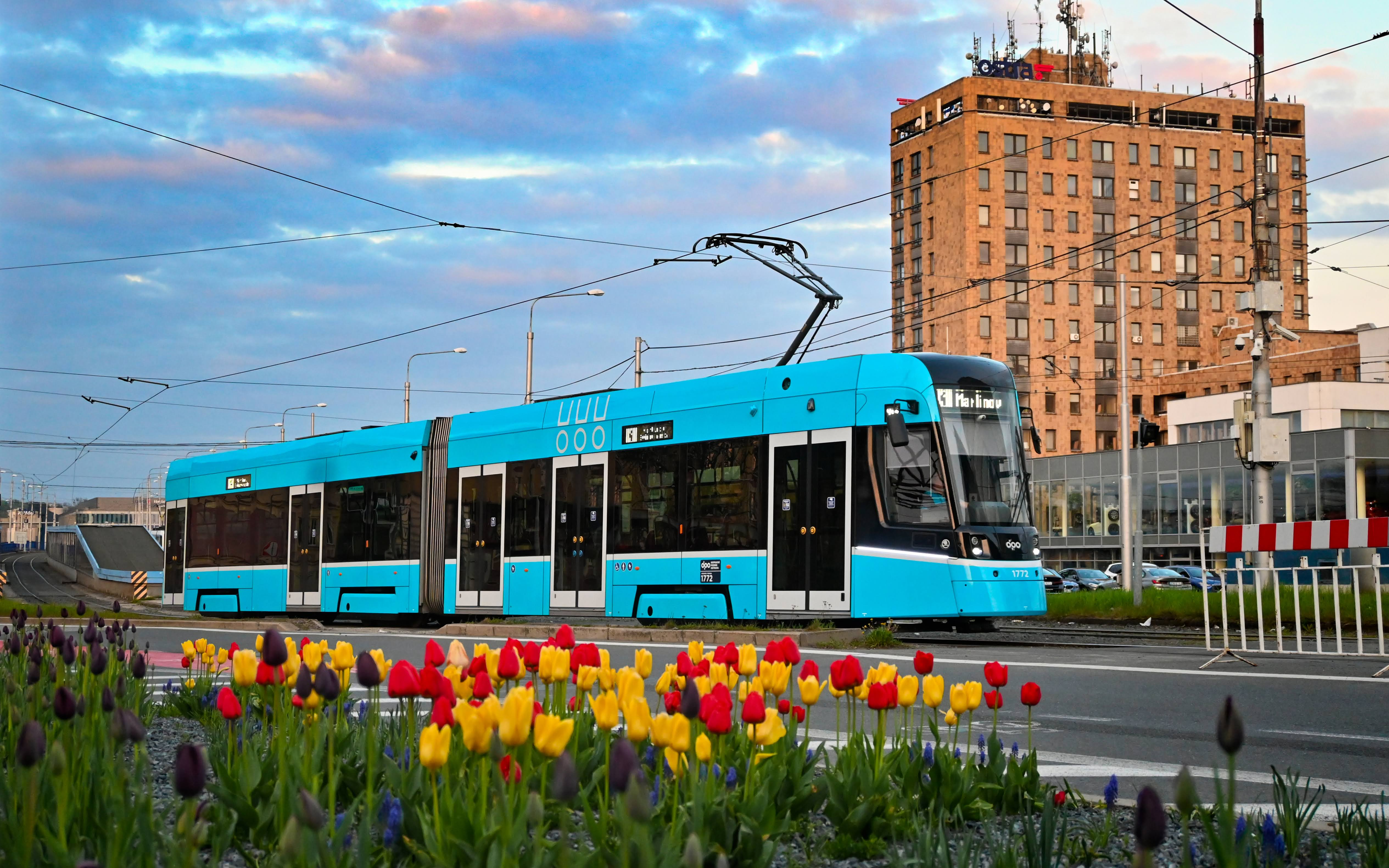
- Ostrava Škoda 39T tram near Náměstí Republiky stop

Operation
- Locale: Ostrava, Czech Republic
- Open: 1894 (steam); 1901 (electric)
- Status: Operational
- Routes: 16
- Operator: Dopravní podnik Ostrava

Infrastructure
- Track gauge: 1,435 mm (4 ft 8 1/2 in)
- Electrification: 600 V DC
- Depots: Moravská Ostrava, Poruba
- Stock: 260 tram vehicles

Statistics
- Track length (single): 62.7 km (39.0 mi)
- Route length: 230.3 km (143.1 mi)
- 2012: 46.2 million (2017)
- Website: dpo.cz

The Ostrava tramway network is the third largest tram network in the Czech Republic. The network is operated by Dopravní podnik Ostrava, a company wholly owned by the city of Ostrava that also runs the city's bus and trolleybus network. As of 2022, DPO runs 17 lines with a total route length of 231.5 kilometres (143.8 mi) on 62.7 kilometres (39.0 mi) of track. The network is a part of ODIS, the integrated public transport system of the Moravian-Silesian Region.

Most of the network is double-track and runs within the boundaries of the city. The only exception to both is Line 5 between Poruba and Budišovice, which runs on a single-track section with two sidings and is one out of two remaining single-track tram lines in the Czech Republic that is in regular operation, the other being the interurban line between Liberec and Jablonec nad Nisou.

== History ==
The first tram engine line that ran between Přívoz and Vítkovice was opened on 18 August 1894 by Brünner Local-Eisenbahn-Gesellschaft (BLEG, Czech: Brněnská společnost místních drah). The network was first extended two years later, when a branch leading to the Imperial Bridge (Czech: Řišský most, modern day Miloš Sýkora Bridge) opened. Eventually, a new line to Hulváky opened in 1899. At this point, trams were running every 20 minutes and the network was used for over a million trips. Neglected maintenance and increased operating costs of tram engines led BLEG to reduce its rolling stock from 16 to 9 engines and to adjust the interval to 30 minutes.

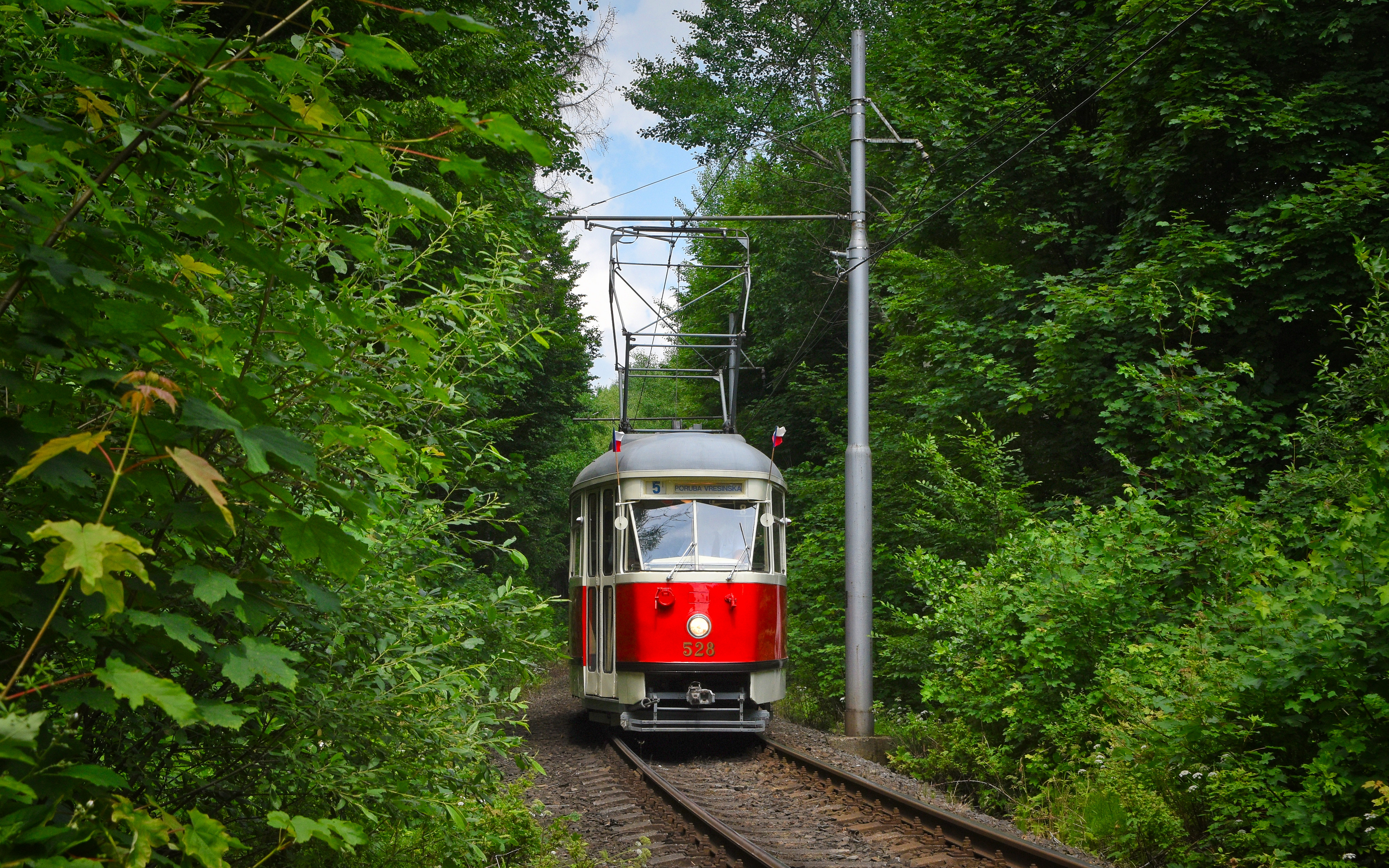
A historic T1 tram

The network was electrified at the turn of the 20th century and regular electric tram service started on 5 April 1901, although tram engines continued to be used for freight until 1922. The network further expanded in the following years, adding two new lines in 1907: Hulváky-Svinov and Mariánské Hory-Vítkovice. A second rail was also added to busier sections of existing lines. In 1920, BLEG changed name to Společnost moravských místních drah (SMMD) and moved its headquarters to Moravská Ostrava.

=== Post-World War II ===
Post-World War II, with the industry of the city growing, authorities also developed the public transportation, which included tramways. The main extensions of the system were from the city centre to industrial and residential areas in the south. In 1950s and 60s, the city started operating the larger Tatra T2 and Tatra T3 trams. Around the same time, it was decided that trams should be the main public transport in the city, as the system was open to be modernised later and could carry a lot of passengers. In the early 1960s, tramlines were added to new urban areas in the south, as they were not connected to railway. Further expansions were aimed at improving connections between new urban areas and industrial areas rather than the city centre. Trams were used to connect Poruba, which had only one route and thus was prone traffic congestion, to the rest of the city.

=== 21st century ===
The nine Inekon 01 Trio cars date from 2002 to 2004. Since 2005, low-floor new-builds of T3 trams VarioLF have also been in operation, which are being used for the renewal of the fleet. Some line sections have also been reconstructed and a new transport terminal at Hranečník was opened in August 2015.

Between 2003 and 2011, the two-way Tatra KT8D5 trams were reconstructed to the new one-way type KT8D5R.N1 with a medium low-floor section.

In May 2018, new Tango NF2 trams from the Swiss company Stadler Rail were delivered to Ostrava. These are medium-capacity cars, of which there will be 40 in total. The vehicles now have full-carriage air conditioning.

In 2018, the paintwork of public transport and service vehicles was changed. The new corporate livery is light blue to turquoise. The color is complemented by a silver stripe under the windows and black window frames. The new paint will be given to new Stadler cars and cars that will be on the grand tour.

In July and August 2020, the speed was increased to 80 km/h between the Třebovice OC and Nová Ves vodárna stops. In March 2021, there was also a speed increase between the Hranečník interchange and the Zárubek mine. In October of the same year, the speed was also increased on the line along Místecká from the Dolní Vítkovice stop to the Jeremenko Colony. In early October 2021, the first Škoda 39T car was delivered. At the end of 2022, the last Tatra T3 cars with the original resistance equipment with accelerator were taken out of service. On 29 June 2023, the last Tatra T6A5 cars were retired.

=== Future development ===
==== Poruba VIII district line ====
In 2014, the city announced a plan to build a new line, which would serve the housing estates in districts VII and VIII of Poruba. This line was already planned during the construction of Poruba in the 1960s as an integral part of its transport infrastructure. However, the plan was never carried out during socialism as the government prioritized rapidly building new apartments to solve a housing crisis, and the provisional bus service in the area was therefore kept indefinitely. The construction of the line was considered in the 2000s but was again suspended, in part due to Pustkovec rejecting the proposed route, which cuts through the district.

The plans to build the line were revived in 2014 with four proposed routes, all of which terminated at the Opavská stop near the Globus hypermarket. The route that was ultimately selected is about 3 kilometers long, connects to the existing network at VŠB-TUO stop and runs through 17. listopadu and Průběžná streets to the Opavská stop. There will be six stops on the new line, most of which correspond to existing bus stops:

- VŠB-TUO (in Opavská direction)
- Pustkovec
- Duha
- Karola Šmidkeho
- Ludvíka Podéště
- Opavská

== Routes ==
As of 2024, 16 routes are operated on Ostrava tramway's network:

- day services – in operation between 04:00 and 23:00
- day & night services – in operation continuously
- night services – in operation from 23:00 until 04:00 the following day

| Line | Route | Type | Length (km) |
|---|---|---|---|
| 1 | Hlavní nádraží – Křižíkova – Karolina – Dolní Vítkovice – Dřevoprodej – Dubina | Day | 11.4 |
| 2 | Hlavní nádraží – Křižíkova – Karolina – Dolní Vítkovice – Karpatská – Výškovice | Day & night | 12.2 |
| 3 | Poruba, vozovna – Svinov, mosty – Hulváky – Vagonka – Palkovského – ÚMOB Jih - Dubina | Day | 14.7 |
| 4 | Martinov – Svinov, mosty – Hulváky – Karolina – Hranečník – Nová huť již. brána | Day & night | 17.2 |
| 5 | Budišovice, Zátiší – Dolní Lhota – Krásné Pole – Vřesina – Poruba, Vřesinská | Day | 8.8 |
| 6 | Mor. Ostrava, Plynárny – Karolina – Dolní Vítkovice – Kpt. Vajdy – Výškovice | Day | 11.4 |
| 7 | Poruba, Vřesinská – Svinov, mosty – Palkovského – SPORT ARÉNA – Karpatská – Výškovice | Day & night | 13.8 |
| 8 | Poruba, Vřesinská – Svinov, mosty – Hulváky – Karolina – Hlavní nádraží | Day & night | 13.6 |
| 8 | Poruba, Vřesinská – Svinov, mosty – Hulváky – Karolina – Přívoz, Hlučínská | Day & night | 14.5 |
| 10 | Hranečník – Výstaviště – Karolina – Dolní Vítkovice – Dřevoprodej – Dubina | Day | 11.2 |
| 11 | Poruba, vozovna - Svinov mosty - Hulvácká – SPORT ARÉNA – Kpt. Vajdy – Zábřeh | Day | 12.2 |
| 12 | Hranečník – Výstaviště – Karolina – Vagonka – SPORT ARÉNA – Provaznická – Dubina | Day | 13.6 |
| 14 | Přívoz, Hlučínská – Křižíkova – Výstaviště – Hranečník – Nová huť již.brána | Day | 10.5 |
| 15 | Dubina – ÚMOb Jih – Kpt. Vajdy – Výškovice | Day | 6.9 |
| 17 | Poruba, Vřesinská – Svinov, mosty – Hulvácká – ÚMOb Jih – Dubina | Day | 13.3 |
| 18 | Hlavní nádraží – Křižíkova – Karolina – Hulváky – Hulvácká – ÚMOb Jih – Dubina | Night | 13.3 |
| 19 | Martinov – Svinov, mosty – Hulváky – SPORT ARÉNA – Provaznická – Dubina | Night | 16.9 |

== Rolling stock ==
In December 2017, 260 trams intended for passenger transport were in operation in Ostrava:

| Image | Type | Subtypes | Delivered | In service (as of 2023-12-31) |
|---|---|---|---|---|
| Tatra T3 | Tatra T3 | Tatra T3R.P | 1983–1987 | 20 |
| Tatra KT8D5R.N1 | Tatra KT8D5 | Tatra KT8D5R.N1 | 1989–1990 | 16 |
| Škoda 03T | Škoda 03T | Škoda 03T Astra | 1998–2001 | 14 |
| Inekon 01 Trio | Inekon 01 Trio | Inekon 01 Trio | 2002–2004 | 9 |
| VarioLFR.E | VarioLF | VarioLFR.E | 2004–2012 | 47 |
| VarioLFR.E | VarioLF | VarioLFR.S | 2013–2014 | 16 |
| VarioLF2 | VarioLF2 | VarioLF2 | 2007 | 1 |
| VarioLF2 | VarioLF2 | VarioLF2R.S | 2013 | 2 |
| VarioLF3 | VarioLF3 | VarioLF3 | 2006–2007 | 2 |
| VarioLF3/2 | VarioLF3/2 | VarioLF3/2 | 2008–2011 | 3 |
| VarioLF2 plus | VarioLF2 plus | VarioLF2 plus | 2009 | 1 |
| Stadler Tango NF2 | Stadler Tango | Stadler Tango NF2 (nOVA) | 2018–2019 | 39 |
| Škoda 39T | Škoda 39T | ForCity Smart Ostrava | 2021–2023 | 35 |

== See also ==
- History of Ostrava
- List of tram and light rail transit systems
- List of town tramway systems in the Czech Republic
