= List of town tramway systems in the Czech Republic =

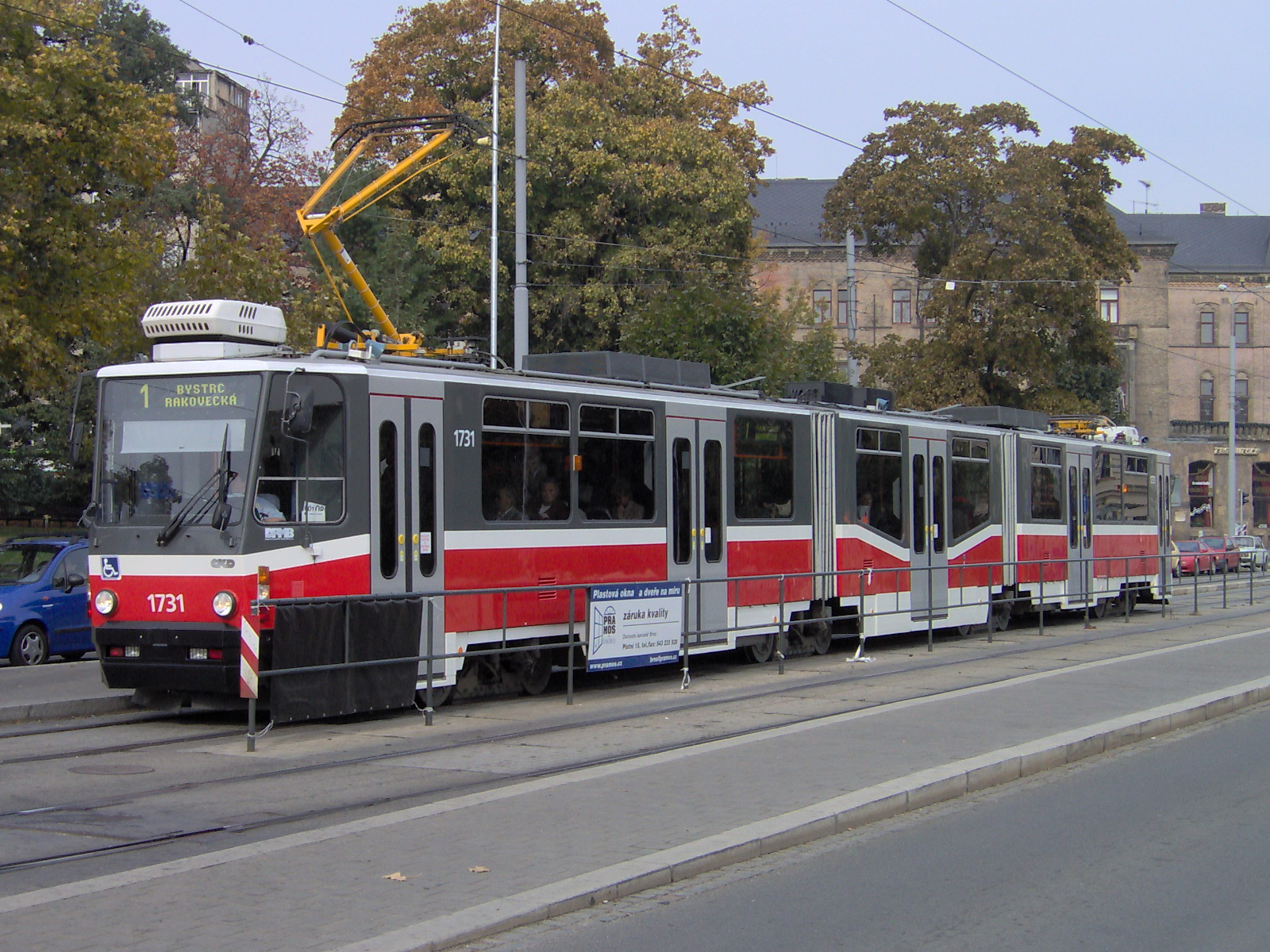
Tatra KT8D5 in Brno

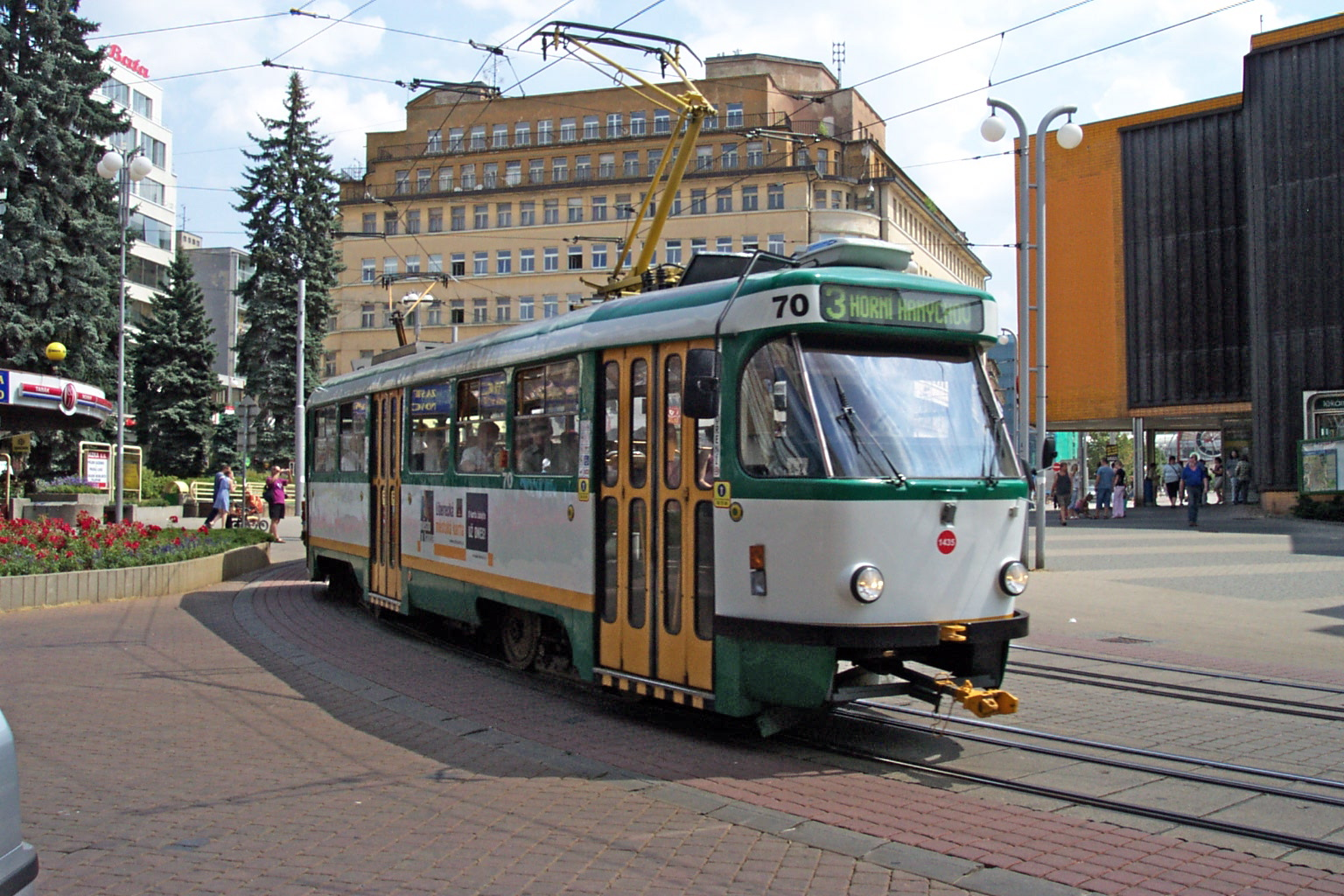
Tatra T3 in Liberec

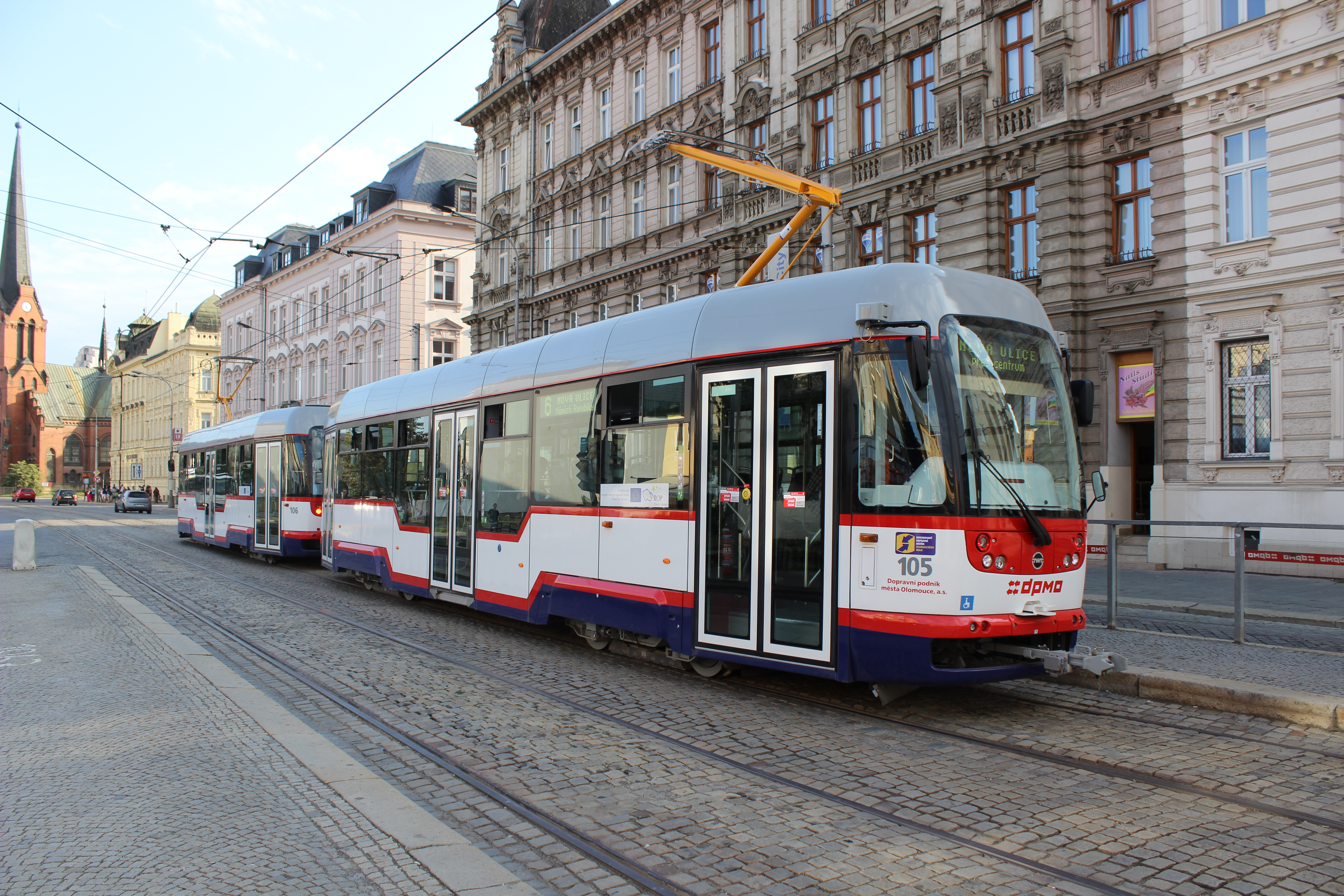
VarioLF in Olomouc

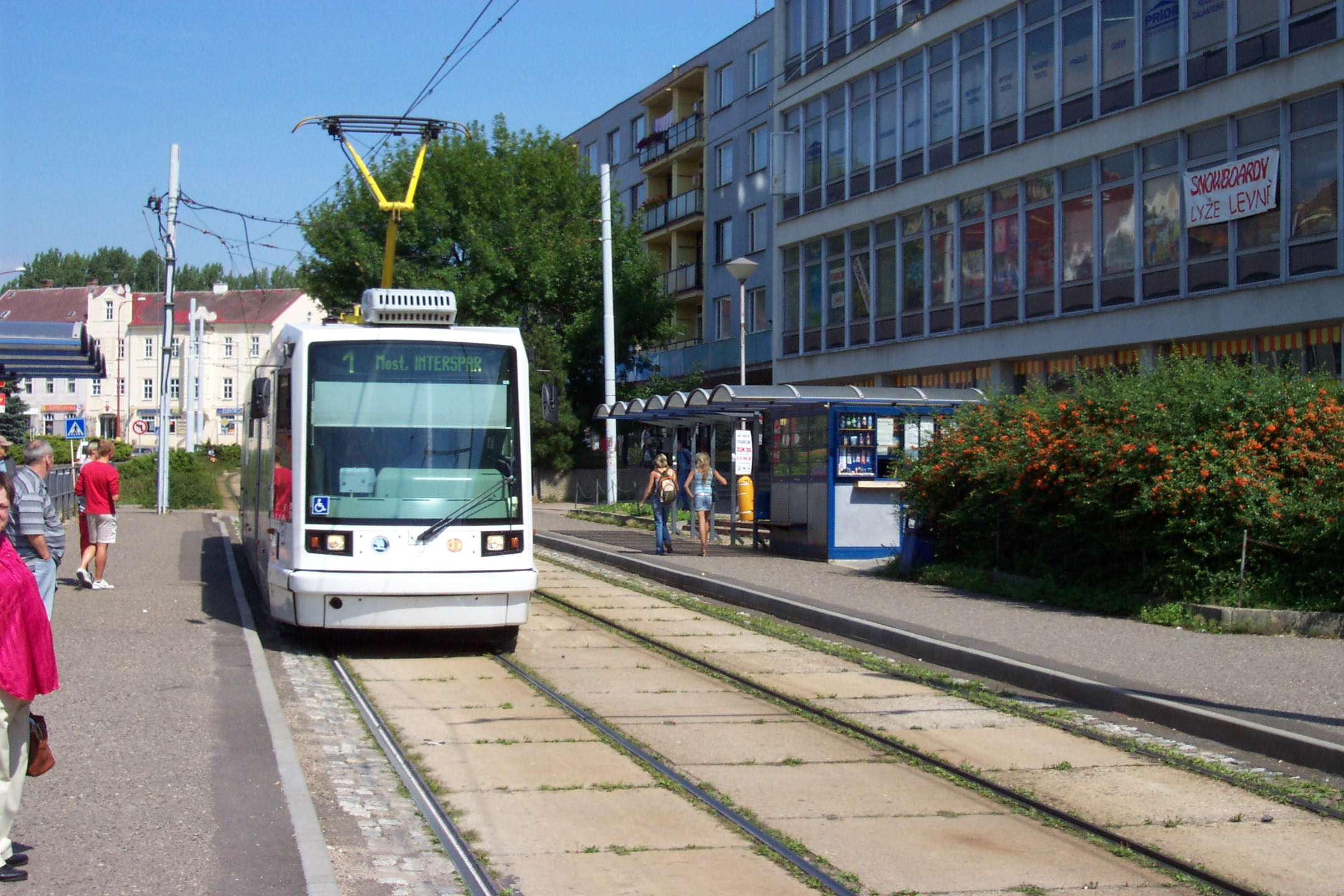
Škoda 03 T in Litvínov

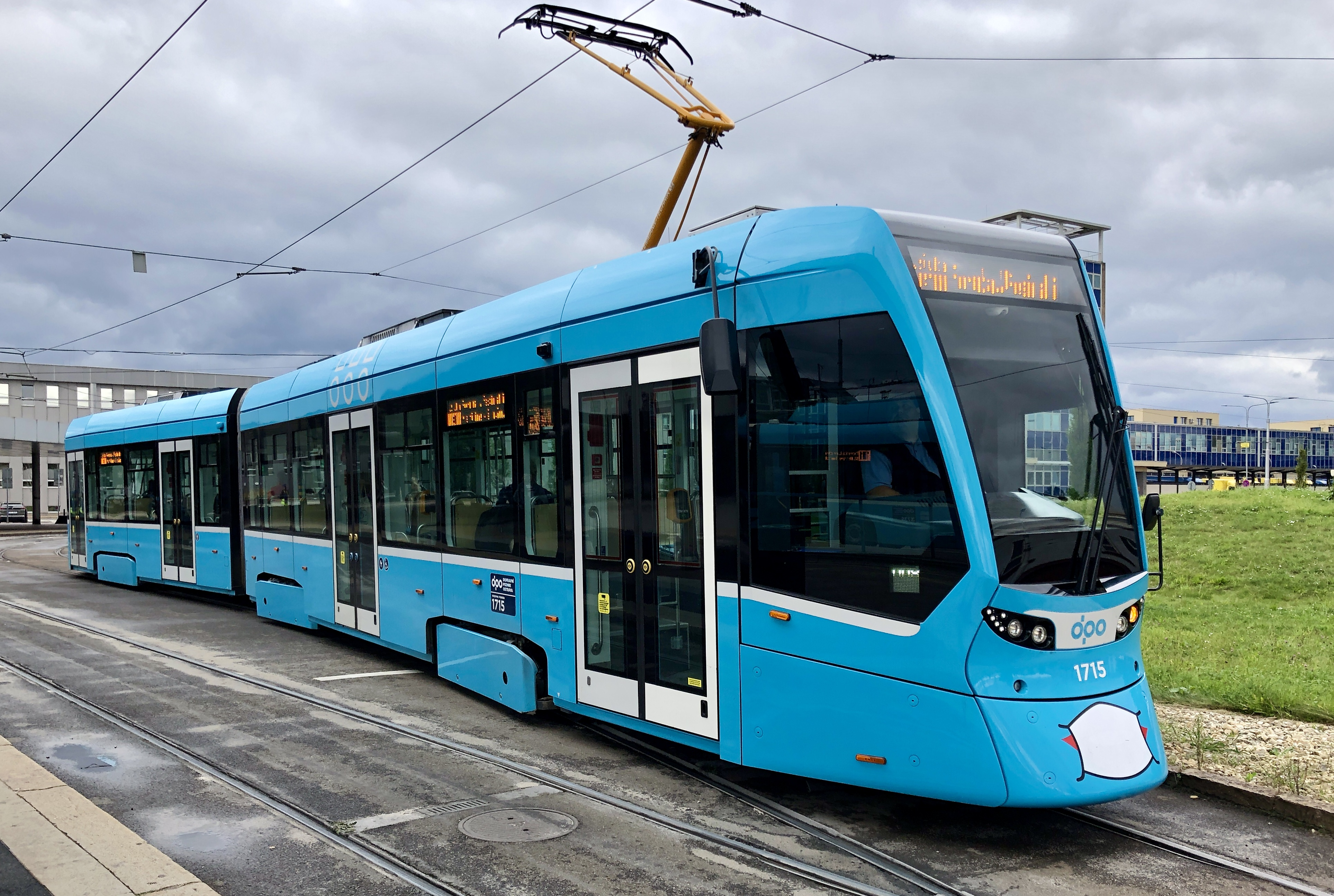
Stadler Tango in Ostrava

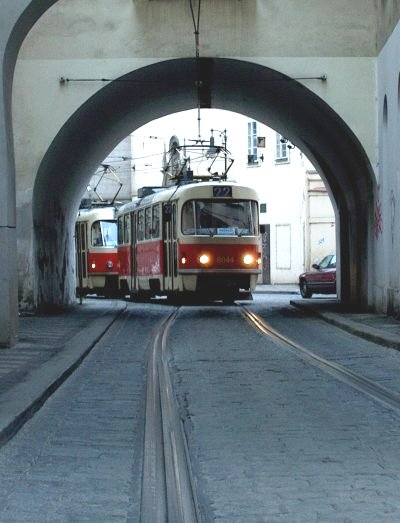
Tatra T3, still most used tram in Prague Tram System

This is a list of town tramway systems in the Czech Republic. It includes all tram systems, past and present; cities with currently operating systems, and those systems themselves, are indicated in bold and blue background colored rows. The use of the diamond (♦) symbol indicates where there were (or are) two or more independent tram systems operating concurrently within a single metropolitan area. Those tram systems that operated on other than standard gauge track (where known) are indicated in the 'Notes' column.

Name of system	Location	Traction type	Date (from)	Date (to)	Notes
	Bohumín	Horse	22 Dec 1902	13 Oct 1903	Gauge: 760 mm (2 ft 5 15/16 in)
	Bohumín	Steam	13 Oct 1903 2 Jan 1918	23 Sep 1916 23 Jul 1918	Gauge: 760 mm (2 ft 5 15/16 in)
	Bohumín	Electric	23 Sep 1916 23 Jul 1918	2 Jan 1918 1 Aug 1973	Gauge: 760 mm (2 ft 5 15/16 in)
**Trams in Brno**	**Brno**	Horse	17 Aug 1869 4 Jun 1876	1874 3 Oct 1880	
**Trams in Brno**	**Brno**	Steam	31 May 1884	21 Jun 1900	
**Trams in Brno**	**Brno**	Electric	21 Jun 1900	-	Inverse polarity: Brno's tram system has − (minus) electric pole in the overhead wires and + (plus) electric pole in the tracks. Other Czech tram systems have standard polarity (+ in overhead lines, − in tracks; +600 V DC), Brno is unique with its −600 V DC.
	České Budějovice	Electric	15 Jun 1909	2 Mar 1950	Gauge: 1,000 mm (3 ft 3 3/8 in)
Trams in Teschen	Český Těšín/Cieszyn	Electric	12 Feb 1911	2 Apr 1921	Gauge: 1,000 mm (3 ft 3 3/8 in); After city was divided in 1920, line became international with Border controls, which led to its closure.
**Trams in Liberec and Jablonec**	**Liberec – Jablonec**	Electric	16 Nov 1897	-	Gauge: 1,435 mm (4 ft 8 1/2 in); Liberec's tram network has sections all with 1,435 mm gauge, and a section between Liberec and Jablonec used to operate on 1,000 mm gauge. Liberec - Jablonec nad Nisou interurban line opened 16 Nov 1953, completed 1955. Partial closures for reconstruction during 1972–1975, and 2021-2023 for conversion from 1,000 mm (3 ft 3 3/8 in) gauge to 1,435 mm (4 ft 8 1/2 in) gauge.
	Jihlava	Electric	26 Aug 1909	4 Dec 1948	Gauge: 1,000 mm (3 ft 3 3/8 in)
	Mariánské Lázně	Electric	12 May 1902	26 Apr 1952	Gauge: 1,000 mm (3 ft 3 3/8 in)
**Trams in Most and Litvínov**	**Most–Litvínov**	Electric	7 Aug 1901	-	New alignment opened 30 Dec 1957, original alignment closed 24 Mar 1961.
**Trams in Olomouc**	**Olomouc**	Electric	1 Apr 1899	-	
	Opava	Electric	4 Dec 1905	23 Apr 1956	Gauge: 1,000 mm (3 ft 3 3/8 in)
**Trams in Ostrava**	**Ostrava**	Steam	18 Aug 1894	1 May 1901	
**Trams in Ostrava**	**Ostrava**	Electric	1 May 1901	-	
**Trams in Plzeň**	**Plzeň**	Electric	29 Jun 1899	-	
**Trams in Prague**	**Prague**	Horse	23 Sep 1875	12 May 1905	
**Trams in Prague**	**Prague**	Electric	18 Jul 1891	-	
	Teplice	Electric	26 Jul 1895	31 Jan 1959	Gauge: 1,000 mm (3 ft 3 3/8 in)
	Ústí nad Labem	Electric	1 Jul 1899	1 Jun 1970	Gauge: 1,000 mm (3 ft 3 3/8 in)
	Vítkovice	Steam	3 Jul 1913	29 Mar 1934	
	Vítkovice	Electric	29 Mar 1934		Vítkovice, now part of Ostrava and served by the Ostrava town tramway system, had a separate tramway to 1953

== See also ==
- List of town tramway systems in Europe
- List of tram and light rail transit systems
