= Tatra T2 =

1955 Czechoslovak tramcar

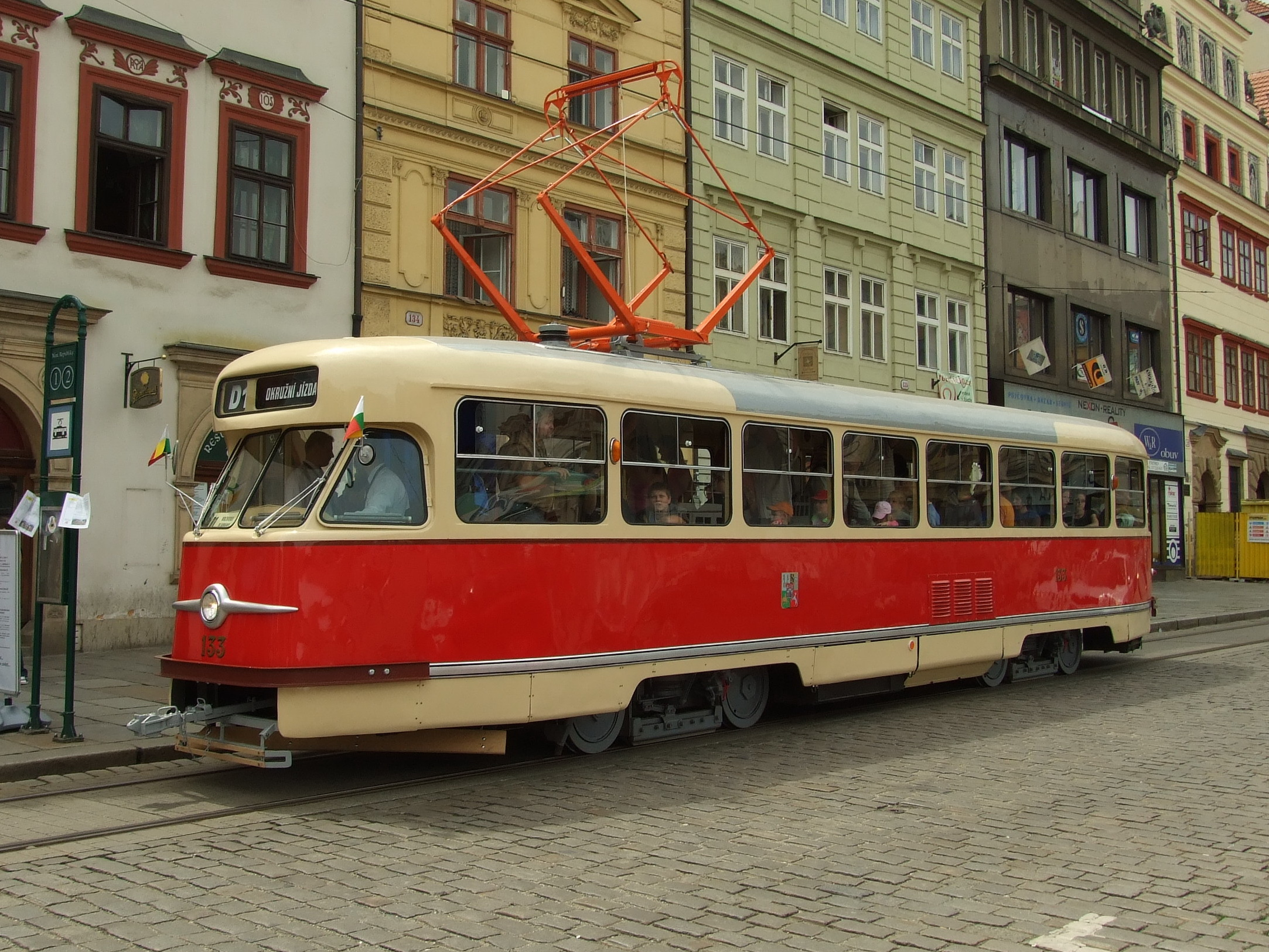
- Tatra T2 in Plzeň
- In service: 1955–2018 (2020–present)
- Manufacturer: ČKD Tatra
- Assembly: Czechoslovakia Prague
- Family name: Tatra
- Constructed: 1957–1962
- Entered service: 1955
- Number built: 771
- Number preserved: 10
- Predecessor: Tatra T1
- Successor: Tatra T3
- Capacity: 100 / 94 (T2SU)

Specifications
- Car length: 14,000 mm (45 ft 11 in)
- Width: 2,500 mm (8 ft 2 in)
- Height: 3,050 mm (10 ft 0 in)
- Doors: 3 / 2 (T2SU)
- Maximum speed: 65 km/h (40 mph)
- Weight: 17,318 kg (38,180 lb)
- Engine type: TM 22
- Traction motors: 4
- Power output: 4×40 kW
- Electric system(s): 600 V DC
- Current collection: pantograph
- Wheels driven: 4
- Coupling system: Albert
- Track gauge: 1,435 mm (4 ft 8 1/2 in), 1,000 mm (3 ft 3 3/8 in), 1,524 mm (5 ft)

T2 is the name of a tramcar, produced by Tatra. The tramcar was produced between 1955 and 1962, and a total of 771 cars were produced.

The very first T2 prototypes were tested as number 6001 and 6002 in Prague in 1955. In 1958, the first series of produced cars were delivered to almost all Czechoslovak networks. They were not put into service in Jablonec, because of an ongoing discussion on whether to keep or not to keep the track width of 1,000 mm (3 ft 3 3/8 in), nor in Prague, where the cars were considered too wide.

The T2s were more durable than their predecessor, the T1, and so also more long-lived. The last T2s were superseded in the 1980s, although some vehicles remain in museums. Some T1 vehicles were converted into T3 during the 1960s.

== T2SU ==
The T2SUs were T2 cars that were delivered to the Soviet Union, hence the suffix -SU. The cars differed from the Czechoslovak version, particularly by the removal of the middle door, making room for more seats. The fare-collection system in most of the Soviet Union maintained that all people pay for their ride, thus the requirement for passengers to board from the rear door and depart from the front door. Removal of the middle door was hence required by contractors to avoid free-riders.

The last T2SUs were withdrawn from service in the 1980s. In total, 380 T2SU cars were delivered to the Soviet Union.

== T2R ==
In the 1970s and 1980s, 112 T2 trams were modernized into T2R. Modernization included overhauling of electrical equipment (similar to Tatra T3) and some changes in the car body. That modernization helped the trams to survive into the 1990s. Two T2Rs were modernized in the early 2000s in Liberec and these two remained in everyday use till 2018. These trams have been bought by Prague and after reconstruction are in daily use on the retro line 23. In Brno, Liberec and Ostrava four other T2Rs are used as service trams.

== Production ==
771 trams were produced from 1955 to 1962 and delivered to:

Country	City	Type	Delivery years	Number	Fleet numbers
Czechoslovakia	Bratislava	Т2	1959–1962	66	201–266
Czechoslovakia	Brno	Т2	1958–1962	94	401–494
Czechoslovakia	Košice	T2	1958–1962	31	211–242
Czechoslovakia	Liberec	T2	1959–1961	14	10–23
Czechoslovakia	Most and Litvínov	T2	1961–1962	36	235–270
Czechoslovakia	Olomouc	T2	1960–1961	4	111–114
Czechoslovakia	Ostrava	T2	1958–1962	100	600–699
Czechoslovakia	Plzeň	T2	1960–1962	26	134–159
Czechoslovakia	Prague	T2	1955	2	1001–1002
Czechoslovakia	Ústí nad Labem	T2	1960–1962	18	151–168
Soviet Union	Kyiv	Т2SU	1960–1962	50	5002–5051
Soviet Union	Kuybyshev	Т2SU	1958–1962	43	
Soviet Union	Leningrad	Т2SU	1959	2	1001, 1003
Soviet Union	Moscow	Т2SU	1959–1962	180	301–480
Soviet Union	Rostov-on-Don	Т2SU	1958–1959	40	321–360
Soviet Union	Sverdlovsk	Т2SU	1958–1962	65	
Total:				771	

Note: This is a production list. Public transport companies may sell used trams to other companies, thus the number of cities with a history of these trams may be higher.

== Photo gallery ==
Tatra T2

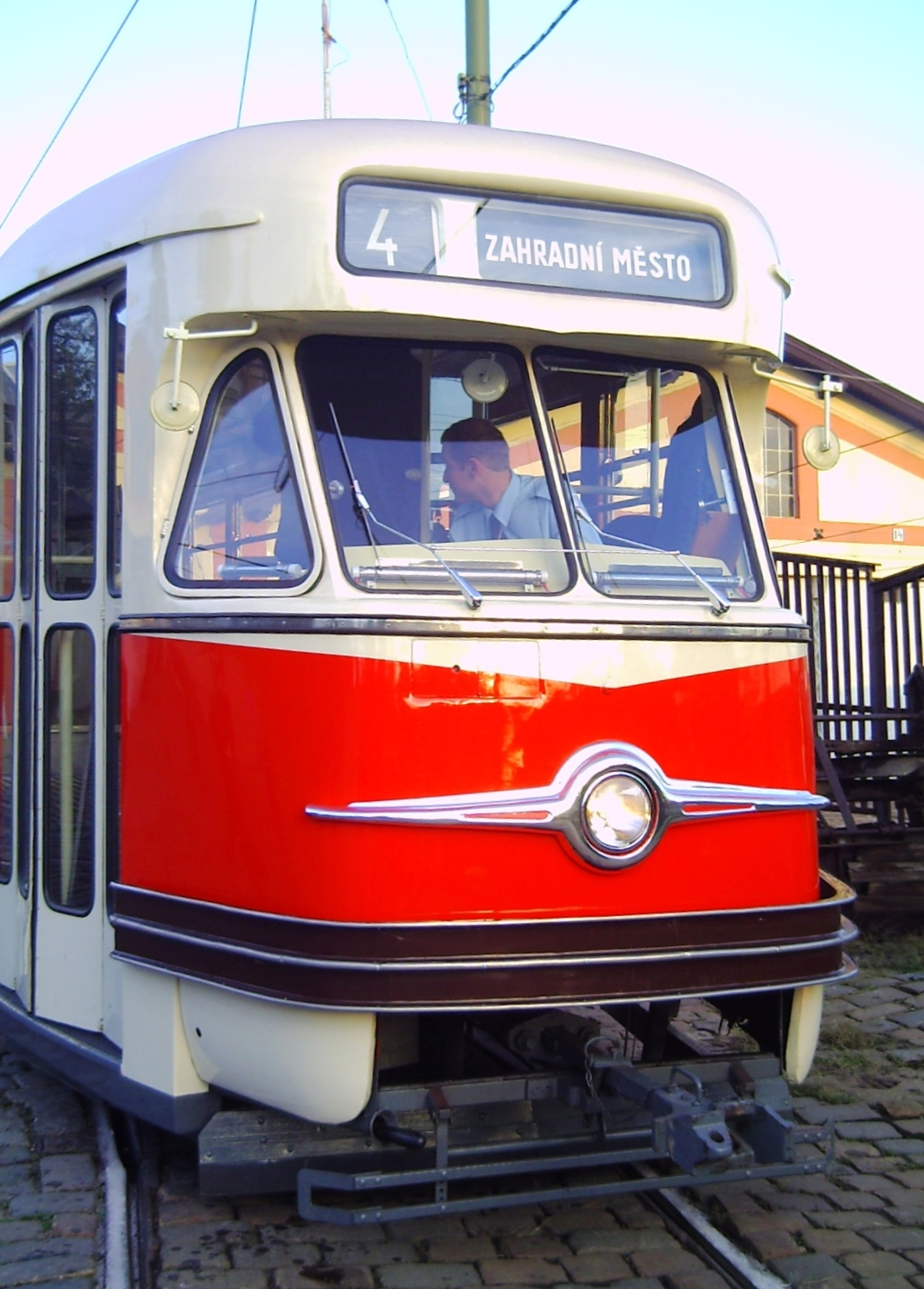
Historical T2 tram in Prague

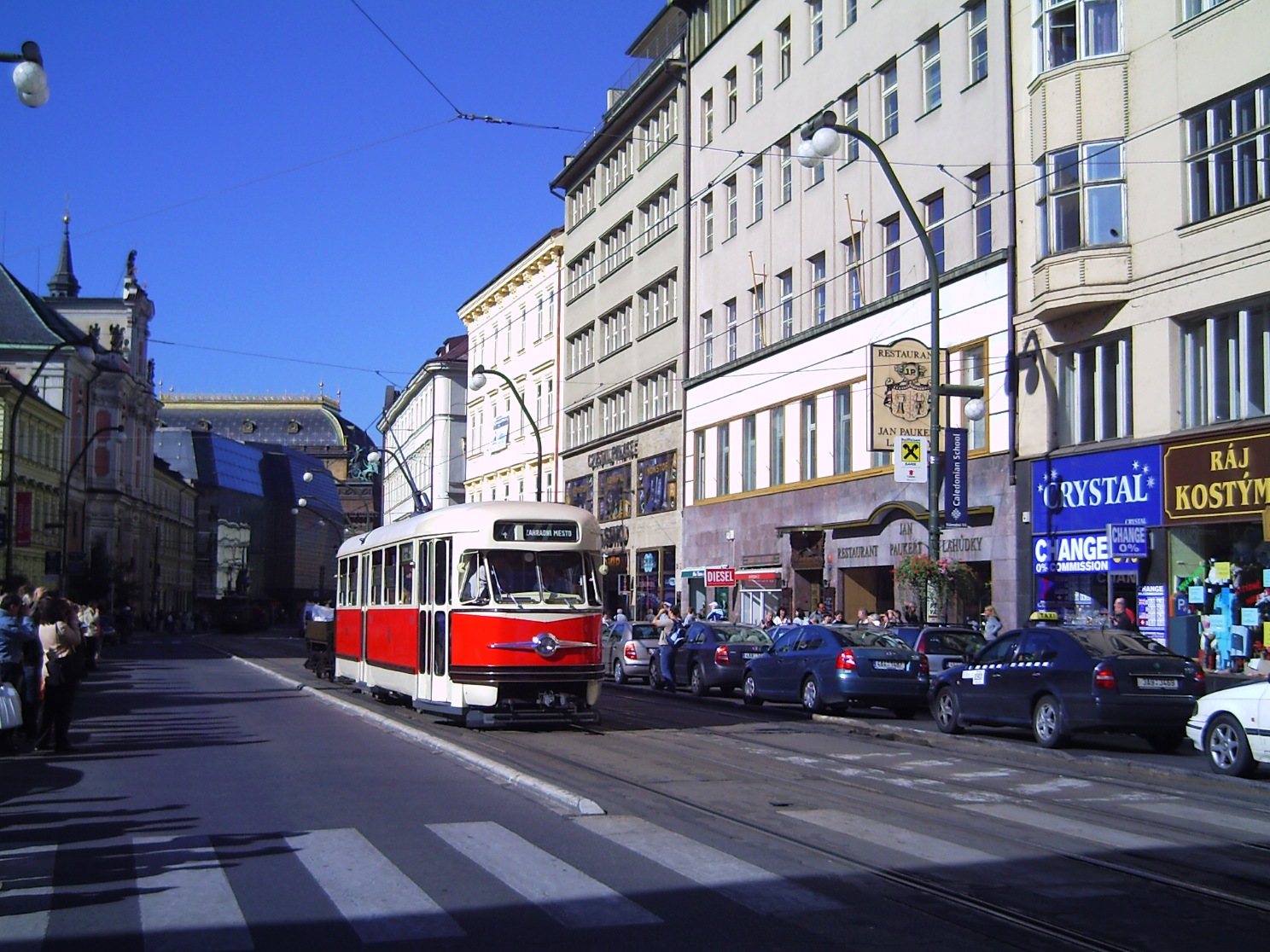
Historical T2 tram in Prague

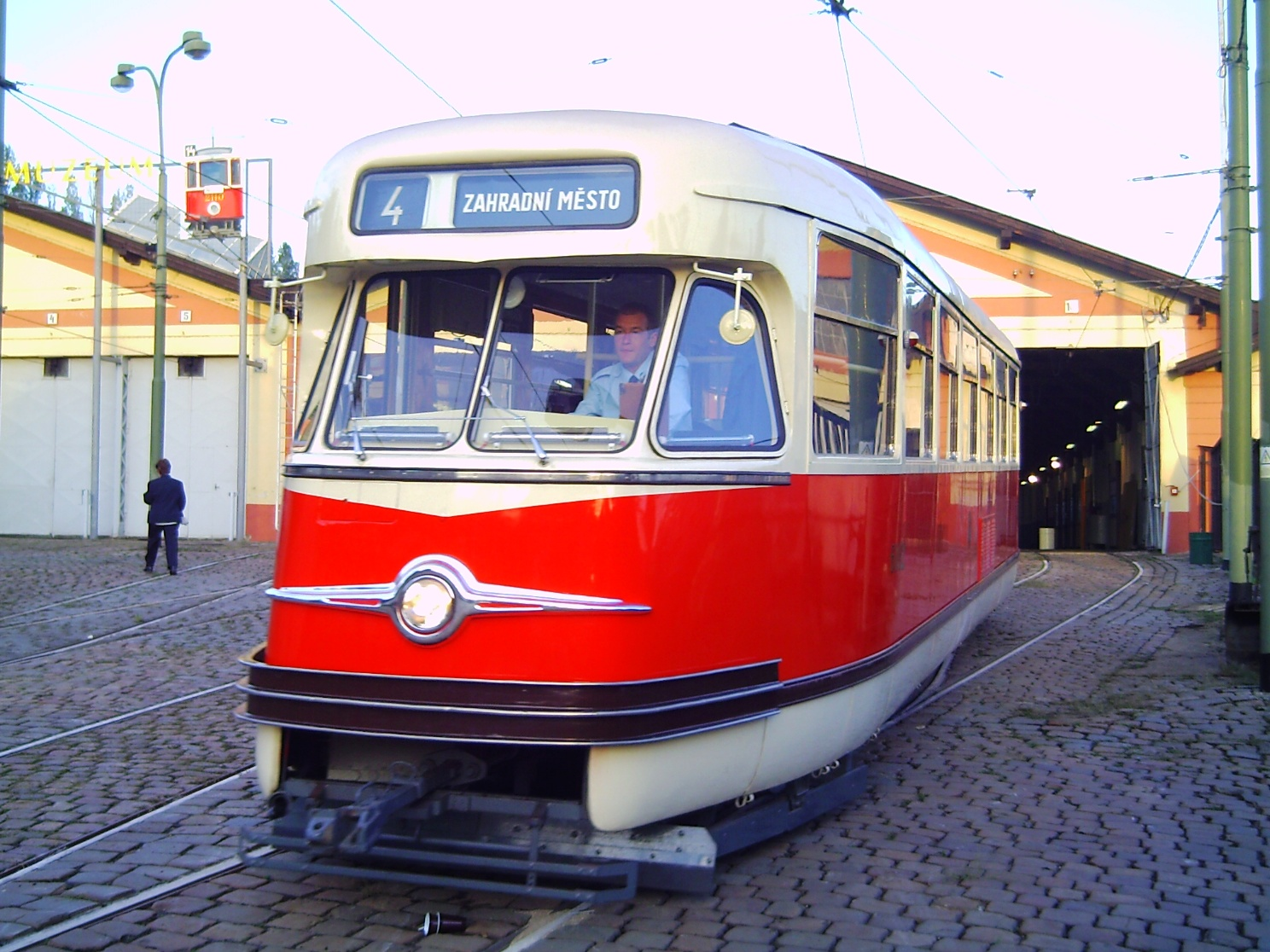
Historical T2 tram in Prague

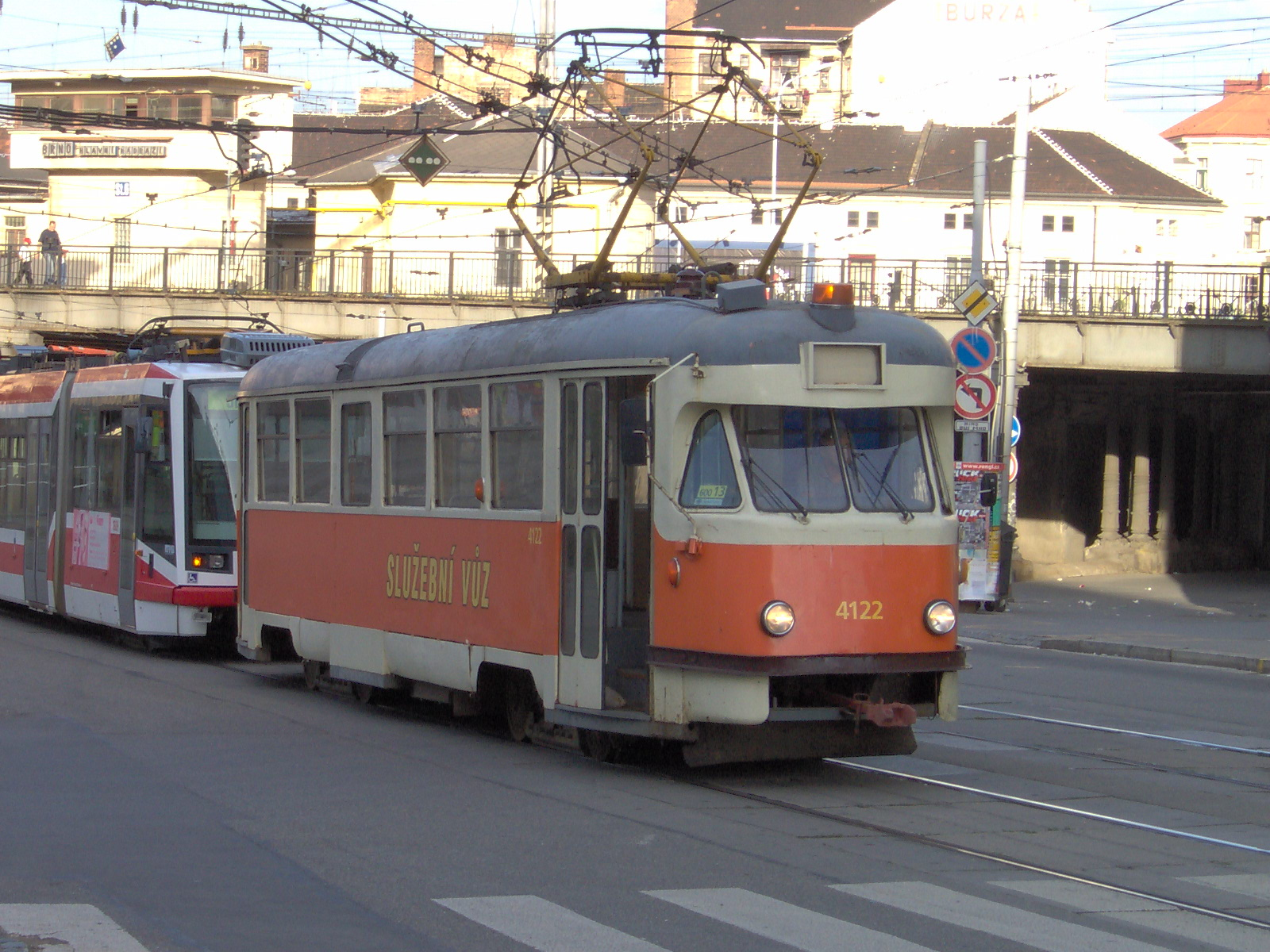
Tatra T2R service tram in Brno
