= Trams in Liberec and Jablonec nad Nisou =

Interurban tram system in Liberec nad Jablonec and Nisou, Czechia

Liberec tram network
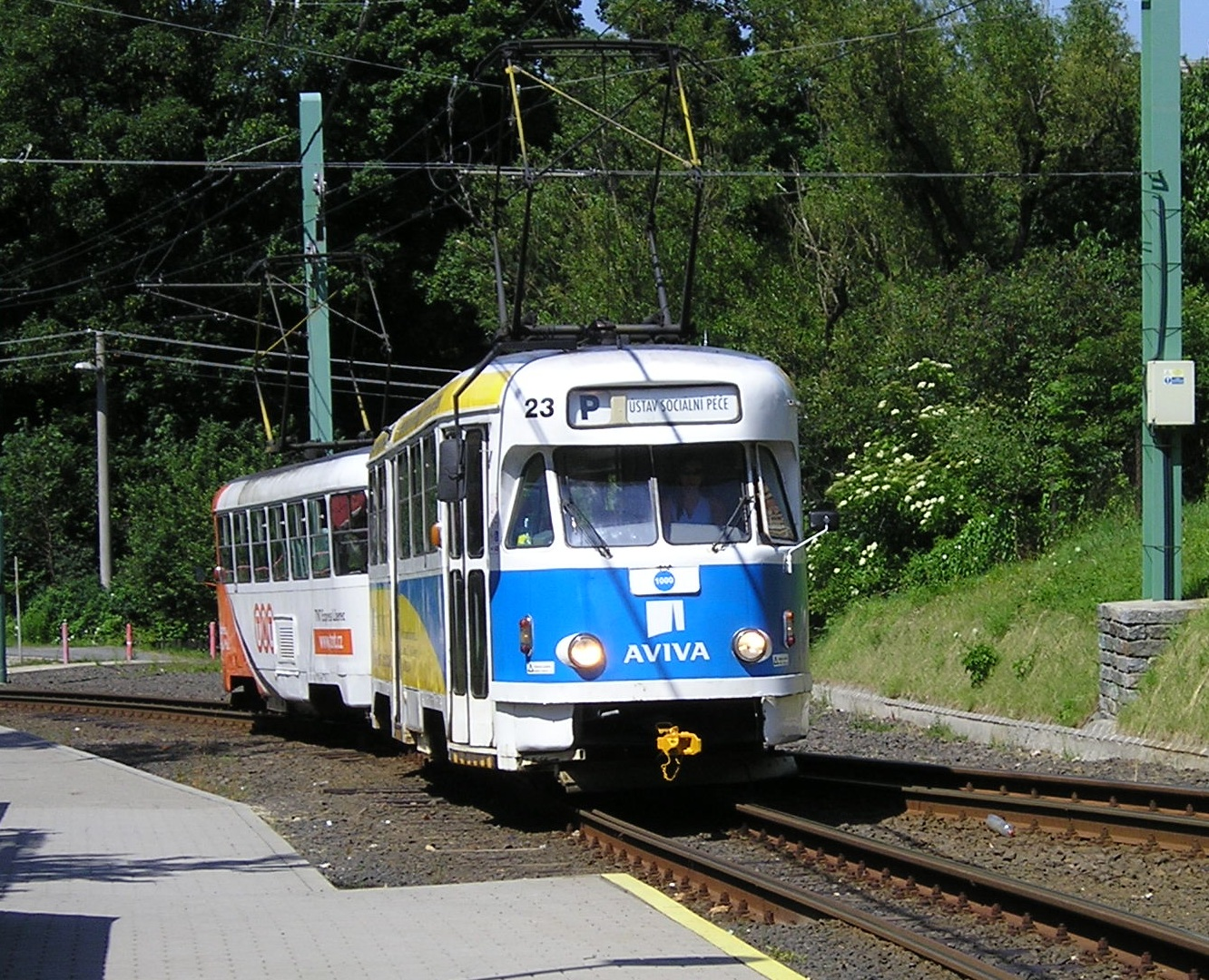
- A set of T2R cars on former line P in front of the Nová Ruda stop

Operation
- Locale: Liberec and Jablonec nad Nisou, Czech Republic
- Open: 1897
- Status: Operational
- Routes: 4
- Operator: Dopravní podnik měst Liberce a Jablonce nad Nisou

Infrastructure
- Track gauge: 1,435 mm (4 ft 8 1/2 in)
- Electrification: 600 V DC
- Stock: 67 tram vehicles

Statistics
- Track length (single): 21.5 km (13.4 mi)
- Route length: 37 km (23 mi)
- 2016: 12.7 million (2016)
- Website: http://www.dpmlj.cz DPMLJ

The city of Liberec is one of the seven cities in the Czech Republic where tram transport is present. The tram system is conjoined with an interurban tramway branch to Jablonec nad Nisou. It is operated by Dopravní podnik měst Liberce a Jablonce nad Nisou, a.s. The track system is approximately 21.5 km (13.4 mi) long with the branch between Liberec and Jablonec nad Nisou measuring around 13 km (8 mi).

Narrow-gauge tracks were used since inception of the system in 1898 and a part of the network was decommissioned in the 1960s. A gradual reconstruction of the city line took place in the 1990s, where tracks were reconstructed to standard-gauge railway.

The branch between Liberec and Jablonec nad Nisou was out of service from July 2021 to May 2024 for upgrading and regauging to bring the network to an all standard-gauge track. It reopened on 1 May 2024.

== History ==
=== Early years ===
On 11 September 1894, the Liberec City Council approved a proposal for the construction of an electric tram line with a 1,000 mm (3 ft 3 3/8 in) metre gauge.

It was at a time when the only tram operation in the territory of today's Czech Republic was in Prague (Křižík's electric railway at Letná). Construction began in May 1897 and the line was completed three months later. On 25 August 1897, the first line in Liberec was inaugurated.

Separate proposals for a tram connection between Liberec and Jablonec nad Nisou appeared, and the initiative was led mainly by the Jablonec Electric Railways, with the Ministry of Railways rejecting the proposals for many years due to the existence of a parallel railway line. The electric tram quickly became the main mode of transport in Liberec, carrying 800,000 passengers in 1898. New lines to Rochlice (1899), to Růžodol I (1904) and Horní Hanychov (1912) were built.

The tram expansion was halted by World War I. Many employees enlisted and passenger operation was reduced significantly. Trams were also used to transport wounded soldiers to the city hospitals.

=== Interwar period ===
Meetings took place to introduce three new lines, but no new tracks were built in the end. On 13 December 1924, line numbering was also introduced for the first time. In 1929, the network transported 8 million passengers, however, during the economic crisis the number dropped to 5.4 million and income losses of 1 million crowns had to be solved by placing advertising boards on cars. In 1930s, the line ending in Růžodol was extended by about 700 metres to the Letka restaurant, and in 1934, a connecting line was created from the station to the viaduct.

The signing of the Munich Agreement meant that Liberec was seized and annexed by Nazi Germany. On 8 October 1938, Nazi troops entered the city and tram traffic was interrupted. In turn, Liberec was established as the county town of the Reichsgau Sudetenland.

=== Socialist era ===
On 10 March 1949, Dopravní podnik měst Liberce a Jablonce nad Nisou, a.s. was incorporated as the operator connecting tram systems in Liberec and Jablonec nad Nisou. The main construction that took place in Liberec tram transport after World War II was the interconnection of the Jablonec and Liberec tram networks in 1955 according to plans that had been in existence since around 1900s.

Construction on the Liberec–Jablonec tramway started in 1947 and the line was finished in 1954 as a 1,000 mm (3 ft 3 3/8 in) single-track railway becoming operational on 1 January 1955. 6MT type trams were used on the line delivered from Česká Lípa. On 31 October 1960, the lines to Rochlice and Růžodol were decommissioned and within three years, all tracks on the lines disappeared. In the 70s, the intercity line to Jablonec was completely reconstructed.

At the end of the 1980s, the need to adjust the track gauge from 1,000 mm (3 ft 3 3/8 in) metre gauge to 1,435 mm (4 ft 8 1/2 in) standard gauge began to appear increasingly important as it was present in all cities of the then Czechoslovakia (except Bratislava which still to this day runs on 1,000 mm (3 ft 3 3/8 in) metre gauge).

=== Recent times ===
The reconstruction of track gauge did not take place until the 1990s. The reconstruction took place in several stages from 1990 to 1998. On 14 August 1998, the first trams on the 1435 mm gauge were put into operation in Liberec.

After the turn of the millennium, T2 and T3 trams were modernized. Most T2R cars were decommissioned before 2006. After 2006, only a couple of modernized T2R trams remained in operation. Deliveries of Tatra's T3 PLF low-floor variant followed between 2005 and 2007. In 2012, a prototype of the EVO2 tram was put into operation, which remains the only EVO2 in Liberec as of today.

On 17 November 2018, the last two operating Tatra T2 trams in the world, the T2R cars No. 18 and 19, were retired.

On 17 July 2021, trams on the 1,000 mm (3 ft 3 3/8 in) metre gauge were in regular operation for the last time on the interurban line to Jablonec nad Nisou. The next day, construction work began on the regauging of the section U Lomu – Vratislavice. Operation on the normal gauge line to Vratislavice was resumed on 6 November 2021. Vratislavice - Jablonec section reopened on May 1 2024.

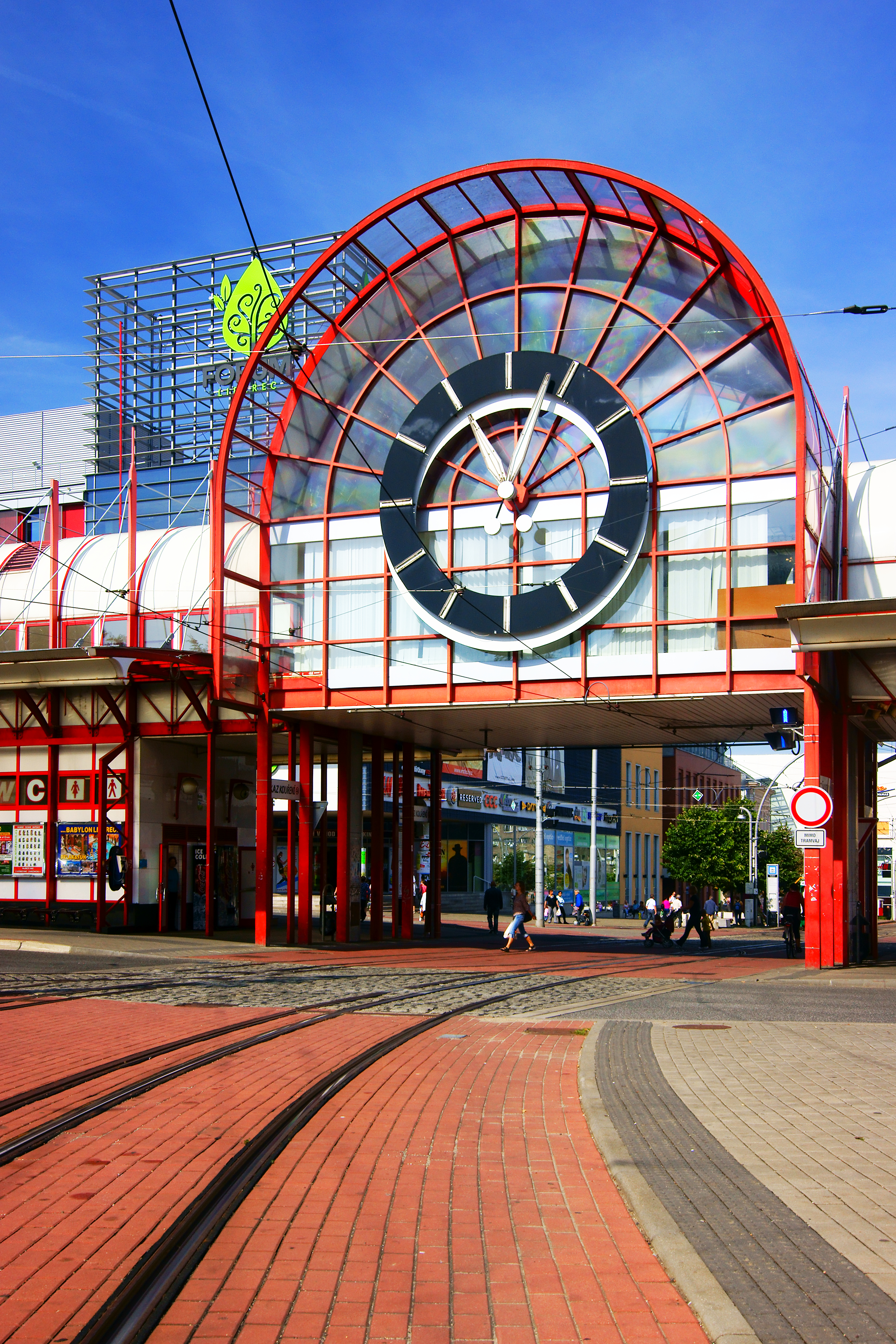
Fügnerova Station in Liberec where all routes converge

== Routes ==
=== Liberec services ===
All Liberec services converge at the central tram point, Fügnerova station.

Tram	Route
2	Lidové sady-ZOO ↔ Fügnerova ↔ Dolní Hanychov
3	Lidové sady-ZOO ↔ Fügnerova ↔ Dolní Hanychov ↔ Horní Hanychov
5	Rybníček ↔ Fügnerova ↔ Vratislavice nad Nisou

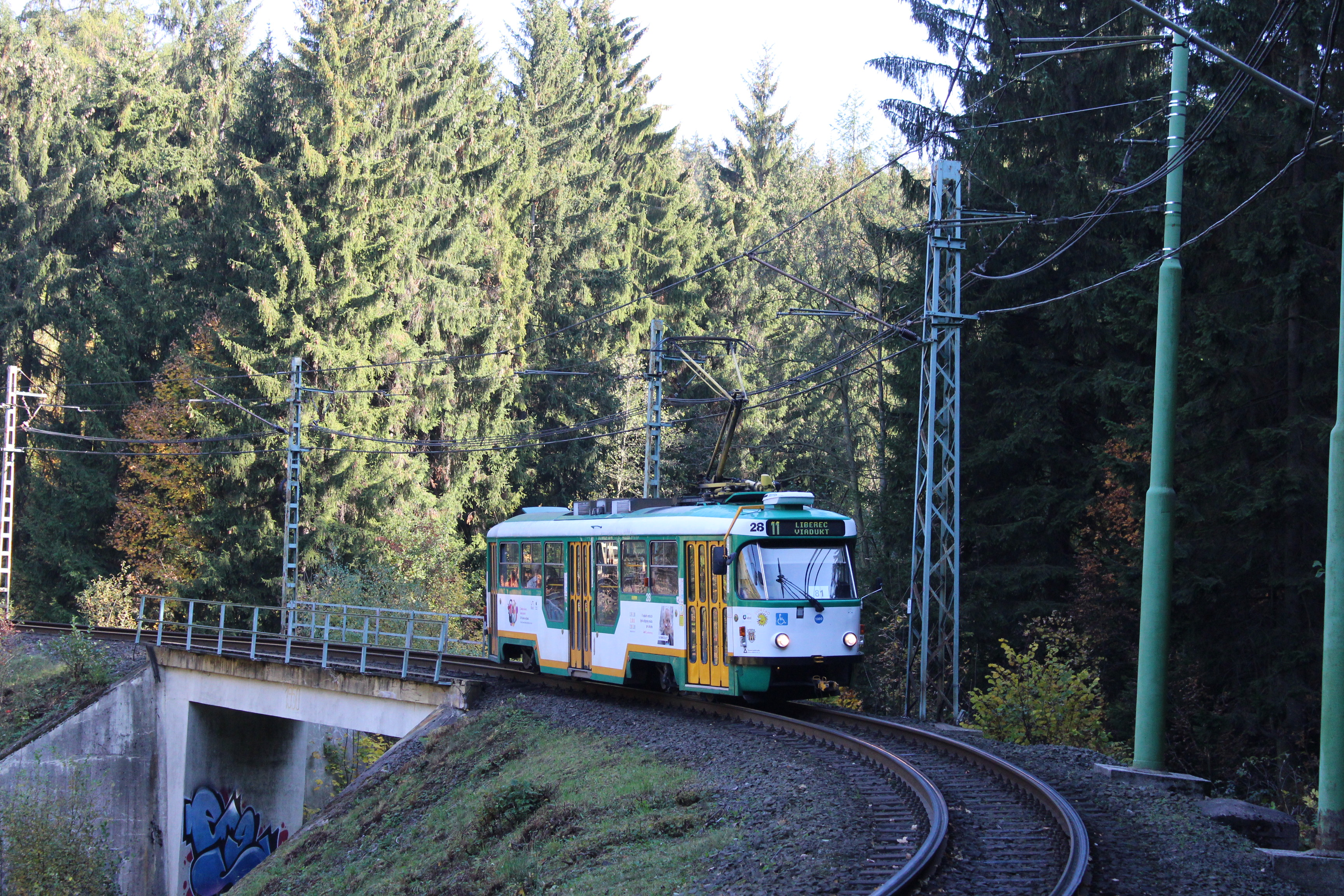
Tatra T3R.PLF at Zelené Údolí on the Liberec–Jablonec tramway

=== Interurban services ===
There is one service on the Liberec and Jablonec nad Nisou track; line 11. The journey takes around 30 minutes. It was closed for regauging from metre to standard gauge in July 2021 and was reopened in May 2024.

Other similar interurban tramway lines in the Czech Republic include Most–Litvínov, Ostrava–Kyjovice and Brno–Modřice.

Tram	Route
11	Liberec, Fügnerova ↔ Vratislavice nad Nisou ↔ Jablonec nad Nisou, Tyršovy Sady

=== Ticketing ===
Regular Liberec public transport tariffs apply both on Liberec and Jablonec services as all lines are part of the public transport network in Liberec. In the past, there was a zone tariff on the Liberec–Jablonec line and for this reason, conductors were still operating at a time when operation without conductors was already introduced in Liberec and other Czech cities. All tramcars are equipped with ticket vending machines.

== Rolling stock ==
Image	Type	Subtypes	Delivered	In service
Tatra T3R.PV	Tatra T3	Tatra T3SUCS	1987 (1986–1987)	4
Tatra T3R.PV	Tatra T3	Tatra T3M.04	1996–1999	19
Tatra T3R.PV	Tatra T3	Tatra T3R.P	2003–2005	5
Tatra T3R.PV	Tatra T3	Tatra T3R.PV	2003–2008	12
Tatra T3R.PV	Tatra T3	Tatra T3R.PLF	2005–2007	12
Tatra T3R.PV	Tatra T3	Tatra T3R.SLF	2012–2021	10
EVO2	EVO2	EVO2	2012 (2012)	1

== See also ==
- History of Liberec
- List of tram and light rail transit systems
- List of town tramway systems in the Czech Republic
