= Trams in Olomouc =

Tram system in Olomouc, Czech Republic

Olomouc tramway network
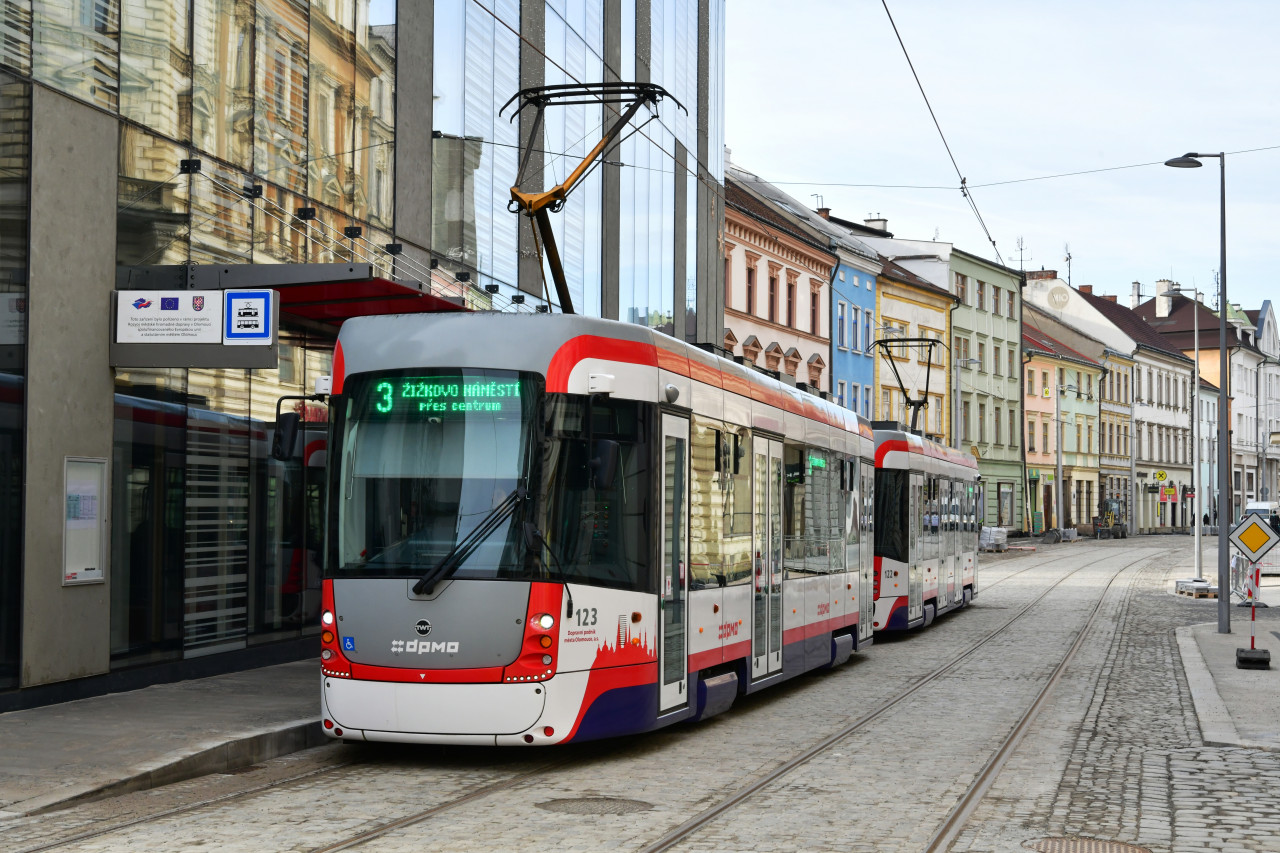
- EVO 1/o tram in central Olomouc

Operation
- Locale: Olomouc, Czech Republic
- Open: 1899
- Status: Operational
- Routes: 7
- Operator: Dopravní podnik města Olomouce

Infrastructure
- Track gauge: 1,435 mm (4 ft 8 1/2 in)
- Electrification: 600 V DC
- Stock: 69 tram vehicles

Statistics
- Track length (single): 15 km (9.3 mi)
- Route length: 39 km (24 mi)
- 2017: 25.7 million (2017)
Overview
Map of the network in 2023
- Website: https://www.dpmo.cz DPMO

The Olomouc tramway network (Czech: Tramvajová doprava v Olomouci) is a standard-gauge tram system located in Olomouc, Czech Republic. Seven lines operate on approximately 16 kilometres (9.9 mi) of track, which makes it the smallest tramway network by length in the Czech Republic. It is operated by Dopravní podnik města Olomouce (DPMO; Transport Company of the City of Olomouc), and integrated in the Integrovaný dopravní systém Olomouckého kraje (IDSOK; Integrated Transport System of the Olomouc Region). As of 2022, DPMO had a total of 69 tram vehicles intended for regular passenger transport.

== History ==
=== Beginning ===
Olomouc was served by horse-drawn omnibuses since 1845. Work began on a standard-gauge electric tram in 1897 and the first line opened to public on 1 April 1899.

=== Early 20th century ===
In 1904, the city terminated contracts with private operators and took over tram lines. There were no changes in the scope of the network. Work on all unfinished track was immediately stopped (with the exception of the track to the new cemetery in Neředín, opened on 3 October 1914) due to World War I. After the proclamation of the republic four years later, modernization was required. In 1923, lines received numerical designations. In the 1930s, the line from Neředín to the military airport became the first (and so far the only) tram line to an airport in the whole of Czechoslovakia.

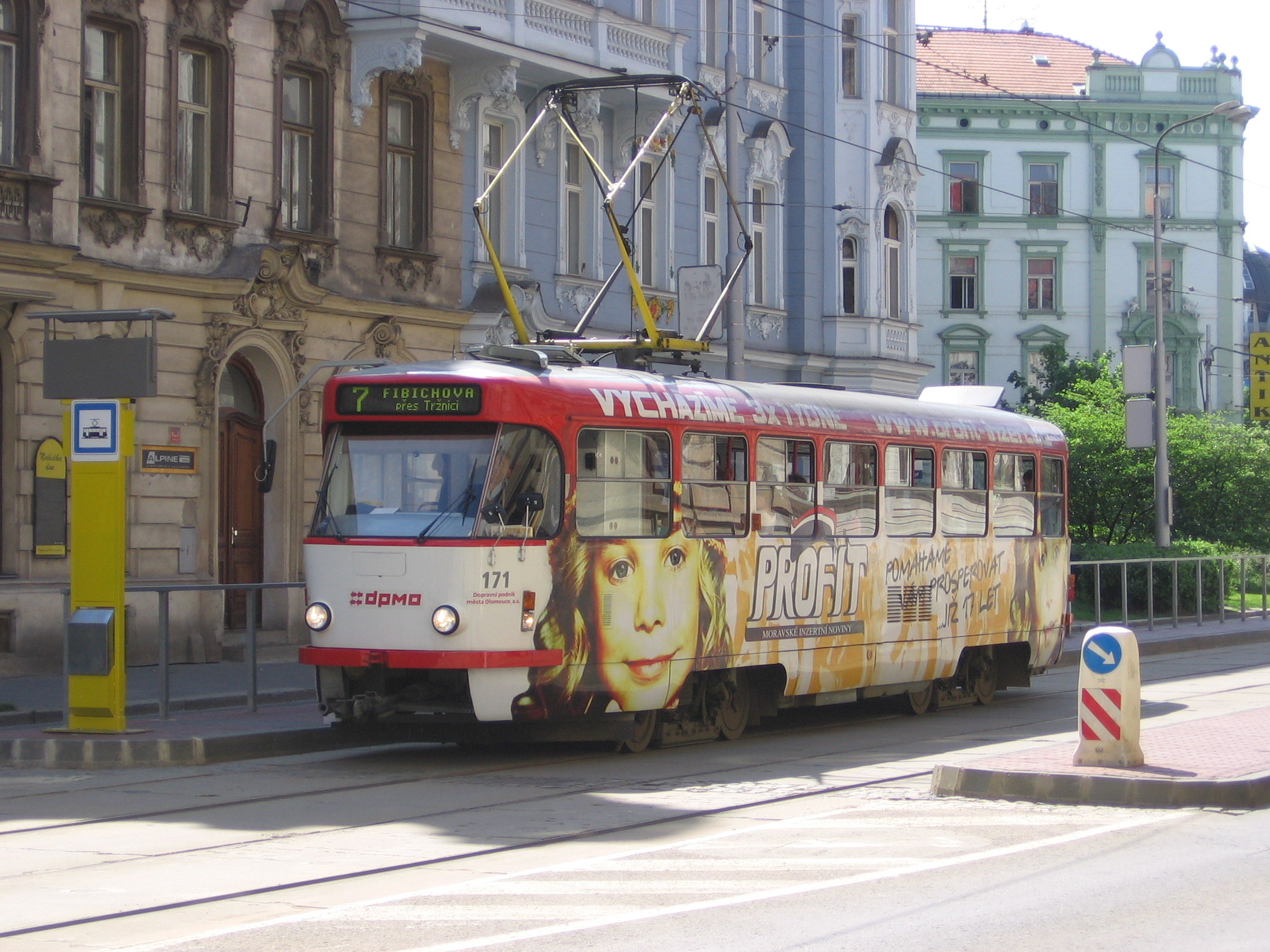
Tatra T3R.P in Olomouc

=== Late 20th century ===
The track to the military airport was deemed unnecessary and was decommissioned in 1953. With it, a loop was created in Neředín. In 1957, an extension on the line to Pavlovičky was put into operation.

Between 1947 and 1967, a large number of older cars were purchased from Prague. In 1957, the first PCC trams were delivered - ten Tatra T1 cars. In the early 1960s, five Tatra T2 trams also appeared in Olomouc. However, the significant renewal of the fleet began only with the delivery of Tatra T3 vehicles in the second half of the 1960s.

As in other cities at the time, such as Ústí nad Labem or České Budějovice, there were proposals to decommission tram transport and replace it with buses, although this never happened. In 1981, a major reconstruction of the track took place on Nová street.

In the 1990s, new low-floor tram cars were added (Škoda 03T, also known as Astra). On 29 October 1998, a new zoning plan was adopted by the Olomouc City Council which reassured the future of trams as the backbone of the city transport. In 1999, the tram system in Olomouc celebrated its hundredth birthday.

=== Recent times ===
From 1 September 2007, line 5 which led from Pavlovičky around the main train station via Tržnice to Neředín was closed.

By the end of August 2007, a six-month reconstruction of Denisova and Pekařská streets in the city center was complete. The tram track bed was soundproofed using a rubber mat base and the track structure was also replaced. The total cost of the reconstruction amounted to CZK 105 million of which over CZK 30 million was spent on tram traction.

In June 2012, the construction of a new 1.4 km long line began, which lead from Šantovka, through Velkomoravská Street to the intersection of Rooseveltova and Trnkova Streets in the Nové Sady district. This first stage with three stops (Šantovka, V Kotlině and Trnkova) was put into operation on 29 November 2013. The operator purchased 14 new double-sided VarioLF plus/o wagons.

In March 2021, DPMO started the construction of the second stage of the line to Nové Sady. The 1.2 km (0.75 mi) long section is to be put into operation in Autumn 2022.

== Routes ==
In 2022, this was the list of routes:

Tram	Line	Notes
1	Fibichova ↔ Nová Ulice	travel time 18 minutes, operation ends around 21.00, 15 min interval
2	Fibichova ↔ Neředín, krematorium	travel time 19 minutes, 15 min interval
3	Fibichova ↔ Náměstí Hrdinů ↔ U Kapličky	travel time 25 minutes
4	Pavlovičky ↔ Nová Ulice	travel time 28 minutes, 15 min interval
5	Fibichova ↔ U Kapličky	travel time 15 minutes, operation on weekdays ends around 19.00, 30 min interval
6	Fibichova ↔ Nová Ulice	travel time 20 minutes, runs only on working days from about 6.00 to 18.00, 15 min interval
7	Fibichova ↔ Neředín, krematorium	travel time 20 minutes, operation ends between 20.00 and 21.00, 15 min interval

=== Ticketing ===
Passengers must buy and validate a ticket immediately after boarding a vehicle. There are plainclothes fare inspectors who randomly check passengers' tickets within the paid area; they are equipped with an inspection badge and carrier ID. On night lines 50, 51, 52 the passengers are required to board through first door of the bus and show their ticket to the driver. Olomouc operates ticketing under one single Zone 71. Adult tickets cost 25 CZK (as of 1 June 2025) for a 40-minute ride on a weekday, or a 60-minute ride on weekends. Reduced fare of 12 CZK applies to children up to 18 years of age. Transport is free for children under age of 6 accompanied by an adult, and for people aged 65 and over with an proof of age. SMS and electronic mobile phone tickets are also available.

== Rolling stock ==
The following types of passenger tram cars run in Olomouc:

Image	Type	Subtypes	Delivered	In service (as of 09/06/2022)
Tatra T3R.P	Tatra T3	Tatra T3R.P	1983–1987	18
Škoda 03T	Škoda 03T	Škoda 03T	1998–1999	4
Inekon 01 Trio	Inekon 01 Trio	Inekon 01 Trio	2006	2
VarioLF.E	VarioLF	VarioLF.E	2006–2007	3
VarioLF.E	VarioLF	VarioLFR.E	2008–2011	7
VarioLF.E	VarioLF	VarioLFR.S	2012–2020	11
VarioLF plus/o	VarioLF plus/o	VarioLF plus/o	2013	14
EVO1	EVO1	EVO1	2018	4
EVO1	EVO1	EVO1/o	2018–2022	4

== See also ==
- History of Olomouc
- List of tram and light rail transit systems
- List of town tramway systems in the Czech Republic
