= Trams in Plzeň =

Tram system in Plzeň, Czech Republic

Plzeň tramway network Plzeňská tramvajová síť
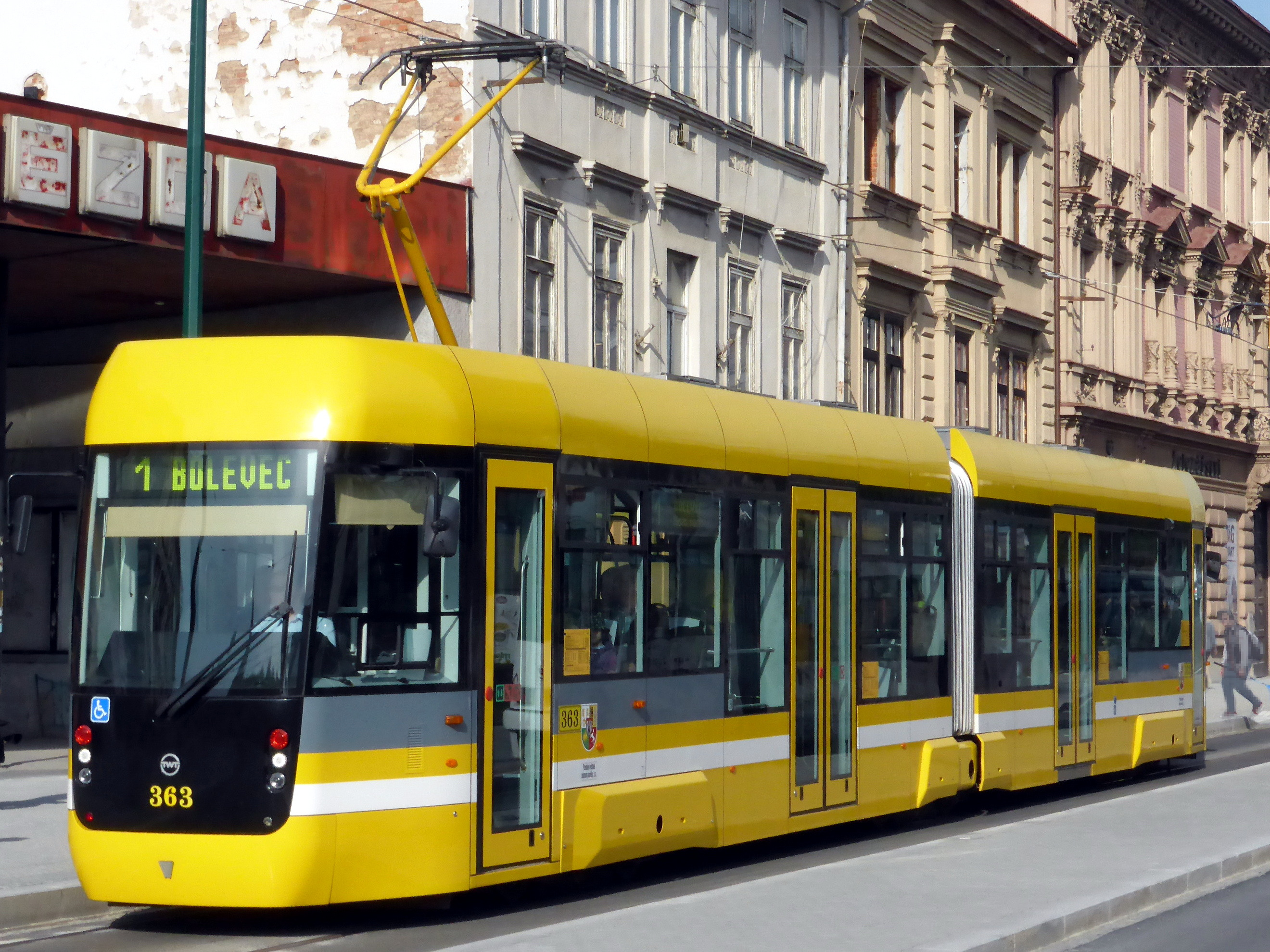
- VarioLF2/2 tram in Plzeň

Operation
- Locale: Plzeň, Czech Republic
- Open: 1899
- Status: Operational
- Routes: 3
- Operator: Plzeňské městské dopravní podniky

Infrastructure
- Track gauge: 1,435 mm (4 ft 8 1/2 in)
- Electrification: 600 V DC
- Stock: 116 tram vehicles

Statistics
- Track length (single): 21.7 km (13.5 mi)
- Route length: 23.9 km (14.9 mi)
- 2017: 38.5 million (2017)
Overview
- Website: http://www.pmdp.cz PMDP

The Plzeň tram network (Czech: Tramvajová doprava v Plzni) is a tram network serving Plzeň, the fourth most populous city in the Czech Republic.

The network is 21.7 km (13.5 mi) long with tramcars running on a standard-gauge railway. The system is operated by Plzeňské městské dopravní podniky (PMDP). Using just three lines, Plzeň trams still account for about 45% of the total volume of public transport in the city, forming the backbone of the city's transport system.

== History ==
=== Early days ===
In the 19th century Plzeň, thanks to new industrial enterprises, the town was growing so fast that it needed an acute solution to the difficult traffic situation, as horse-drawn carriages could no longer provide reliable transport. František Křižík drew up the plans for an electric tramway; his company then carried out the construction of the line partly with Škoda. Construction began in 1896 and was finished three years later.

The first section was inaugurated on 29 June 1899. The entire network consisted of three single-track lines (Bory–Lochotín, Skvrňany–Nepomucka třída, Náměstí–Plynárna), with the tram depot established at Cukrovarská Street.

=== Early 20th century ===
In 1910 and 1929 the line to Plynárna was extended. Line numbering was introduced in 1925. The section to Nepomucka Avenue was double-tracked at the end of the 1920s. A few years later, the lines in Skvrňany and Slovany (to today's loop) were also extended. In 1937, end loops at Bory and Slovany were built. The fleet of trams was also expanding, with new trams appearing bought from Prague Electric Works.

=== Late 20th century ===
After World War II, the section to Skvrňany was double-tracked and in 1949 the entire tram line Lochotín–Doudlevce was cancelled and replaced by trolleybuses. Tracks have been expanded along Rokycanská Avenue.

At the turn of the 1950s and 1960s, new housing estates began to be built that required transport connections, which pushed the authorities for the further development of the network. The tram line to Světovar was opened in 1962, and the Skvrňany housing estate was connected to the tram network in 1973. Košutka and Bolevec, in the north of the city, have had a tram line to replace the inadequate trolleybus service since the 1980s; not long after a large housing estate was built there. However, the Bolevec line was not completed in its entirety at this time, but only halfway; it has only been serving the public in its present form (including the northern section) since 1990.

After the war, Plzeň purchased a few more monorails and a few older trams from Prague. In the 1950s, the first modern four-axle cars of the PCC concept – Tatra T1 – were delivered. In the early 1960s, they were followed by Tatra T2 trams and a little later by the legendary "the three", which became the basis of the Plzeň tram fleet. Plzeň was also the last city in the world to see the arrival of T1 cars, in April 1987. Two years later, 12 Tatra KT8D5 three-cell cars were also delivered.

=== Post-communism ===
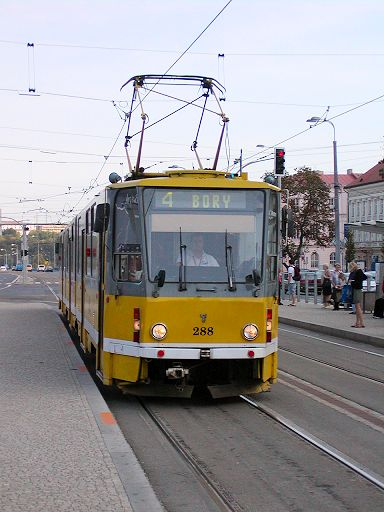
Tatra KT8D5 on the streets of Plzeň

After the coup in 1989, there were no major changes in the extent of the tram network; only the line routing changed so that three lines are now in operation from the original five.

On the other hand, the rolling stock has undergone major changes. The first trams were modernised (Škoda 01T, Tatra T3R.P), and the production of trams was launched by Škoda from Plzeň, which delivered 11 Škoda 03T low-floor cars to its home town. Other types such as the Škoda 10T for the American city of Portland or the Škoda 14T for Prague also appeared on the rail network as part of the manufacturer's test runs.

In 2007, the first Plzeň three-cell tram KT8D5 was upgraded to the partially low-floor Tatra KT8D5R.N2P type. In March 2008, the partially low-floor new-build Tatra T3R.PLF appeared in service for the first time. Since 2010, VarioLF and VarioLF plus cars have been delivered, and in 2013, the first articulated tram VarioLF2/2 IN was purchased.

== Routes ==
The network consists of three lines which all converge in Plzeň old town:

Tram	Line
1	Bolevec ↔ Slovany
2	Skvrňany ↔ Světovar
4	Košutka ↔ University

== See also ==
- History of Plzeň
- List of tram and light rail transit systems
- List of town tramway systems in the Czech Republic
