= Trams in Teschen =

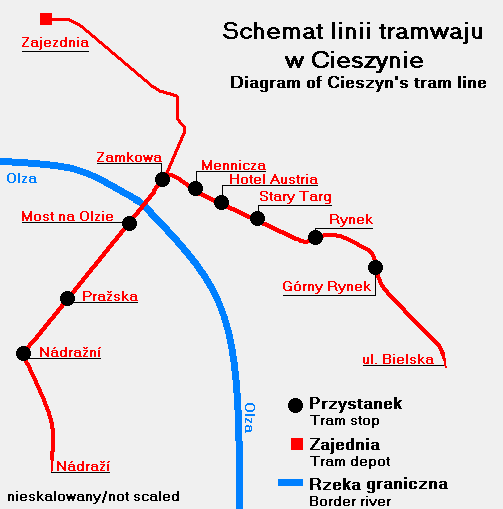

Overview
- Native name: Tramwaje w Cieszynie (in Polish)
- Locale: Teschen, Austria-Hungary (historical); Cieszyn, Poland (modern); Český Těšín, Czech Republic (modern)
- Transit type: Tram
- Number of lines: 1
- Number of stations: 11

Operation
- Began operation: 1911
- Ended operation: 1921

Technical
- System length: 1.793 km (1.11 mi)
- Track gauge: 1,000 mm (3 ft 3 3/8 in)

Trams in Teschen was a tramway system that operated in the former Austro-Hungarian town of Teschen (modern incarnation: Cieszyn, Poland and Český Těšín, Czechoslovakia) from 12 February 1911 to 2 April 1921.

== History ==
In 1910, the Košice–Bohumín Railway was built and town's administration decided to build a tramway from railway station to the town square. First tram started work on 12 February 1911 on the 1793-metres long way. There were four trams in Cieszyn built by Ringhoffer company from Prague. In 1920, the town was divided into two parts between the newly created states of Czechoslovakia and Poland, and on 2 April 1921 trams were defunct and trams were sold to Łódź.

== See also ==
- Trams in Cieszyn 1911-1921
