= Trams in Most and Litvínov =

Tram system in Most and Litvínov, Czech Republic

Most-Litvínov tramway network
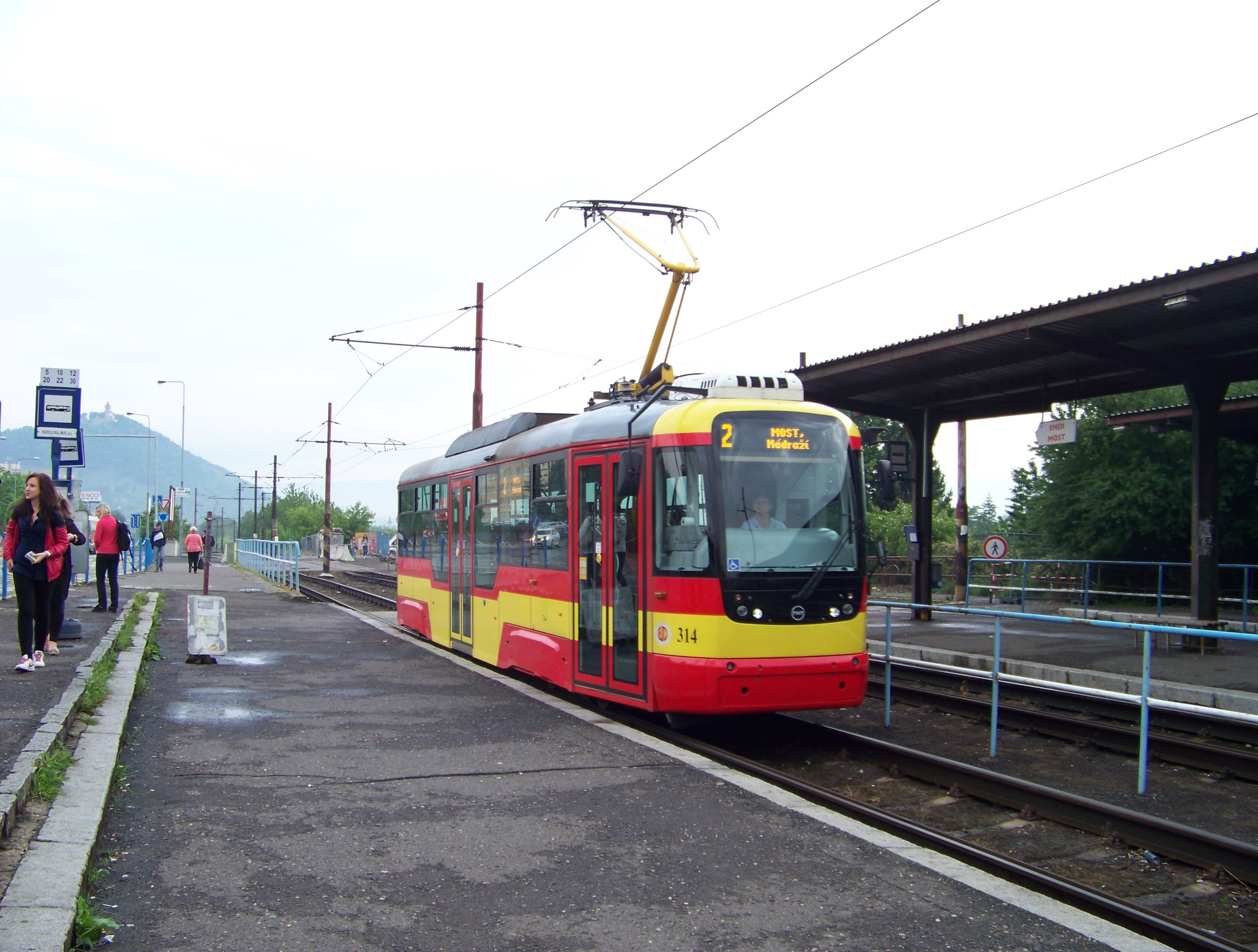
- Vario LF tram

Operation
- Locale: Most and Litvínov, Czech Republic
- Open: 1901
- Status: Operational
- Routes: 4
- Operator: Dopravní podnik měst Mostu a Litvínova

Infrastructure
- Track gauge: 1,435 mm (4 ft 8 1/2 in)
- Electrification: 600 V DC
- Stock: 48 tram vehicles

Statistics
- Track length (single): 18.6 km (11.6 mi)
- Route length: 74 km (46 mi)
- 2017: 1.5 million (2017)

The Most-Litvínov tramway network (Czech: Tramvajová doprava v Mostě a v Litvínově) is a tram network connecting the city of Most and the town of Litvínov in the Ústí nad Labem Region. With a 1,435 mm (4 ft 8 1/2 in) standard gauge track and a length of approximately 18.6 kilometres (11.6 mi), the system is operated by Dopravní podnik měst Mostu a Litvínova.

This network is unique in Europe; since tram networks are typically designed to provide public transport for cities, this system is unique for connecting two towns of a combined population of less than 80,000 inhabitants.

== History ==
=== Early 20th century ===
The city of Most strived to become an important center in the area, but there was a lack of functioning local transport. Absence of transport infrastructure in densely populated and built-up agglomeration, which was formed between Most and Litvínov at the end of the century required a progressive solution. In 1893, Carl von Pohnert considered connecting two towns by road steam tram. Pohnert submitted the idea in 1896 and on 22 February 1899, the project received (by decree no. 570682/3) permission from the railways ministry to start construction.

On 7 August 1901, the operation of the 1,000 mm (3 ft 3 3/8 in) single-track railway was inaugurated. In September 1902, Brüxer Strassenbahn-und Elektricitäts-Gesellschaft was founded.

The network was not extended any further until the end of World War II. In 1938, a smaller extension was made to the petrochemical plants in Záluží, a village that is a part of Litvínov. These were of strategic importance during World War II. Towards the end of the war, in 1945, the chemical plants in and around Most were bombed. Subsequently, the tramway was destroyed. The bombing caused a temporary split of the Litvínov and Most sections.

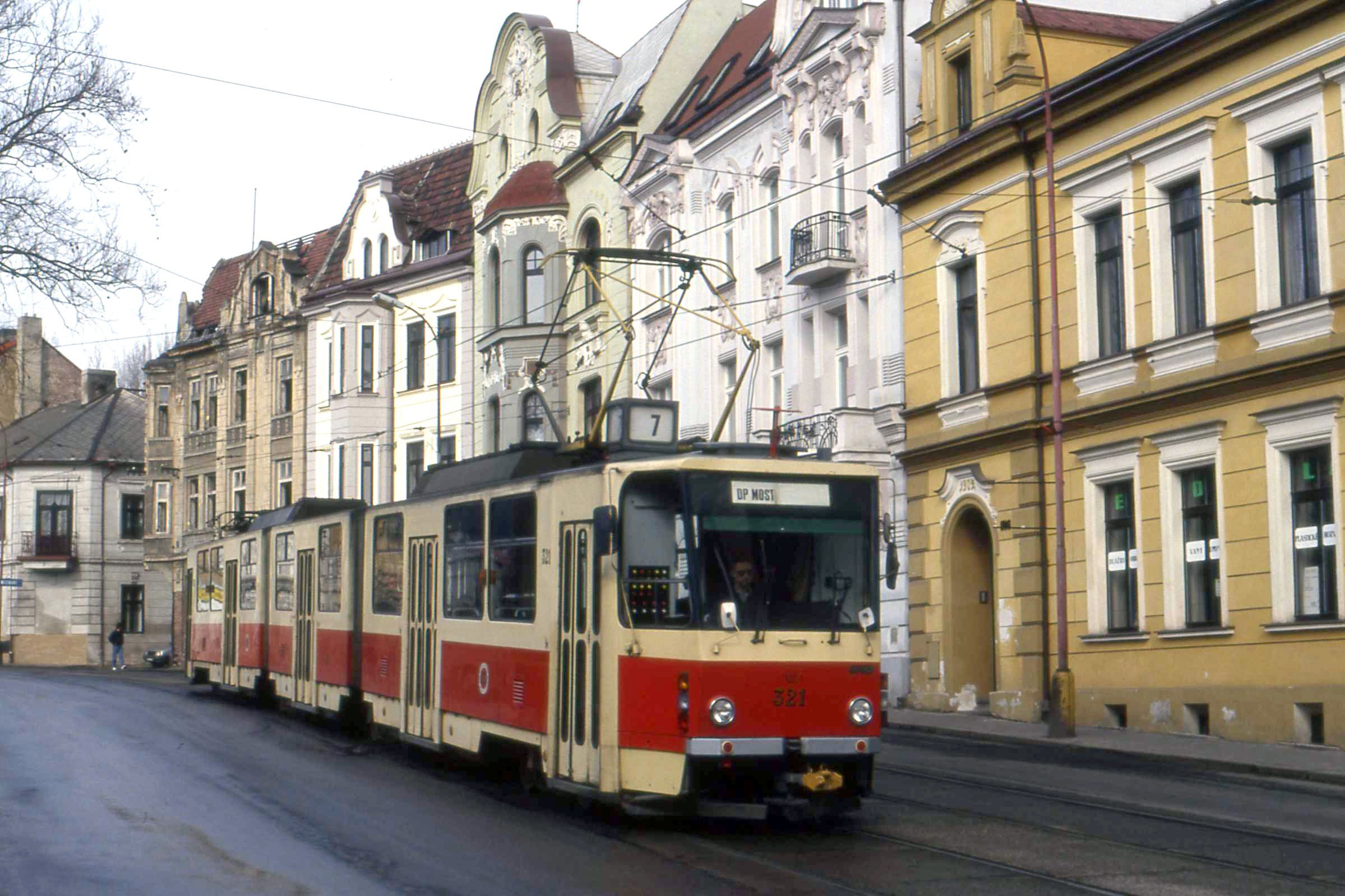
Three-cell tram KT8D5 in Litvínov (1994)

=== Late 20th century ===
After the war, reconstruction of tracks was necessary. This was done within a few months after the end of World War II.

In the 1950s, five tram lines were in operation in Most and new T1 trams appeared. Another important task was the modernisation of the interurban line. A decision was taken to build a modern, fast standard-gauge line. Its first section was put into operation in Litvínov on 1 April 1957. At the end of 1957, the network was 8.6 kilometres (5.3 mi) long.

In connection with this, the old tram cars of wooden construction had to be scrapped and were replaced by Tatra T1, T2 and later T3 trams.

Operation of narrow-gauge trams was definitively terminated on 24 March 1961. In the 1970s, the tram network as well as the whole city of Most, had to prepare for the relocation. However, thanks to previous modifications, the relocation turned out easy. In the same year, the line to the new Most railway station was also built.

On 1 January 1995, during the process of privatization of state-owned enterprises DOPRAVNÍ PODNIK měst Mostu a Litvínova, a.s. (referred to as DPmML) was established as successor to the state-owned enterprise.

=== Current status ===
Most of the fleet consists of modernised Tatra T3 trams, with two Škoda 03T low-floor cars also in service.

In 2012-2014, two low-floor VarioLF plus trams were delivered and a few years later, two VarioLF cars were also put into service. During 2013, the surplus Tatra T3SUCS cars were sold to various Ukraine tramway operations, especially to Odesa. Trams now run on four lines 1-4 with no plans to expand the network for the time being. A major project will be the complete; the reconstruction of the intercity rapid transit system which is expected to begin in 2020 and end two years later.

== Routes ==
Four routes feature on the network.

The tram lines 2 and 4 are the basis of the operation, with a connection between them at the stop "Most, Zimní stadion". During the peak hours of the working day, their connections are interspersed with line 3, which provides a direct connection between Litvínov and Most railway station. Lines 1 and 3 are variants of line 4. Until August 2011, line 7 was a variant of line 4 before its cancellation.

Tram	Route
1	Litvínov, Citadela ↔ Most, Velebudická
2	Most, nádraží ↔ Most, Velebudická
3	Litvínov, Citadela ↔ Most, nádraží
4	Litvínov, Citadela ↔ Most, Dopravní podnik

=== Intervals and frequency ===
- Line 1 operates only a few connections on weekdays (6 pairs in 2016), mostly from Litvínov to Most in the morning and mostly from Most to Litvínov in the afternoon.
- Line 2 central to the town of Most and line 4 between Most to Litvínov are most regular.
  - Both lines run daily at regular intervals with a 15-minute intervals for most of the working day, and mostly 30-minute intervals on Saturdays, Sundays and evenings.
- Two night services from Litvínov to Most and one night service from Most to Litvínov arrive at the railway station in Most - they are shown on the timetable for line 3.
- Two pairs of night services running daily are also listed as line 4 services.

== Rolling stock ==
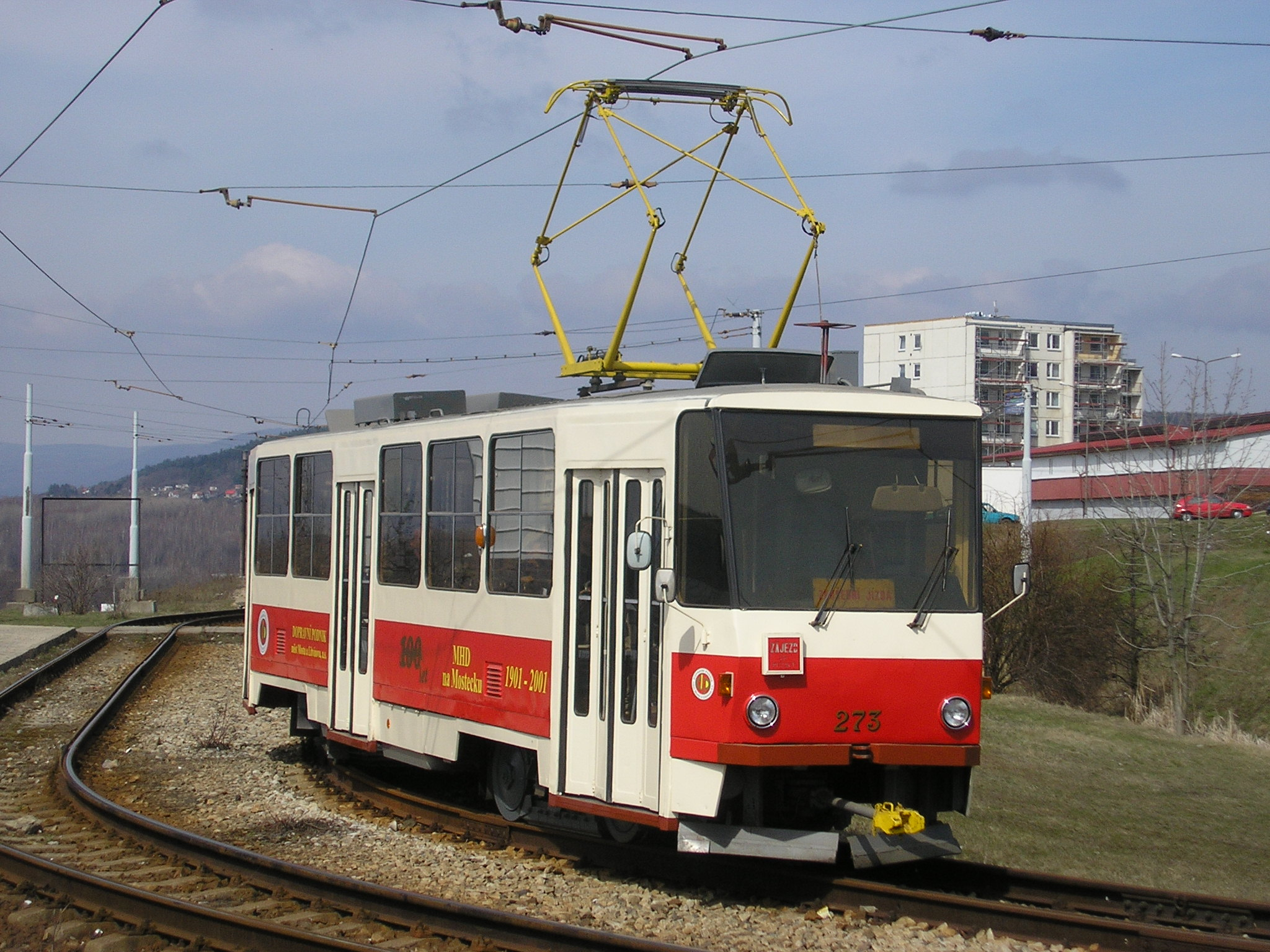
Historical tram Tatra T5B6

Currently, passenger trams of these types are in operation in Most and Litvínov:

Image	Type	Subtypes	Delivered	In service
Tatra T3M.3	Tatra T3	Tatra T3SUCS	1983	1
Tatra T3M.3	Tatra T3	Tatra T3M.3	1997–2001	34
Škoda 03T	Škoda 03T	Škoda 03T5 (Astra)	2001	1
	VarioLF plus	VarioLF plus	2012–2014	2
	EVO1	EVO1	2016	1
	VarioLF	VarioLFR.S	2016–2018	2
	EVO2	EVO2	2019-2020	5

The original prototype of the experimental Tatra T5B6 (carrying registration No. 273) as the only ever tramcar of this type to be produced is still in Most and Litvínov, however it does not see active service and is kept only as an historic vehicle.

== See also ==
- List of tram and light rail transit systems
- List of town tramway systems in the Czech Republic
