= Referendums in the Czech Republic =

Referendums in the Czech Republic can be held in the Czech Republic at a national, regional or local level. National referendums are very rare as there are no provisions concerning referendums in the Constitution of the Czech Republic, except for "referendum concerning the accession of the Czech Republic to the European Union" and the only national referendum in the Czech Republic was 2003 Czech European Union membership referendum. Local referendums are most common. As of 27 February 2018 there has been 269 local referendums since 2006. There hasn't been any regional referendum in the Czech Republic so far.

== List ==
Date	Topic	Level	Location
1951	Peace pact	National	Czechoslovakia
2003	European Union membership	National	Czech Republic
2013	Plzeň shopping center	Local	Plzeň
2013	City Hall	Local	Prague 7
2014	Ban of Gambling	Local	Olomouc
2014	Ban of Gambling	Local	Prague 1
2016	Central Station	Local	Brno
2016	Female Prison in Králíky	Local	Králíky
