= Austrian Northwestern Railway =

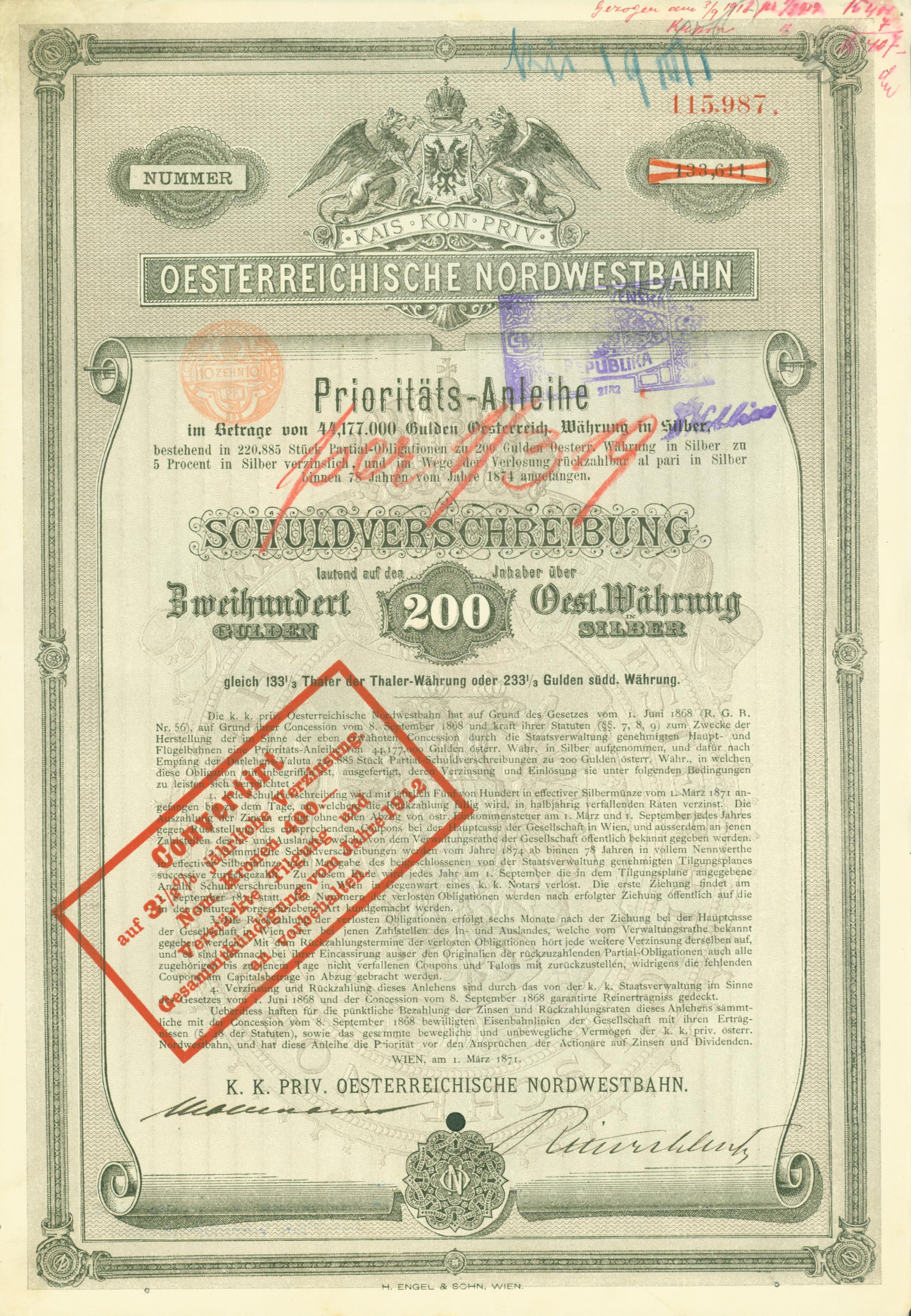
Bond of the Austrian Northwestern Railway, issued 1 March 1871

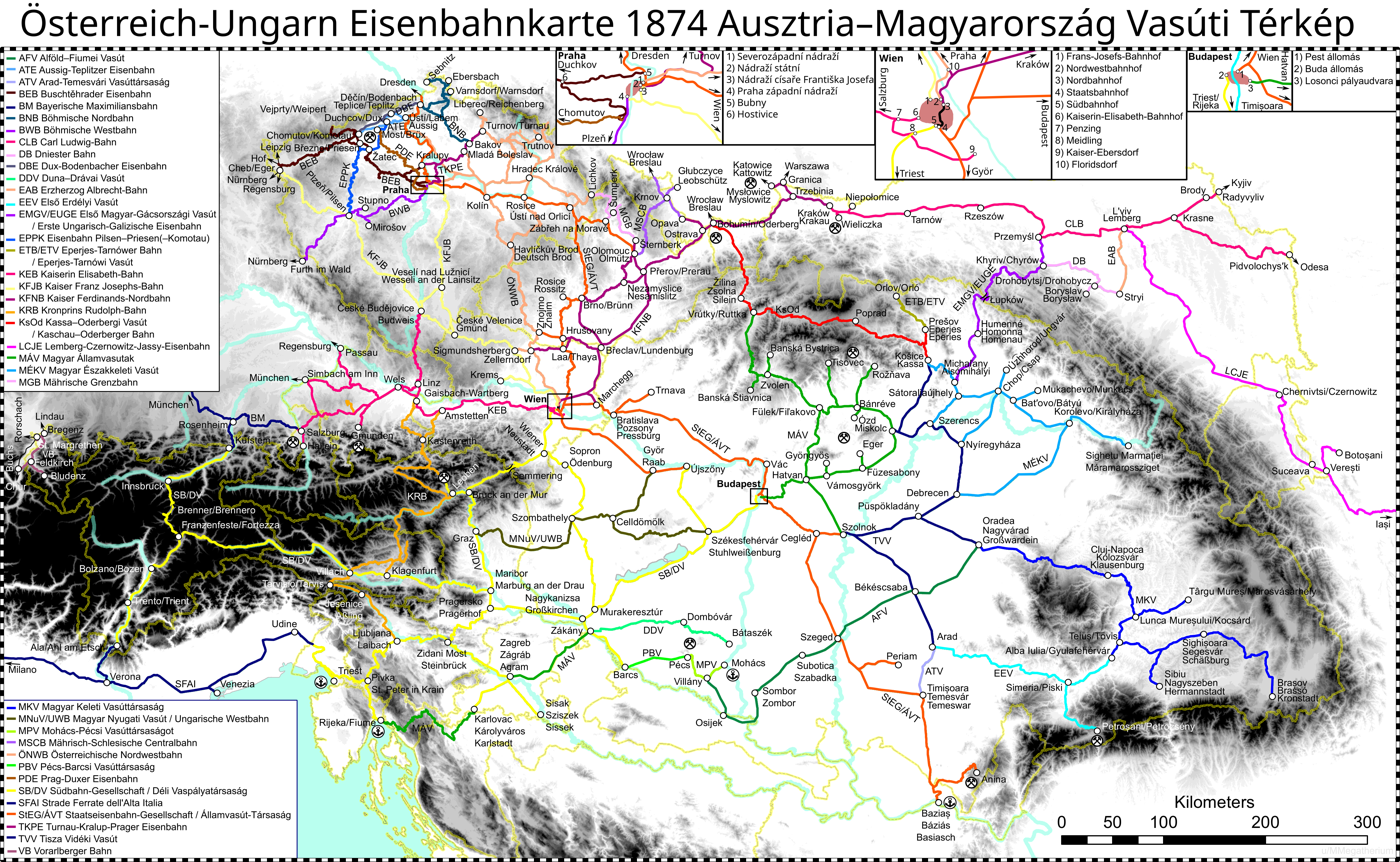
ÖNWB network in comparison to other railway companies.

The Austrian Northwestern Railway (German: Österreichische Nordwestbahn, ÖNWB, Czech: Rakouská severozápadní dráha) was the name of a former railway company during the time of the Austro-Hungarian monarchy. Today, the term is still used (although only rarely) to refer to the railway line which was formerly operated by that company.

The privately owned Nordwestbahn took over the branch of the Nordbahn from Floridsdorf to Stockerau in 1871 and extended it in 1871 via Hollabrunn and Retz to Znojmo (Moravia). Nordwestbahn owned and operated many important lines in Bohemia and Moravia. It was nationalized in 1908 and subsequently lost its significance. Nordwestbahnhof was closed down in 1924 and has only been used for freight transports since World War II. The bridge used by the company was transformed into an Autobahn bridge during the 60s. Passenger service between Retz and Znojmo was reopened in 1990.

== Lines built by Nordwestbahn lying in today's Czech Republic (Note: Current borders and place names are used) ==
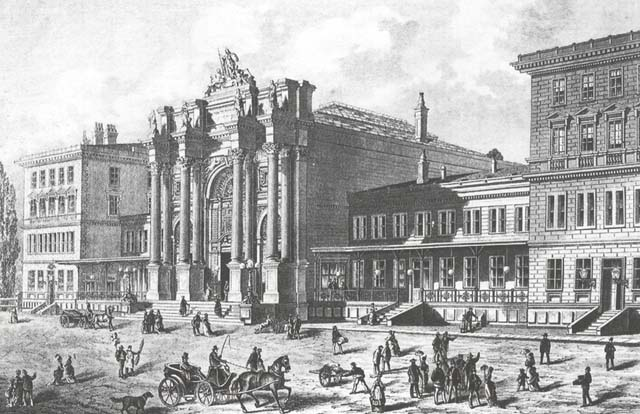
Drawing of railway station Prague-Těšnov

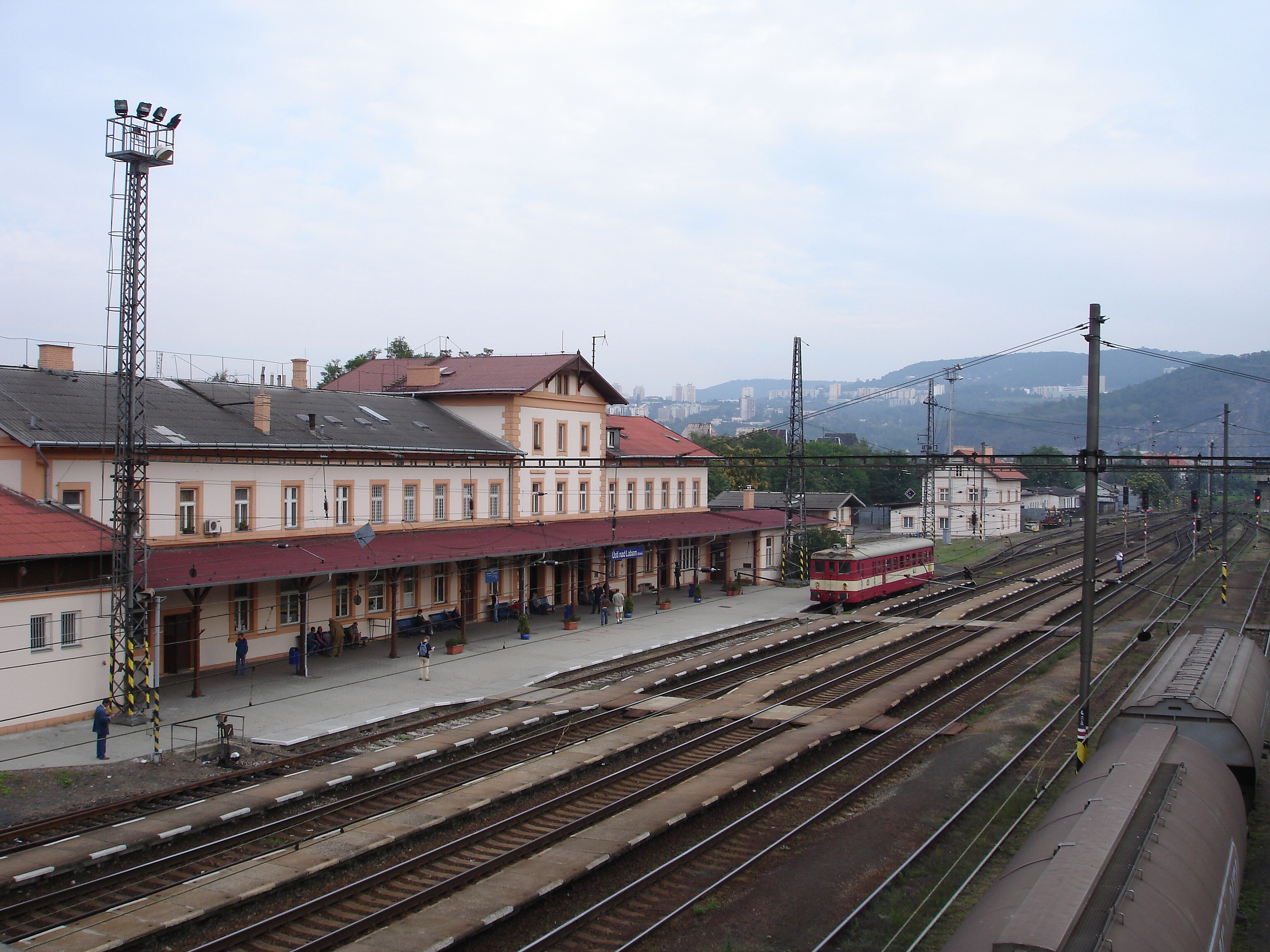
Station Ústí n.L.-Střekov

In chronological order
Date opened	ČD №	From	To			
6 December 1869	230	Golčův Jeníkov (Goltsch-Jenikau)	Čáslav (Tschaslau)	Kolín		
29 October 1870	032	Trutnov (Trautenau) main stn.	Trutnov Poříčí (Parschnitz)			
29 October 1870	071	Nymburk (Neuenburg) main stn.	Veleliby (Wellelib)	Mladá Boleslav (Jungbunzlau) main station		
29 October 1870	231	Kolín	Velký Osek (Groß Wossek)	Nymburk (Neuenburg) main station		
21 December 1870	230	Německý (Havlíčkův) Brod (Deutschbrod)	Světlá nad Sázavou (Swietla ob der Sasau)	Golčův Jeníkov (Goltsch-Jenikau)		
21 December 1870	020; 040	Velký Osek (Groß Wossek)	Chlumec nad Cidlinou (Chlumetz an der Zidlina)	Ostroměř (Wostromiersch)		
21 December 1870	040	Kunčice nad Labem (Pelsdorf)	Trutnov (Trautenau) main station			
25 January 1871	225	Jihlava (Iglau)	Německý (Havlíčkův) Brod (Deutschbrod)			
23 April 1871	241	Znojmo (Znaim)	Moravské Budějovice (Mährisch Budwitz)	Okříšky (Okrzischko)	Jihlava (Iglau)	
1 June 1871	238	Německý (Havlíčkův) Brod (Deutschbrod)	Žďárec u Skutče (Zdaretz)	Chrast	Chrudim (Crudim)	Pardubice (Pardubitz) Rosice nad Labem
1 June 1871	031	Pardubice (Pardubitz) main station				Pardubice (Pardubitz) Rosice nad Labem
1 June 1871	040	Ostroměř (Wostromiersch)	Stará Paka (Altpaka)	Kunčice nad Labem (Pelsdorf)		
1 October 1871	041	Kunčice nad Labem (Pelsdorf)	Vrchlabí (Hohenelbe)			
1 November 1871	248	Stockerau (Štokrava), Austria	Šatov (Schattau)	Znojmo (Znaim)		
17 December 1871	041	Ostroměř (Wostromiersch)	Jičín (Gitschin) cargo station			
17 December 1871	045	Trutnov (Trautenau) main station	Svoboda nad Úpou (Freiheit an der Aupa)			
4 October 1873	020	Chlumec nad Cidlinou (Chlumetz an der Zidlina)	Hradec Králové (Königgrätz)			
4 October 1873	231	Nymburk (Neuenburg)	Lysá nad Labem (Lissa an der Elbe)	Čelákovice (Czelakowitz)	Praha (Prag) Rohanský ostrov interim station	
1 January 1874	072	Lysá nad Labem (Lissa an der Elbe)	Všetaty (Wißen); Mělník	Litoměřice (Leitmeritz) lower station	Ústí nad Labem (Aussig) Střekov	Ústí nad Labem (Aussig) west station
10 January 1874	021	Hradec Králové (Königgrätz)	Týniště nad Orlicí (Tinischt)	Letohrad (Geiersberg)	Lichkov (Lichtenau)	
10 January 1874	024	Letohrad (Geiersberg)	Ústí nad Orlicí (Wildenschwert)			
5 October 1874	073	Ústí nad Labem (Aussig) Střekov	Velké Březno (Großpriesen)	Děčín (Tetschen) east station	Děčín Prostřední Žleb (Tetschen Mittelgrund)	
15 October 1875	N/A	Lichkov (Lichtenau)	Czech Republic/Poland border			
15 October 1875	N/A	Praha (Prag) Rohanský ostrov interim station	Praha (Prag); Těšnov station (Note: Passenger transport to Těšnov station ended 1 July 1972. The Neo-Renaissance station building designed by Carl Schlimp was demolished on 16 March 1985.)			
