= Kostelec (Jihlava District) =

- Municipality
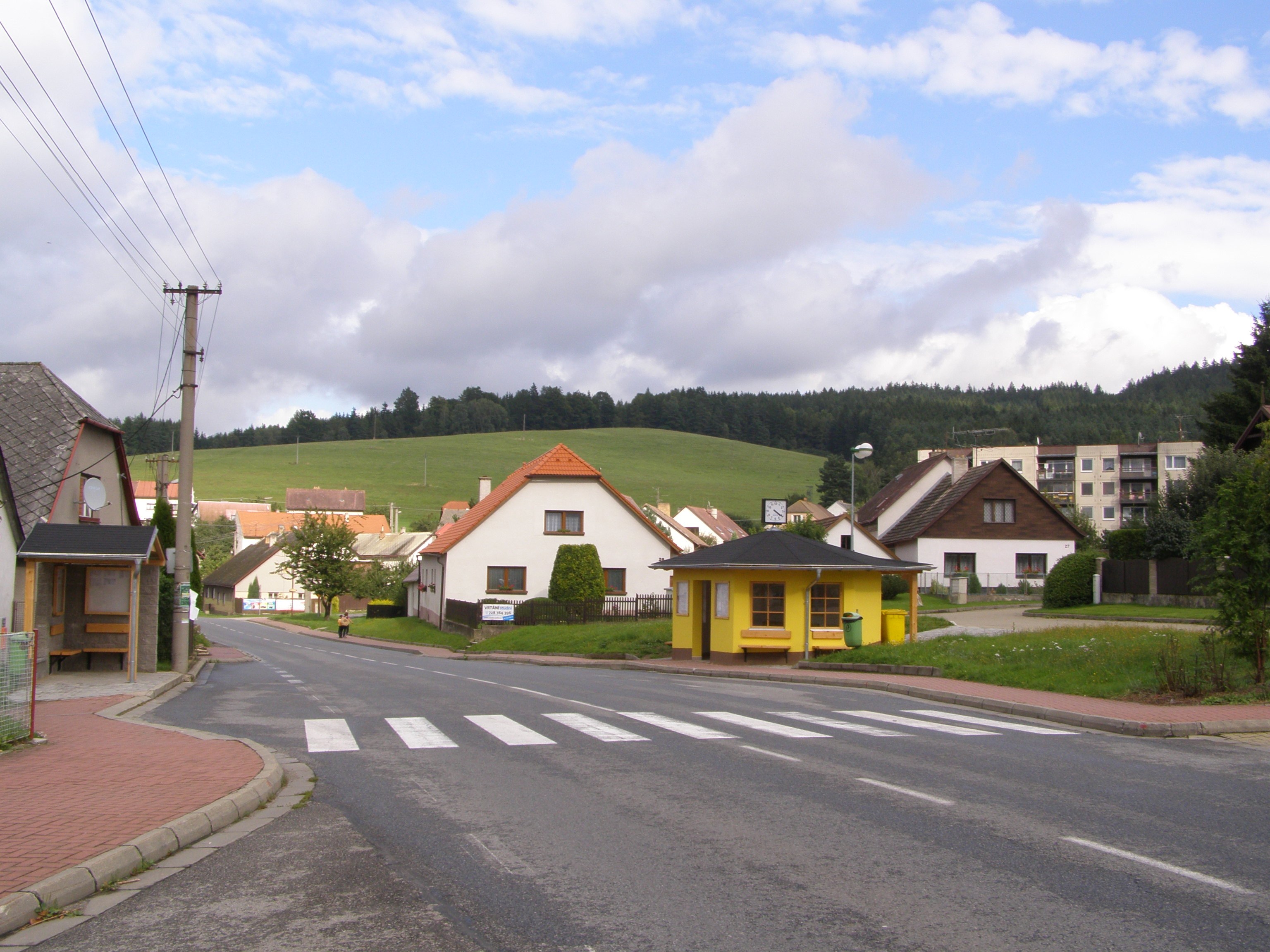
- Main street

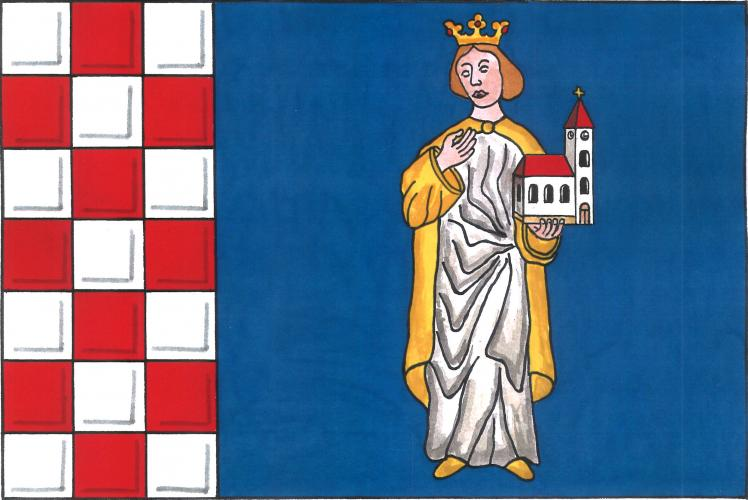
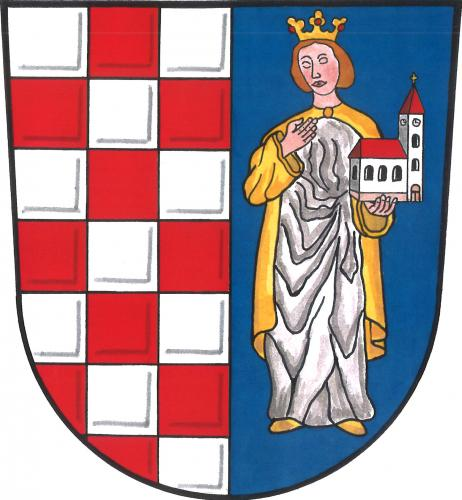
- Flag Coat of arms

- Location in the Czech Republic
- Coordinates: 49°21′41″N 15°29′27″E
- Country: Czech Republic
- Region: Vysočina
- District: Jihlava
- First mentioned: 1288

Area
  - Total: 8.90 km^{2} (3.44 sq mi)
- Elevation: 519 m (1,703 ft)

Population (2026-01-01)
  - Total: 983
  - Density: 110/km^{2} (286/sq mi)
- Time zone: UTC+1 (CET)
  - Summer (DST): UTC+2 (CEST)
- Postal code: 588 61
- Website: www.kostelec-u-jihlavy.cz

Kostelec (Czech pronunciation: [ˈkostɛlɛts]; German: Wolframs) is a municipality and village in Jihlava District in the Vysočina Region of the Czech Republic. It has about 1,000 inhabitants.

== Geography ==
Kostelec is located about 7 kilometres (4 mi) southwest of Jihlava. It lies in the Křižanov Highlands. The highest point is the hill Kostelecký vrch at 657 m (2,156 ft) above sea level. The municipality is situated on the right bank of the Jihlava River, at its confluence with the stream Třešťský potok. The Třešťský potok supplies two fishponds in the southern part of the municipality.

== History ==
The first written mention of Kostelec is from 1288.

== Demographics ==
Historical population

Year	Pop.	±%
1869	380	—
1880	411	+8.2%
1890	413	+0.5%
1900	412	−0.2%
1910	470	+14.1%

Year	Pop.	±%
1921	470	+0.0%
1930	502	+6.8%
1950	545	+8.6%
1961	481	−11.7%
1970	432	−10.2%

Year	Pop.	±%
1980	480	+11.1%
1991	693	+44.4%
2001	826	+19.2%
2011	891	+7.9%
2021	900	+1.0%

Source: Censuses

== Economy ==
Since 1917, the meat packing factory Kostelecké uzeniny has been operating in the municipality. It is the largest meat processor in the country. With more than 1,000 employees, it is one of the largest employers in the region.

== Transport ==
Kostelec is located on the railway lines Jihlava–Tábor and Havlíčkův Brod–Slavonice. The municipality is served by two stations: Kostelec u Jihlavy, which is situated just outside the municipal territory, and Kostelec u Jihlavy masna; the latter one is situated beside the meat packing factory.

== Sights ==
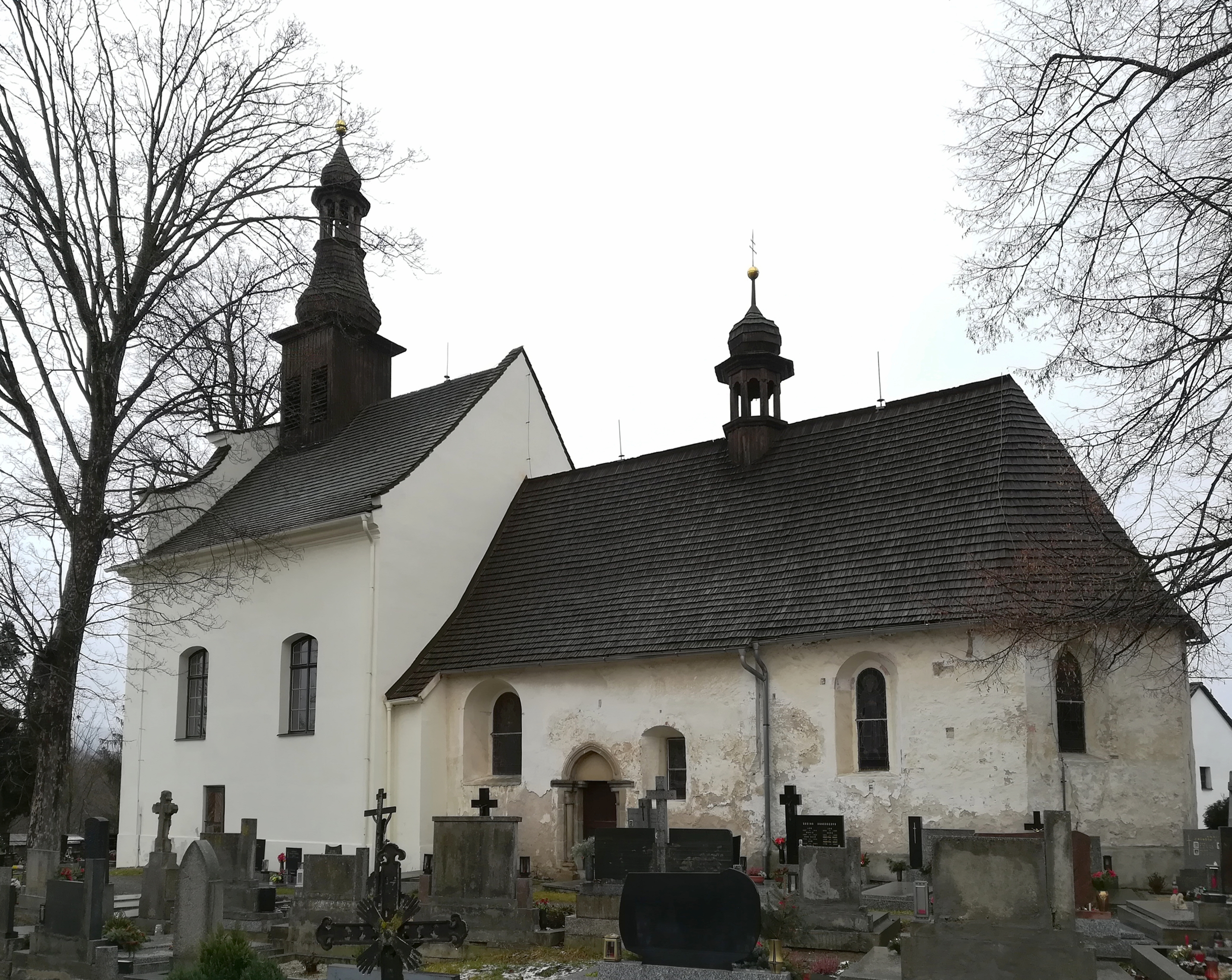
Church of Saint Cunigunde

The main landmark of Kostelec is the Church of Saint Cunigunde. It was built in 1250 on the site of an older wooden church. In the mid-15th century, it was extended. In the mid-17th century, it was rebuilt into its present form, but a Gothic side entrance portal from the original church has been preserved to this day.
