= Stoličná hora =

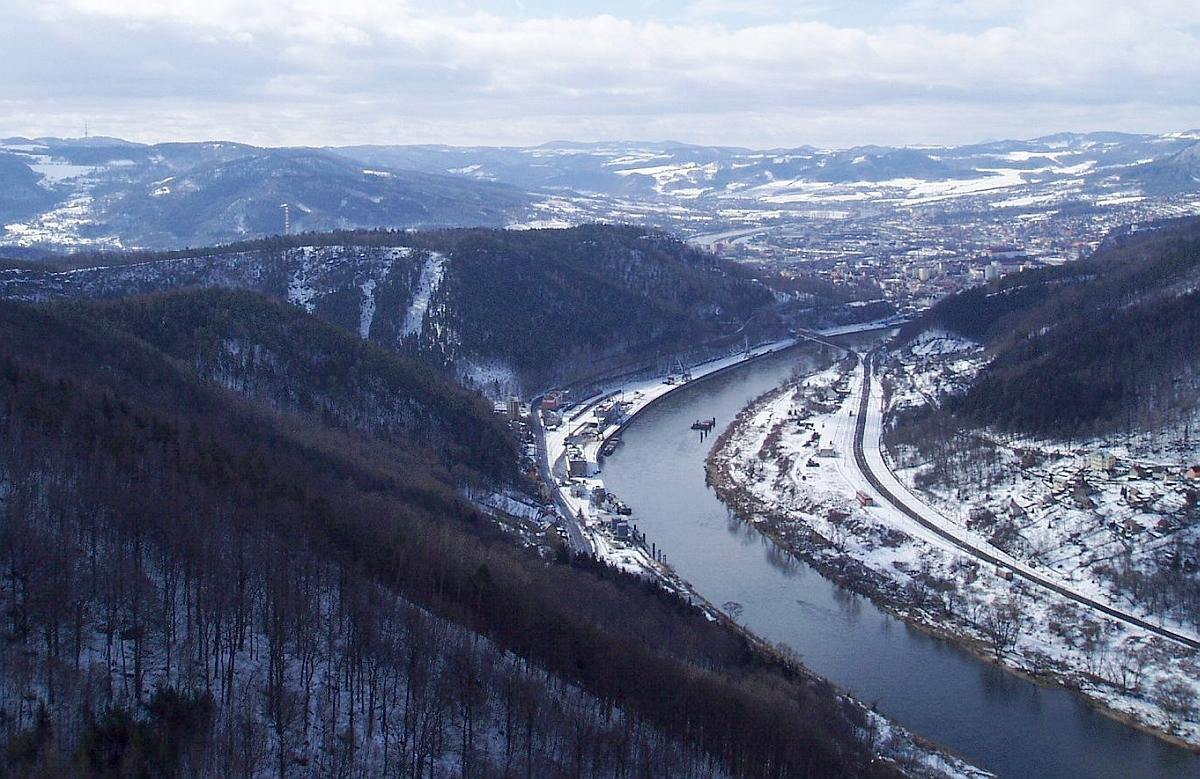
- View of the Quaderberg from the Rosenkamm

Highest point
- Elevation: 289.3 m n.m. (949 ft)
- Coordinates: 50°47′00″N 14°13′00″E

Geography
- Location within Czech Republic
- Location: Czech Republic
- Parent range: Elbe Sandstone Mountains

Geology
- Mountain type: Table mountain
- Rock type: Sandstone

The Stoličná hora (also Kvádrovec, Kvádrberk, German: Quaderberg) is a table hill near Děčín (Tetschen) in the Bohemian Switzerland in the Czech Republic.

== Location and area ==
The Stoličná hora rises immediately north of the town of Děčín. The west flank of the hill runs down to the River Elbe, which here at the Stoličná hora enters its deeply incised, narrow valley through the Elbe Sandstone Mountains. To the north, the hill is bounded by the Lauben Gorge in which the Loubsky potok, coming from the direction of Ludvíkovice (Loosdorf), flows down into the Elbe.

On the south side of the hill plateau is an observation point known as the Emperor's View (Kaiseraussicht or Císařský výhled). On the Elbe, below the steep, rocky hillside lies the small village of Loubí (Laube) which is part of Děčín and the extensive facilities of the Elbe port of Loubí. In the Quaderberg Tunnel the Děčín vychod–Děčín-Prostřední Žleb section of the railway line, once part of the former Austrian Northwestern Railway, cuts through the southwest flank of the hill.

== History ==
The first known treks up the Quaderberg are mentioned as early as 1828. When the hill was made more accessible in 1864 by Leopold Strnad, it was called the Leopold Heights (Leopoldshöhe). In 1870 the first restaurant opened here. The silver wedding of the Austrian emperor and empress in 1879 was the occasion of the erection of a sandstone column on the southern aspect of the hill which was named Emperor's View (Kaiseraussicht). In 1890 the pavilion known as Elbwarte ("Elbe Lookout") was built. A rest stop from 1900 was called the Karolinenfels. After 1945 the restaurant was torn down.

== Views ==
From the Emperor's View there is a picturesque view over the basin of Děčín as far as the heights of the nearby Central Bohemian Uplands. This is one of the highest viewing points in Bohemian Switzerland.

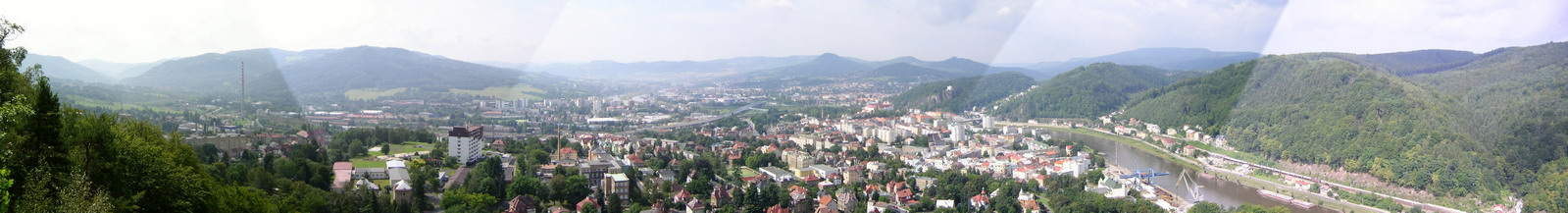
View from the Kaiseraussicht over Děčín

== Ascents ==
- The red signposted main hiking trail in Bohemian Switzerland runs over the Quaderberg; coming from Děčín and heading over the crest of Rosenkamm to Hřensko (Herrnskretschen).
