= Kunčice =

Kunčice may refer to places in the Czech Republic:

- Kunčice (Hradec Králové District), a municipality and village in the Hradec Králové Region
- Kunčice nad Labem, a municipality and village in the Hradec Králové Region
- Kunčice pod Ondřejníkem, a municipality and village in the Moravian-Silesian Region
- Kunčice (Ostrava), an administrative part of Ostrava in the Moravian-Silesian Region
- Kunčice, a village and part of Bělotín in the Olomouc Region
- Kunčice, a village and part of Letohrad in the Pardubice Region
- Kunčice, a village and part of Staré Město (Šumperk District) in the Olomouc Region
