= 2016 Brno central station referendum =

Brno central station referendum, 2016
- 7 October 2016

Upgrade the existing station
Yes	80.94%
No	13.12%
Blank votes	3.88%
Invalid	2.06%

Modernization through architectural competition
Yes	67.89%
No	15.96%
Blank votes	13.64%
Invalid	2.51%

First question

Second question

The 2016 Brno central station referendum was a municipal referendum on the location of Brno main railway station, in Brno, Moravia, Czech Republic and the way of its future modernisation. Citizens voted on whether to retain the station at its current location and modernise it, or replace it with a new station at another location. The result of the referendum bound only local government. Nevertheless, it also indirectly affects government organs in the Czech Republic through the already existing system of contractual obligations. The referendum was held on 7 and 8 October 2016, the same day as regional elections.

== Background ==
Brno Main Railway Station, located directly in the Brno city centre (on the former fortification wall circuit) has been in service since 1838. As time went by, the symmetric and harmonized tram network adjacent to the railway station was developed. The tram network grew along with the city for 157 years. Today, the main railway station borders closely with tram nodes with seven tram lines. Each of them is in half of its route, so there are 14 routes of the tram network. (they are distributed to the structure of city with 8 tracks). Then there are 2 lines of trolleybuses and 8 lines of buses. There is also a terminal of long-distance buses in the distance of 150 metres (490 ft) from the railway station. The majority of the most important city destinations are within comfortable walking distance. About 11,000 inhabitants live within 1,300 metres (4,300 ft). In the last 20 years, projects have been moving the railway station 1 kilometer (0.62 mi) out of the city centre.

== History ==
Ninety years ago, the idea of changing the main railway station's location appeared as a reaction of the annual increase of traffic (1923–1924 = + 26%). Since then this idea has weakening alternately, disappeared or reappeared in different circumstances. However, it repeatedly ran into a strong and resolute opposition of experts and the public.

The first local referendum on this question was held in 2004. Local authorities set the date of referendum on 9 October, which means one week before the European parliament elections.

The idea of repeating the referendum on the same topic appeared in the beginning of 2013 after the first successful local referendum in Plzeň, the same day as Presidential elections. It was motivated by the change of legislation of the code of local referendum, which was in the quorum – 35% instead of the previous 50% turnout is now necessary to make a referendum binding for a local authority.

== Legislation ==
No legislation on a national referendum has been passed so far. There are just two types of local referendum in the Czech law – municipal referendum and regional referendum. Each type is regulated with a different code. In the case of Brno, the Local Referendum Code is relevant.

== Judgements ==
On 1 August 2014 the Referendum initiative committee submitted the "Proposal on the holding of a referendum on the Main railway station location" to Brno municipal authority and with 1,531 referendum petition forms containing 21,101 signatures of eligible voters. Fifteen days later, the authority claimed that 5,251 signatures were incorrect (i.e. invalid). The initiative committee considered this statement dubious, arbitrary and obstructive from the side of the public authority. (Standard error rate during signature gathering is around 3%). Therefore, they brought up an action against the authority to the administrative court. After two weeks they submitted another 5,813 signatures. Eventually on 17 October 2014, after two individual judgements, a court passed the judgement 65A 8/2014 - 74 There, the court recognized, on the basis of its own proving, that the number of signatures was already sufficient by 1 September 2014. Thus the referendum should have been declared simultaneously with the municipal elections in October 2014.

== Final decision ==
After this judgement the proponents proposed that the referendum should be held simultaneously with the next regional elections in October 2016. (PB is authorised to it). The newly elected city representation accepted this proposal on its first gathering on 25 November 2014. The referendum which was originally intended for municipal elections 2014 was postponed to 2016, because the referendum which is held simultaneously with elections has a much bigger chance of achieving sufficient turnout.

== See also ==
- Stuttgart 21
