= Tatra K3R-N =

Czech three-unit tram

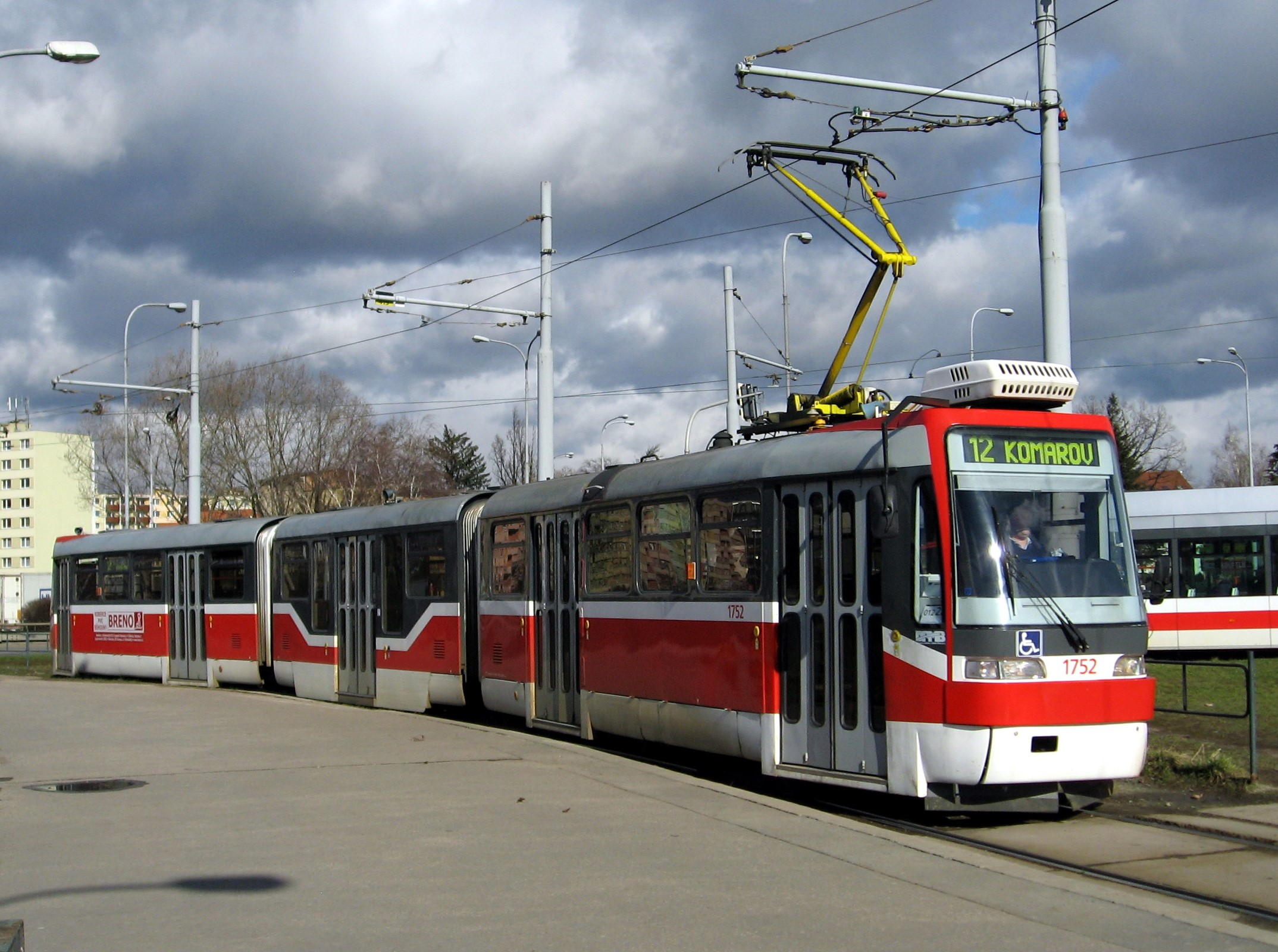
- Manufacturers: (Czech Republic) ČKD Dopravní systémy (Czech Republic) Pars Nova (Ukraine) KZET
- Constructed: 2004–2006
- Entered service: 2002
- Refurbished: 2002–2004
- Number built: 4
- Capacity: 54

Specifications
- Train length: 28,250 mm
- Width: 2,500 mm
- Height: 3,075 mm
- Articulated sections: 3
- Maximum speed: 65 km/h
- Power output: 8×40 kW
- Track gauge: 1,435 mm (4 ft 8 1/2 in)

The Tatra K3R-N is a Czech three-unit semi-low-floor tram. It was created as a modernization of the Tatra K2 tram by Pars Nova for the Brno City Transport Company. Two trams were modernized in this way between 2002 and 2004, and two more trams were produced from scratch in 2006.

== History ==
The trend of introducing low-floor trams and obsolescence of existing two-unit Tatra K2 trams forced the Brno City Transport Company to carry out renovations of the K2. The company Pars Nova submitted an offer to the Brno City Transport Company for refurbishment of existing trams along with the addition of a third unit. The refurbishment resulted in the creation of a new high-capacity vehicle, approaching the capacity of the Tatra KT8D5 tram.

=== Modernization ===
Original Tatra K2 trams underwent an overhaul of their original units and chassis. A third, low-floor unit with a sliding platform and places for prams and wheelchairs was added to the original sections. On the left side of the middle unit (opposite the door), there is a wide emergency exit door that can be used by wheelchair users. The cars received new laminate headboards designed by Patrik Kotas, which are used in Brno in greater quantity. The interior has also been modernized with new folding doors, windows, padded seats, handrails, panelling, anti-slip flooring, acoustic and an optical passenger information system. The driver's cabin has also been modernized with a manual gear shifter, new control console, air conditioning, and a new seat.

The second modernized tram differs from the first in details in use of lighter and stronger couplers, and enlarged engine cooling ducts, but the biggest change is the absence of an emergency exit in the middle unit.

The later two K3R-N trams are the same as the second tram with exception of a different semi-pantograph and a different articulation, but they have been built completely new with use of original Tatra K2 documents and blueprints.

== Operators ==
Country	City	Operator	Units
Czech Republic	Brno	Dopravní podnik města Brna	4
Czech Republic	Plzeň	Plzeňské městské dopravní podniky	4
Ukraine	Kyiv	Kyivpastrans	14(one burned down in 2016)
Ukraine	Kryvyi Rih	Shvydkisnyi tramvai	2
Russia	Moscow	Mosgortrans	1
