= Trams in Brno =

Tram system of the city of Brno, Czechia

Brno tramway network Brněnská tramvajová síť
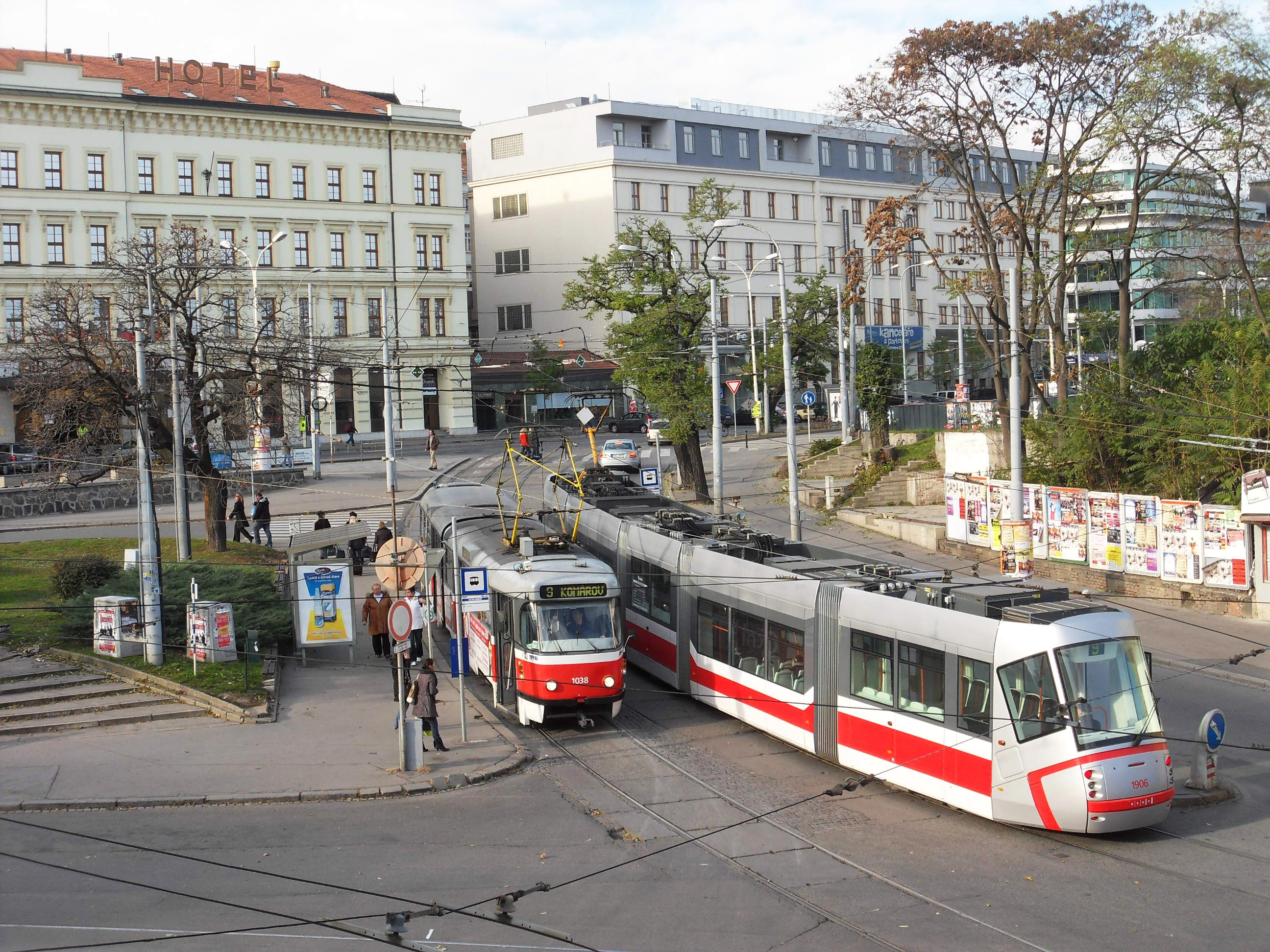
- Tatra K2 and Škoda 13T near the main train station

Operation
- Locale: Brno, Czech Republic
- Open: 1869 (horse tram); 1884 (steam tram); 1900 (electric tram)
- Status: Operational
- Routes: 12
- Operator: Dopravní podnik města Brna

Infrastructure
- Track gauge: 1,435 mm (4 ft 8 1/2 in)
- Electrification: 600 V DC
- Stock: 281 tram vehicles

Statistics
- Track length (single): 139 km (86 mi)
- Route length: 70.4 km (43.7 mi)
- 2012: 196.513 million (2013)
Overview
Map of the network in 2023
- Website: http://www.dpmb.cz DPMB — How to travel

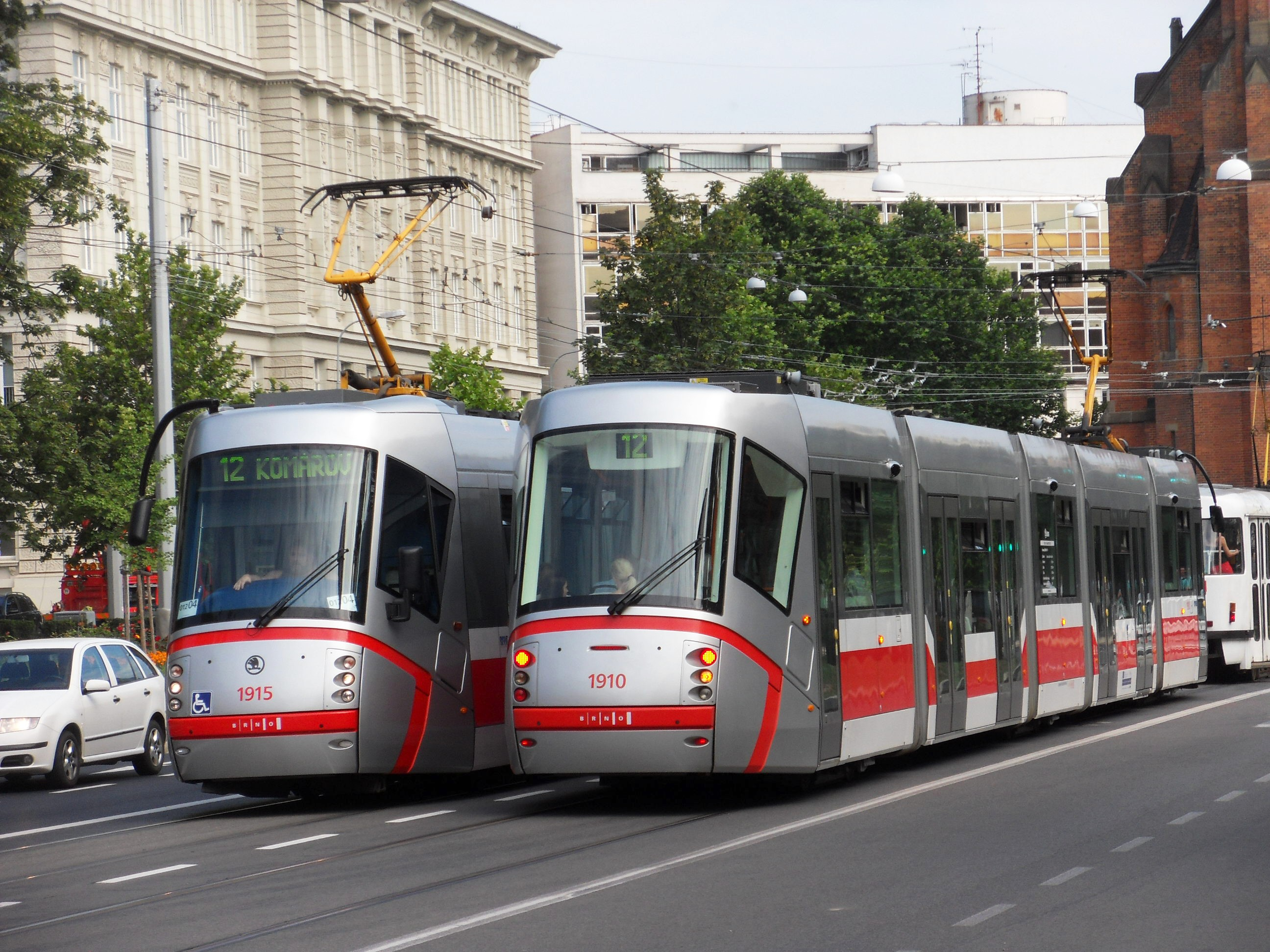
Trams in Brno, one of the oldest permanently used networks in the world

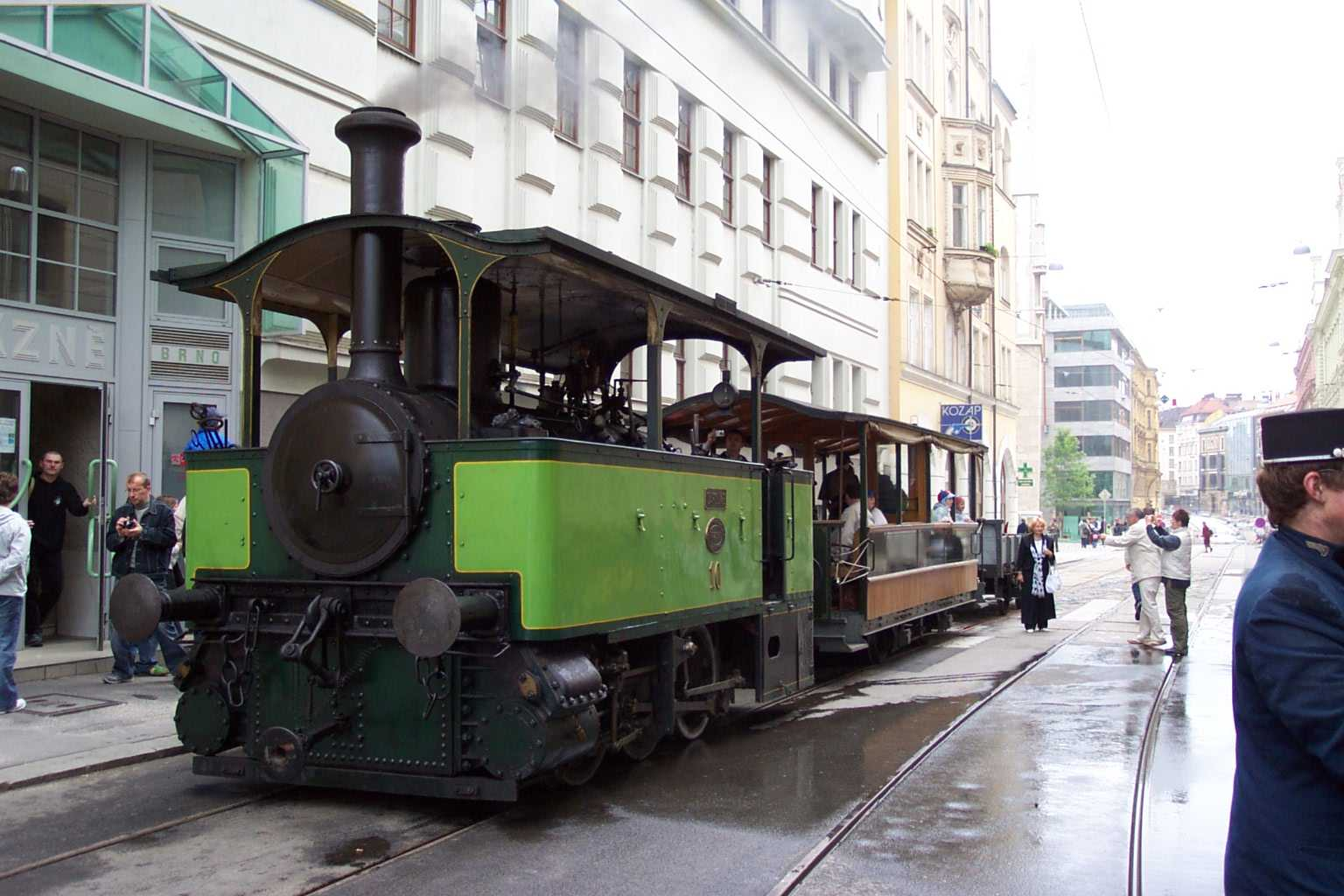
Trams in Brno, Historical steam tramway - annual tram June parade in Brno

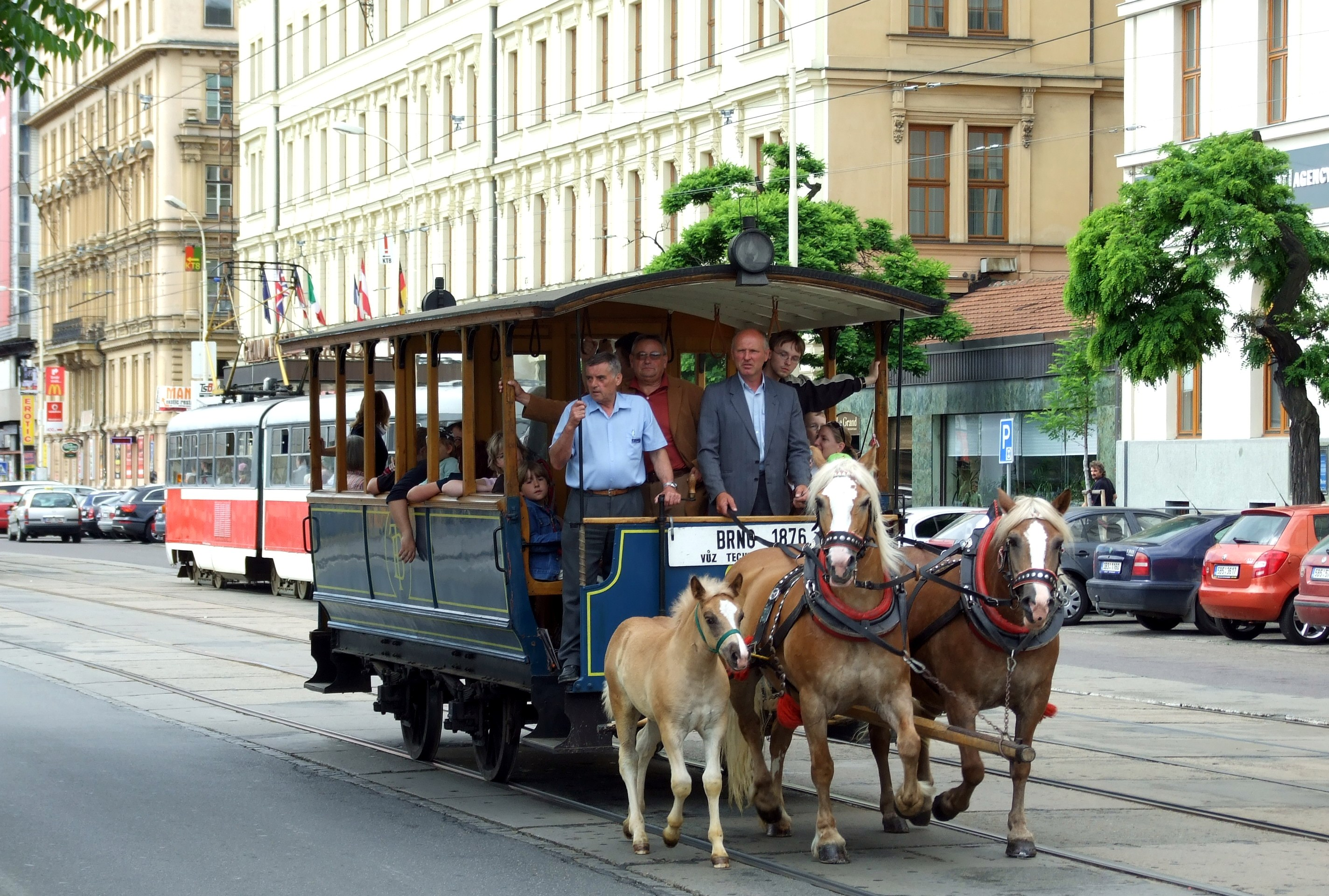
Trams in Brno, Historical horse tramway - annual tram June parade in Brno

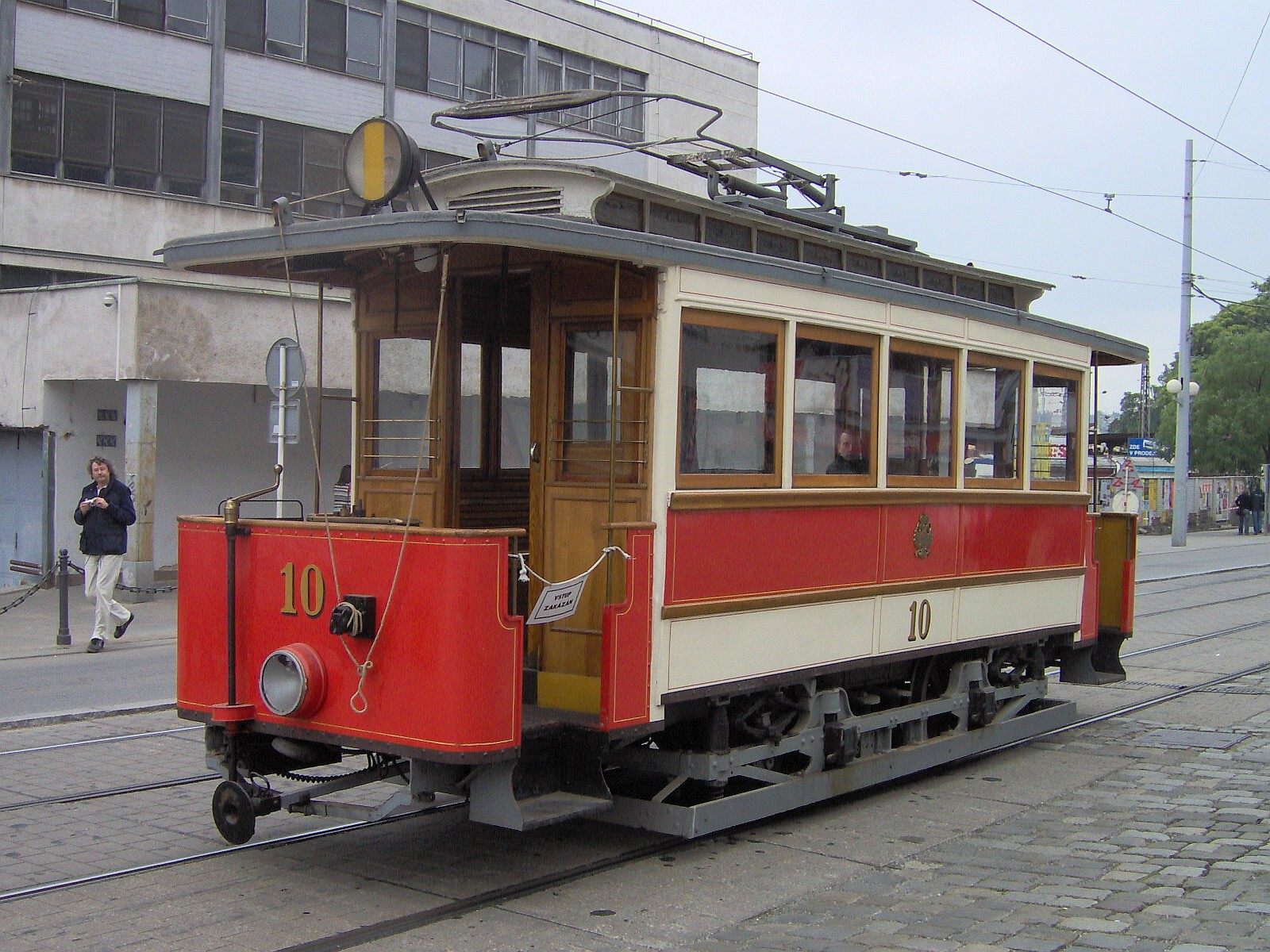
Trams in Brno, Historical electric tramway - the first type of electric tram in Brno

The Brno tramway network (Czech: Tramvajová doprava v Brně, simply Tramvaje v Brně) was the first network of its kind to be put into operation in what is now known as the Czech Republic with its horse tram lines dating back to 1869. Today, Brno is the second largest city in the Czech Republic, after Prague, and its tram network is also the second largest in the country.

Currently, the Brno tram system comprises 12 lines, with a total operational track length of 139 kilometres (86 mi) and a total route length of 70.4 kilometres (43.7 mi). The lines not only service the urban area, but also lead to the neighboring town of Modřice located south of Brno. Before construction began on the final leg of the extension in 2008, the entire network was made up of 69.7 km of track.

In the Brno dialect of the Czech language (hantec), the word for tram is ‘šalina’. The origins of this word can be traced to the German expression ‘Elektrische Linie’ (electric lines) or 'schallen' (to sound).

== History ==
=== Horse-drawn trams ===
Brno was the third largest city of the Austrian part of the former Austro-Hungarian Empire and is today part of the Czech Republic. It was the first to install a horse-drawn tram service, which began on 17 August 1869. Its route ran to Lažanskýplatz (now called Moravské náměstí, or Moravian Square) in the north of the city center, which was still at the time an independent municipality known as Královo Pole. Its operator was the 'Brno Tramway Society' for passenger and cargo transportation. By 1870, there were 52 cars, which carried passengers on four lines.

There was an interruption in horse-drawn tram service between 1875 and 1877. The company known today as Brno Tramway was launched in June 1876, with its first route running from the main station to Pisárky. A short while after that, a second route was launched. Due to its unprofitability, horse-drawn tram operation was terminated on 3 October 1880.

=== The steam tram ===
Steam trams began operation on 24 May 1884, under the name Steam Tramway Brno. In the 1910s, the conversion from steam to electrical power began, but steam locomotives were still used, until 1914, to transport goods.

=== The beginning of the electric tram ===
The first of the electric rail lines in Brno were put into operation on 21 June 1900. These new lines included 41 railcars and 12 trailers, as well as another 29 trailers gradually modified from the horse and steam tramway periods.

Within the first year of operation several new lines were constructed, and soon a total of five lines were offered as part of the system. In the years that followed, the main focus was on track reconstruction and the addition of a second track; in 1910, the first tram loop in Brno was opened at the Pisárky terminus.

In 1914, the operator began to experience financial difficulties and was taken over by the Austrian electricity delivery group Aktiengesellschaft from Vienna. During World War I further expansion was considered, resulting in the extension of one line to a hospital.

=== Prime of the Brno tram ===
After the formation of Czechoslovakia in 1918, the Society of Brno Trams (Společnost brněnských elektrických pouličních drah) was established. The Society's first task was to renovate the cars and tracks that had dilapidated during the war. Beginning in 1924 new lines were built, and a few years later the Society of Brno Trams began to focus on the construction of a second track for far-lane routes.

By 1938, a total of eight routes were in operation. In 1942, a classic train was transferred and transformed into a train capable of traveling by a streetcar track. Since the 1960s the network has been gradually been upgraded to light rail standards. New sections were built with dedicated right-of-way and designed for maximum speeds of 80 km/h, however such speeds were never put in practice.

=== Future ===
For a long time, Brno metro and underground railway have both been considered, to create a second metro in the Czech Republic after the Prague Metro. As of 2025, no plans have been confirmed. In 2020s, a short line to Masaryk University campus and a university hospital was opened. Another extension from Bystrc to Kamechy is under construction. Both these extensions include tunnels.

== Routes ==
Regular daily lines in 2024
Tram	Line
1	Řečkovice ↔ Bystrc, Ečerova
2	Židenice, Stará Osada ↔ Modřice, smyčka
3	Židenice, Stará Osada ↔ Bystrc Rakovecká
4	Masarykova čtvrť, Náměstí Míru ↔ Obřany Babická
5	Štefánikova čtvrť ↔ Ústřední hřbitov, smyčka
6	Královo Pole, nádraží ↔ Starý Lískovec, smyčka
7	Lesná, Čertova rokle ↔ Starý Lískovec, smyčka
8	Líšeň, Mifkova ↔ Nemocnice Bohunice
9	Lesná, Čertova rokle ↔ Juliánov
10	Stránská skála, smyčka ↔ Bystrc, Rakovecká
12	Technologický park ↔ Komárov

== Rolling stock ==
Brno tramway network's fleet consists of:

Image	Tram car type	Modifications and subtypes	In service
	Tatra T3	Tatra T3G, T3R, T3P, T3R.EV, T3R.PV	36
	Tatra KT8D5	Tatra KT8D5R.N2, KT8D5N	26
	Tatra T6A5	Tatra T6A5	32
	Škoda 03 T	Škoda 03T	6
	Tatra K3R-N	Tatra K3R-N	4
	TW Team VarioLF	VarioLFR.E	32
	Škoda 13 T	Škoda 13T	49
	TW Team VarioLF2	VarioLF2R.E	32
	TW Team EVO2	EVO2	41
	Škoda ForCity Smart	Škoda 45T	40

== See also ==
- History of Brno
- Transport in Brno
- List of town tramway systems in the Czech Republic
