= Jihlava railway station =

Railway station in Jihlava, Czech Republic

Jihlava
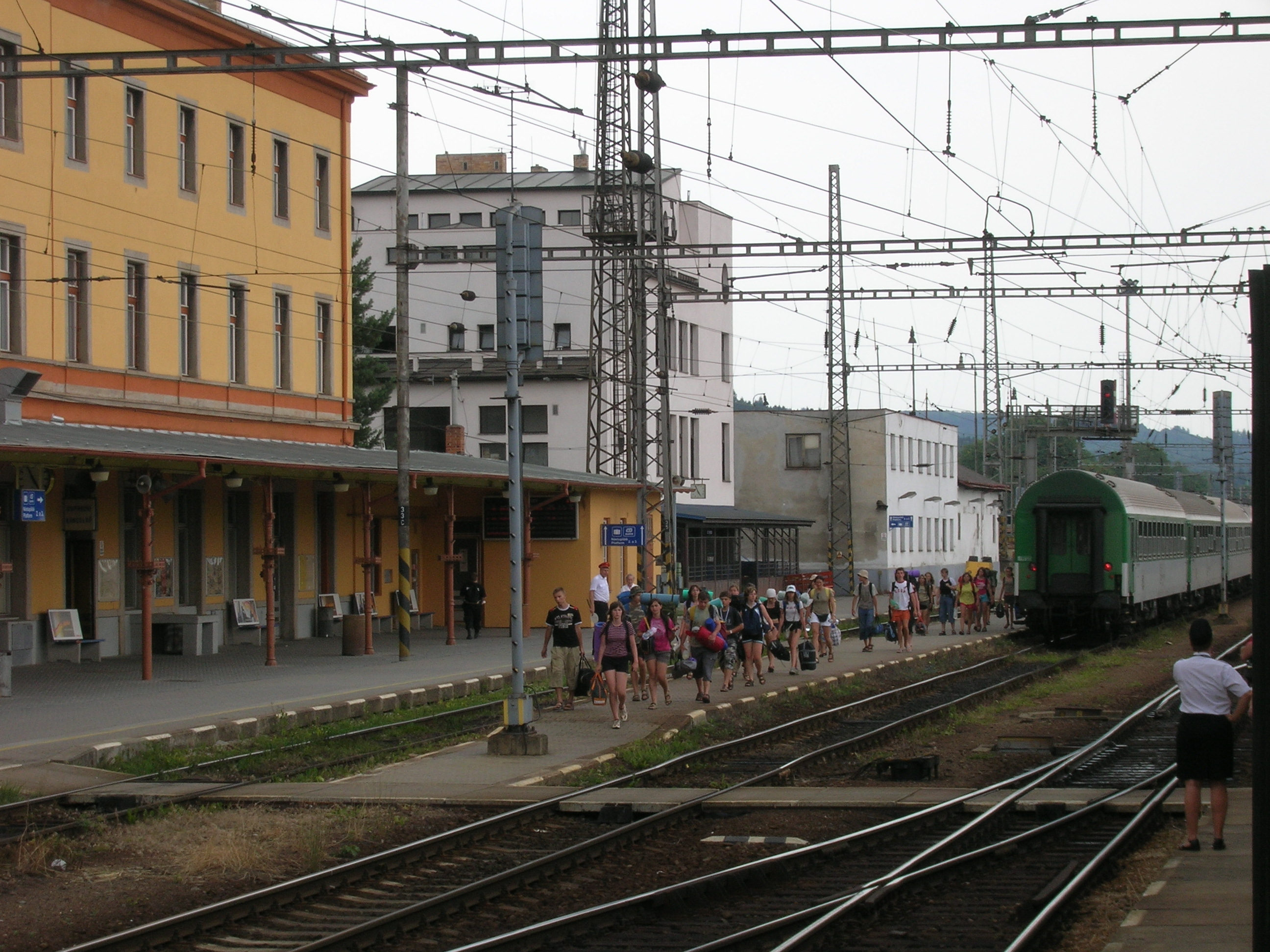
- Jihlava railway station

General information
- Location: Havlíčkova 122; 586 01 Jihlava; Czech Republic
- Coordinates: 49°24′52″N 15°35′56″E
- Owner: Czech Republic
- Lines: Havlíčkův Brod–Veselí nad Lužnicí (225); Brno–Jihlava (240)
- Platforms: 3(5)
- Tracks: 13
- Connections: Trolleybuses and buses

Construction
- Architect: Carl Schlimp

Other information
- Station code: 54342154

History
- Opened: 25 January 1871; 155 years ago
- Rebuilt: 1890–1900
- Electrified: 60s
Location
- Location within Czech Republic

Jihlava railway station (Czech: železniční stanice Jihlava) is a railway station in the city of Jihlava, the capital of the Vysočina Region, Czech Republic.

== History ==
The station was the first railway station to be built in Jihlava as part of the rail link between Vienna via Znojmo, Německý Brod, Kutná Hora and Kolín. The investor and operator was the Austrian Northwestern Railway (Österreichische Nordwestbahn, ÖNWB), the project was taken over by the main architect of this company, Viennese engineer Carl Schlimp. The first test train arrived at the railway station in Jihlava on 21 December 1870, construction works were finished that year in April. In 1871, all current tracks were in operation.

After completion, the building was one of the largest on the ÖNWB lines. The reception building had a system of numerous basements (23 cellars in total). On the ground floor there was a spacious entrance hall with two cashboxes and a wooden newspaper stand. In the left part of the building there were transport and telegraph office and a post office. In the right-hand ground floor of the building were waiting rooms I, II. and III. class. There were also water cranes that took water directly from the Jihlava river or a depot for the locomotives and wagons owned by the Austrian Northwest Railroad. In the adjoining buildings of the waterworks there was an office of a track officer, a smith, a trackside workers' shelter and an oil store.

Jihlava railway station was erected on a slope north of the city centre from the ÖNWB's decision, this distant location was then widely criticized by residents and representatives of the town hall. The north-east trail runs from Havlíčkův Brod to Třebíč, from the west is connected the track from Horní Cerekev. Even before the start of the construction itself, the variant of the construction of the station under Královský vršek hill on the line to Horní Cerekev and Veselí nad Lužnicí was taken into consideration. In October 1887, the second railway station, later named Jihlava-město (Jihlava-City), was opened here.

In the years 1890–1900, the railway station underwent a major reconstruction and modernization in order to serve the growing volumes of rail transport, freight especially. During the subsequent modifications extending until 1912, a loading ramp, a waterworks, a laundry room, an ice cellar, a reception building, a barracks, a shed with a load, a ramp, a kerosene depot, a coal slide, a coal cellar, a transfer hall, a workshop, a carriage house for 20 locomotives, coal sheds, wood warehouse, stock material, station warehouse, farm sheds, wooden loading ramps, clerical and service residential buildings.

Since 1908, the electric "malodráha" (tram line) has been running from the center to the station after a wooden bridge over the Jihlava river has replaced a solid Art Nouveau concrete structure. The timetable was coordinated with departures and arrivals of trains. On this occasion, electricity was installed in the building of the station, this tram line was later replaced by trolleybuses. As part of the nationalization of private railway companies in the Austro-Hungarian Empire, both railway stations in the city underwent a single administration in 1913.

In 1892 the Chancellor of the German Empire Otto von Bismarck arrived at Iglau Nordwestbahnhof during his visit in the city.

== Name ==
In 1871 station was named Iglau (Jihlava), in 1888 the name was changed to Iglau Nordwestbahnhof, and later in 1921 to Jihlava.

== Services ==
Preceding station	České dráhy	Following station
terminus	Stopping trains	Jihlava-Bosch Diesel toward Havlíčkův Brod
terminus	Stopping trains	Malý Beranov toward Třebíč
Jihlava-Staré Hory or terminus	Stopping trains	Jihlava-Bosch Diesel toward Havlíčkův Brod
Jihlava-Bosch Diesel	Stopping trains	Jihlava-Staré Hory or terminus toward Pelhřimov or terminus
Jihlava-Bosch Diesel or terminus	Stopping trains	Jihlava-Staré Hory toward Telč
Jihlava-Bosch Diesel or terminus	Stopping trains	Jihlava-Staré Hory toward Tábor
Jihlava-Staré Hory	Stopping trains	Jihlava-Bosch-Diesel or terminus toward Dobronín or terminus
terminus	Stopping trains	Luka nad Jihlavou or Malý Beranov toward Zastávka u Brna
Luka nad Jihlavou or Malý Beranov	Stopping trains	terminus
Malý Beranov	Stopping trains	Jihlava-Staré Hory toward Dačice město
Jihlava-Staré Hory	Stopping trains	Havlíčkův Brod or terminus toward Havlíčkův Brod or terminus
Jihlava-Staré Hory	Regional fast trains	Havlíčkův Brod toward Havlíčkův Brod
Havlíčkův Brod	Regional fast trains	Jihlava-Staré Hory toward Telč, Dačice, Dačice město, or Slavonice
Dolní Cerekev	Fast trains	Okříšky toward Brno hl. n.
Okříšky	Fast trains	Dolní Cerekev or terminus toward Plzeň hl. n., České Budějovice, or terminus

Since December 2026, direct trains Praha hl. n. - Jihlava are planned:

Preceding station	České dráhy	Following station
Havlíčkův Brod	Fast trains	Jihlava město terminus
Jihlava město	Fast trains	Havlíčkův Brod toward Praha hl. n.

== Literature ==
- Alois ŠIMKA, Sto let Severozápadní dráhy, OA Jihlava 1971, p. 13. (Czech)
- SOkA Jihlava, Archiv města Jihlavy po r. 1849, stavební archiv, odd. železnice (Czech)
- SOkA Jihlava, Městská správa Jihlava/Hospodářská registratura VII-li, k. 500, sign. 730. (Czech)
- Mojmír KREJČIŘÍK, Po stopách našich železnic, Praha 1991, p. 150. (Czech)
