= Aliance TW Team =

Czech transport engineering alliance

TW Team
- Industry: Rail transport
- Headquarters: Czech Republic
- Area served: Europe
- Products: low-floor trams
- Website: www.twteam.cz

Aliance TW Team (often called TW Team) is a Czech engineering alliance that manufactures electric trams. It consists of Pragoimex (Pragoimex a.s.), KOS (Krnovské opravny a strojírny s.r.o.) en VKV (VKV Praha s.r.o.).

== History ==
The alliance started with renovations of trams in 2001, often also adding low-floor sections to existing Tatra models.

== Products ==
TW Team modernised Tatra T3 trams operated for several Czech cities. In 2012, the alliance produced its first own tram, the EVO2, which was gradually delivered to Czech tram operators starting in 2019. This was followed by the EVO1 in 2015 which has four axles, while the EVO2 has six axles.

TW Team trams

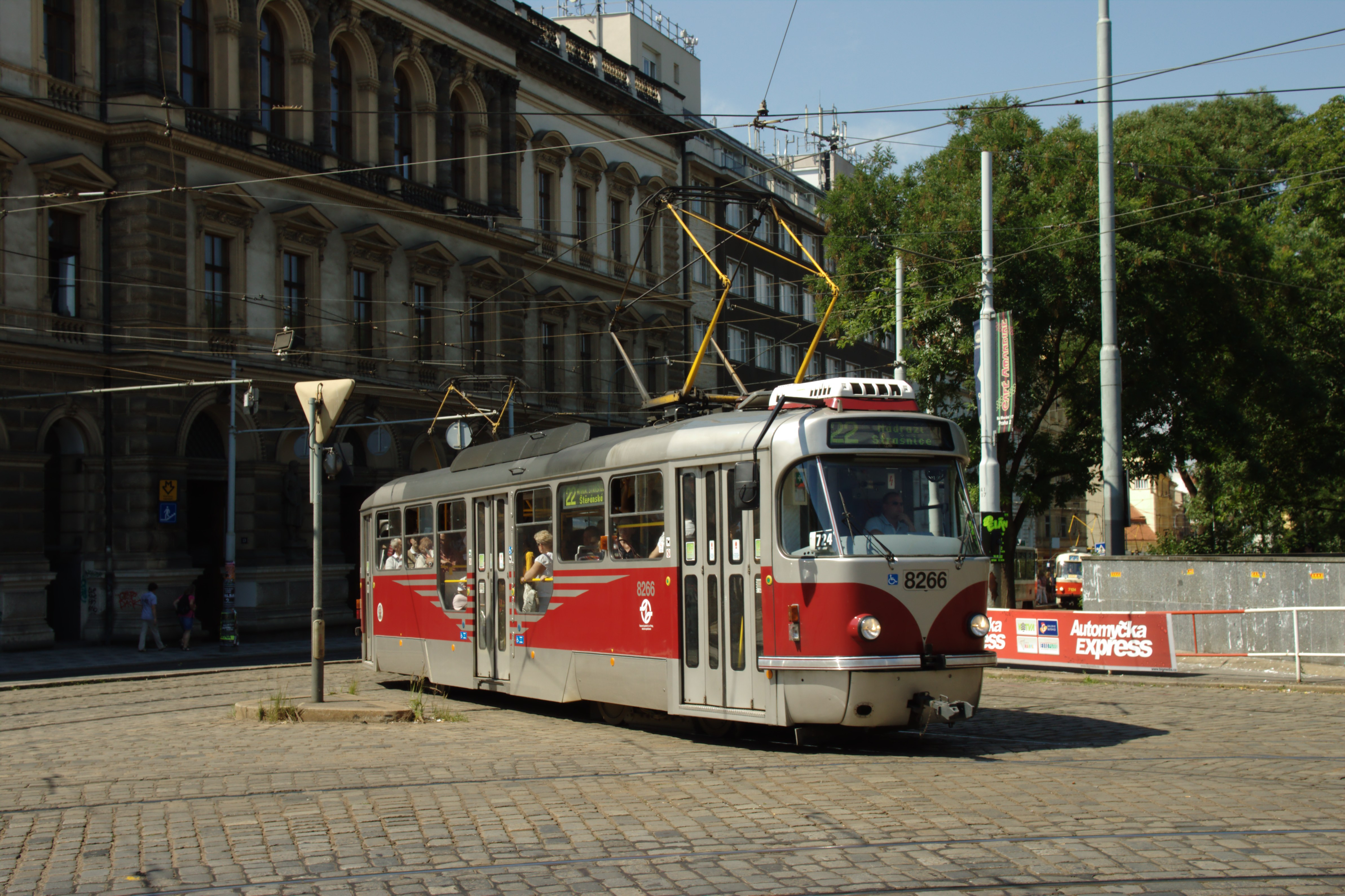
Modernised Tatra T3

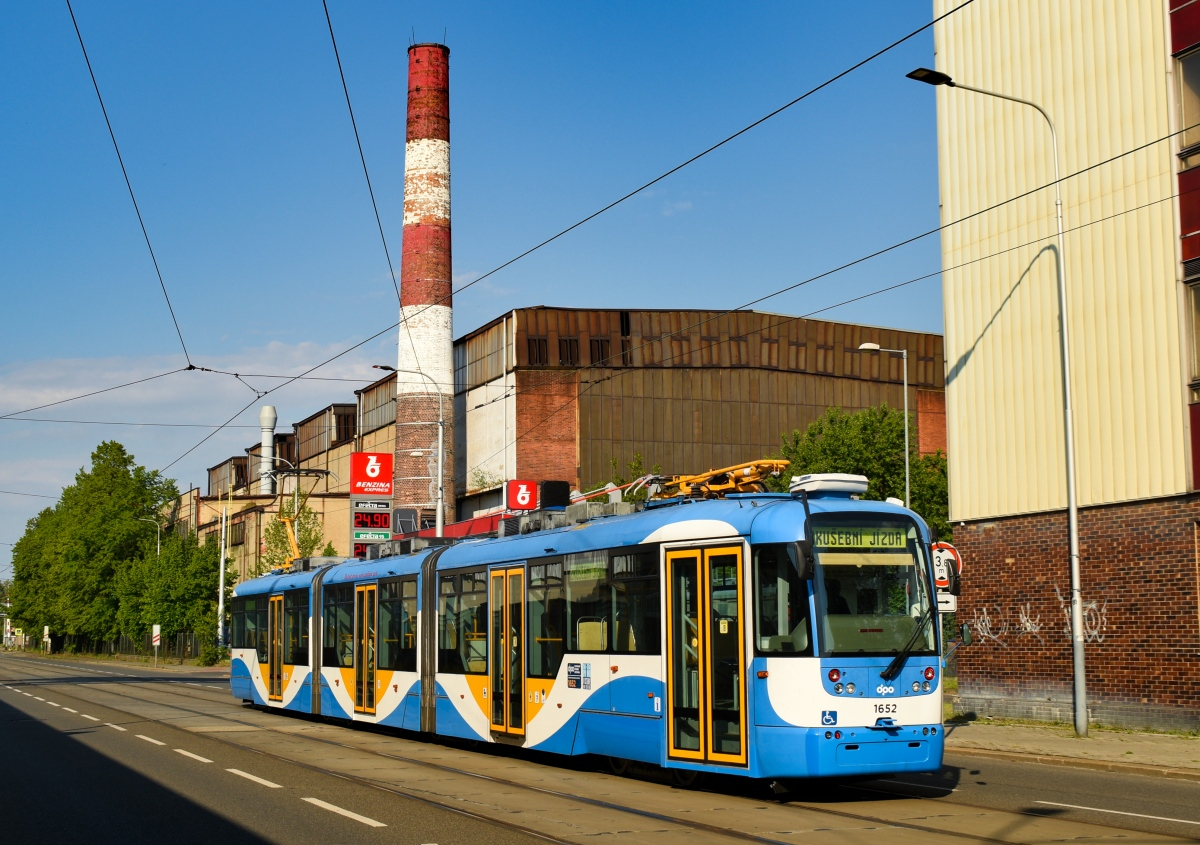
Vario LF3

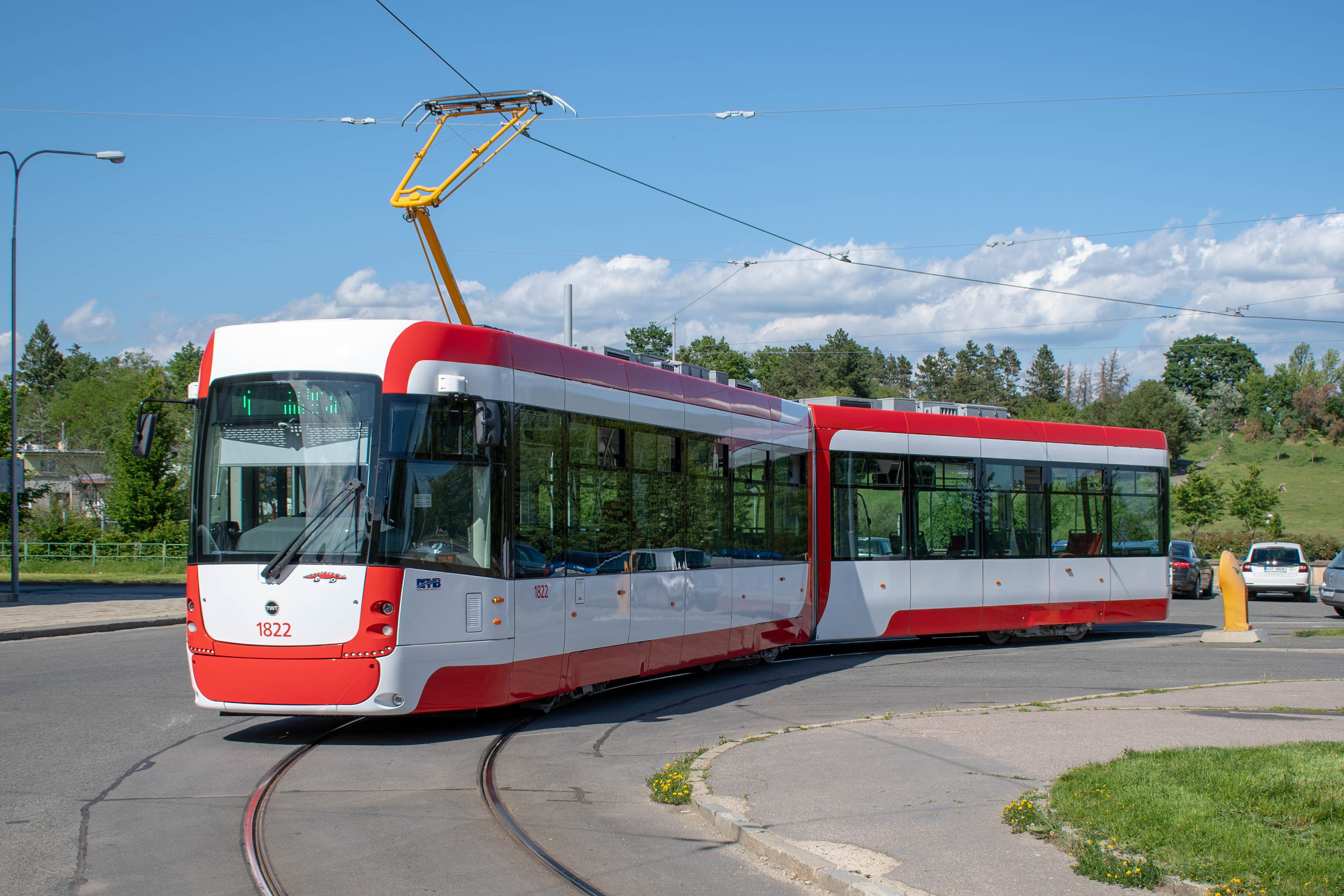
EVO2 in Brno
