= Velký Osek =

- Municipality
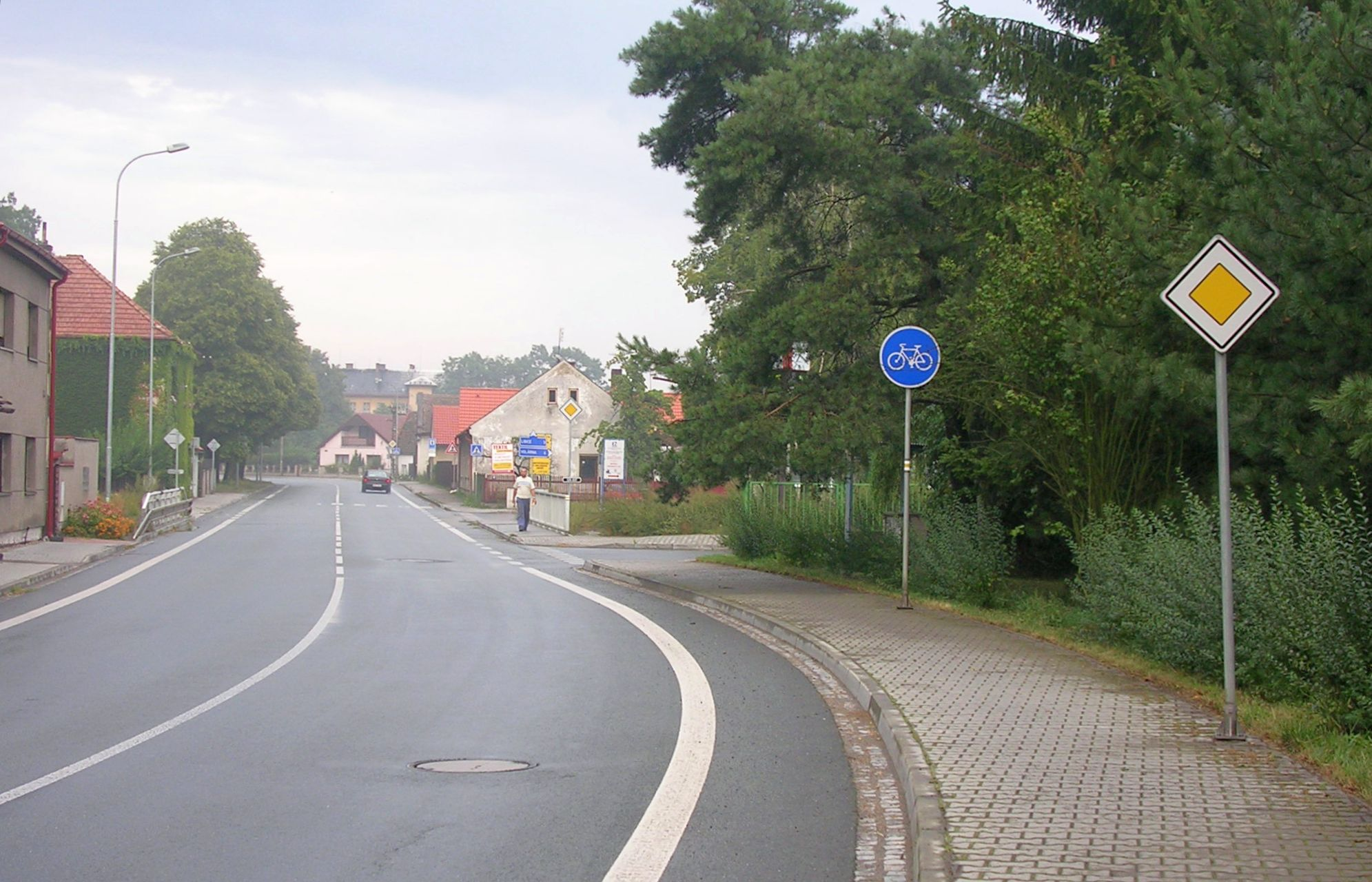
- Main street

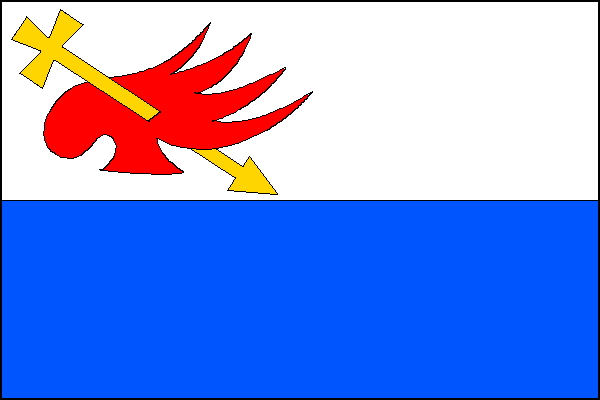
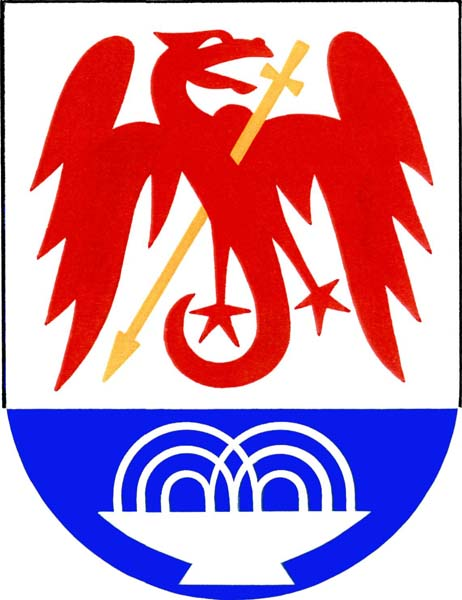
- Flag Coat of arms

- Location in the Czech Republic
- Coordinates: 50°5′55″N 15°11′11″E
- Country: Czech Republic
- Region: Central Bohemian
- District: Kolín
- First mentioned: 1052

Area
  - Total: 10.56 km^{2} (4.08 sq mi)
- Elevation: 189 m (620 ft)

Population (2026-01-01)
  - Total: 2,666
  - Density: 252.5/km^{2} (653.9/sq mi)
- Time zone: UTC+1 (CET)
  - Summer (DST): UTC+2 (CEST)
- Postal code: 281 51
- Website: www.velky-osek.cz

Velký Osek is a municipality and village in Kolín District in the Central Bohemian Region of the Czech Republic. It has about 2,700 inhabitants.

== Etymology ==
The name Osek is a frequent Czech toponym. The word osek or osečený kmen denotes a trimmed trunk. The name Velký Osek means 'great Osek'.

== Geography ==
Velký Osek is located about 8 kilometres (5 mi) north of Kolín and 45 km (28 mi) east of Prague. It lies in a flat landscape in the Central Elbe Table. The Bačovka Stream flows through the municipality. The Elbe River forms the western municipal border.

== History ==
The first written mention of Velký Osek is from 1228, when it was owned by the St. George's Convent in Prague. The construction of the railway in the 19th century started the development of the village.

== Demographics ==
Historical population

| Year | Pop. | ±% |
|---|---|---|
| 1869 | 426 | — |
| 1880 | 765 | +79.6% |
| 1890 | 913 | +19.3% |
| 1900 | 1,172 | +28.4% |
| 1910 | 1,641 | +40.0% |

| Year | Pop. | ±% |
|---|---|---|
| 1921 | 1,903 | +16.0% |
| 1930 | 2,091 | +9.9% |
| 1950 | 2,282 | +9.1% |
| 1961 | 2,388 | +4.6% |
| 1970 | 2,303 | −3.6% |

| Year | Pop. | ±% |
|---|---|---|
| 1980 | 2,308 | +0.2% |
| 1991 | 2,061 | −10.7% |
| 2001 | 2,123 | +3.0% |
| 2011 | 2,188 | +3.1% |
| 2021 | 2,419 | +10.6% |

Source: Censuses

== Transport ==
Velký Osek is located on the railway lines Prague–Kolín and Ústí nad Labem–Kolín.

== Sights ==
The main landmark of Velký Osek is the Church of the Sacred Heart of Jesus. It is a modern church without historical value, which dates from 1934. It has an Art Nouveau interior, which comes from the abolished Church of Saint Wenceslaus in Prague-Bohnice.
