= Lichkov =

- Municipality
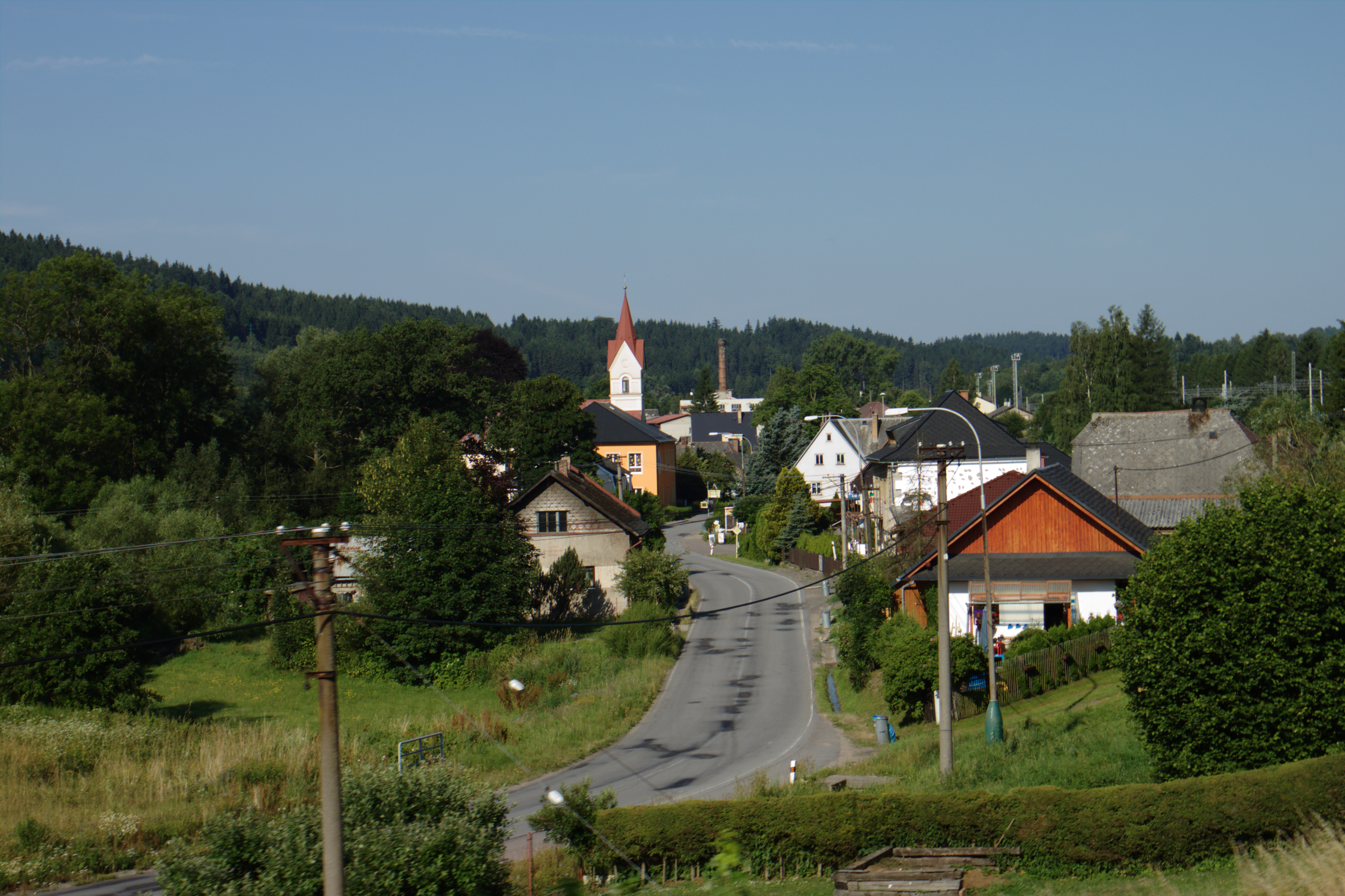
- General view

- Flag Coat of arms

- Location in the Czech Republic
- Coordinates: 50°5′52″N 16°39′58″E
- Country: Czech Republic
- Region: Pardubice
- District: Ústí nad Orlicí
- First mentioned: 1577

Area
  - Total: 9.13 km^{2} (3.53 sq mi)
- Elevation: 528 m (1,732 ft)

Population (2026-01-01)
  - Total: 478
  - Density: 52.4/km^{2} (136/sq mi)
- Time zone: UTC+1 (CET)
  - Summer (DST): UTC+2 (CEST)
- Postal code: 561 68
- Website: www.lichkov.cz

Lichkov (German: Lichtenau) is a municipality and village in Ústí nad Orlicí District in the Pardubice Region of the Czech Republic. It has about 500 inhabitants. In lies in the Orlické Mountains on the border with Poland.

== Demographics ==
Historical population
Year	Pop.	±%
1869	1,190	—
1880	1,323	+11.2%
1890	1,225	−7.4%
1900	1,094	−10.7%
1910	1,041	−4.8%
1921	949	−8.8%
1930	939	−1.1%
1950	652	−30.6%
1961	691	+6.0%
1970	656	−5.1%
1980	600	−8.5%
1991	579	−3.5%
2001	562	−2.9%
2011	505	−10.1%
2021	491	−2.8%
Source: Censuses
