= 1951 Czechoslovak peace pact referendum =

National referendum on peace pact

| 26 May – 17 June 1951 |
- In the name of peace, freedom and happiness of our people, 1. I agree with the call of the World Peace Council for the conclusion of a peace pact (treaty) between the five great powers: the Soviet Union, the United States of America, the People's Republic of China, Great Britain and France.; 2. I demand that the arming of West Germany by the American imperialists be stopped immediately and that the Great Powers jointly solve the German question in a peaceful way.; 3. I condemn the treacherous reaction which incites war against one's own country and in league with the enemies of the republic, with the SS murderers, seeks a new Munich, about the division and destruction of the republic.

Results
| Choice | Votes | % |
|---|---|---|
| Yes | 9,020,522 | 99.33% |
| No | 60,899 | 0.67% |
| Valid votes | 9,081,421 | 100.00% |
| Invalid or blank votes | 0 | 0.00% |
| Total votes | 9,081,421 | 100.00% |
| Registered voters/turnout | | 98.38% |

A referendum on a peace pact for the five great powers was held in Czechoslovakia between 26 May and 17 June 1951. The referendum was in the form of a petition which voters could sign as being for or against. Over 99% signed as being for the proposal.

== Results ==
| Choice | Votes | % |
|---|---|---|
| For | 9,020,522 | 99.33 |
| Against | 60,899 | 0.67 |
| Total | 9,081,421 | 100 |
Source: Direct Democracy
