= Brno hlavní nádraží =

Railway station in Brno, Czech Republic

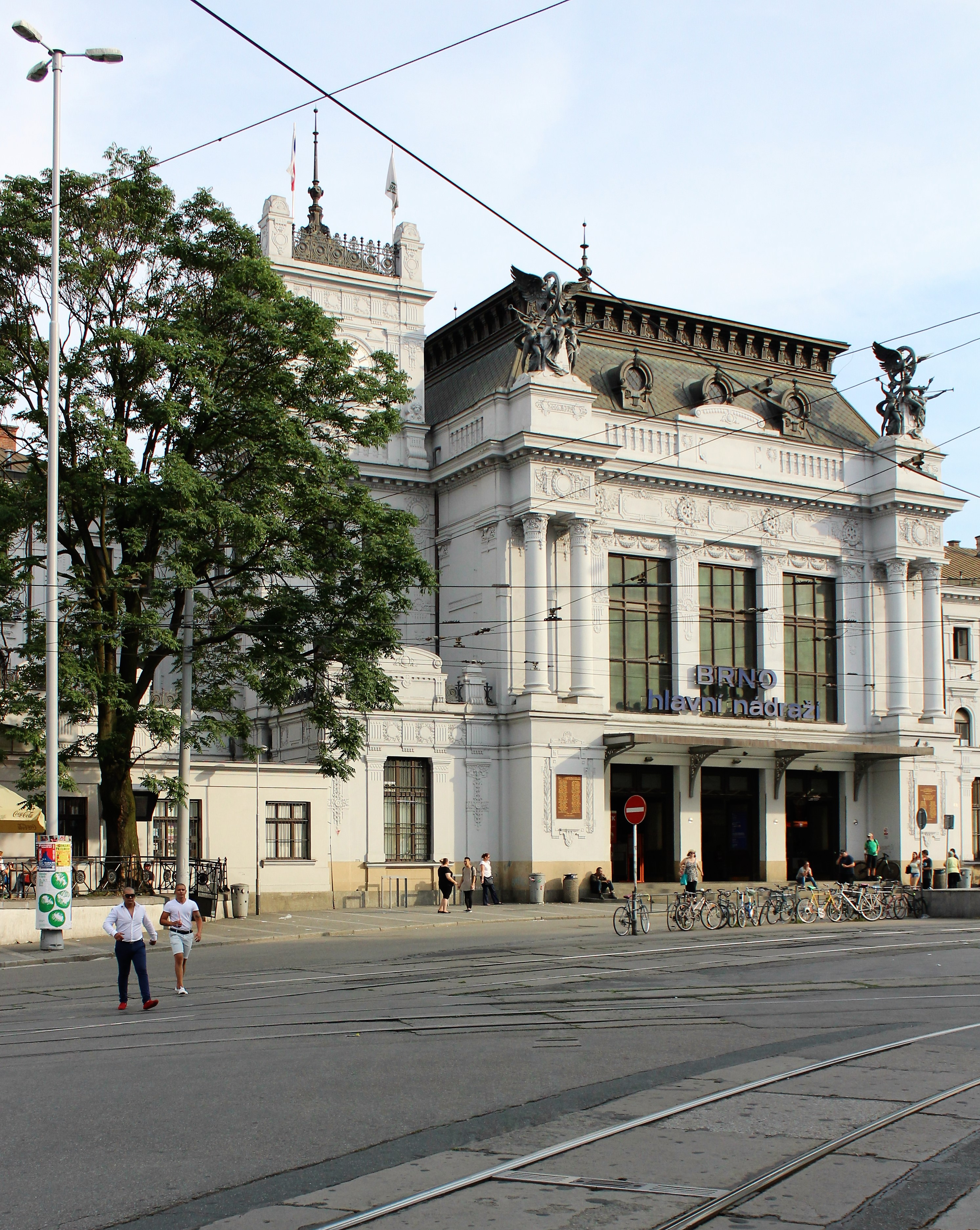
- Front view

General information
- Location: Brno, Nádražní street 418/1; Czech Republic
- Coordinates: 49.1909°N 16.6127°E
- Owner: Správa železnic
- Platforms: 6 with 11 tracks (6 through, 5 terminus)
- Connections: Brno Tramway, Trolleybuses, Buses

Construction
- Architect: Anton Jüngling; Josef Oehm
- Architectural style: Art Nouveau

Other information
- Station code: 54332957

History
- Opened: 16 December 1838; 187 years ago
- Rebuilt: 1902–1904; 1987–1989

Passengers
- 66,100/day (2015)
Location

Brno hlavní nádraží (abbreviated as Brno hl. n.; English: 'Brno main railway station') is the principal railway station in Brno, the second largest in the Czech Republic. The railway station is situated in the city centre on the site of the former city walls. It is one of the oldest railway stations in the Czech Republic, having been in operation since 1839.

== History ==
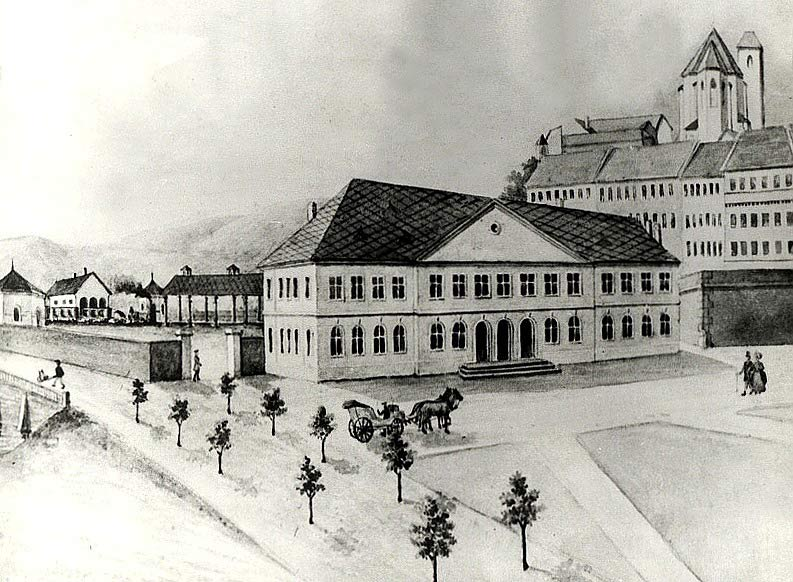
The first building of Brno railway station since September 1838

=== First railway station ===
Brno hlavní nádraží was built in 1838, one of the first railway stations in the world. It was the terminus on the line from Vienna to Brno, one of the branches of Emperor Ferdinand Northern Railway. On 16 November 1838 it was put into operation for trials and exhibitions, and on 7 July 1839 it became fully commercially operational. It was initially designed as a terminal station by Austrian architect Anton Jüngling.

=== Second railway station ===
The railway station became a through station after construction of the rival Northern Railway (Imperial Royal Austrian State Railways) in 1849. As soon as the traffic at the railway station, which was occupied by two competing companies, started to grow, some space limitation caused by bevelled shape between two segments of a polygonal principle Brno Ringstrasse.

=== Third railway station ===
At the turn of the 19th to 20th centuries the side wings of individual companies were connected with a single Concourse (entrance hall), which served to both of them. The author of this partially Art Nouveau building was architect Josef Oehm. The hall has an outline of 18x25 metres. The oldest transverse subway leads in its axis under the platform 4. The hall construction was finished in 1904. Railway station was partially and surfacing (visual only) modernized in 1947 by architect Bohuslav Fuchs, the last time in 1988.

== Platforms ==
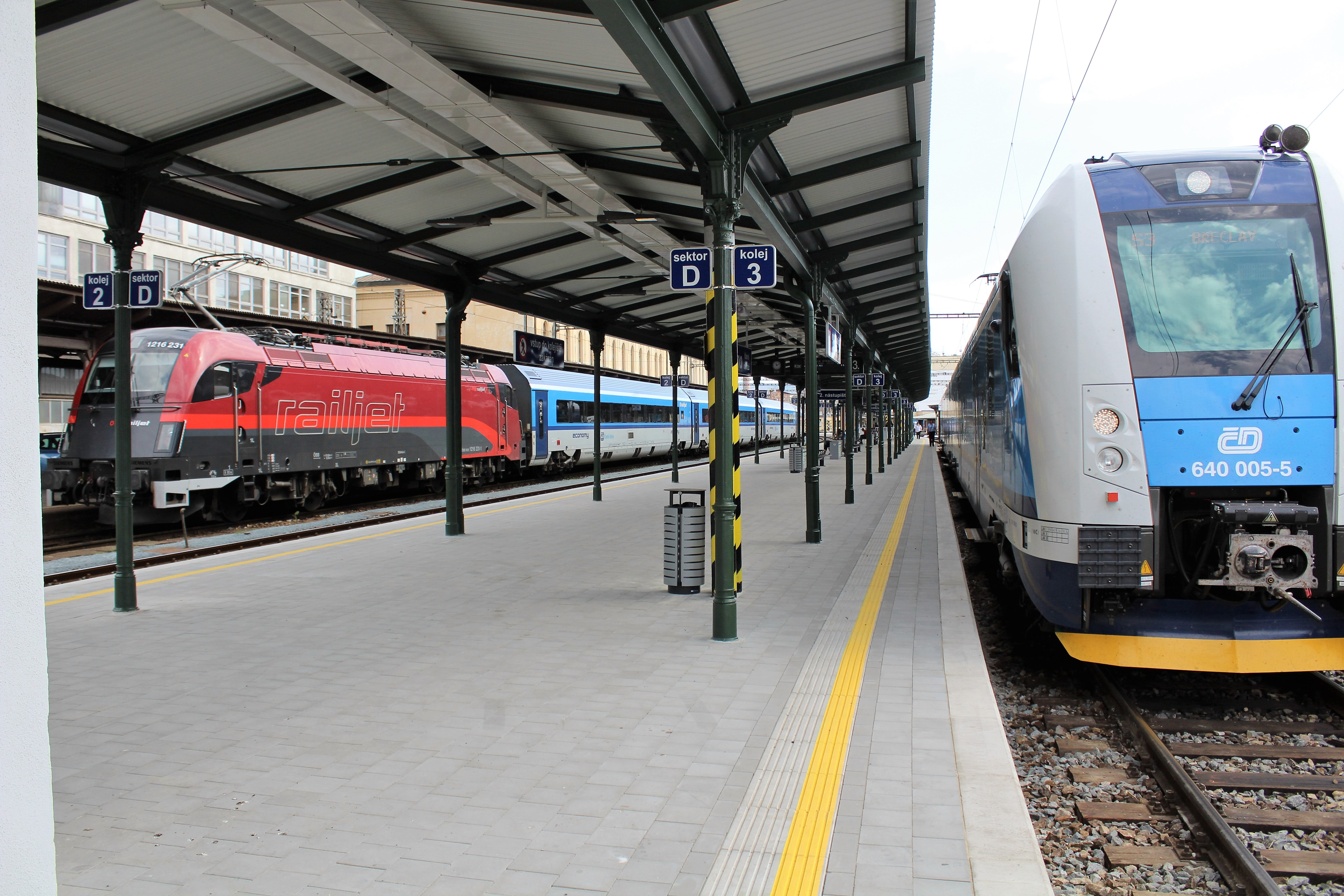
A Railjet train to Prague (left) and RegioPanter (right)

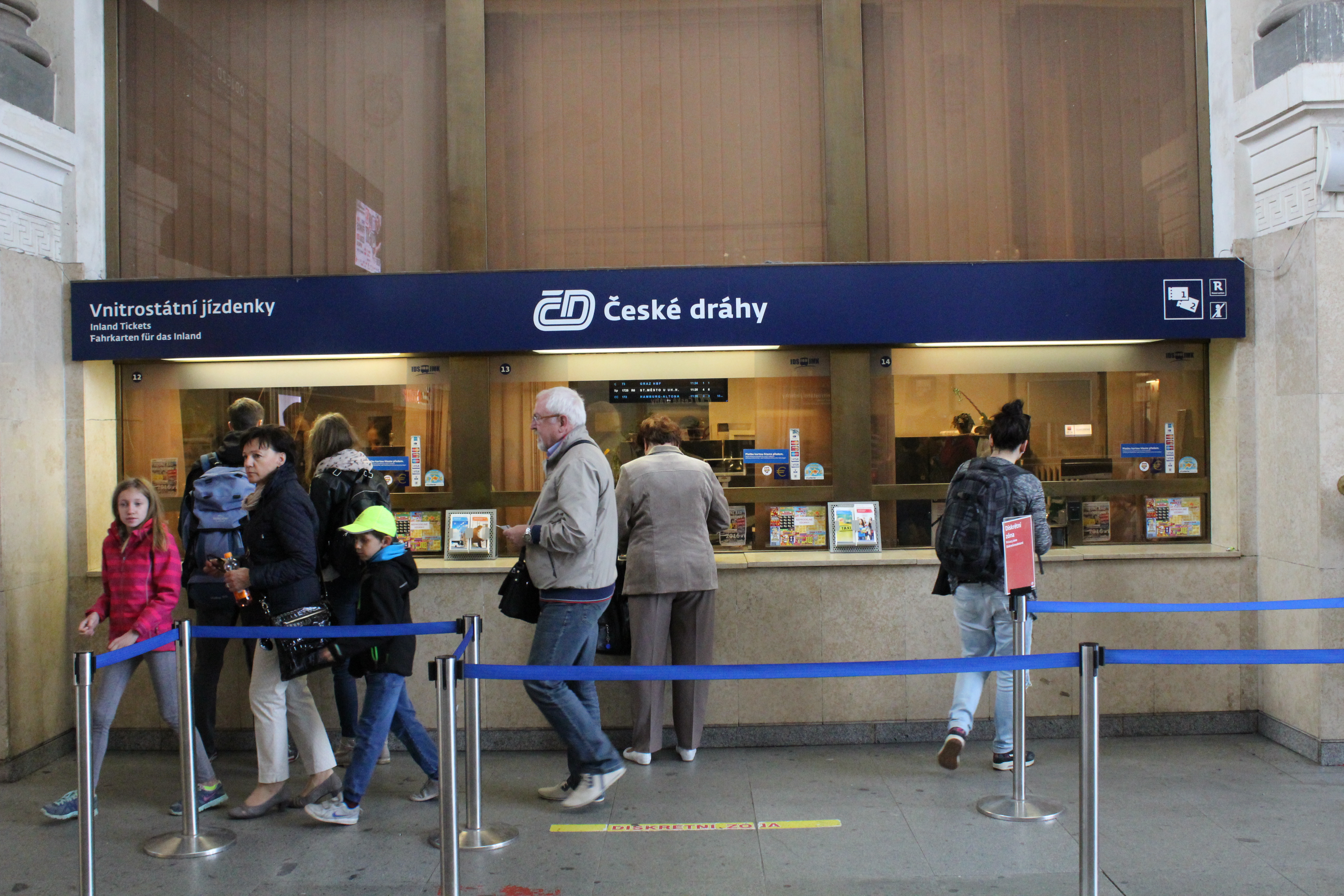
The ticket office in the main hall

Brno hlavní nádraží has 4 through platforms with 6 lines and 2 terminal platforms, to make a total of 6 platforms. The through platforms are 415 and 310 metres long and built in an S-shape. The terminal platforms are straight and 350 metres long. The platforms are at least 9 metres wide.

== Routes ==
The international corridor in the Czech Republic, with main cities marked including Brno

Brno hlavní nádraží is an important station on the pan-international corridor passing through the country (Děčín–Prague–Pardubice–Brno–Břeclav), with international trains serving the station to and from Germany. Most trains travel via Česká Třebová and the Svitava valley, the route numbered 260 in the Czech timetable. Others take route 250 via Kutná Hora and Havlíčkův Brod. Trains continue to Břeclav and thence into Slovakia, Hungary and Austria.

It is also located on five other lines, three of which carry intercity trains:

- 240 Brno - Jihlava – České Budějovice – Plzeň
- 250 Brno - Havlíčkův Brod – Prague
- 300 Brno - Přerov – Olomouc/Ostrava
- 340 Brno - Uherské Hradiště
- 244 Brno - Hrušovany nad Jevišovkou

== Future plans ==
Currently Brno station is approaching at full capacity and therefore in need of expansion, however its location on the edge of the historic center of the city prevents that. Capacity problems are just in one part of the railway station, on the southern station head (switch system), where is a regional transport. The question of how to cope with the substance of railway station has been being discussed for several decades. The idea of moving railway station to the new location, 550 metres southern, emerged already in the 1920s. It was after a sudden increase of transport capacity between 1923 and 1924 (26% more). Such an increase has never happened again. Experts who worked for Brno before World War II abandoned this idea. Later on this idea reappeared several times in the new contexts. In 1970 railway station was relieved from freight transport which was transferred to the modernized track on the South. Since then the railway station has been intended purely for passenger transportation.

The city council have made plans to build a new station in a remote location – 960 metres southeast from the city where personal and cargo transport would be reunited again. This possibility is confronted with a continuous opposition of experts and public. Already in 2004 this situation invoked a citizens-initiated referendum. However, this referendum did not become binding for city because of the insufficient turnout (25%). Legislation required 50% turnout at that time. The overwhelming majority of 85% of voters was for keeping railway station on the current place. Nowadays citizens have initiated a new referendum, which was held simultaneously with regional and senate election on the 7 and 8 October 2016. According to the current legislation only 35% turnout is sufficient for legally binding outcome of the referendum.

A new main train station is scheduled to begin construction in 2028 and is estimated to be opened between 2032 and 2035. This will effectively move the main station about 800 meters south to its current location.
