= Kunčice nad Labem =

- Municipality
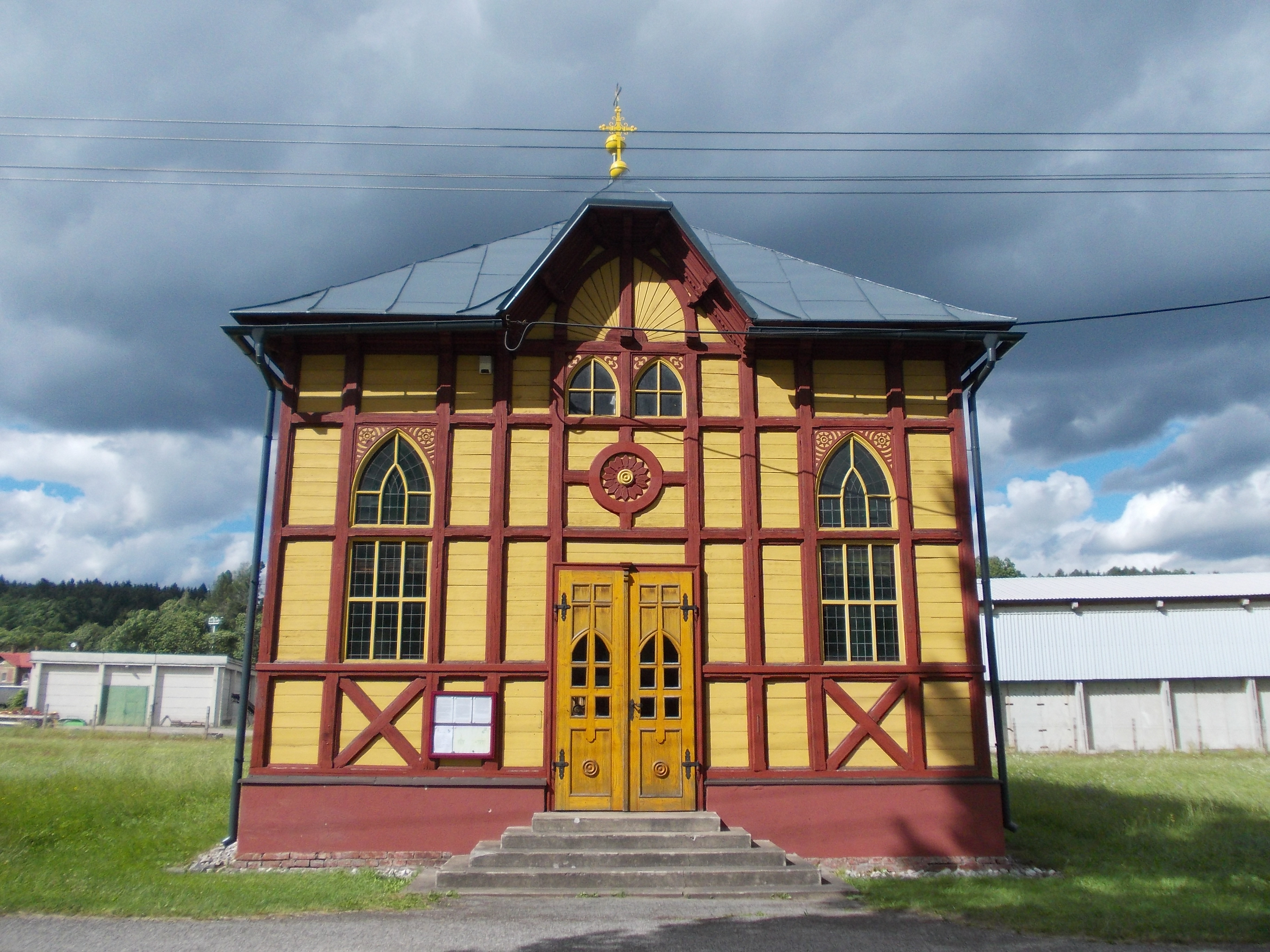
- Chapel of the Virgin Mary

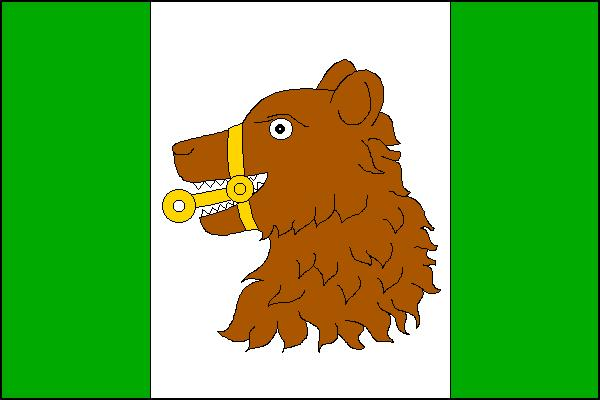
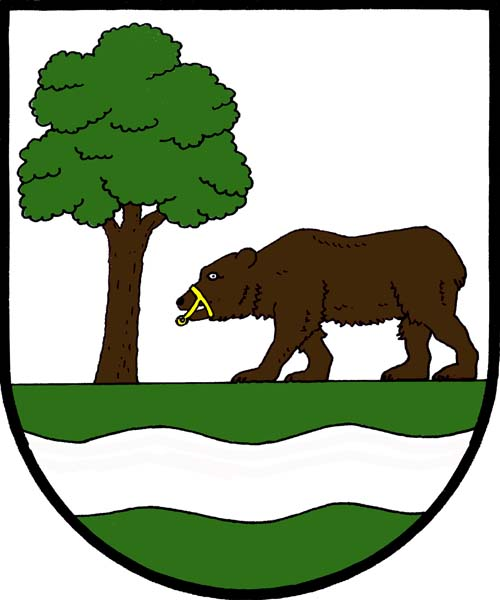
- Flag Coat of arms

- Location in the Czech Republic
- Coordinates: 50°34′55″N 15°37′10″E
- Country: Czech Republic
- Region: Hradec Králové
- District: Trutnov
- First mentioned: 1454

Area
  - Total: 3.07 km^{2} (1.19 sq mi)
- Elevation: 407 m (1,335 ft)

Population (2026-01-01)
  - Total: 588
  - Density: 192/km^{2} (496/sq mi)
- Time zone: UTC+1 (CET)
  - Summer (DST): UTC+2 (CEST)
- Postal code: 543 61
- Website: kuncice.cz

Kunčice nad Labem is a municipality and village in Trutnov District in the Hradec Králové Region of the Czech Republic. It has about 600 inhabitants.

== Demographics ==
Historical population
Year	Pop.	±%
1869	532	—
1880	526	−1.1%
1890	580	+10.3%
1900	703	+21.2%
1910	689	−2.0%
1921	650	−5.7%
1930	686	+5.5%
1950	464	−32.4%
1961	551	+18.8%
1970	549	−0.4%
1980	531	−3.3%
1991	545	+2.6%
2001	573	+5.1%
2011	530	−7.5%
2021	540	+1.9%
Source: Censuses
