= Havlíčkův Brod railway station =

Railway station in Havlíčkův Brod, Czech Republic

Havlíčkův Brod
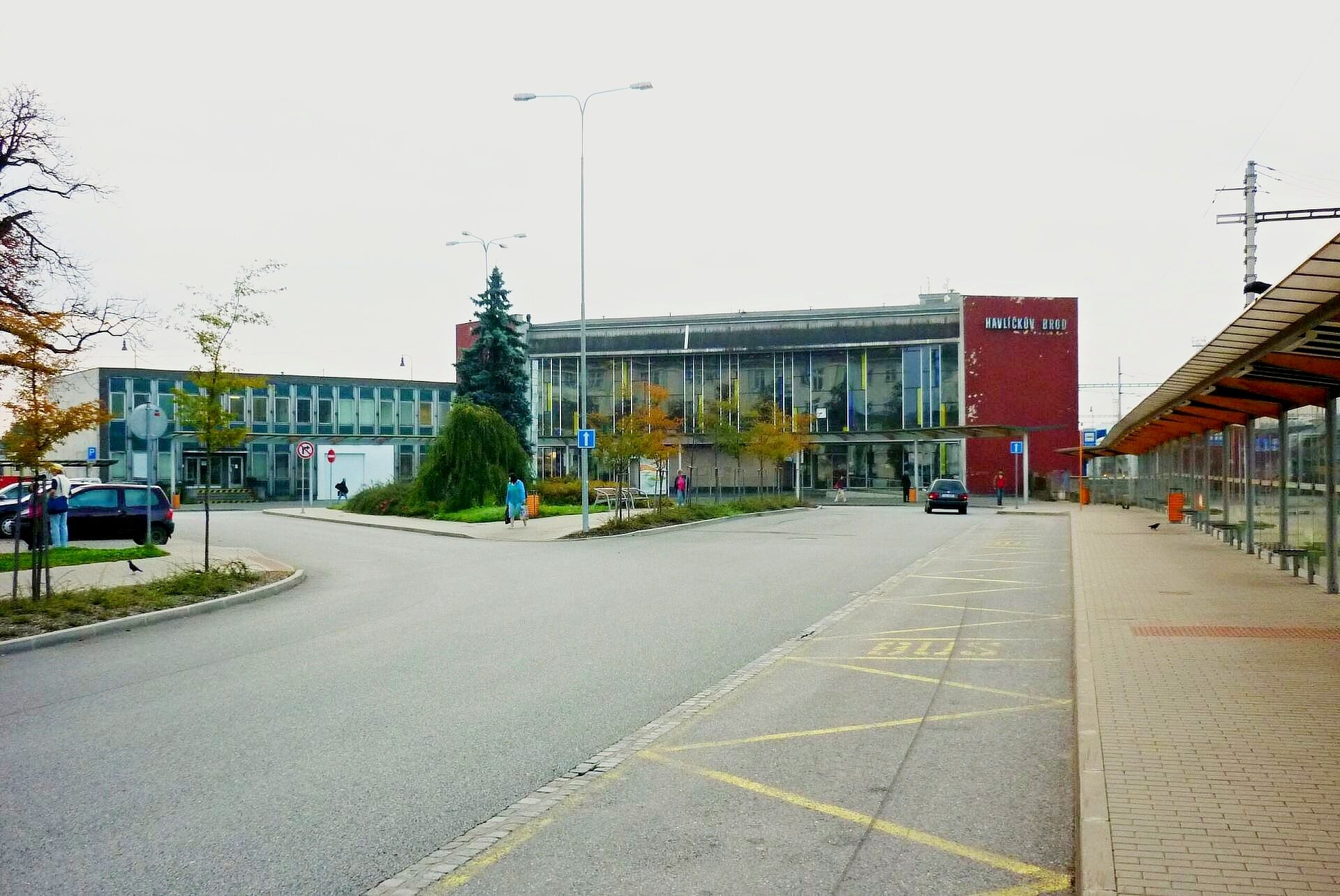
- Havlíčkův Brod railway station

General information
- Location: Nádražní 72, 580 01; Havlíčkův Brod; Czech Republic
- Coordinates: 49°35′56″N 15°35′17″E
- Owner: Czech Republic
- Lines: Havlíčkův Brod - Veselí nad Lužnicí (225); Havlíčkův Brod – Kolín (230); Havlíčkův Brod – Humpolec (237); Kolín – Pardubice-Rosice nad Labem (238); Prague - Brno - Kúty (250)
- Platforms: 6 (11)
- Tracks: 25

Other information
- Station code: 54542134

History
- Opened: 22 December 1870; 155 years ago
- Rebuilt: 1970
Location
- Location within Czech Republic

Havlíčkův Brod is a railway station in Havlíčkův Brod in Vysočina Region of the Czech Republic.

== History ==
The first train left the station in the direction of Jihlava on December 21, 1870. In 1898 a track was connected to Žďár nad Sázavou. A new railway station building was completed in 1970.

In front of the building is the town bus station.

== Services ==
| Preceding station | České dráhy | Following station |
|---|---|---|
| terminus | Stopping trains | Mírovka toward Jihlava |
| terminus | Stopping trains | Břevnice toward Pardubice hl.n. or Pardubice centrum |
| terminus | Stopping trains | Dolík toward Humpolec |
| terminus | Stopping trains | Pohledští Dvořáci toward Žďár nad Sázavou |
| terminus | Stopping trains | Havlíčkův Brod-Perknov toward Zruč nad Sázavou |
| terminus | Stopping trains | Havlíčkův Brod-Perknov toward Ledeč nad Sázavou |
| terminus | Stopping trains | Okrouhlice toward Kolín |
| terminus | Regional fast trains | Břevnice toward Pardubice hl.n. or Pardubice centrum |
| terminus | Regional fast trains | Jihlava toward Dačice, Dačice město, or Slavonice |
| terminus | Fast trains | Světlá nad Sázavou toward Praha-Vršovice |
| terminus or Světlá nad Sázavou | Fast trains | Přibyslav toward Brno hl.n. |
