= 2013 Plzeň shopping center referendum =

- 12 January 2013
- Should the city of Plzeň immediately take all steps within its independent jurisdiction, to prevent the construction of commercial facilities on the site of the House Culture Inwest?

Results
Choice	Votes	%
Yes	35,543	65.47%
No	18,744	34.53%
Valid votes	54,287	98.37%
Invalid or blank votes	900	1.63%
Total votes	55,187	100.00%
Registered voters/turnout	132,929	41.52%

Plzeň shopping center referendum was held on 12 January 2013. Plzeň citizens refused shopping center Corso to be built near historical center of the city.

== Campaign ==
Opponents of the shopping center called their campaign "Yes for Plzeň." It was started on 19 December 2012. Opponents argumented that the council focuses only on economical aspect of the center and that the center wouldn't fit in the historical part of the city. The company Amadeus Real that invested in the center started their own campaign for the shopping center. The company argumented by new jobs for citizens. The city council started its own informational campaign on 5 December. It was focused on negative impacts to the city if the shopping center is refused.

Supporters of the center included Milan Chovanec while opponents were supported by Jiří Pospíšil.

== Results ==
Choice	Votes	%
Yes	35,543	65.5
No	18,744	34.5
Invalid/blank votes	900	–
Total	55,187	100
Registered voters/turnout	132,929	41.52
