= Žižkov tram depot =

- Vozovna Žižkov
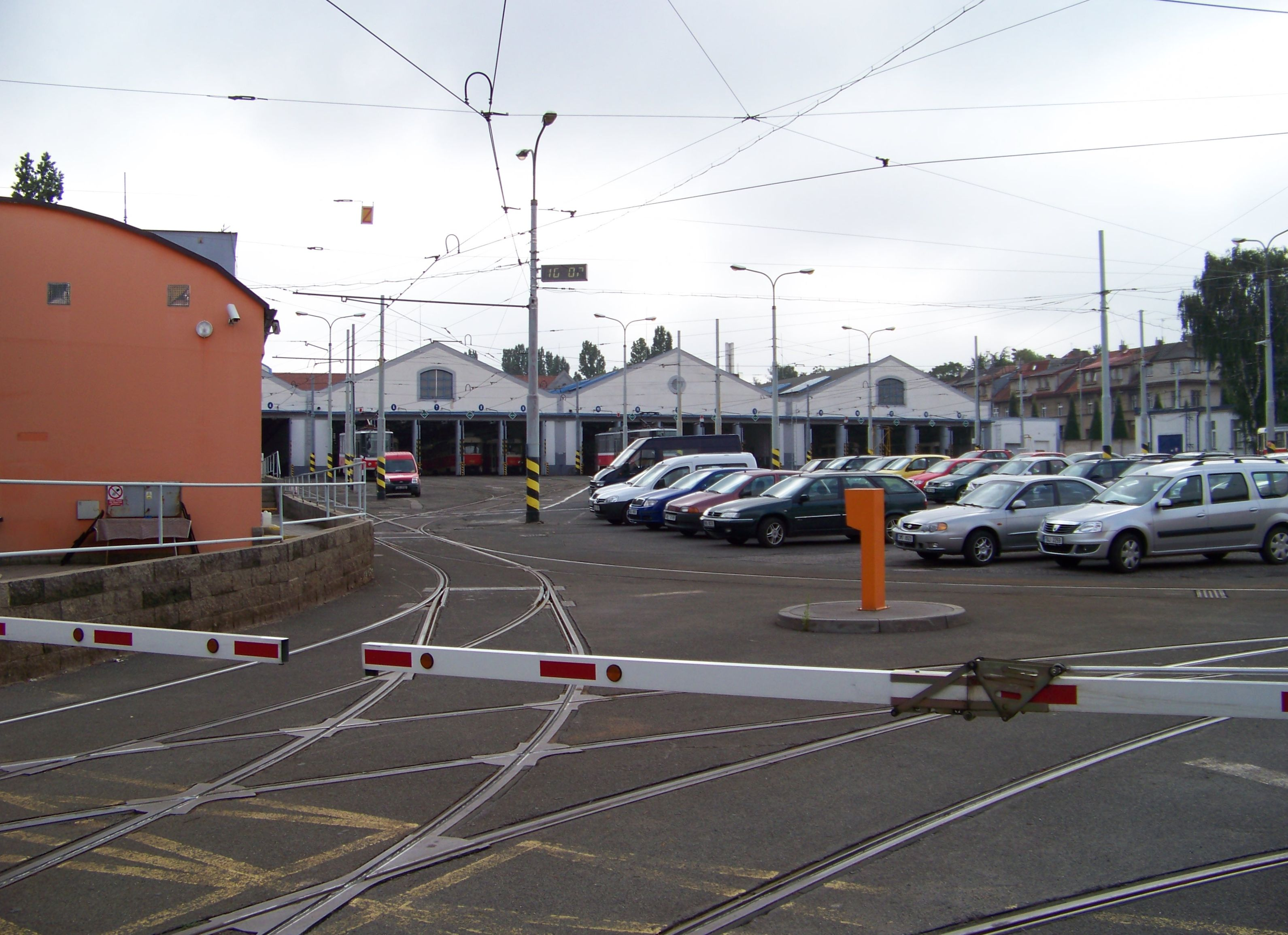
- the depot in 2011
- Interactive map of the Žižkov tram depot area

General information
- Location: Prague 3, Czech Republic
- Coordinates: 50°5′25″N 14°28′38″E

Žižkov tram depot (Czech: Vozovna Žižkov) is a tram depot in Žižkov that has been part of the Prague tram network since 1912. The depot celebrated its centenary in 2012. There are seven tram depots in Prague (eight if you count the museum in old depot in Střešovice, nine if you count workshop depot in Hostivař), Žižkov is second oldest of those seven.

Žižkov depot is currently (September 2014) home to 77 Tatra T3SUCS trams, 6 T3R.PV trams and 41 T6A5 trams which are operated in pairs mostly on tram lines 1, 9, 11, 12, 14, 24 and 25.

All T3SUCS in Prague are supposed to be replaced with a new type of tram - Škoda 15 T within the next few years. More than a hundred 15T's were delivered (to Pankrác and Vokovice depot), and many of T3SUCS were already put out of service, stored at yard of workshop-depot in Hostivař, and offered to purchase. However, due to technical issues of Škoda 14 T trams which had to be withdrawn from service, some of the old T3SUCS are now temporally back.

It is not certain yet if Žižkov will operate 15T tram instead of T3SUCS, or some other depot will get new 15T trams and Žižkov will get some older trams from other depots, such as T6A5 from Strašnice tram depot or T3R.PV from Vokovice tram depot. The T6A5 model is also old and not much prospective; those cars located in Žižkov depot were built in 1996 and 1997. Elimination of this model is expected since the last of 250 15T's will be delivered in 2018.
