= Trams in Prague =

Tram system of the city of Prague, Czechia

Prague tramway network

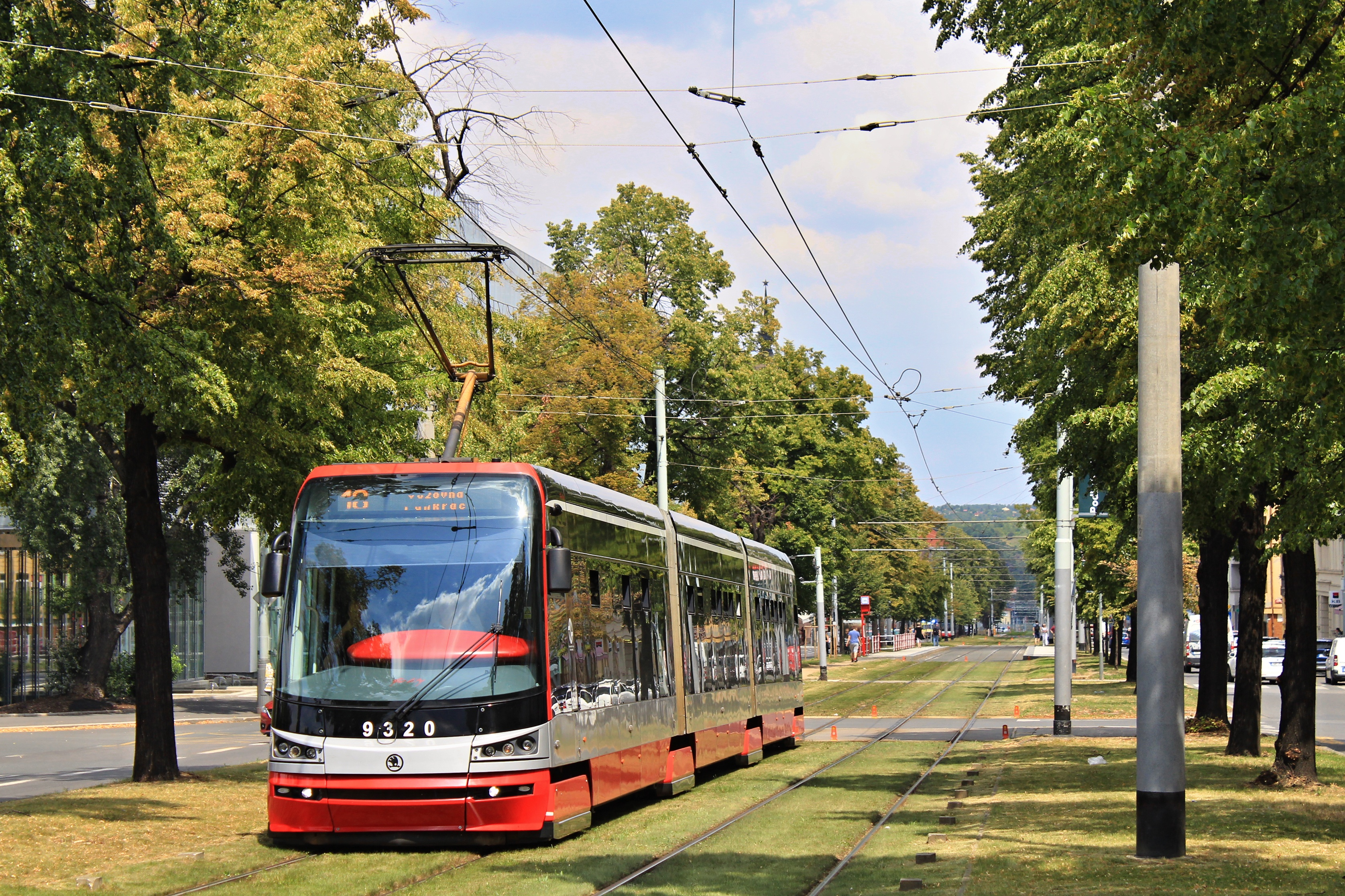
- Prague Škoda 15 T tram in Dejvice

Overview
- Locale: Prague, Czech Republic
- Transit type: Tramway
- Number of lines: 35 (26 day routes, 9 night routes) (as of June 2021)
- Number of stations: 289
- Annual ridership: 373.5 million (2018)
- Website: Prague Integrated Transport

Operation
- Began operation: 1875 (horse); 1891 (electric)
- Operators: Dopravní podnik hlavního města Prahy (English: Prague Public Transit Company)

Technical
- System length: 518 km (322 mi) – total route length 144 km (89 mi) – track length (2022)
- Track gauge: 1,435 mm (4 ft 8 1/2 in) standard gauge
- Electrification: Overhead line (600 V DC)
Tram routes in Prague

The Prague tramway network is the largest tram network in the Czech Republic, consisting of 144 km (89 mi) of standard gauge (1,435 mm) track, 691 tram vehicles and 26 daytime routes, 2 historical and 9 night routes with a total route length of 518 km (322 mi). It is operated by Dopravní podnik hlavního města Prahy a.s., a company owned by the city of Prague. The network is a part of the Prague Integrated Transport, the city's integrated public transport system.

Prague's first horsecar tram line was opened in 1875, and the first electric tram ran in 1891. Expansion plans were scaled down since the 1970s with the introduction of Prague Metro; however, trams still serve a crucial transit and tourist element serving Prague's city centre as well as Prague's suburbs.

The Prague tram system (including the Petřín funicular) served 373.4 million passengers in 2018, the highest number in the world after Budapest. Rolling stock for the network consists solely of trams built locally – mainly classic Tatra trams and low-floor Škoda stock.

== History ==
=== Beginnings ===
==== Horse trams ====
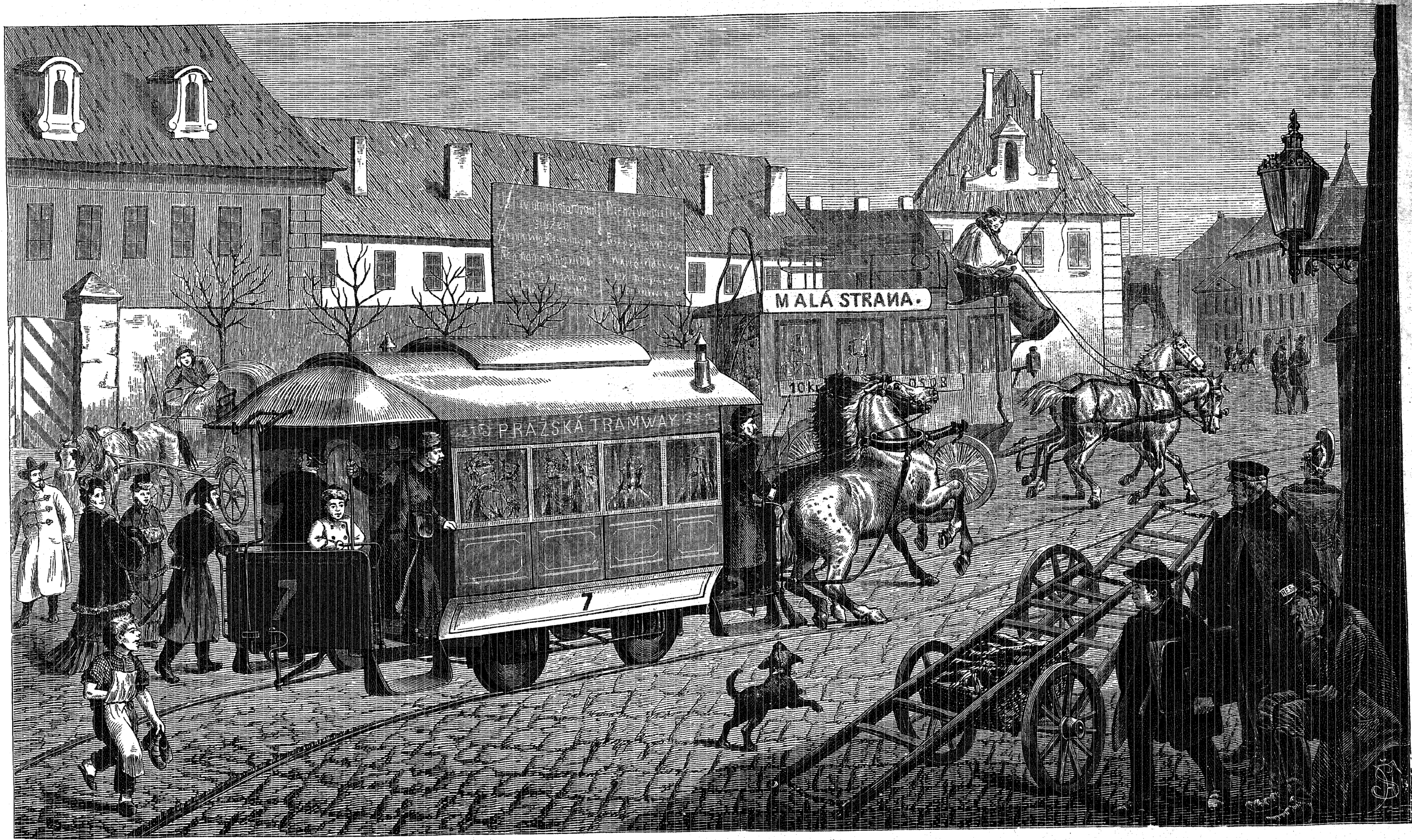
Horse trams in Prague in 1876

In 1873, Bernhard Kollmann and Zdeněk Kinský founded the Anglo-Czech Tramway Company. On 5 March 1873, the company received a concession to build and operate a horse-drawn street railway using a horse-drawn tram. Financial reasons meant the plan was eventually not implemented.

The first tracks were laid in the streets of Prague from 3 or 4 May 1875, and the first railway section was laid along the former riding barracks (today's Palladium) to the former U Bažanta Inn, which stood on the site of today's YMCA Palace. The first route of the horse-drawn tram was put into operation by the Belgian entrepreneur Eduard Otlet on 23 September 1875 at 3:15 PM, on the Karlín - National Theater route. The line stretched 3.4 kilometers and was operated by the General Direction der Prager Tramway company.

This way lead to the theater, along the Národní Třída street. Tracks went approximately in direction of today's Metro Line B. In 1876, the track was extended west of the National Theater, through the Újezd hub to the Smíchov Railway Station. In 1882, the network was extended to Vinohrady and Žižkov. At that time, they were independent suburbs of Prague, but now they are incorporated into city. In 1883, the size of the entire network consisted of 19.43 kilometres (12.07 miles) of rail.

==== Finding the right successor ====
By 1886, various ideas had been floated for steam trams. On September 30, 1890, the mayor of Královské Vinohrady, Jan Friedländer, proposed to the Prague City Council the construction of three lines to serve the city of Královské Vinohrady with the idea to connect them with Prague. A special committee appointed by the Prague City Council rejected the project and recommended electric trams.

=== Electric trams ===
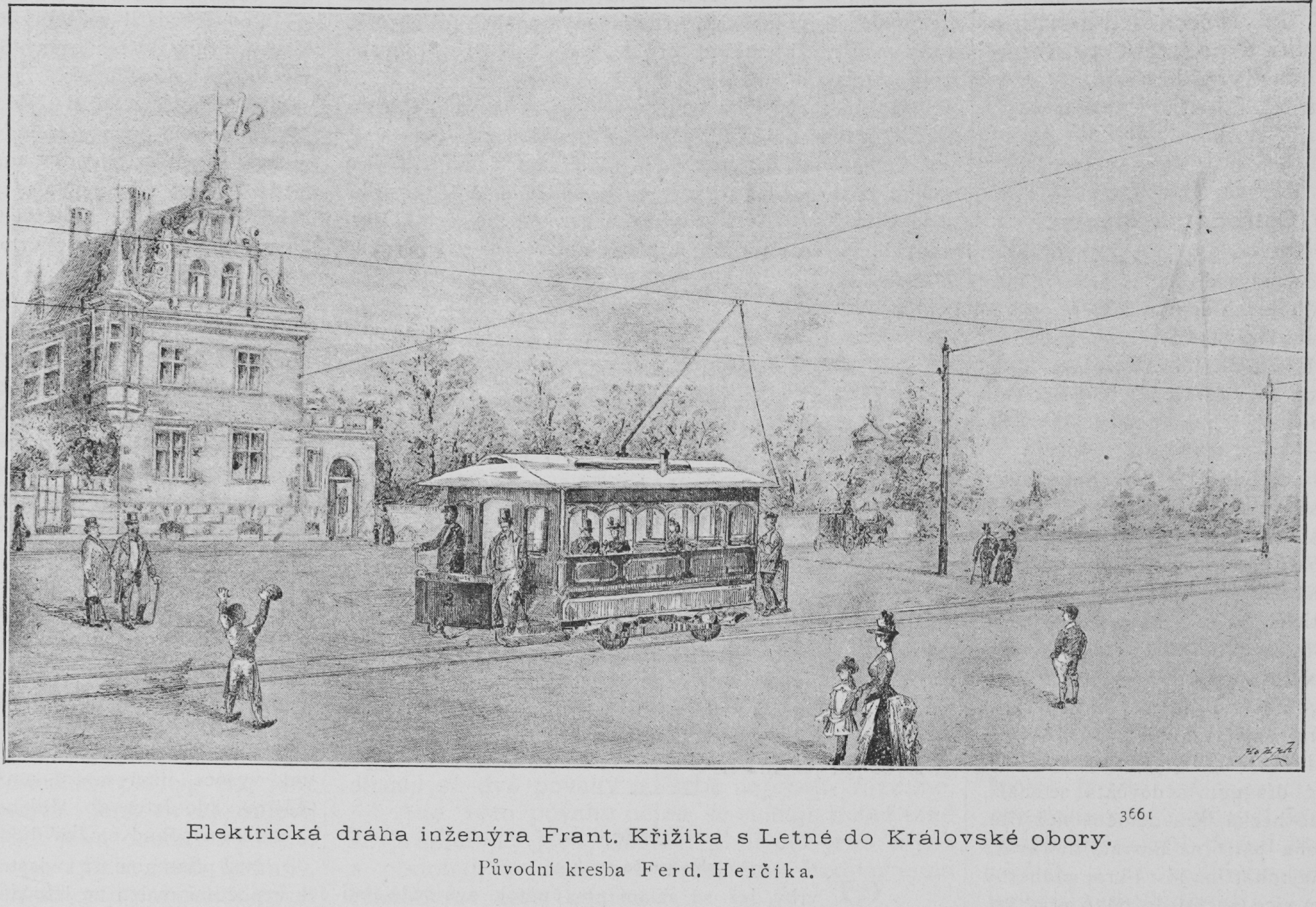
An 1890 drawing showing the design for Prague's first electric tram

In 1891, Prague got its first electric tram line located in Letná, a popular place for recreation in Prague. This line cs:Elektrická dráha na Letné v Praze had mainly a promotional purpose and led from the upper terminal of the Letná funicular cs:Lanová dráha na Letnou to the pavilion of the Jubilee Exhibition through Ovenecká street. Two years later, the line was extended to the Governor's Summer Palace cs:Místodržitelský letohrádek extending the line to a total length of 1.4 kilometres (0.87 mi). František Křižík, who owned Electric Railway company at the time, is credited as the creator of Prague's first electric tram line.

On 19 March 1896, Křižík opened a second, more important, tram line, which went from Florenc to Libeň and Vysočany, joining the industrial suburbs of Prague with its residential area in the center. On 27 June 1897, Otlet's horse railway was bought and taken over by Elektrické podniky král. hl. m. Prahy. The new company had started construction of new tracks along with electrification and by 1905, the entire network was electrified.

In a continuation of the rapid growth of Prague's trams, another new lined was opened in 1897. This time it was a suburban route from Smíchov to Košíře. It was named "Hlaváčkova electric railway". Later, a new passenger railroad in Královské Vinohrady was opened. The Prague to Vinohrady stretch spanned 5.8 kilometres (3.6 mi), had 17 stations, and passed through Nové město (New Town). At another side of the city, thanks to above-listed railway between Anděl and Smíchov, it allowed Prague tram to provide one-seat-ride between Košíře and Vinohrady. Eventually, the municipal enterprise, Prague Transportation Company was formed.

=== Early 20th century ===
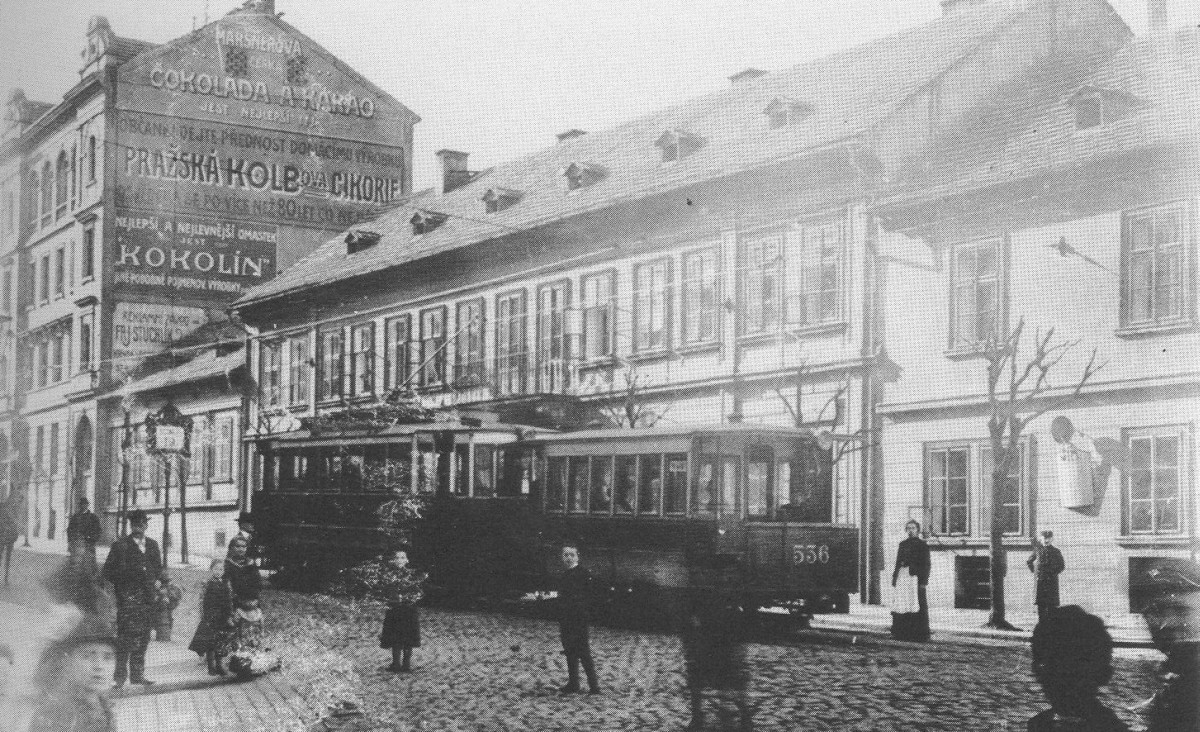
Tram with trailer in Prague in the early twentieth century

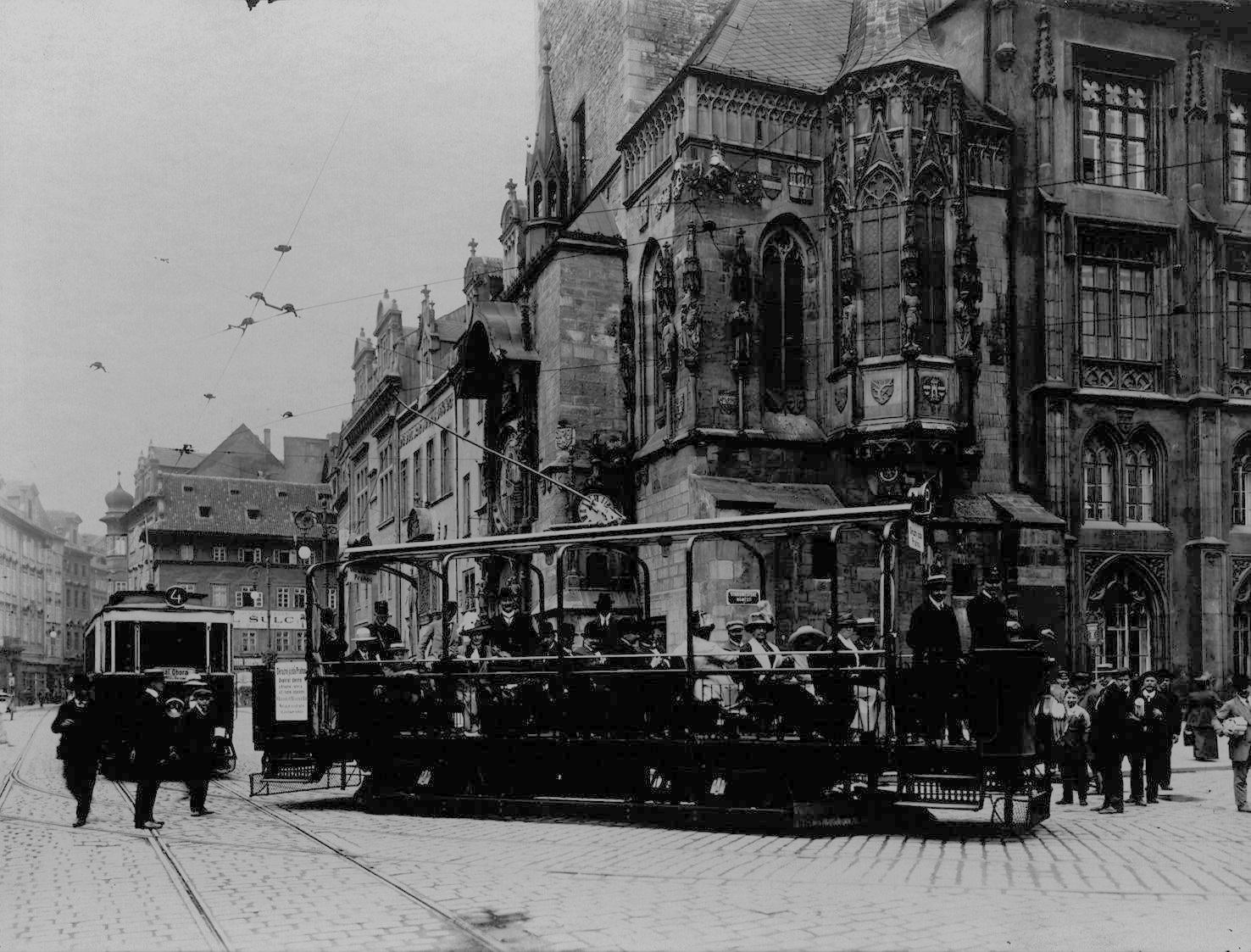
An open tram in the Old Town Square, 1913

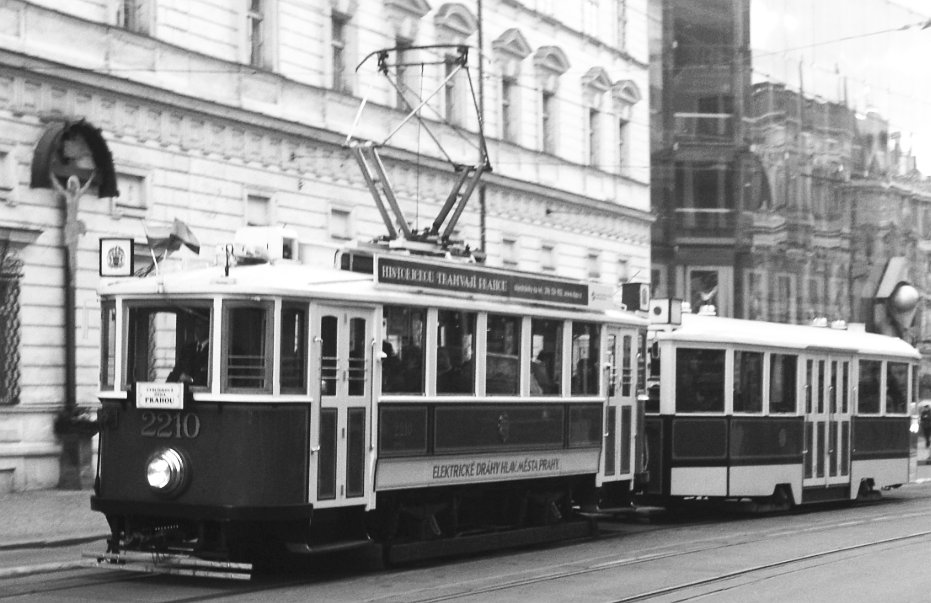
A vintage tram with trailer still in operation

In the early 20th century, a monopoly was formed to provide transportation in the city. It began to electrify the horse tram and soon the Otlet Prague trams came under the control of competitors of the electric enterprises. As the monopoly grew, it took over the tracks of the rest of its private competitors. The last private track, the work of František Křižík, was transferred to the city by the year of 1907. In 1905, the electrification works were finished. Even the last horse tram route through the Charles Bridge was electrified (also a project of František Křižík). The tram route through the Charles Bridge operated until 1908.

=== World War One ===
The war added new strain to the tram network. A lack of sufficient horse-drawn transport meant that trams were used to carry war materials, fuel, raw materials, and food. Additionally, the need for ammunition led to trams being melted down for their metal and used to produce grenades and bombs leading to further fall in capacities. This pressure came to an end when the newly formed First Czechoslovak Republic signed a peace treaty. By 1921, the network returned to its full operational capacity.

=== First Republic ===
The tram network began to expand rapidly again – mainly to the newly built quarters of the expanded metropolitan Prague, such as Dejvice, Nusle and Žižkov. In 1927, the length of the network exceeded 100 km. At that time the new unidirectional tram types were introduced and the dead-end terminals were rebuilt into loops.

The growing size of the city and the tram network and the increasing distances began to slow down traffic from one end of the metropolis to the other, as the number of lines and passing cars continued to grow. The main thoroughfares in the centre, such as Na Příkopě street and Wenceslas Square could not cope with traffic increases. Efforts to solve this situation appeared with various considerations arising.

=== Second World War ===
As a result of the German occupation, right-hand traffic was hastily introduced on 26 March 1939, to which Czechoslovakia had already committed itself in 1926. The entrances to the trams and individual stops had to be quickly remodeled. There was a decree also issued in which Jews were excluded from tram transport from Saturday afternoon until late Sunday night.

In 1942, all-night tram operation was introduced. Threat of bombing by Allied planes meant that cars had to be darkened. Despite all these difficulties, the entire network functioned reliably and the transport performance even exceeded those of the pre-war. In the end, Allied bombing disrupted tram operations until the end of the war. On 18 January 1945, due to wartime necessity, night operation was cancelled and from 5 to 16 May 1945 the tram operation was completely interrupted. A gradual reintroduction of operation was carried out until 17 December 1945.

=== Post Second World War ===
In 1951 began the replacement of two-axle tram railcars, by new modern series of ČKD production, at first by Tatra T1 and since 1962 by Tatra T3.

The increase of cars on Prague's road network meant that future sections could not be built using traditional methods, and certain sections would have to use reserved tracks.

Prague's tram network suffered from unreliability and, above all, unsatisfactory cruising speed in the entire tram system. A decision was made to build a subsurface tram. Digging began in 1966 and later, this section was used for metro line C. On 1 January 1960, the first of the lines in the historical centre of the city was cancelled: the single-track section leading through Pařížská Street, Old Town Square and narrow Celetná Street, where it was no longer possible to operate fast and modern transport.

=== Development of the metro and cancellation of tram plans ===
After the construction of the underground tramway started, various studies concluded that it would be more advantageous to convert the system to a conventional underground tramway in stages after completion (the so-called underground concept with an intermediate underground tramway). This was confirmed by Government Resolution No 437 of 30 November 1966, based on the results of studies by experts from the Czechoslovakia, the USSR, Sweden and Germany.

In May 1967, on the basis of a cabinet meeting, Prime Minister Lenárt asked the Soviet government to send a group of experts to review the whole concept once again. The team headed by I. T. Yefimov recommended to launch the intermediate stage of the subsurface tram. The management of the Transport Company and the Prague National Committee agreed with these results and the government decision of 9 August 1967 finally confirmed the metro project. Opponents such as Zbyněk Jirsák and Jindřich Horešovský have previously pointed out the disadvantages of this solution, such as the need to build ramps, etc.

The first metro line C opened to the public in May 1974. The gradual expansion of the metro limited the development of the tram network and also opened the question of its possible replacement by buses (bus replacement was happening in some other cities of the former Czechoslovakia). Due to the rapid development of bus transport, new metro lines to peripheral housing estates were not created and bus lines were preferred instead. In 1978, Prague launched its second metro line A, and in 1985, metro line B was launched.

Tram lines parallel to the metro were cancelled: in Pankrác in the 70s, in the 80s in the city centre – the line on Wenceslas Square was removed, Na Florenci – 1983, Na Příkopě – 1984. Tracks existing for more than a hundred years have been replaced by pedestrian zones. The focus of tram transport in central Prague thus rapidly shifted from Wenceslas Square to Charles Square.

=== Recent times ===
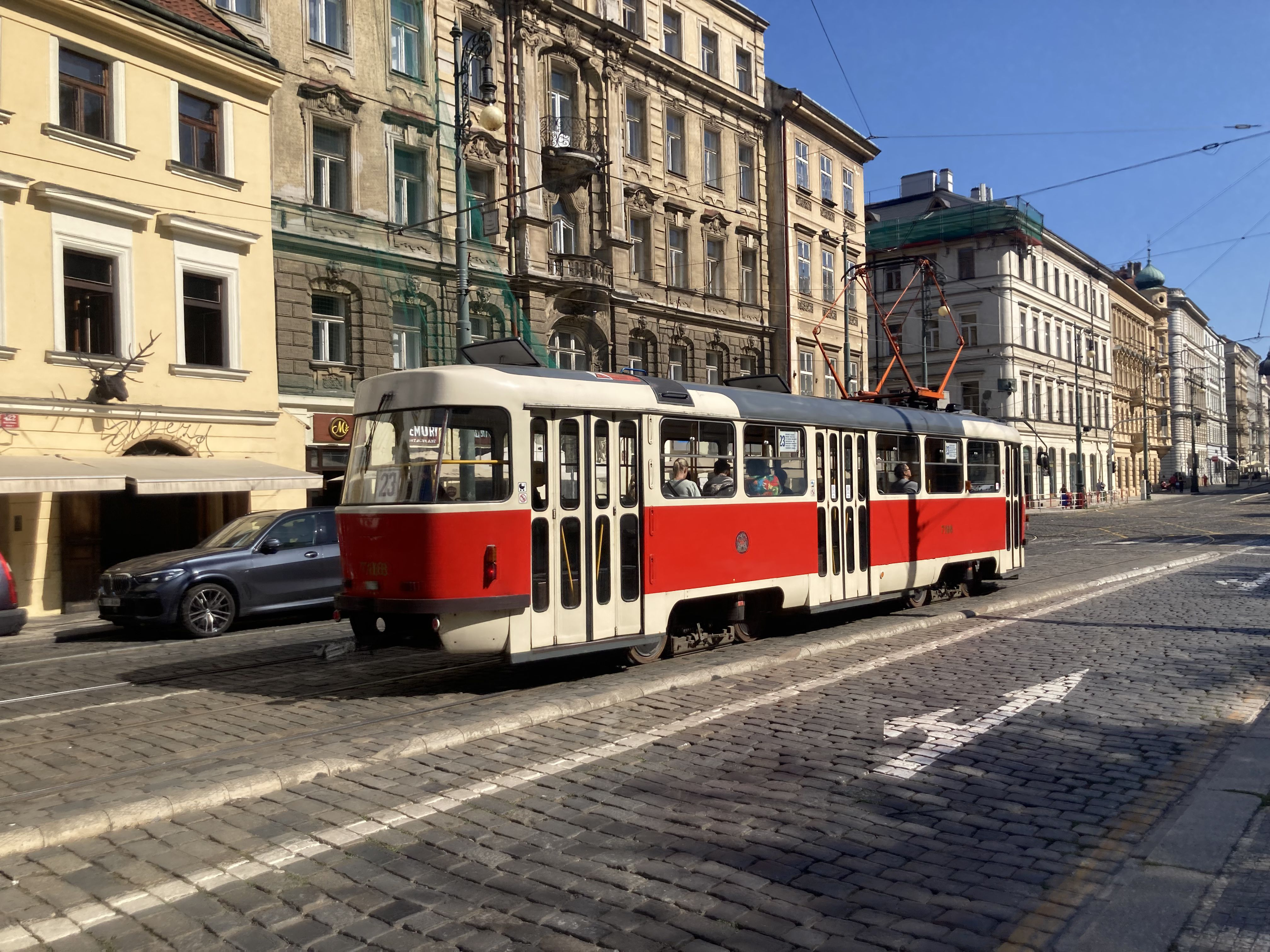
Tram line 23 leaving Újezd station

During the 1980s, the Communist government understood the advantages of modern tram networks and began replicating tram transport from Western Europe. Prague network began to be appreciated again as a mode of transport. At that time, tram transport held about 30% of the representation on all trips in Prague public transport. The network therefore was still of key importance to the city of Prague.

The Communist government began ordering new tramcars, such as the Tatra KT8D5 as well as more Tatra T3 and started constructing new track sections, most of which were completed soon after the Velvet Revolution. There weren't many new tracks opened during the first 20 years after the revolution, since much more attention was paid to modernizations of existing tracks and vehicles, causing major service disruptions every summer. Concrete panels of the BKV type were used en masse for the reconstruction of most of the network, first being used in Prague in 1977 on Dělnická Street.

New lines began to emerge again, first with the section to the Řepy housing estate (1988), followed by construction of Ohrada – Palmovka estacade that was coupled with the relocation of the line to Palmovka (1990). A new track was built to Modřany in 1995. Since 1986, some new sections have also been built on a separate trackbed – for example, track relocation in Braník in 1986, at the Hloubětín depot in 1987 and the Ohrada – Krejcárek section in 1990. On 29 November 2003, a new line between Hlubočepy and Sídliště Barrandov was reopened.

On 4 October 2008, regular operation started on the new section between Laurová and Radlická. Another new section was put into operation on 1 September 2011 when the line from Vítězné Náměstí was extended from the Hotel International to a new loop at the Podbaba stop. The new stops were equipped with a brand new electronic sign system with real time display of arrivals.

In June 2021, tram operation was launched on a quarter-kilometer restored section from the intersection of Na Veselí and Na Pankráci streets to the temporary Pankrác terminus. Most recently, a new section was opened to a new housing development between Barrandov and Holyně. Construction of the first stage began in 2021, its completion and opening took place for passengers on 8 April 2022.

Providing a new shortcut between the two sides of the river, connecting the southern districts of Prague 4 (Nusle, Modřany, Braník), to Smíchov and Anděl, the Dvorecký Bridge over the Vltava opened for tram traffic on 18 April 2026.

In 2026, Prague won the European Tramdriver Championship.

=== Planned network development ===
The renewal of some lines cancelled in the 1970s and 80s and the construction of new lines are being considered. Some of the tracks are already included in the zoning plan, with some being listed in the concept Metropolitan Plan.

In 2019, plans surfaced which included provision for a larger number of tracks. In 2025, the closest projects to implementation are:

- Modřany – Libuš – Nové Dvory 2.8 kilometres (1.7 mi). Connecting Levského terminus with the planned Metro D stations Libuš (stage II) and Nové Dvory (stage I). Construction began in 2022 and the first part of the extension to Libuš opened in 2023. The second part to Nové Dvory is scheduled for completion in 2027.
- Wenceslas Square – Muzeum 0.6 kilometres (0.37 mi). Connection of Wenceslas Square's stop with tracks at Vinohradská and Bělehradská streets. The project of reconstruction of Prague's main station will include a branch from Muzeum to connect to the existing line north of the station, with a new stop in front of the station's rebuilt main concourse. The reconstruction of Hlavní nádraží with the new branch is scheduled for 2028.
- Vinohradské hřbitovy – Malešice 2.2 kilometers (1.37 mi). DPP has received permission to start building a new tram line connecting to Malesice, with construction scheduled to begin in 2025 and commissioning set for 2027. There will be six pairs of stops on the Počernická tram line. The first in the direction from the center are the Hagibor stops, which will be located at the intersection with Názovská and Ramonová Streets, respectively, it will continue until Sídliště Malešice.
- Olšanská – Habrová 2.0 kilometers (1.2 mi). A new tram line will be built over the disused Žižkov Freight Station through the new developments being built there and will terminate at Sídliště Jarov, on the southern end of Osiková Street.
- Malovanka – Strahov 1.3 kilometers (0.8 mi). It will connect to the existing tram network at Bělohorská and Myslbekova Streets. The line will lead from Bělohorská via Vaníčkova Street to the final loop at Stadion Strahov. DPP will build three pairs of stops on it: Malovanka (shared with the existing line to Bílá Hora), Koleje Strahov and Stadion Strahov.

As of 2025, the current lines are in the late-stage planning phases, with construction likely to go ahead:

- Dvorce – Budějovická – Michle 2.6 kilometers (1.6 mi). A new tram line between Dvorce and Budějovická via Jeremenkova street, it will contain a stop with transfer to the future line D of Prague Metro at the Olbrachtova stop (currently Na Strži).
- Podbaba – Troja – Bohnice 5.4 kilometers (3.4 mi). A new tram line connecting the current terminus of Podbaba in Prague 6 to Bohnice in Prague 8 is to be led from the Nádraží Podbaba turning point north along Podbabská Street, on the same route as another planned line, the Nádraží Podbaba – Suchdol. This joint section includes a new stop, the Hydrologický ústav. At the level of the northern promontory of Císařský ostrov, the line to Bohnice will disconnect from the line to Suchdol and, after a new bridge over the Vltava, which should touch the aforementioned promontory, will head to Podhoří. Here, a couple of stops are planned to serve the planned new entrance to Prague Zoo. From Podhoří, the tram line will continue through a tunnel to Bohnice, where it will connect to the street network through a portal in Mazurská Street, and where a couple of stops, Poliklinika Mazurská, will also be created. The tram line will then turn south onto Lodžská Street and then connect to the planned Kobylisy – Bohnice line in K Pazderkám Street.
- Podbaba - Suchdol. The tram line will follow from Podbaba until Hydrologický ústav with the line to Bohnice, afterwards it will diverge North to connect to the Suchdol district and the new developments in Nový Sedlec.

== Routes ==
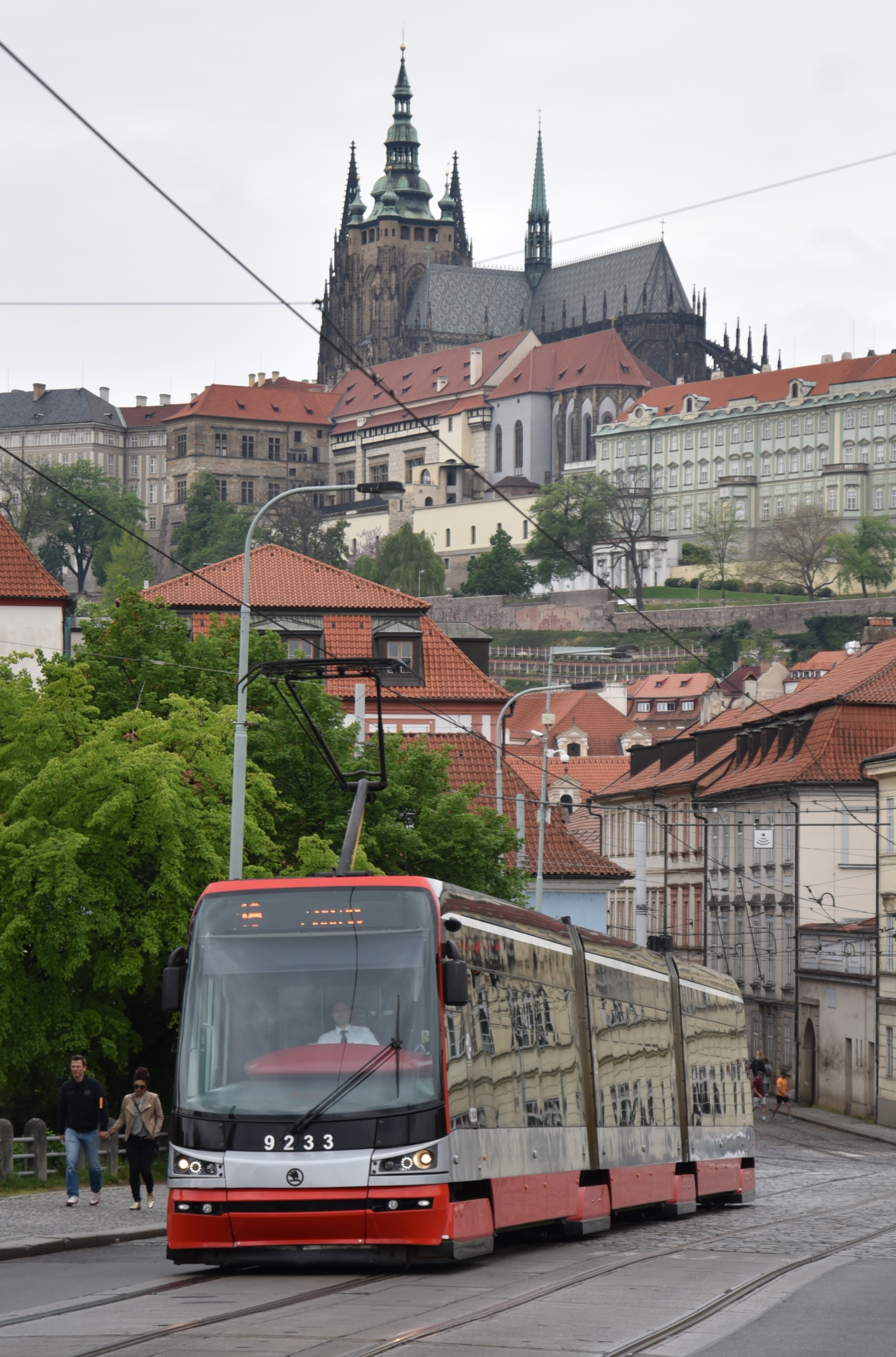
A Škoda 15 T tram crossing Mánes Bridge in 2019

The original horse-drawn lines were designated on maps with colored squares or discs, the other tracks were initially referred to by the name of the track. Line numbering was gradually introduced in 1907 only after the monopolization and electrification of the Prague tram network. The first 10 lines were numbered according to the approximate order in which they were originally introduced: number 1 was a circular Vinohrady-Prague line, and number 10 was initially given to the cable car to Letná. The highest numbering, 12 to 14, was given to lines on the Hlaváček and Křižík railway.

To create a clear distinction between bus and tram lines, the first bus lines in the late 1920s were marked with letters. Since then, tram lines have undergone continuous development without major renumbering; however, today's lines are no longer similar to the original routes.

Day service lines are marked with numbers starting from one, whilst night lines since 1985 have used numbers from 51, and in 2017 night lines were renumbered to numbers from 91 onwards. Nostalgic lines with the operation of historical vehicles used the numbers 91 and 92, and in 2017 line 91 was renumbered to 41. Special lines set up during closures since 1985 usually carry numbers from 31 upwards. Most tram lines on Prague's network run through the city center.

=== Day services ===
Prague tram network runs trams on 27 day routes (numbered 1 to 26 and 31) - route 23 is operated as nostalgic by old unmodernised Tatra T3, T2 and T6 trams which are no longer in use on other lines.

The day lines run from 5:00 AM until midnight. Headways are 8 minutes during peak hours and 10–20 minutes at other times.

Tram	Route	Notes	Source
1	Sídliště Petřiny ↔ Výstaviště		
2	Sídliště Petřiny ↔ Nádraží Braník		
3	Sídliště Modřany (Levského) ↔ Kobylisy (Březiněveská)	(Note: during off-peak hours and on weekends only on section Nádraží Braník – Kobylisy (Březiněveská))	
4	Radlická ↔ Čechovo Náměstí	(Note: operated only on weekdays approx. 6:00–20:00)	
5	Slivenec ↔ Vozovna Žižkov		
6	Kubánské náměstí ↔ Nádraží Holešovice		
7	Kotlářka ↔ Lehovec		
8	Nádraží Podbaba ↔ Starý Hloubětín		
9	Sídliště Řepy ↔ Spojovací		
10	Sídliště Řepy ↔ Sídliště Ďáblice		
11	Spořilov ↔ Spojovací		
12	Sídliště Barrandov ↔ Lehovec		
13	Čechovo Náměstí ↔ Olšanské Hřbitovy	(Note: shortest line)	
15	Sídliště Barrandov ↔ Olšanské hřbitovy		
16	Sídliště Řepy ↔ Ústřední dílny DP		
17	Libuš ↔ Sídliště Modřany (Levského) ↔ Kobylisy ↔ Vozovna Kobylisy	(Note: section Levského – Libuš at half intervals)	
18	Nádraží Podbaba ↔ Vozovna Pankrác		
19	Pankrác ↔ Depo Hostivař		
20	Sídliště Modřany ↔ Dědina		
21	Slivenec ↔ Kubánské Náměstí	(Note: in operation only in morning and afternoon peak hours during working days)	
22	Bílá Hora ↔ Vypich ↔ Zahradní Město ↔ Nádraží Hostivař	(Note: section Vypich – Zahradní Město is operated at half intervals)	
23	Královka ↔ Zvonařka	(Note: nostalgic line)	
24	Spořilov ↔ Vozovna Kobylisy	(Note: operated only on weekdays approx. 6:00–20:00)	
25	Bílá Hora ↔ Výstaviště		
26	Dědina ↔ Nádraží Hostivař	(Note: longest line)	
31	Vysočanská ↔ Spojovací		

=== Night services ===
Night trams operate between midnight and 5:00 AM or 6:00 AM. Their routes are different from the daily ones since in the night the trams have to perform as a substitute for the Metro.

All lines converge at Lazarská in the city centre although other interchanges exist. At Lazarská, passengers can change between all routes within 5 minutes, although individual services only run once every 30 minutes. Trams operating on the night lines start their shifts at about 8:00 PM on normal day lines changing their routes at midnight and returning to their depots at the start of normal operations.

Night traffic was introduced into the network gradually and at times, it was suspended completely. Starting on 21 January 1911, nine lines were extended until midnight with fifteen-minute intervals. However, on 31 July 1914 after the outbreak of World War I, this midnight service was again abolished. From 1 July 1921, service on most lines (12 out of 15) was extended until 1 a.m., with intervals of 10 to 15 minutes, and a special night fare was again in effect after 10:30 PM.

From 9 February 1942, the evening service was shortened to about 23:30. From 30 November 1942, daytime service was shortened to 22:30 and all-night service was introduced on special all-night lines marked A to F and running at 40-minute intervals with a central transfer point at Hybern railway station. Night service was again suspended from 18 January 1945 due to unprofitability.

On 17 December 1945, the night service was reintroduced, and lasted without major changes until 1974. From 3 November 1985, a major reform of night tram operations took place. The night lines (traditionally with an interval of 40 minutes) were renumbered into the special number series 51 to 58 and their routes were modified so that the lines met every 20 minutes at a central transfer point at the intersection of Spálená and Lazarská streets.

On 29 April 2017, all night lines were renumbered (91–99). Night trams in Prague run at 30 minute intervals.

Tram	Line
91	Divoká Šárka ↔ Staré Strašnice (Radošovická)
92	Levského ↔ Lehovec
93	Sídliště Ďáblice ↔ Vozovna Pankrác
94	Sídliště Barrandov ↔ Lehovec
95	Spojovací ↔ Ústřední dílny DP
96	Sídliště Petřiny ↔ Spořilov
97	Bílá Hora ↔ Nádraží Hostivař
98	Sídliště Řepy ↔ Spojovací
99	Sídliště Řepy ↔ Zahradní Město

=== Historical services ===
Prague tram network includes 2 historical routes numbered 41 and 42. PID tickets are not valid on these routes.

Tram	Route
41	Vozovna Střešovice ↔ Výstaviště
42	Dlabačov → Náměstí Republiky → Václavské náměstí → Dlabačov

=== Ticketing ===
Fares are governed by Prague Integrated Transport (PID) system which operates on a proof-of-payment system. Tram tickets can be used for all means of transport in Prague (metro, tramways, city buses, funiculars and ferries). Passengers must buy and validate a ticket immediately after boarding a vehicle, or before entering a metro station's paid area.

Conductors sold tickets on board vehicles until 8 May 1974. Initially, mechanical passenger check-in (MOC) was introduced in trams and buses by means of non-transferable tickets from external and on-board machines in the cars, later replaced by electronic-mechanical markers throughout the public transport network.

Basic single transfer tickets cost 40 CZK (as of 1 August 2021) for a 90-minute ride or 30 CZK for a 30-minute ride. Children up to 15 years and people over age 65 travel for free. People aged from 60 to 65 years travel half-fare. In November 2007, SMS purchase for basic single transfer tickets and day tickets was introduced. In 2018, electronic tickets were introduced using PID Lítačka mobile application. Various types of prepaid season tickets are also available on Prague's public transport. After the previous trial operation on lines 18 and 22, contactless payment card was introduced in all trams on 26 April 2019.

=== Information system ===
All cars (except the historical lines) have electronic displays controlled by the tramcar's on-board computer.

Line numbers are displayed on the front, rear and right side of each car, with the final destination displaying on the front information board. Information boards to the side display an overview of important stops on the route of the line. Until 1980s, announcements were made manually. Line announcements are now automatic and include callouts with nearest metro stops to inform when passengers can switch to the metro.

Stops use red-lit LED displays to show the line and direction of the nearest connections in a given direction and a number indicating the number of minutes until their departure, mounted under the roofing of JCDecaux shelters. Since November 2003, all stops of the new line Hlubočepy – Sídliště Barrandov have been equipped with similar digital information banners. An electronic display showing the number of minutes until departure for stably marked line numbers was installed in mid-2009 at the Nádraží Vysočany stop at the DP headquarters in Vysočany.

In July 2009, the operator announced that by the end of the holidays, a similar display would appear at 271 tram stops, mainly all with an electrical connection from public lighting with wireless data transmission that would be powered by its own battery during the day, but this did not happen. In 2010, the transport company installed an electronically controlled display on the line between Anděl and Sídliště Řepy and at Hradčanská stops. In September 2011, electronic displays arrived on the reconstructed and extended line to Podbaba at three new stops (2× Zelená and at Podbaba on the stop towards the city center).

Audio announcements on trams provide essential stop information in Czech, with the current voice system featuring recordings by actor Jan Vondráček, covering over 2,000 announcements. These announcements include the current stop followed by the next one ("příští zastávka"). Integration with external services like Google Maps provides English-language route guidance using PID data since 2021.

== Infrastructure ==
=== Depots ===
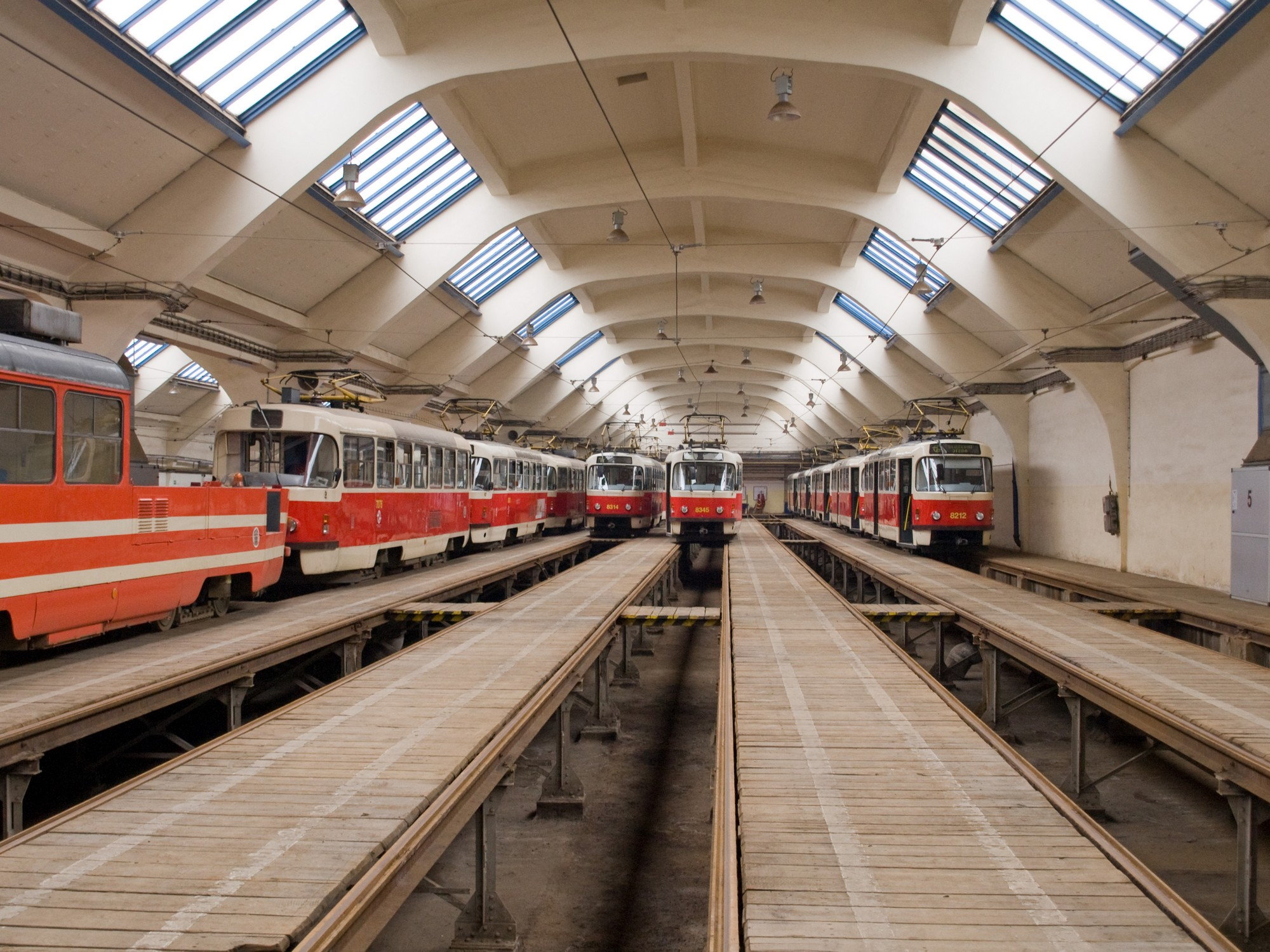
Interior of Pankrác tram depot

In total, at one time Prague trams had 16 depots. Some of those were demolished mostly as a result of the acquisition of T-type cars in the 60s. Others changed their purpose. For example, Vozovna Košíře changed to serve as a trolleybus maintenance depot.

The Prague tram network relies on seven active depots for storage and operations: Kobylisy, Motol, Pankrác, Strašnice, Vokovice, Žižkov and Střešovice.

Hloubětín tram depot was closed in 2019 due to the collapse of the roof structure of the shed. The hall was demolished in the summer of the same year and a new one was opened in March 2025. Střešovice tram depot currently serves only the nostalgic line 23 (operated by Tatra T2 and T3), historic lines 41 and 42, and houses the Prague Public Transport Museum. There is also a Central Workshop located in Hostivař.

=== Lines ===
All lines in Prague are electrified. With the exception of a very short section at Malá Strana, the network is all double-tracks. Parts of some cancelled tracks are still preserved on the surface of the streets, for example on the bridgehead of the Nusle Bridge.

The tracks in the city centre are often run at road level; however, gradually, as part of the preference for public transport in Prague, more sections are appearing in which measures prevents road vehicles from entering the tracks. Tram traffic suffers from delays by cars mainly in the city center, in the Lesser Town and the Old Town. Since the 1990s, new lines outside the city center have been constructed to run as tram lines along a separate railway body, which is crossed with other traffic as far as possible off-level (this applies to new lines to Modřany, through Krejcárek, and for the tram line between Hlubočepy – Sídliště Barrandov).

Pedestrian crossings over tram lines have their own unique issues in Prague. For example, when Barrandov line was put into operation, several "zebra" pedestrian crossings were laid directly across tracks. After the death of the young girl on 17 June 2005 at the crossing at the Poliklinika Barrandov stop where the driver completely neglected the viewing conditions, the relevant tram and city authorities came to the conclusion that road markings were not permissible to use at the crossing of a separate track, and subsequently rebuilt all crossings on the tracks.

=== Power supply ===
The overhead contact lines are supplied by substations. Currently, there are 41 of them. The power supply network is shared with the network for powering trolleybuses, and the new power supply points of electric buses and the trolleybus power supply section are also connected to the contact lines. Substations are mostly remote controlled from the central control room, but there are a few exceptions. The output of all these substations together is more than 200 MW.

The network relies on a direct current (DC) electrical power supply delivered through an overhead catenary system, operating primarily at 600 V with variations up to 660 V in certain segments to accommodate load demands and infrastructure configurations. The positive pole is in the trolleys (pantograph), with the negative pole in the rails.

=== Signalling ===
There is no secure level crossing on the lines of the Prague tram network. Several level crossings at which separate sections of tram lines intersect roads are secured by light signals intended for road traffic. Priority in driving at level crossings is often indicated only by road traffic signs. In several cases, a simple traffic sign is used on the road to determine the priority at the intersection, while on tram tracks, a simple railway signal indicates the priority of tram vehicles at level crossings.

== Rolling stock ==
The Prague public transport company has currently available for standard operations a sizable fleet of 968 trams of varying types, ranging from the classic Tatra T3 cars to the modern Škoda 15 T low-floor trams. These trams are distributed across seven depots across the city. Besides these, the company owns also a fleet of heritage streetcars kept within the transport museum and several trams especially equipped for use for driver training or snowplowing, bringing the total number of vehicles to over 1,000.

=== Tatra T3 and modifications ===
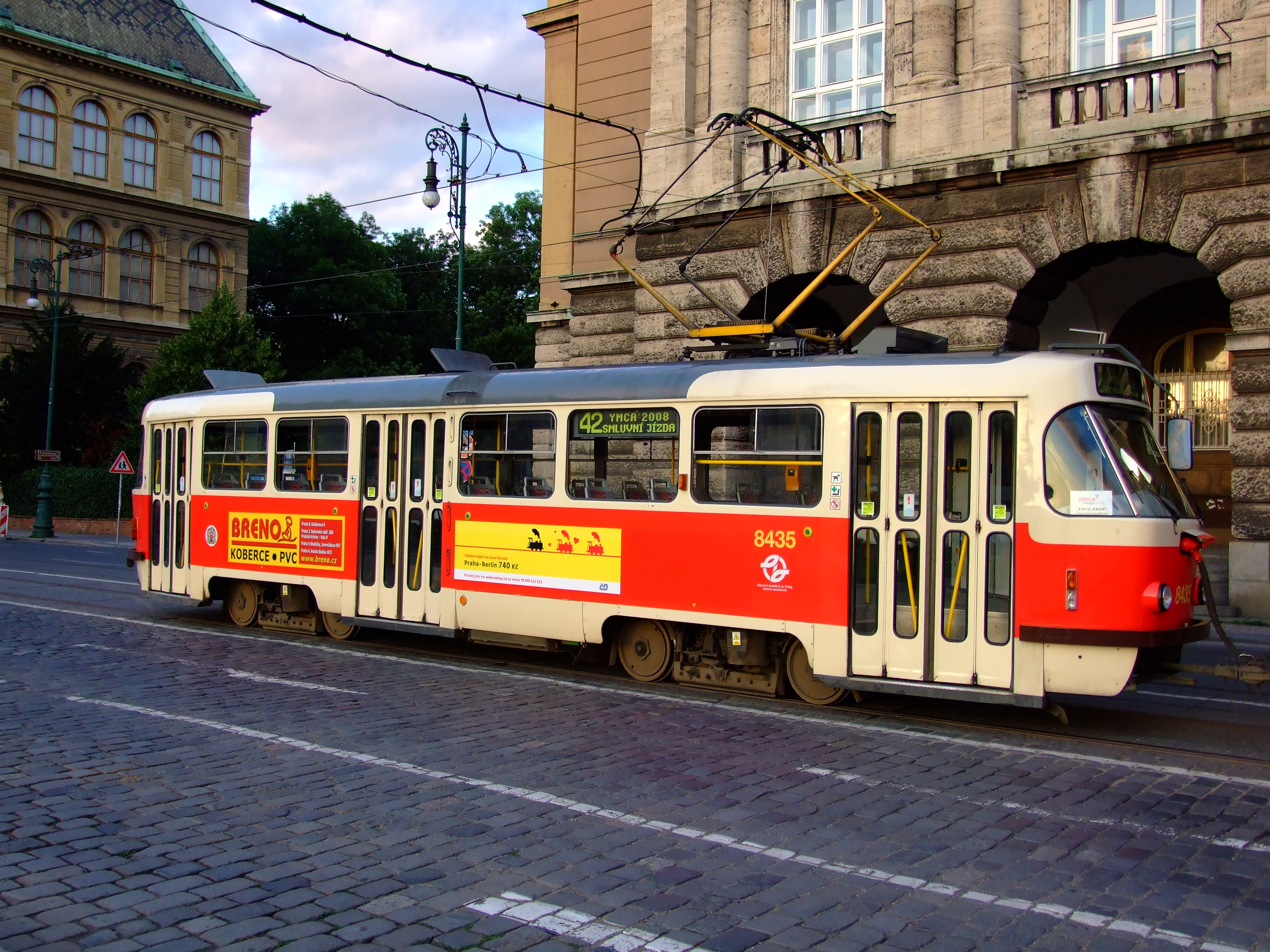
A modernized T3

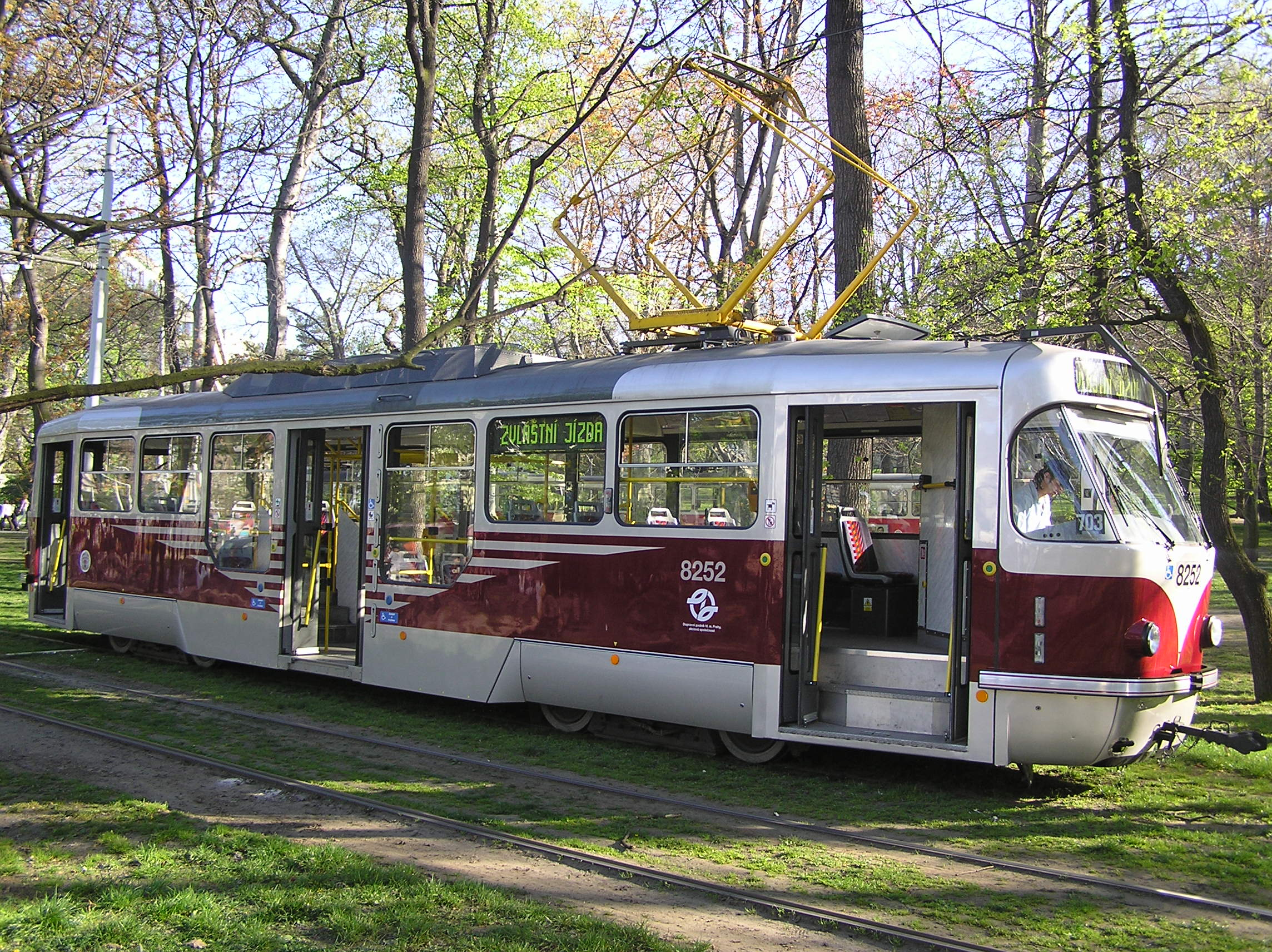
A low-floor T3

The various modifications of the Tatra T3 tram cars, which are common all over the former Eastern Bloc form the bulk of the fleet, since they were produced in Prague in large numbers for both domestic use and export. More than half of the classic streetcars have undergone modernization during the first ten years of the 21st century, which equipped them with new motors and electrical equipment, new audiovisual information system for the passengers and refurbished interiors. The renovated trams were named Tatra T3R.P, where R stands for Renovated and P for the used electrical equipment. Both the original design and the modernizations have proved so successful that the transport company has decided to produce newly built trams according to the original design, but with a low-floor section in the middle.

=== Newer trams ===
In the 1980s, rolling stock was swapped to higher-capacity tram vehicles. The result was the bidirectional Tatra KT8D5 articulated tramcar, of which 49 were delivered. All of these were modernized and equipped with a low-floor section. After the Velvet Revolution, the company decided not to continue with the deliveries and instead ordered delivery of 150 standard-length Tatra T6A5 cars. Shortly after these deliveries ended, the traditional producer of trams for Prague, ČKD Tatra, went bankrupt, stopping new tram deliveries for several years.

After strong demands both from the handicapped community and from the general public, the Prague transport company decided to order new low-floor trams from Škoda Transportation. 60 Škoda 14 T trams, designed by Porsche, were delivered between 2005 and 2009. They were followed by 250 of a more modern 100% low-floor Škoda 15 T since 2010.

On 16 November 2022, the Prague Public Transit Company announced a public tender for the supply of new trams, to which Škoda Transportation won. The contract was formally signed on 27 December 2023 for an initial order of 40 ForCity Plus 52T trams with an option for 160 more. The initial order of 40 trams will be delivered in 2025 and 2026, with first 52T trams launching in May 2025.

=== Current rolling stock ===
The table below does not include trams used for the retro line 23 (mostly older variants of Tatra T3 and a few Tatra T2 and Tatra T6).

Image	Tram Car Type	Modifications and subtypes	Bidirectional?	Fleet numbers	Depot Allocations	In service
	Tatra T3	Tatra T3M; Tatra T3SU; Tatra T3R.P; Tatra T3R.PV; Tatra T3R.PLF	No	T3 67xx–69xx (withdrawn); T3SU 7001–7020; T3SUCS 7021–7292; T3M 8005–8106; T3RP 8211–8245, 8300–8554, T3R.PV 8151–8181; T3R.PLF 8251–8299, 8751-8772	Hloubětín, Pankrác, Strašnice, Kobylisy, Vokovice, Žižkov	426
	Tatra KT8D5	Tatra KT8D5R.N2P	Yes	9001–9048 original numbers When a tram gets modernised, 50 is added to its number. So modernised trams are in the series 9051–9097. 9006 withdrawn after damage.	Hloubětín	52
	Škoda 14 T	Škoda 14 T	No	9111–9170	Kobylisy	59
	Škoda 15 T	Škoda 15 T Škoda 15 T4, (15 T Alfa)	No	9201–9325; 9326–9450	Pankrác, Vokovice, Motol, Žižkov	250
	Škoda 52 T	Škoda 52 T	No	9501–9540	Hloubětín	20(40) first batch

== Transport museum ==
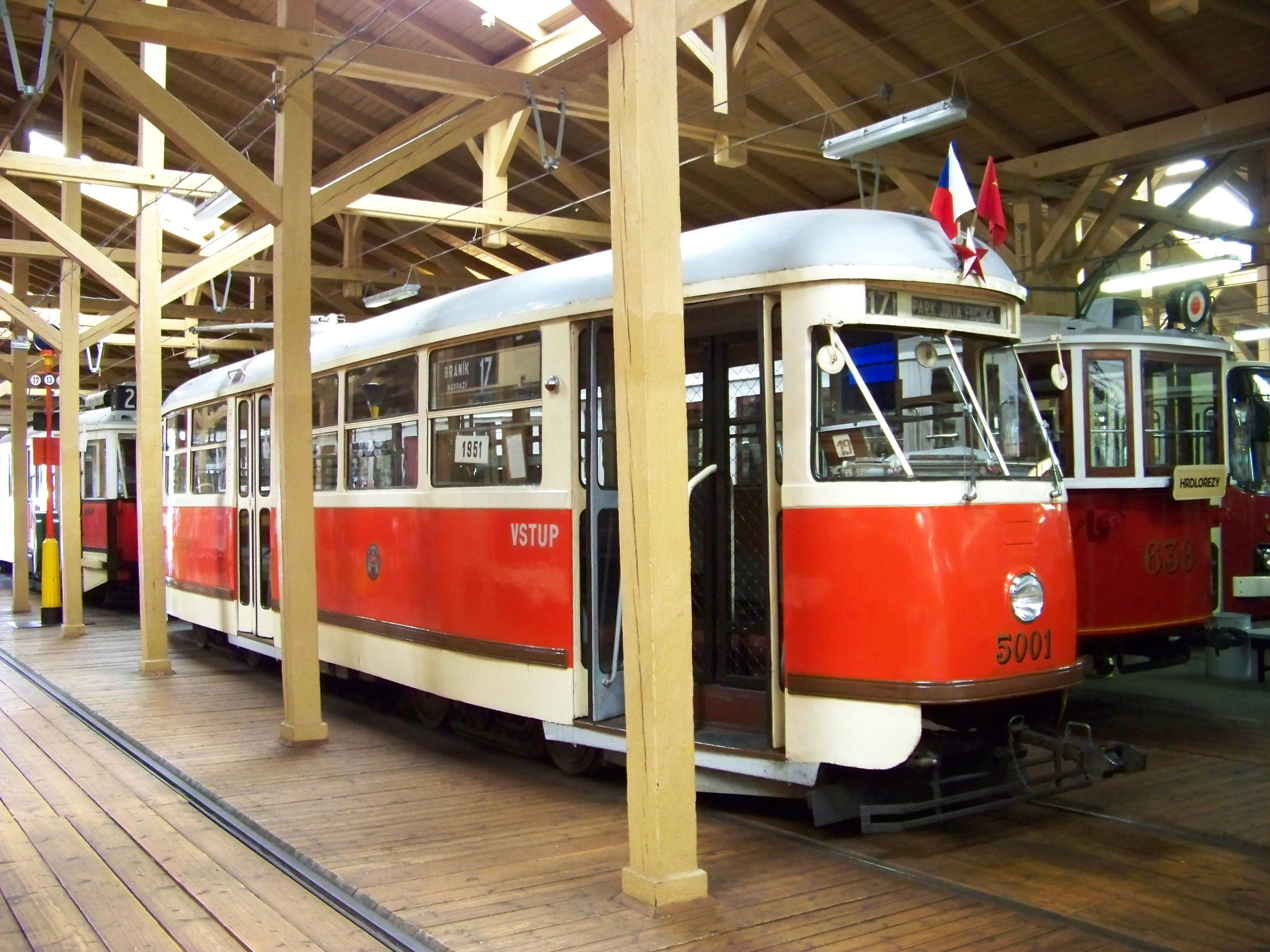
Historical Tatra T1 at Prague Transport Museum

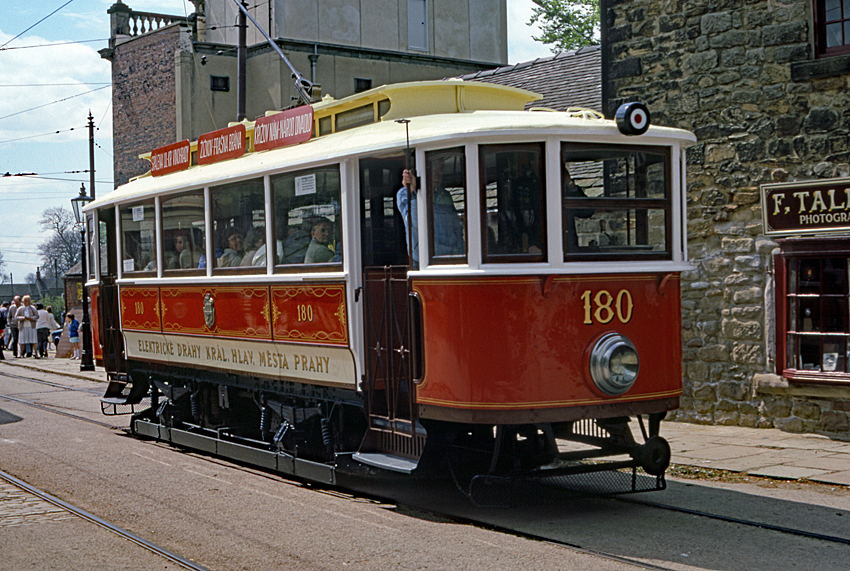
Preserved 1905 Tatra tram 180 in Crich, UK

In 1992, a centre was established in Střešovice tram depot. Since then, historical trains for sightseeing tours of Prague are all dispatched from there. On 14 May 1993, part of the depot was rebuilt into the Museum of Public Transport. Historical buses and trolleybuses are also located there, and the museum is accessible to the general public. In 2019, the buses were taken away from the Museum premises. Buses are now located in the depository outside the depot, whilst their separate exhibition is planned.

=== Historic lines and rolling stock ===
In 1991, the General Czechoslovak Exhibition was held at the Prague Exhibition Grounds, which followed a similar event that took place at the same place a hundred years ago (in 1891). In addition, 1991 coincided with the centenary of the start of electric tram operations in Prague. To commemorate this anniversary, planners considered reconstructing the old Křižík tram together with a replica of the original first electric car. However, this never happened because the organizers of the exhibition, who planned the construction of the restored track, had no idea where the original track led.

To commemorate the anniversary, a variant was chosen where Prague was served by a special tram line operated by old cars, which the Public Transport Company still had at its disposal at that time. At a meeting at the Transport Company on 11 February 1991, the idea was approved, the line number – 91 was chosen to refer to the years of the exhibitions 1891 and 1991 (in May 2017 the line was renumbered to 41), and at the same time the pairs of cars that would run on the line were also selected. Their fleet numbers were 2210 with trailer 1202 and 2110 with trailer 1522. These selected cars had to be rebuilt and had to undergo type approval according to the conditions for transport of the Ministry of the Interior. Renovations were carried out in the depots of Strašnice and Pankrác.

In 1992, line number 92 was also in operation on the route Malostranské náměstí – Dlabačov. Because the line wasn't popular, it was soon closed. Another line – 42, on a shorter route in Dlabačov is still in operation.
