= Strašnice tram depot =

- Vozovna Strašnice
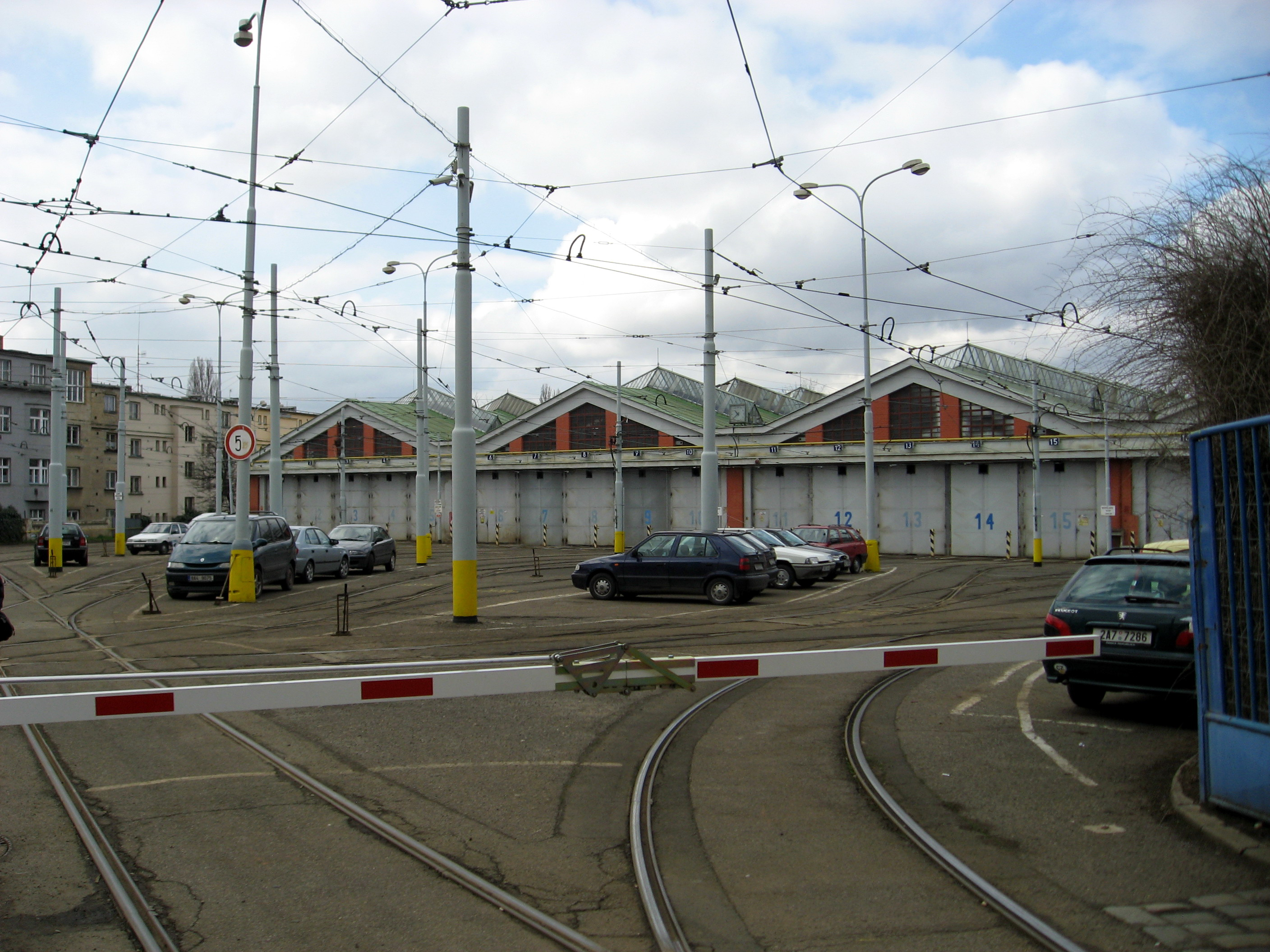
- the depot in 2009
- Interactive map of the Strašnice tram depot area

General information
- Location: Prague 10, Czech Republic
- Coordinates: 50°4′33″N 14°29′15″E

Strašnice tram depot (Czech: Vozovna Strašnice) is a tram and trolleybus depot in Strašnice that has been part of the Prague tram network since 1908. The depot was the biggest along with Žižkov tram depot. It was completely reconstructed in the 1920s and 1930s.
