= Škoda 15 T =

Czech tram

Škoda 15T ForCity uni-directional, bi-directional
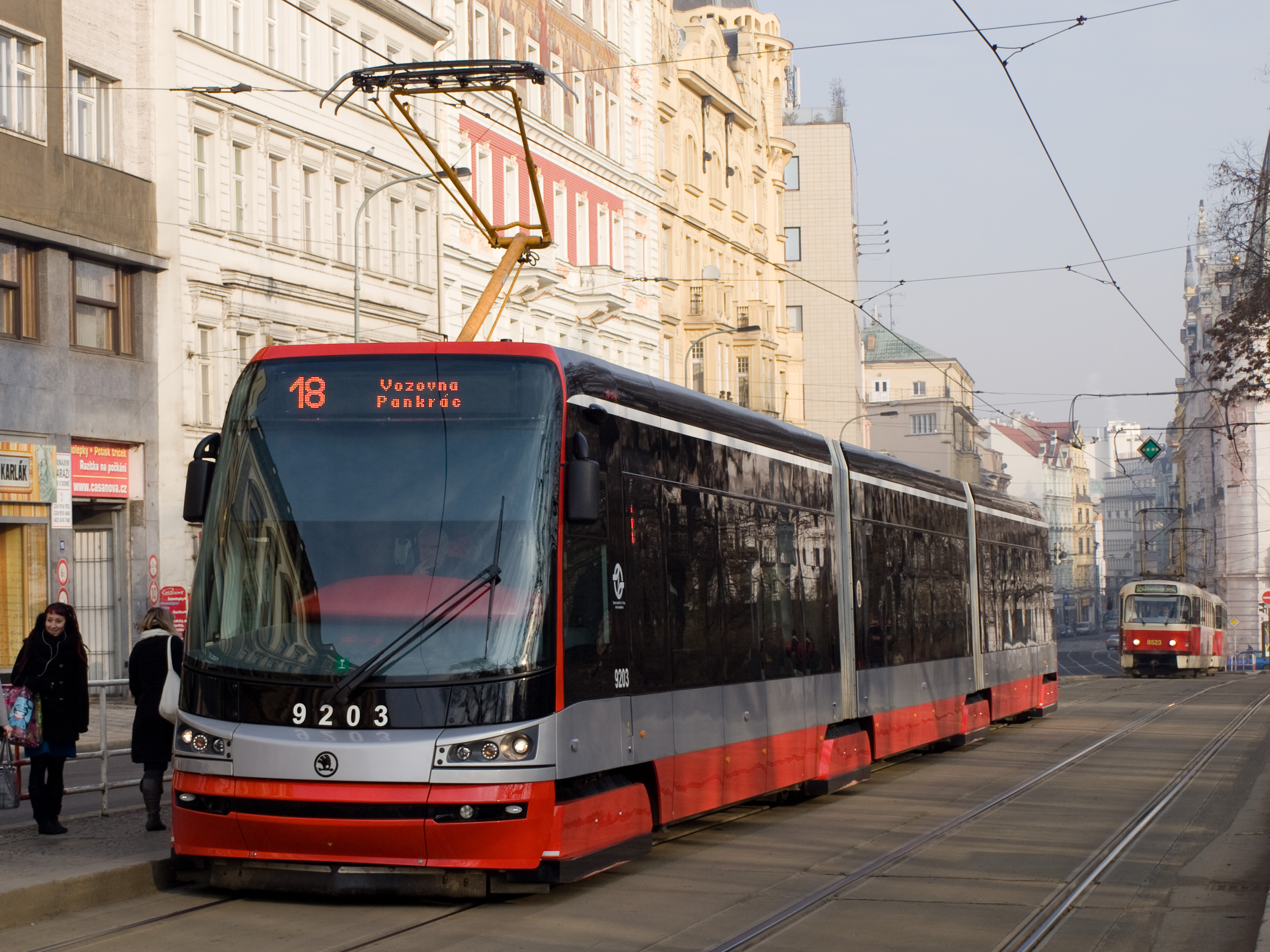
- Manufacturer: Škoda Transportation
- Designers: Miloš Zelingr, Patrik Kotas
- Assembly: Plzeň, Czech Republic
- Family name: Škoda ForCity
- Constructed: 2009–present
- Predecessor: Škoda 14 T Elektra
- Capacity: 43–72 seated, 150–539 standing

Specifications
- Train length: 21.8–50.6 m (71 ft 6 in – 166 ft 0 in)
- Width: 2.3–2.65 m (7 ft 7 in – 8 ft 8 in)
- Height: 3.6 m (12 ft)
- Floor height: 350 mm (13.78 in)/450 mm (17.72 in)
- Low-floor: 100%
- Doors: 4–10
- Articulated sections: 1–5
- Maximum speed: 80 km/h (50 mph) (design)
- Axle load: 5.2 t (5.1 long tons; 5.7 short tons)
- Steep gradient: 85 ‰ (8.5%)
- Traction motors: 46.6 kW (62.5 hp) permanent-magnet synchronous motor
- Wheels driven: 60% – 100%
- Bogies: pivoting and pivoting Jacobs (25°)
- Minimum turning radius: 18 m (59 ft)/15 m (49 ft)
- Track gauge: 950 mm (3 ft 1 3/8 in) - 1,524 mm (5 ft)

Škoda 15T (also known as Škoda ForCity Alfa) is a 100% low-floor multiple-unit tram developed by VUKV a.s. and built by Škoda Transportation in Plzeň for the Prague tram network. It was a successor to the Škoda 14T, featuring articulated bogies and more power to correct for problems found during the operation of the 14 T. The 15T has articulated bogies at either end of the train, and Jacobs bogies between the segments. The tram has two double-doors in each segment (or four in bi-directional version) to allow fast boarding of passengers, and one extra side door leading to the driver's cabin.

== Design ==
The Škoda 15T ForCity was developed as highly modular; it is offered with up to five car body sections and 50.6 meters (166 ft 0 in) in length. It may be used on gauges from 950 mm (3 ft 1 3/8 in) up to 1,524 mm (5 ft) and the body may be 2,300–2,650 mm (7 ft 7 in – 8 ft 8 in) wide. The tram can be uni-directional or bi-directional. It can have from 60% of wheels driven up to all of the wheels driven for networks in hilly cities. As the bogies are under articulations and don't interfere with the inner space of the body sections, there is unlimited choice of interior lay-out and location of doors.

The basic vehicle length can be modified. It is also possible to couple two or more vehicles. The tram's appearance and front design are user-defined.

Newer model trams may be up to 72 metres (236 ft 3 in) long and carry 539 passengers at a comfortable 4 passengers/m^{2}.

=== Bogies ===
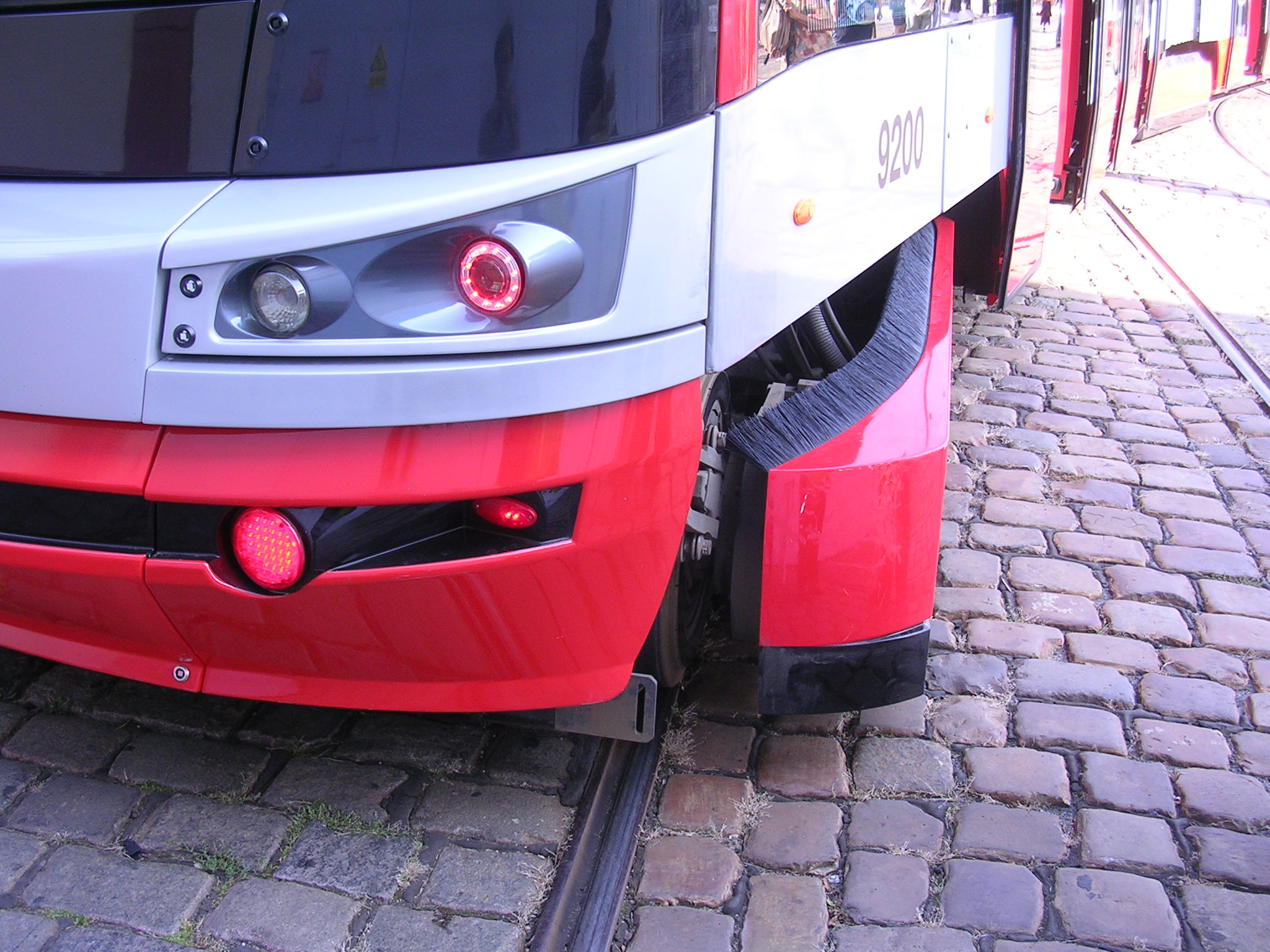
Detail of pivoting bogie

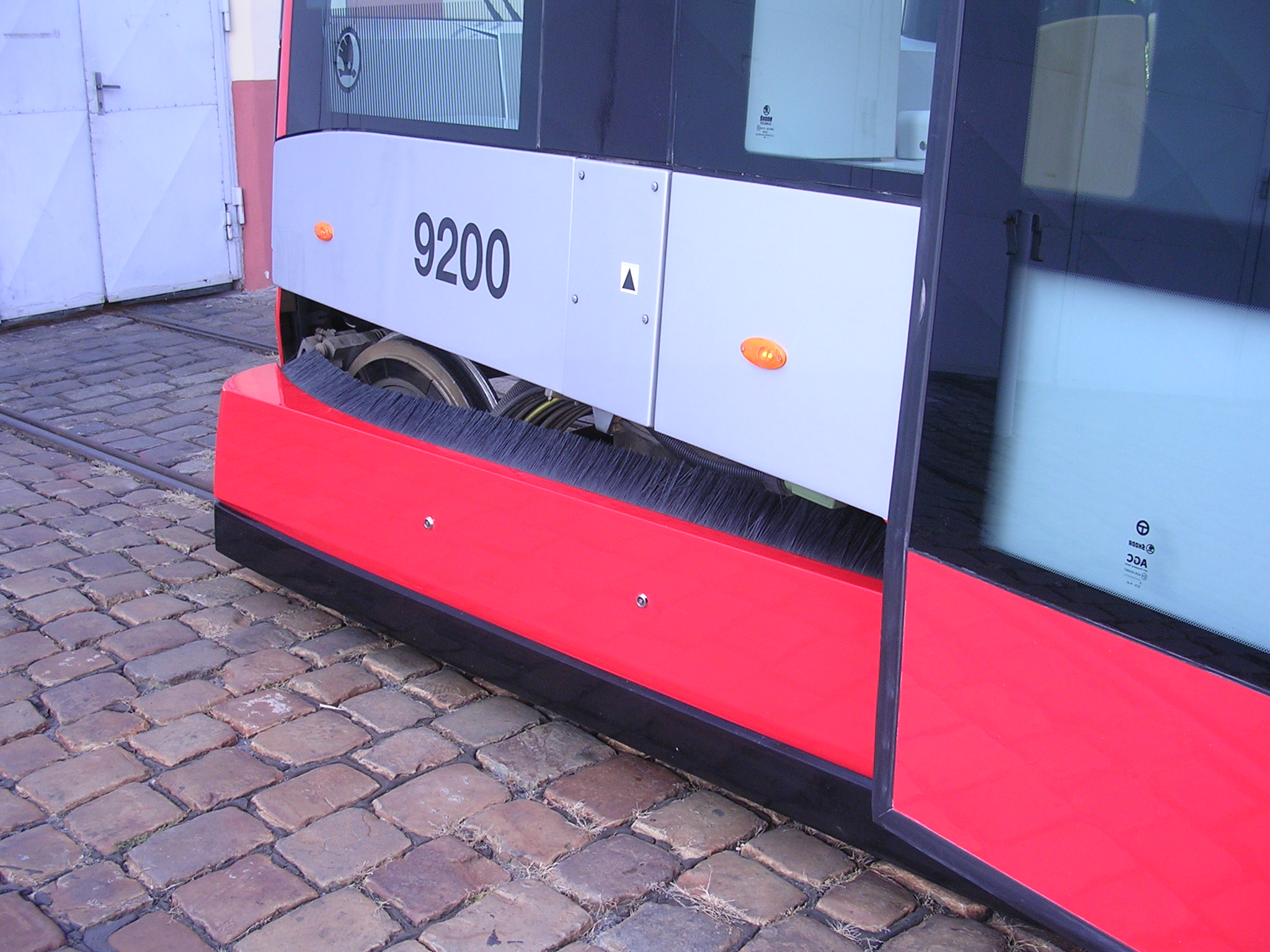
Detail of pivoting bogie

The fixed bogies which are used by most 100% low floor trams for this time increase track wear and decrease the speed at which a tram can drive through a curve (usually 4–15 km/h (2.5–9.3 mph) on a 20 m (65 ft 7 in) radius curve). The 15T is designed to cope with these drawbacks by using Jacobs bogies under the articulations, and pivoting bogies at the ends of the tram.

For a time the 15T was said to be the only 100% low floor tram in production with full-pivoting bogies. However, the Alstom Citadis X04, an experimental 100% low floor tram currently being developed with pivoting bogies (but with sections of high floor seating over the bogies), has made an initial production appearance in Istanbul as a modified Citadis 301 (with a fixed centre bogie), and as of 2015, a tram with a similar interior arrangement, and all pivoting bogies, is undergoing trials for Helsinki. With the same length of tramcar, the Škoda 15T also has four bogies, compared to three (fixed) bogies (the same as on most 100% low floor trams) on its predecessor, the Škoda 14 T, which decreases the load each wheel puts on the track. Most of the tram floor is 350 mm (13.78 in) above the rails, but the height over the bogies is 450 mm (17.72 in) above the rails. The transition is inclined, without interior steps. The corridor above the central bogies is 700 mm (27.56 in) wide.

The bogies can all be driven, or some may be idle, depending on the customer's preferences. The bogies have two axles and two-level springing. The mounted wheels are rubber-sprung, with integrated brake-discs and axle bearings. On the axle bearings there is a combined, dynamically resistant, primary rubber-bonded-metal-sprung bogie framework. This framework supports four traction motors and one (in outer bogies) or two (in inner bogies) sprung swing bolsters. The secondary springing of the swing bolsters is secured by steel coil springs with parallel hydraulic rotating dampers. The swing bolsters have pivot bearings, which facilitate full rotation of the bogie below the body without any limitations.

=== Wheels and motors ===
Škoda 15T ForCity (Prague, Czechia) uni-directional
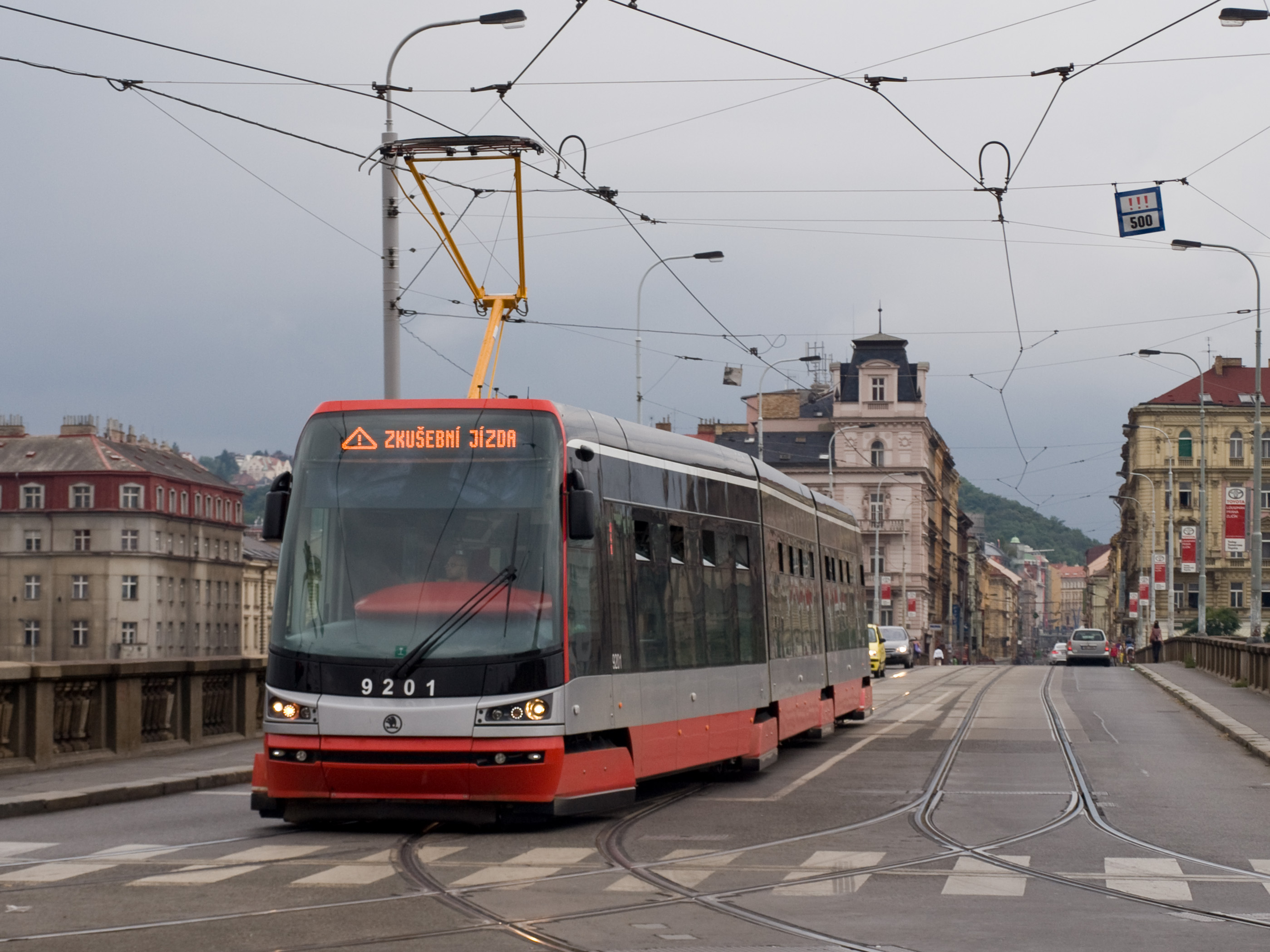
- Manufacturer: Škoda Transportation
- Assembly: Plzeň, Czech Republic
- Constructed: 2009–present
- Number built: (250 ordered)
- Capacity: 61 seated, 239 standing

Specifications
- Train length: 31.4 m (103 ft 0 in)
- Width: 2.46 m (8 ft 1 in)
- Height: 3.6 m (12 ft)
- Floor height: 350 mm (13.78 in)/450 mm (17.72 in)
- Low-floor: 100%
- Doors: 6
- Articulated sections: 2 (3 body sections)
- Maximum speed: 60 km/h (37 mph) (service)
- Weight: 42 t (41 long tons; 46 short tons)
- Steep gradient: 85 ‰ (8.5%)
- Traction motors: 16 × 46.6 kW (62.5 hp)
- Power output: 745.6 kW (999.9 hp)
- UIC classification: Bo'Bo'Bo'Bo'
- Wheels driven: 100% (16/16)
- Bogies: 4 × pivoting and pivoting Jacobs (25°)
- Minimum turning radius: 18 m (59 ft)/15 m (49 ft)
- Track gauge: 1,435 mm (4 ft 8 1/2 in) standard gauge

Škoda 15T ForCity (Riga, Latvia) uni-directional
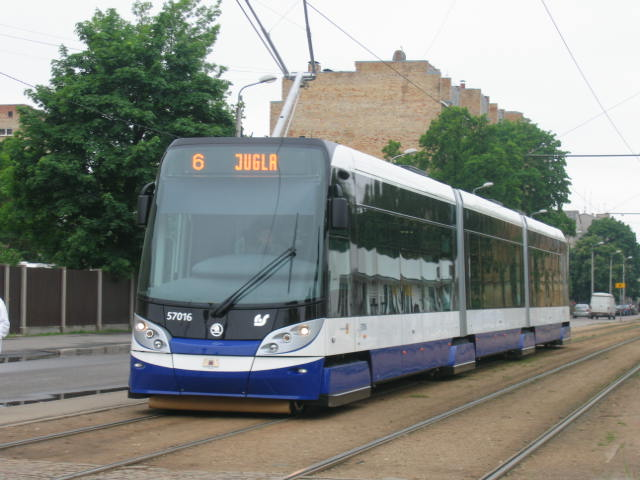
- Manufacturer: Škoda Transportation
- Assembly: Plzeň, Czech Republic
- Constructed: 2009–present
- Number built: 20 (31.6 m); 6 (41.2 m)
- Capacity: 60 seated, 260 standing

Specifications
- Train length: 31.6 m (103 ft 8 in); 41.2 m (135 ft 2 in)
- Width: 2.5 m (8 ft 2 in)
- Height: 3.6 m (12 ft)
- Floor height: 350 mm (13.78 in)/450 mm (17.72 in)
- Low-floor: 100%
- Doors: 2 per body section
- Articulated sections: 2 (3 body sections); 3 (4 body sections)
- Maximum speed: 70 km/h (43 mph) (service)
- Weight: 42 t (41 long tons; 46 short tons)
- Traction motors: 12 × 46.6 kW (62.5 hp)
- Power output: 559.2 kW (749.9 hp)
- UIC classification: 2'Bo'Bo'Bo' (3 body sections); 2'Bo'Bo'Bo'Bo' (4 body sections)
- Wheels driven: 75% (12/16)
- Bogies: pivoting and pivoting Jacobs (25°)
- Minimum turning radius: 18 m (59 ft)/15 m (49 ft)
- Track gauge: 1,524 mm (5 ft)

All bogies are equipped with identical wheels, which have tyres damping rubber pads to minimize noise. Selected bogies could be equipped with a sanding system.

The vehicle is driven by traction units. Each unit consists of traction container on the vehicle roof and of four traction motors, which drive wheels of one driving bogie. Individual wheel drive on respective bogies secures perfect use of adhesive conditions and ideal ride both in bends and on straight lines. There are 3-phase synchronous motors with permanent magnet excitation on rotor. They are fixed to the bogie framework from the wheels outside. The traction motors don't use a gear box - they drive tram wheels directly through a mechanically disconnectable jaw clutch.

While the drive is controlled by two control units connected together by fast serial communication, the safety circuits and functions are hardware-resolved.

=== Brakes ===
Braking is mainly done by electrodynamic brake enabling recuperation of the braking energy back to the electrical grid. If there is no need of it, the braking energy is being used primarily for feeding the vehicle's auxiliary equipment with the rest depleted in the brake resistors. The electrodynamic brake is able to automatically run even during grid's voltage failure. In case of failure, braking is automatically done by the system of friction disc brake, which will work until the vehicle comes to a complete halt. The friction disc brake is hydraulically controlled with an electric compression unit. Each bogie is also equipped with a pair of electromagnetic rail brakes with voltage of 24 V DC. The friction disc brake also ensures the parking brake function.

=== Doors ===
The vehicle has two double doors on each body unit (or four of them on bi-directional version), or alternatively there can be one door each side on each body unit located in place of any of the side panels. The driver has a separate door leading to the driver's cabin. The doors slide outwards. Each door is equipped with an individual control unit, which operates it and communicates with the vehicle central control unit. In selected double-doors area there could be either ramp or lift enabling easy entry for passengers with restricted mobility. There could be also a room for bicycles and prams.

== Production ==
=== Prague ===
Škoda ForCity won the bidding process of the Prague transport company for 250 new trams in 2005. The order is worth 17 billion CZK (about 68 million CZK per unit (2,3 million € per unit - 1€ 2005=29,6CZK)).

The trials of the first prototype started in 2009, the first rides with passengers started in October 2010 and the last tramcar was delivered in 2017. The prototype had 3 types of seats - wooden, plastic and with fabric upholstery. Passengers have decided in an internet poll that the wooden seats will be used in the delivered version.

During the delivery of the first batch in 2011, the Prague transport company started negotiations with Škoda regarding the installation of air conditioning in the passenger compartment. It also raised the concern that a 1,000-horsepower streetcar may be unnecessarily powerful and proposed a solution used in the Riga version, which has only three out of four bogies driven. In the view of the transport company the price of additional air conditioning should be covered by eliminating the first bogie's motors. As of May, 2011, it was not yet decided whether this solution will be applied. Firstly there is issue that participants in the original tender may contest the change and require a new competition; secondly it has to be tested whether the 15T without full adhesion would be able to drive on Prague's hilly network.

In May 2014, due to financial problems for the City of Prague, the Prague transport company and Škoda Transportation renegotiated the contract to provide for four extra years for delivery of the order and for fitting of full air-conditioning and WiFi in the last 125 trams of the order. By June, 2014, the first 100 trams of the order had been delivered and the first of the modified trams (from the second half of the order) will be delivered in 2015.

=== Riga ===
In May 2008 Škoda made a contract with the Riga transport company (Latvia) for delivery of 20 trams (with option for another 32) worth 1.3 billion CZK (about 65 million CZK per unit (2.6 million € per unit – 1€ 2008 = 25CZK)). The bidding process started in 2007 and altogether 9 companies took part in it. The Riga variant is three-segmented, like the Prague version, with air-conditioning for whole tram (Prague only for driver's cabin) and it is in white-blue livery. Unlike Prague's version, which has all bogies driven due to difficult adhesive conditions (Prague has hilly terrain), the Riga tram has 3 bogies driven (the 1st bogie doesn't have motors). The tram has upholstered seats similar to those in Škoda trolleybuses used in Riga.

The first tram was delivered to Riga in March, 2010, the second in August 2010 and the other 18 were delivered before the end of 2011. The first rides with passengers were in June, 2010 after preceding test-drives.

There are also 6 four-segmented tramcars (41 m (134 ft 6 in) long) made for Riga, Latvia, as the town decided to apply a part of the pre-agreed option of 32 (which was part of the previous order for 20). These were delivered between June and October 2012.

In April 2016 Riga Transport (RS) awarded Škoda Transportation a €62.6m contract to supply 20 more, 15T ForCity low-floor trams. The order comprises 15 three-section vehicles and five four-section LRVs. All 20 vehicles are due to be delivered next year. The 1,524 mm (5 ft)-gauge 600 V DC vehicles will be used on Line 1, which links Riga neighborhood Jugla with Imanta, in fact this line is combined 4th and 6th lines.

=== Other tenders ===
Several unsuccessful tenders have been made by Škoda for the ForCity tram in other cities.

- At the end of September, 2010, Škoda entered into a bidding process by the city of Rostock in Germany for new trams for the local network. Škoda did not win this tender, which was instead awarded to Vossloh.
- The 15T was also submitted in a proposal for the Helsinki tram network serving Helsinki, Finland, but lost the tender to the Artic tram produced by Transtech Oy (Škoda purchased Transtech in 2015 and the product has since been rebranded as ForCity Smart).
- Škoda also entered a tender for the tram network in Zürich, Switzerland, but later withdrew their bid.
- In April, 2011, Škoda announced it would start a lawsuit against the transport authority of Essen in Germany, which announced a selection procedure for delivery of new trams for its urban network. Škoda believed the procedure's technical requirements to be so specific that they effectively reduced competition (contrary to European law), leaving Škoda not able to offer its bid, which was ultimately won by Bombardier.

A Škoda 15T from Prague underwent testing and certification on the tram network in the German city of Chemnitz in 2012. Subsequently, an order was placed for ForCity Classic trams in 2016.

=== China ===
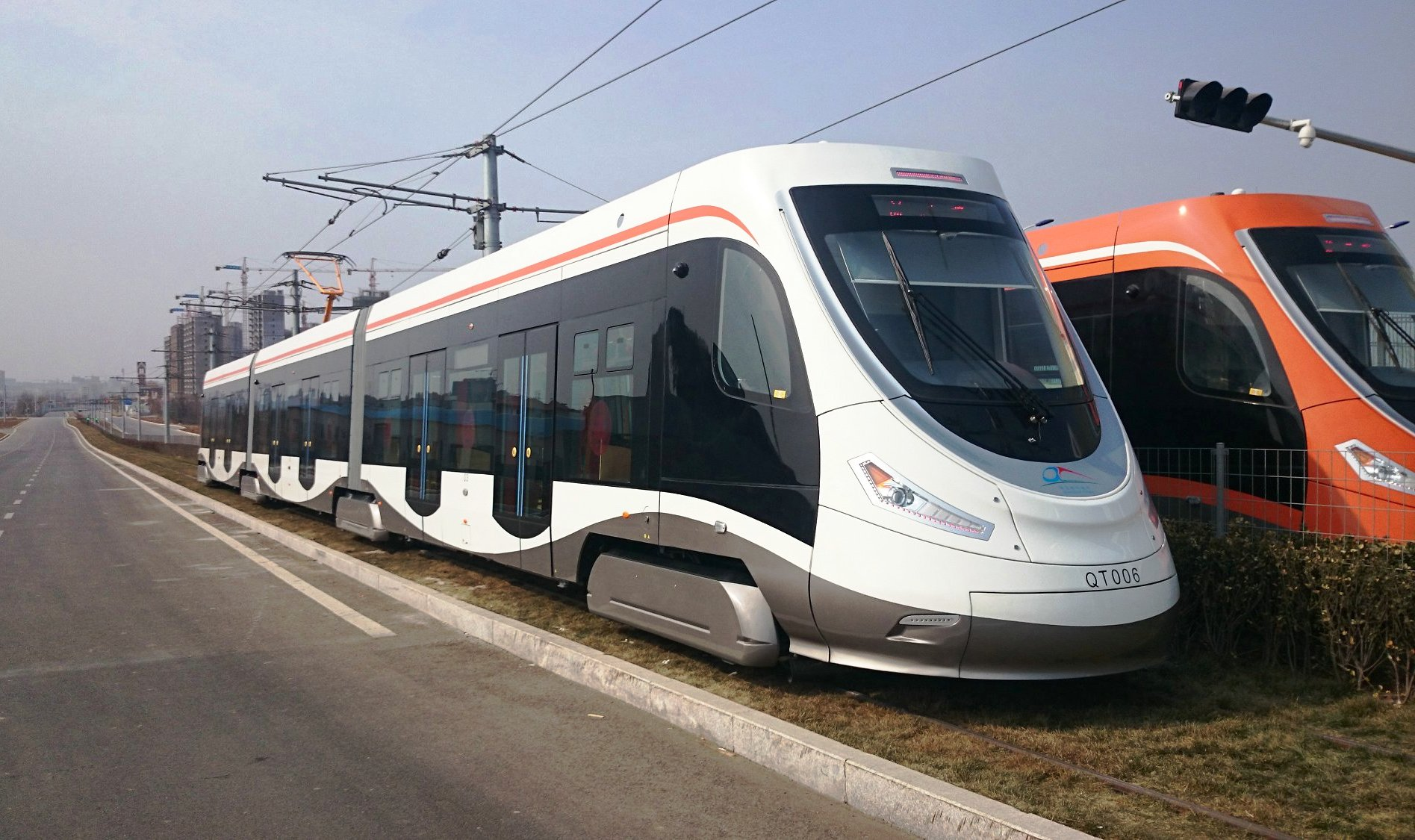
27Ts in Qingdao

In 2013 Škoda has signed an agreement with Chinese CSR Sifang to produce Škoda 15Ts for the Chinese market under licence. The 10-year agreement could cover up to 400 trams. The first unidirectional prototype was produced in 2014.

In 2015 CSR Sifang unveiled new bi-directional tram based on 15T designated as 27T. This vehicle is 2,650 mm (8 ft 8 in) wide and is bidirectional. Apart from the traditional overhead line vehicle can be powered by battery, Supercapacitor or hydrogen-fuelled.

In March 2016 first line of Qingdao Tram was inaugurated, served by fleet of seven CSR Sifang produced 27T trams. The trams are 32.5 m (106 ft 8 in) long and using hydrogen fuel cells to allow service at the parts of the route without overhead electrification. Subsequently, another system operated by these trams has been opened in Foshan. In May 2019 the first tram of Delingha Tram was unveiled. The trams are two sections long and use supercapacitor and lithium-titanate battery energy storage to allow service at the parts of the route without overhead electrification.

== Gallery ==
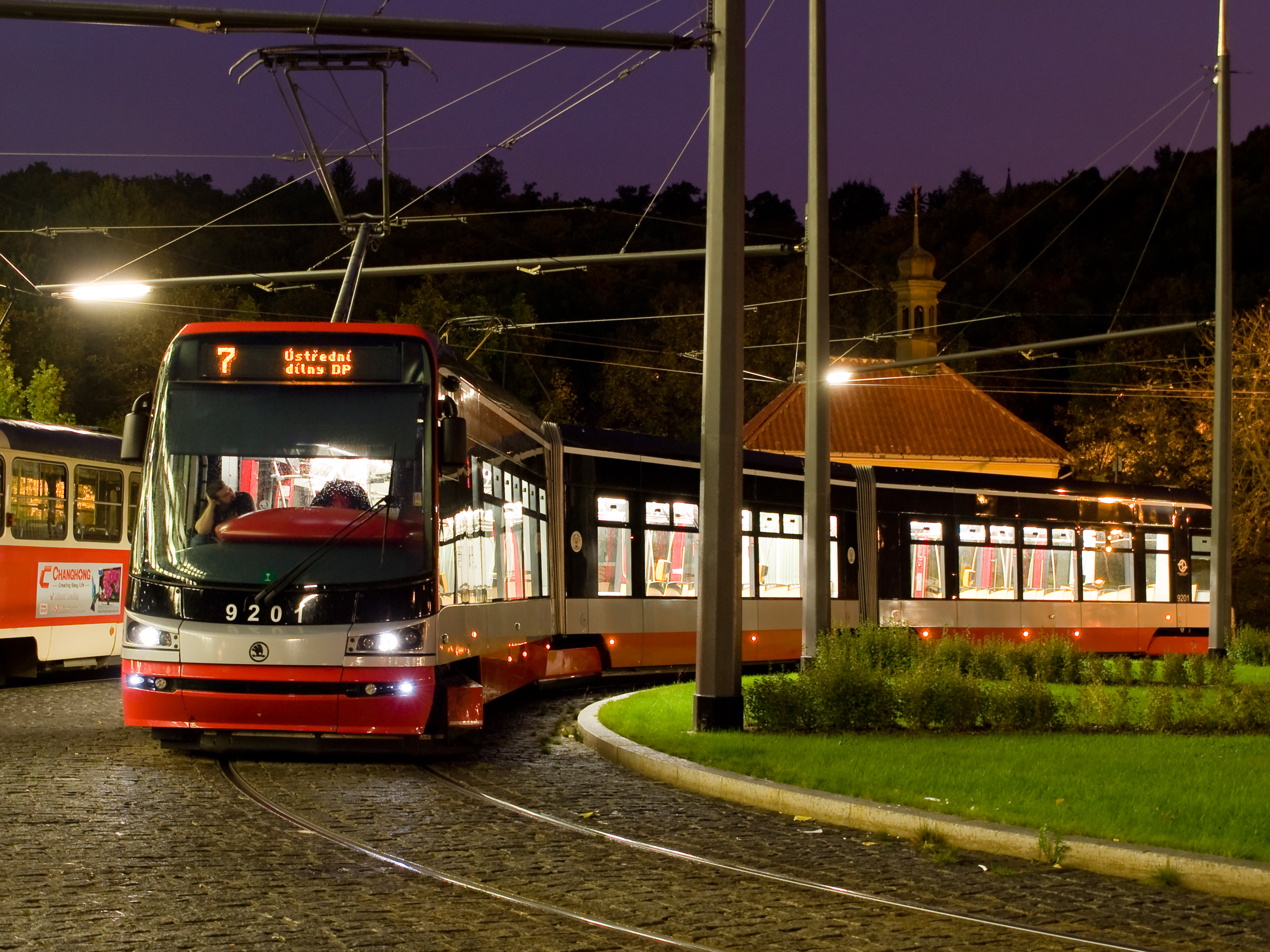
15T in Prague

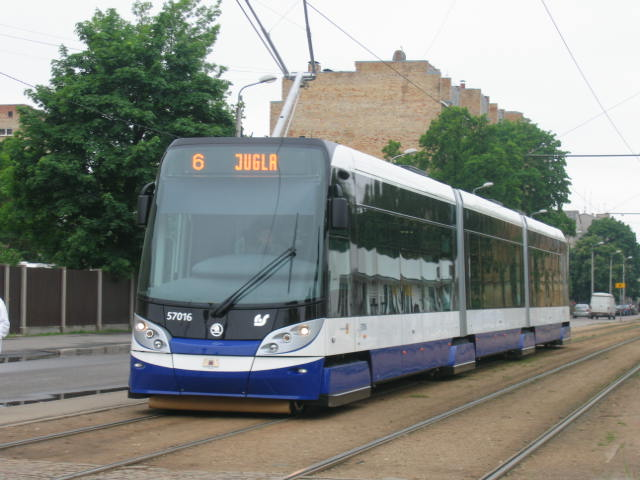
15T in Riga

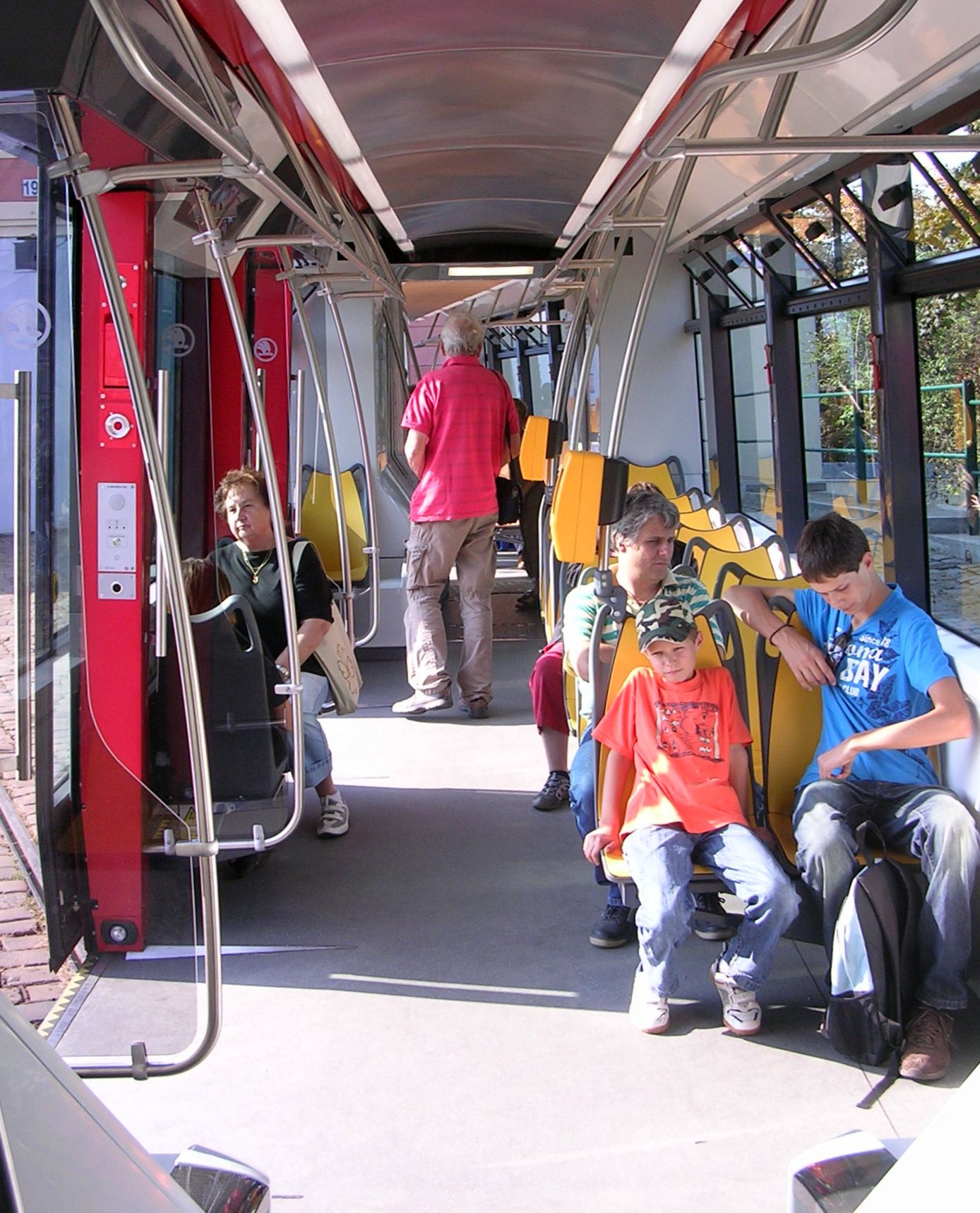
Interior

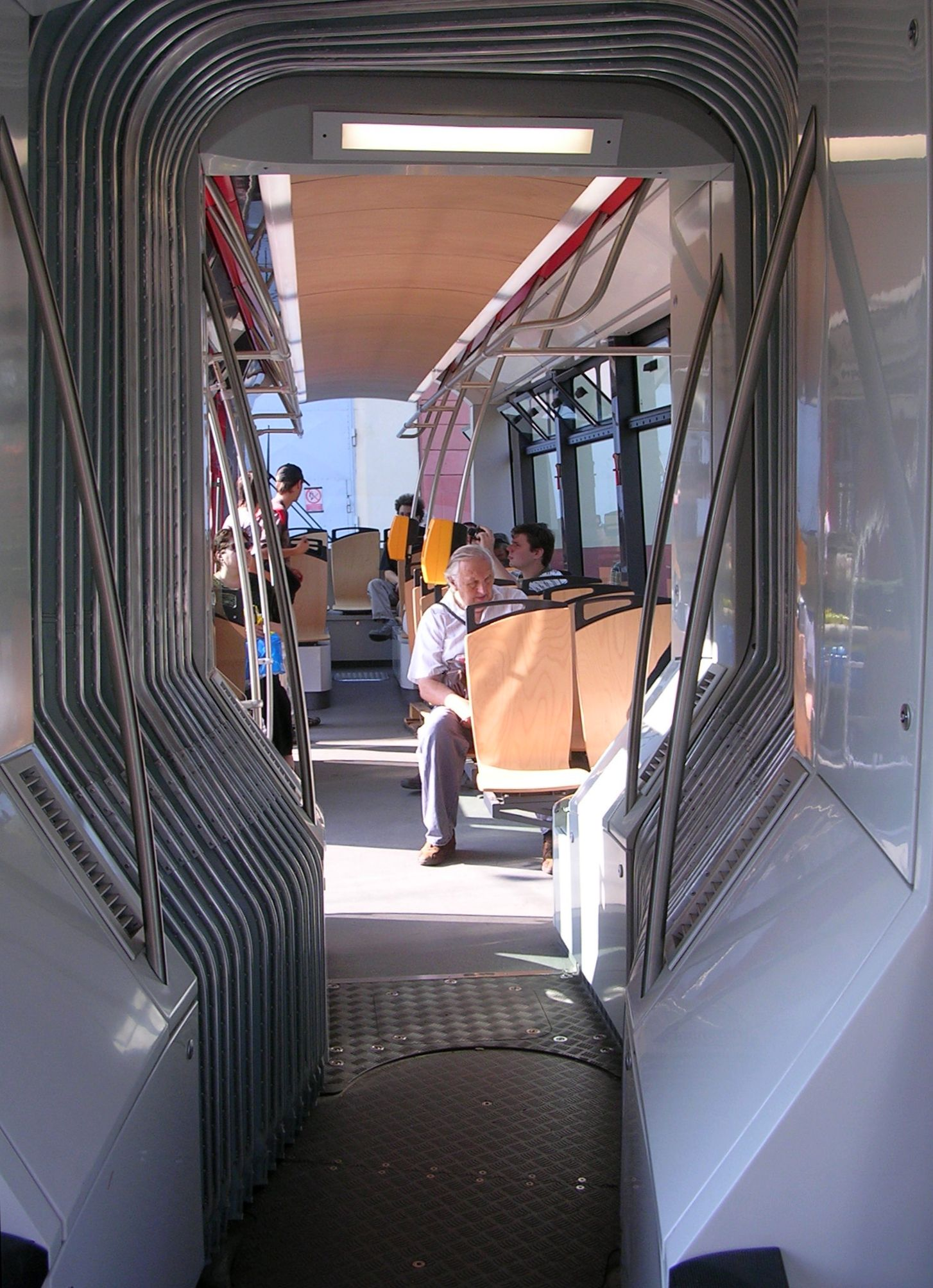
The corridor within the articulation. The wooden seats were chosen by passengers in an internet poll

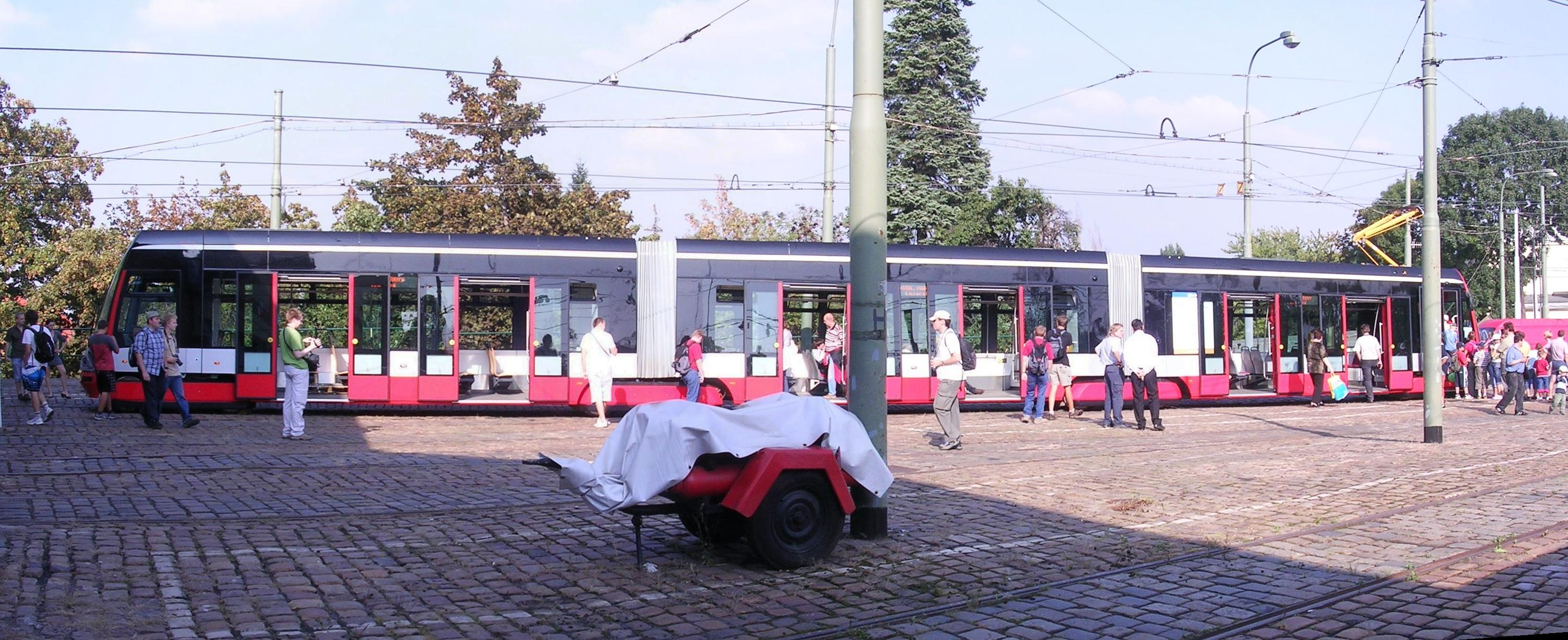
Open Doors Day in Střešovice tram depot and transport museum
