= Škoda Elektra =

Czech tram brand

Škoda Elektra is trade name of line of trams made by Czech company Škoda Transportation in Plzeň. The designation applies to both unidirectional and bidirectional vehicles. The end parts of the vehicles (except 06T and 10T) were created by Porsche Design Group. The vehicles are built in the Škoda factory in Plzeň.

Elektra trams were ordered by transport companies of Brno, Cagliari, Portland, Prague, Tacoma and Wrocław. As of April 2015, 176 units were ordered.

The line of Škoda Elektra trams includes:

== Unidirectional ==
Country	City	Image	Type	Quantity	Year
Czech Republic	Brno		13 T	49	2007–2011; 2015–2016
Czech Republic	Prague		14 T	60	2005–2009
Poland	Wrocław		16 T	17	2006–2007

== Bidirectional ==
Country	City	Image	Type	Quantity	Year
Italy	Cagliari		06 T	9	2006–2007
USA	Portland, Oregon		10 T	7	2000–2002
USA	Tacoma, Washington		10 T	3	2002
Poland	Wrocław		19 T	31	2010–2011
