= Škoda 05 T =

Tram

Škoda 05 T Vektra
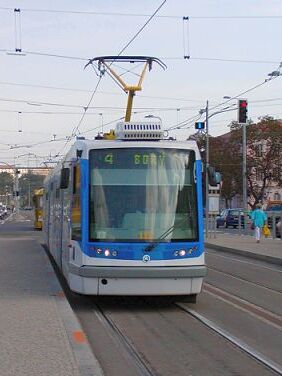
- Škoda 05 T Vektra in Plzeň
- Manufacturer: Škoda Transportation
- Assembly: Plzeň, Czech Republic
- Constructed: 2003
- Successor: Škoda 06 T, 13 T, 14 T, 16 T Elektra
- Capacity: 66 (Seated); 234 (Standing)

Specifications
- Train length: 31,960 mm (104 ft 10 in)
- Width: 2,460 mm (8 ft 1 in)
- Height: 3,460 mm (11 ft 4 in)
- Floor height: 350 mm (13.78 in); 620 mm (24.41 in); 780 mm (30.71 in)
- Low-floor: 40%
- Articulated sections: 4 (5 body sections)
- Steep gradient: (?)
- Minimum turning radius: (?)

The Škoda 05 T, also known as Škoda Vektra (Velkokapacitní tramvaj (High-capacity tram)) was a five-carbody-section low-floor tram developed by Škoda Transportation and based on the Škoda 03 T.

The prototype was built in 2003 and by 2008 was in test service in Plzeň, being dismantled in 2009 shortly after. Newer Škoda trams (06 T, 10 T, 14 T, 16 T) are based on this type.

== Production ==
From 2003-2009, only one prototype was produced.
