= Škoda 14 T =

Czech tram

Škoda 14 T Elektra
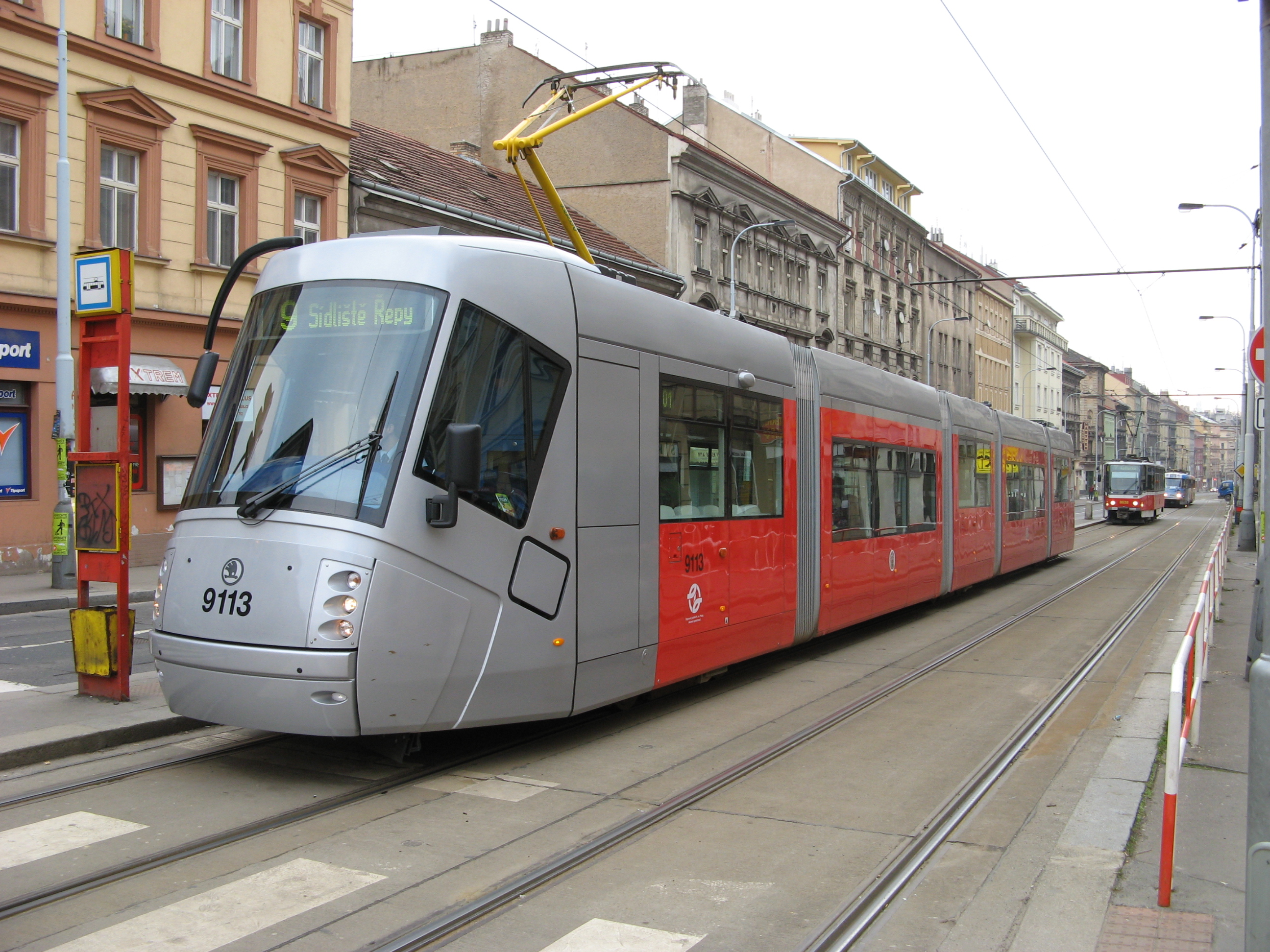
- Škoda 14T in Prague
- Manufacturer: Škoda Transportation
- Designer: Porsche Design Group
- Assembly: Plzeň, Czech Republic
- Family name: Škoda Elektra
- Constructed: 2006–2009
- Number built: 60
- Number in service: 59
- Predecessor: Škoda 05 T Vektra
- Successor: Škoda 15 T ForCity
- Capacity: 69 (Seated); 210 (Standing)

Specifications
- Train length: 31,250 mm (102 ft 6 in)
- Width: 2,460 mm (8 ft 1 in)
- Height: 3,400 mm (11 ft 2 in)
- Floor height: 350 mm (13.78 in); 780 mm (30.71 in)
- Low-floor: 50%
- Doors: 6
- Articulated sections: 4 (5 body sections)
- Maximum speed: limited to 60 km/h (37 mph)
- Weight: 38.3 t (37.7 long tons; 42.2 short tons)
- Steep gradient: 85 ‰ (8.5 %)
- Power output: 540 kW (720 hp) (6 × 90 kW or 120 hp)
- Wheels driven: 100% (12/12)
- Bogies: 3 x fixed
- Minimum turning radius: 25 m (82 ft)/20 m (66 ft)
- Track gauge: 1,435 mm (4 ft 8 1/2 in)

The Škoda 14T (also called Porsche and Elektra) is a five carbody section uni-directional low-floor tram, developed by Škoda Transportation for the Prague tram system. The 14T is the first low-floor tram purchased by the Prague Transport Company.

The vehicle's body was designed by Porsche Design Group. The 14 T has six axles, and the low-floor area represents 50% of the entire vehicle floor. Due to specific Prague conditions it is able to deal with difficult adhesive conditions on grades up to 8.5%. It is based on the Škoda 05 T.

The 14 T was unpopular among Prague residents due it its noise levels. Technical faults including gearbox problems and cracks affected the tram, with Prague Transport Company filing 400 complaints about it by the end of 2012.

== Production ==
Prague Transport Company purchased 60 trams in 2006.

== Accidents ==
On September 19, 2011, the two-car set ČKD Tatra T6A5 operating as line 20 crashed at high speed into a Škoda 14 T, which was stationary at the Kotlářka tram stop in Smíchov. All three vehicles were decommissioned and the accident left one fatality, the driver of the Tatra T6A5. An investigation showed that driver's health problems were most likely the cause of the accident.

== See also ==
- Predecessor: Škoda 05 T - "Vektra"
- Successor: Škoda 15T - "ForCity"
- Related Elektra models: 13 T (Brno), 16 T (Wrocław uni-directional), 19 T (Wrocław bi-directional)

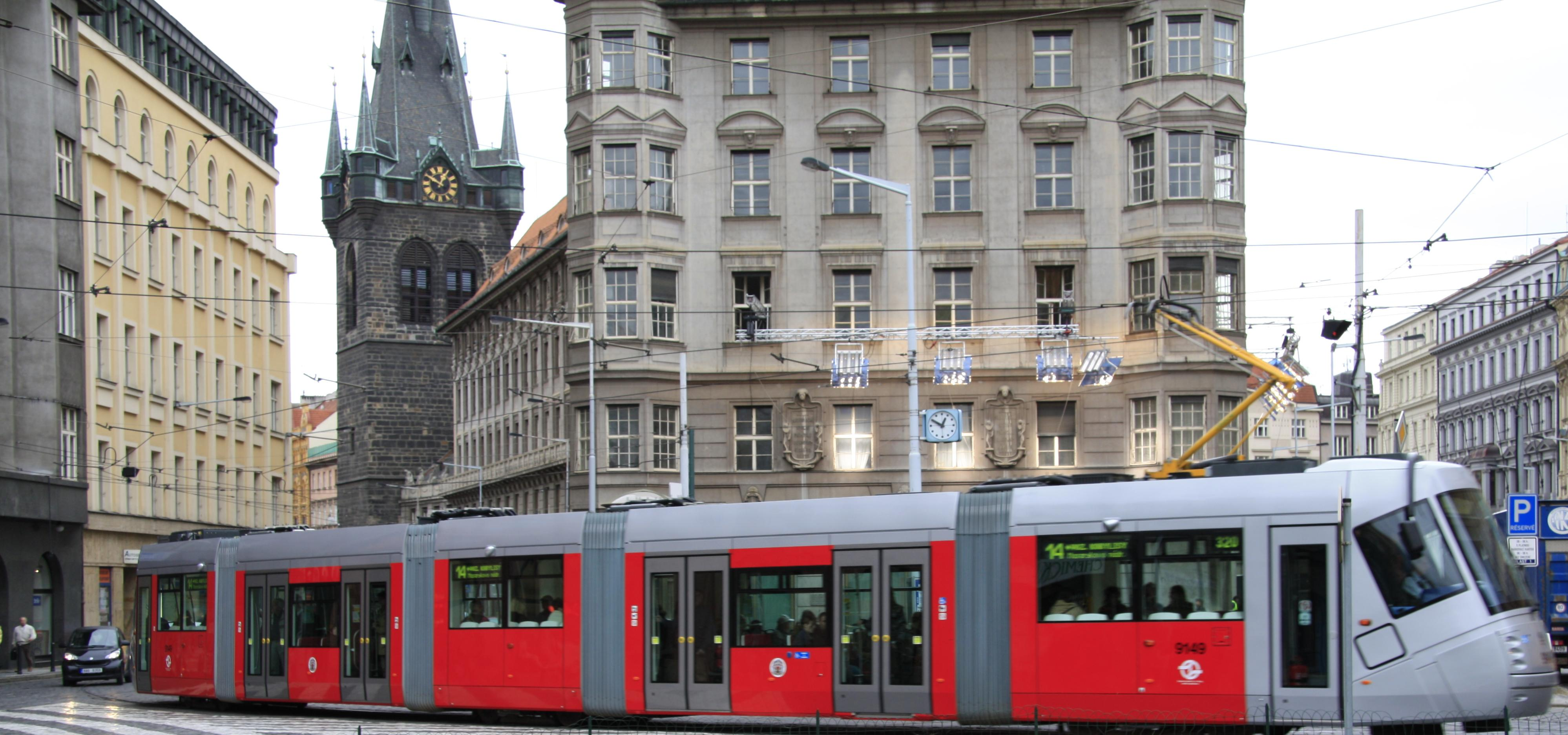

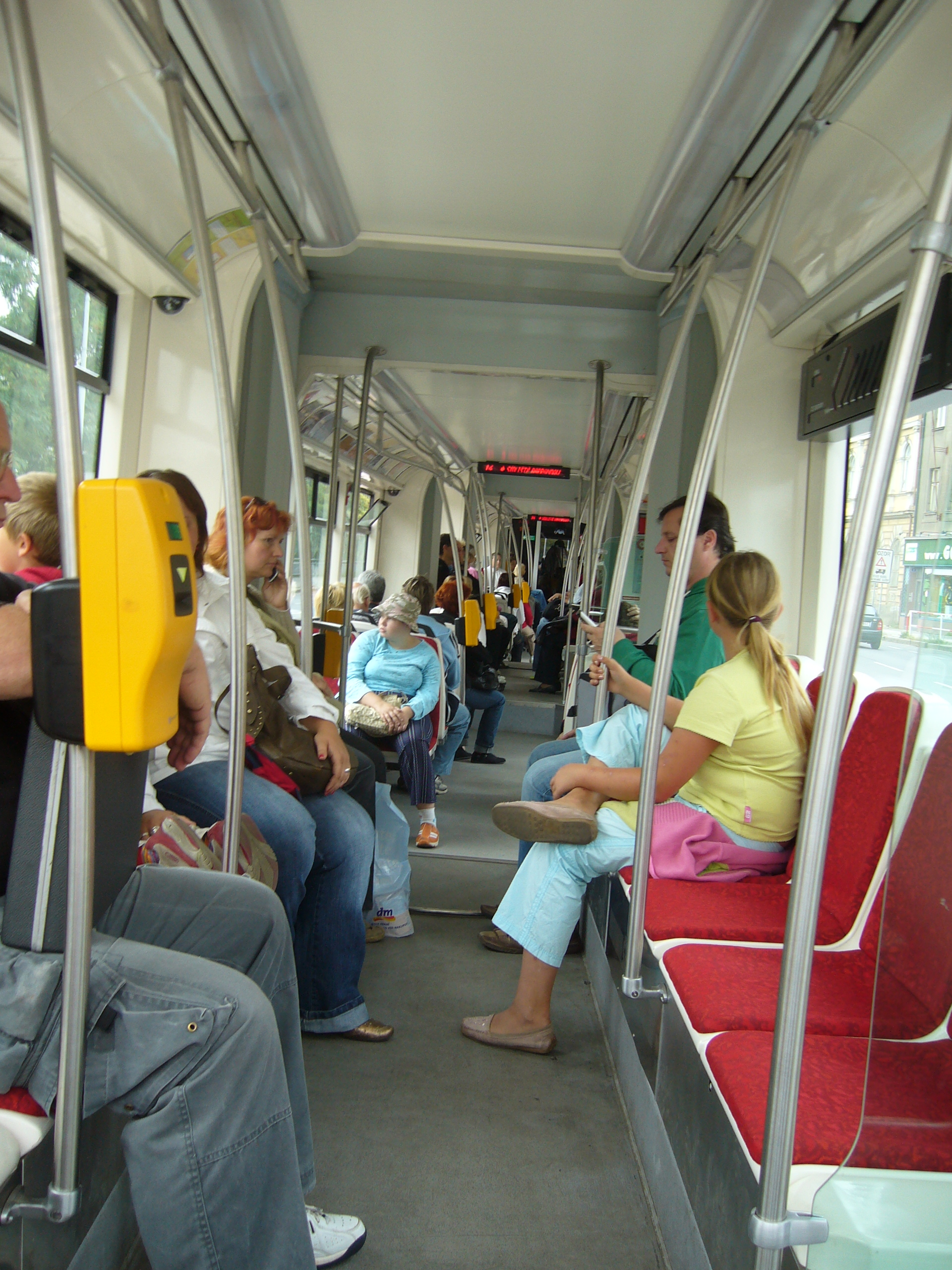
Inside of Škoda 14T

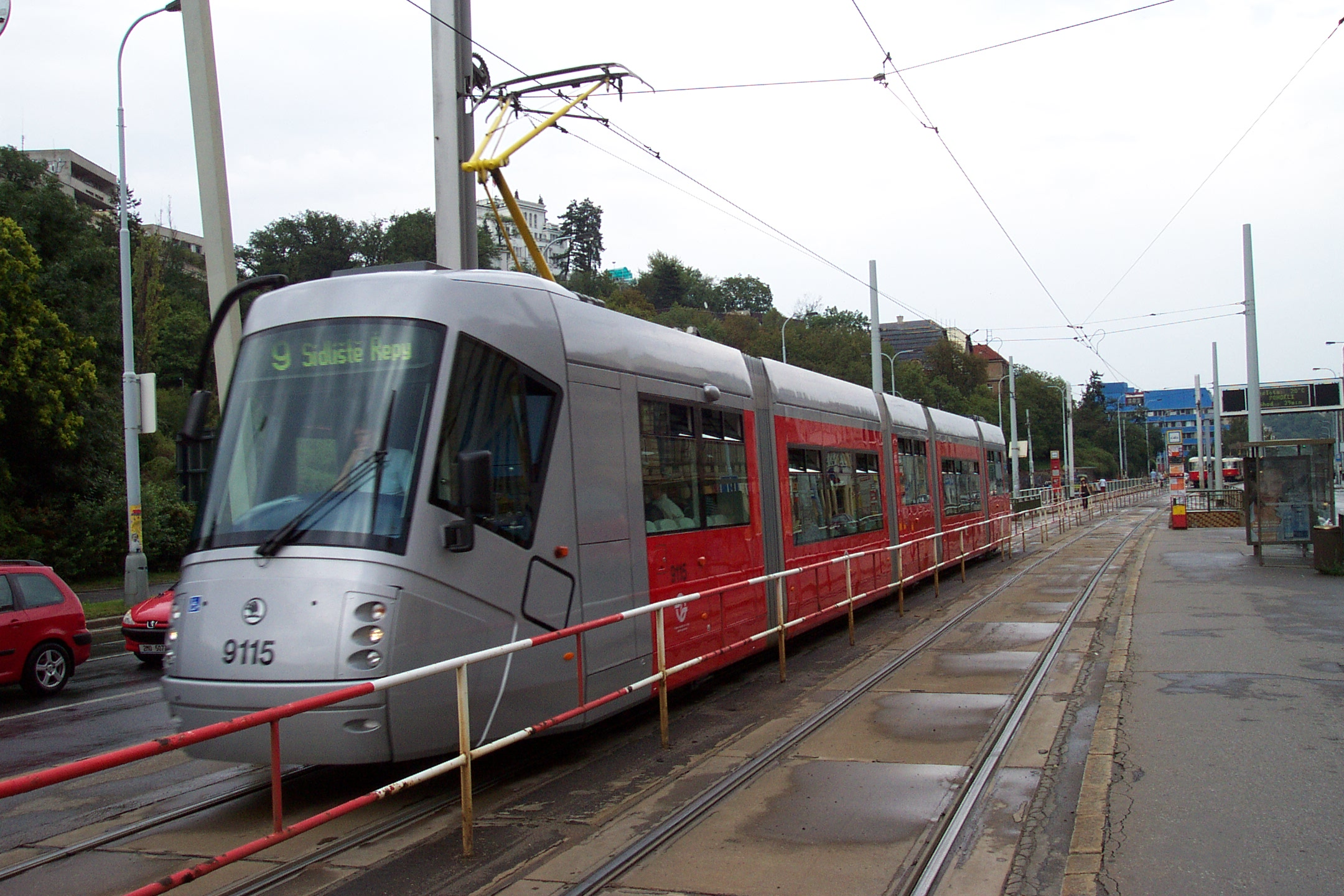
