= Škoda 10 T =

Tram model

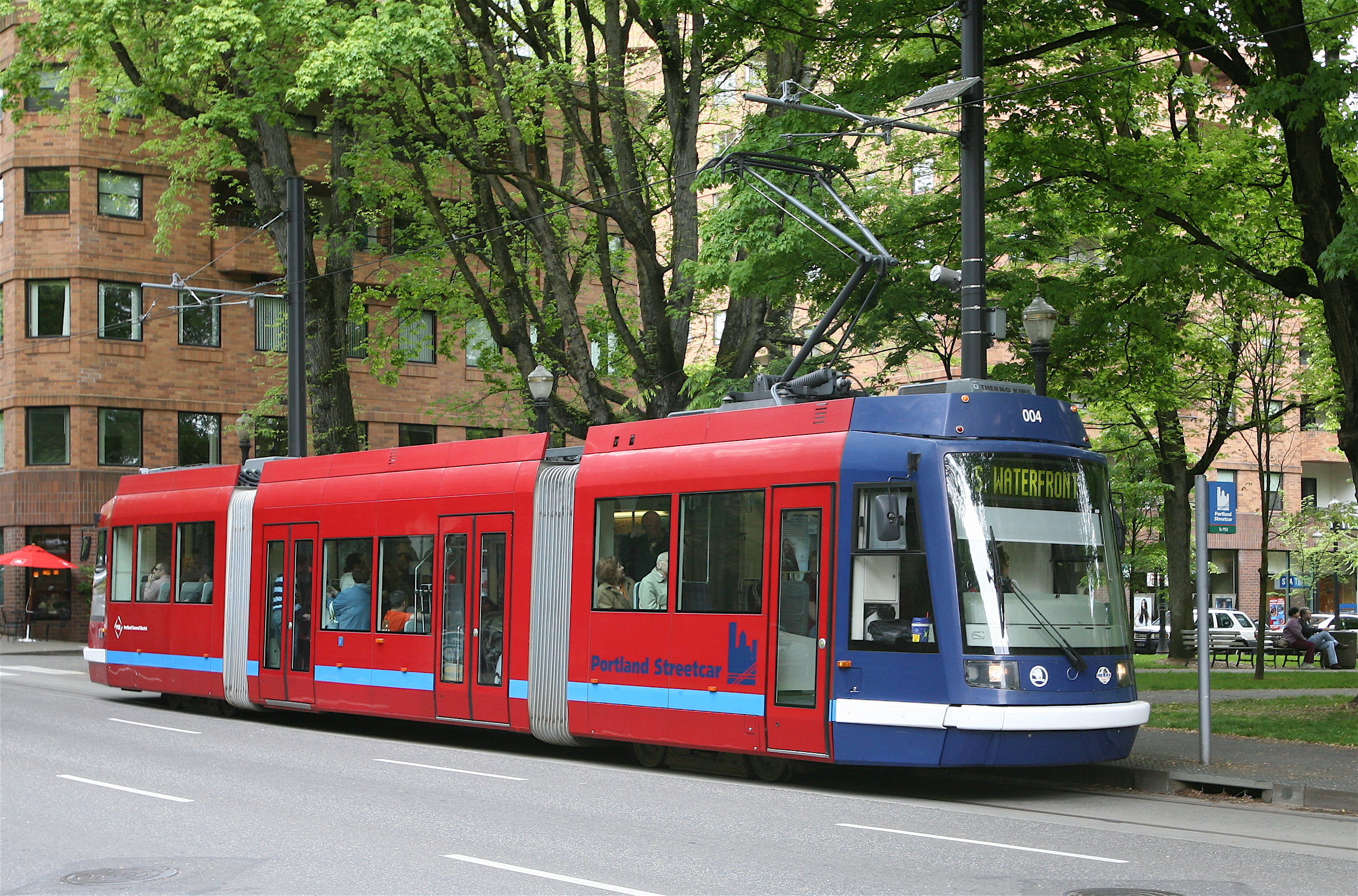
- A Škoda 10 T on the Portland Streetcar
- Manufacturer: Škoda Transportation
- Assembly: Plzeň, Czech Republic
- Family name: Škoda Elektra
- Constructed: 2000–2002
- Successor: Škoda 15 T (or United Streetcar model 100, under license, for the U.S. market)
- Capacity: 157 (30 seated, 127 standing)

Specifications
- Train length: 20.13 m (66 ft 1/2 in)
- Width: 2.46 m (8 ft 7/8 in)
- Height: 3.44 m (11 ft 3 3/8 in)
- Floor height: 350 / 780 mm (13.78 / 30.71 in)
- Low-floor: 50%
- Doors: 6 (3 per side)
- Articulated sections: 3 (two articulations)
- Maximum speed: 70 km/h (43 mph) (design)
- Weight: 28.8 t (28.3 long tons; 31.7 short tons)
- Traction motors: 4 × 90 kW (120 hp)
- Power output: 360 kW (480 hp)
- Electric system(s): Overhead line, 750 V DC
- Current collection: Pantograph
- Bogies: fixed
- Minimum turning radius: 18 m (59 ft)
- Track gauge: 1,435 mm (4 ft 8 1/2 in) standard gauge

The Škoda 10 T, or Skoda 10T, the latter being the common English-language form, is a three-carbody-section low-floor bi-directional tram, developed by Škoda Transportation. It was in production from 2000 to 2002.

The vehicle is four-axled, and is based on the Škoda 03 T, which is a uni-directional model operating in a few cities in the Czech Republic. The low-floor area represents 50% of the entire vehicle floor.

The 10T was originally part of Skoda's Astra model line, although in the United States it was referred to only as the 10T. However, it was later made part of the company's Elektra model line, after that new line of models was created, around 2010.

== Production ==
In total, 10 trams of this model were manufactured by Škoda and delivered to:

- United States:
  - Portland, Oregon: 7 cars, for the Portland Streetcar system, built in 2000–2002
  - Tacoma, Washington: 3 cars, for the Tacoma Link system, built in 2002

Those ten trams were constructed at a Škoda factory in the Czech Republic and shipped complete to the USA, under a joint venture between Škoda and Inekon Group, with Inekon having been responsible for most of the mechanical design, as well as marketing and shipping, and with Škoda having manufactured the vehicles. Their propulsion control equipment was supplied by an Austrian company, Elin EBG Traction, and braking systems by Knorr, under subcontracts.

However, the relationship between Škoda and Inekon deteriorated, and the partnership collapsed in 2001. Škoda 10T cars that had been ordered in 2000 or 2001 were delivered by Inekon to Portland and Tacoma in 2002, which was already after the Škoda-Inekon joint venture had effectively been dissolved. Inekon Group formed a new venture, named DPO Inekon, selling a slightly modified version of the 10T (which it named 12 Trio), while Škoda continued to offer the 10T.

== Related model built under license ==
In 2006, Škoda entered into an agreement with a US company to permit the latter to construct a 10T tram (streetcar) under license. Oregon Iron Works (OIW), a specialized manufacturing company based in Clackamas, Oregon (an unincorporated community in the southeastern suburbs of Portland), signed an exclusive technology transfer agreement with Škoda in February 2006, and in January 2007 it was awarded a contract to build one 10T streetcar for the Portland Streetcar system. OIW created a new subsidiary named United Streetcar LLC for this venture.

This prototype tram, which could be considered an eleventh Škoda 10T but is more accurately described as the first United Streetcar 10T, was completed and delivered to Portland Streetcar in spring 2009. It was designated as model 10T3 by United Streetcar, but that company changed the model designation to "100" for the production-series cars it built later. The prototype US-built 10T was presented to the public and media at a ceremony held on 1 July 2009 in Portland, but it did not enter service until September 2012, delayed first by problems that came to light during acceptance testing and later by a decision to replace its propulsion-control system with a new one built by a US company, in order to increase the US content.

In August 2009, Portland signed a US$20 million contract with United Streetcar for the supply of six more streetcars, but the city decided in 2010 to modify the OIW/United Streetcar contract for these six cars, to substitute equipment from Elin EBG Traction for the originally planned Škoda equipment. (They did not receive the experimental system with which the 10T3 prototype was fitted.) They were delivered in 2013 and 2014.

In 2010, the city of Tucson, Arizona, placed an order with United Streetcar for seven similar trams for a new tram line to be built there, named Sun Link. An eighth was added to the order in July 2012. Designated as model 200, differing from the 100 in having more powerful air conditioning systems, they were delivered in 2013 and 2014.

In April 2012, the District of Columbia Department of Transportation, in Washington, DC, placed an order for two model 100 streetcars for use on the DC Streetcar's H Street/Benning Road Line, under construction for opening in 2015, and the order was expanded to three cars in August 2012. The three cars were delivered between January 2014 and June 2014.

The orders from all three cities were completed in 2014, the last car being delivered to Portland in November of that year. With no standing orders at that time, United Streetcar ceased production. Its tramcar manufacturing facilities in Oregon were repurposed by its parent company, OIW, and United Streetcar was formally dissolved in December 2018.

== Gallery ==
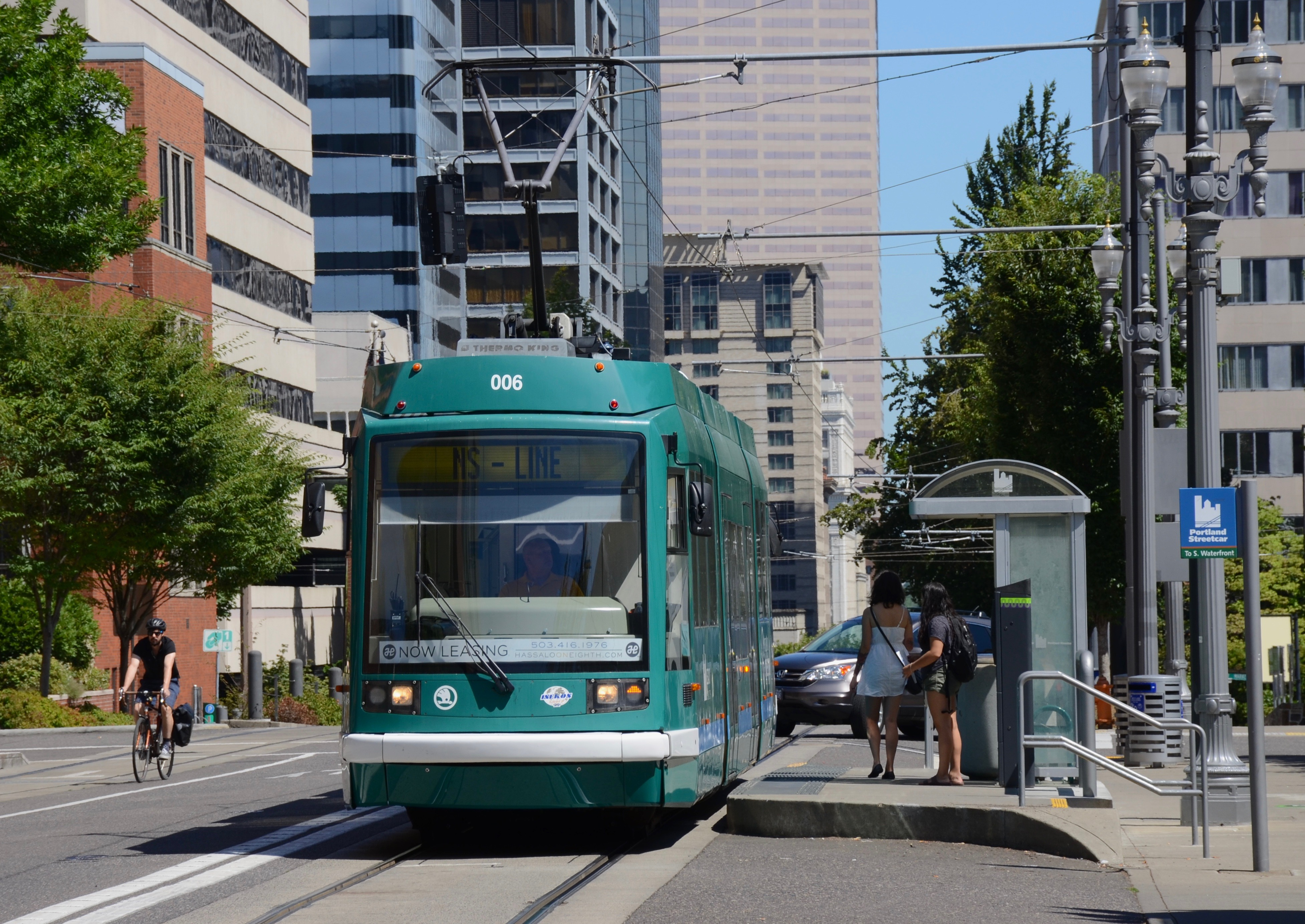
Portland Streetcar tram, with the logos of both Škoda and Inekon on the front

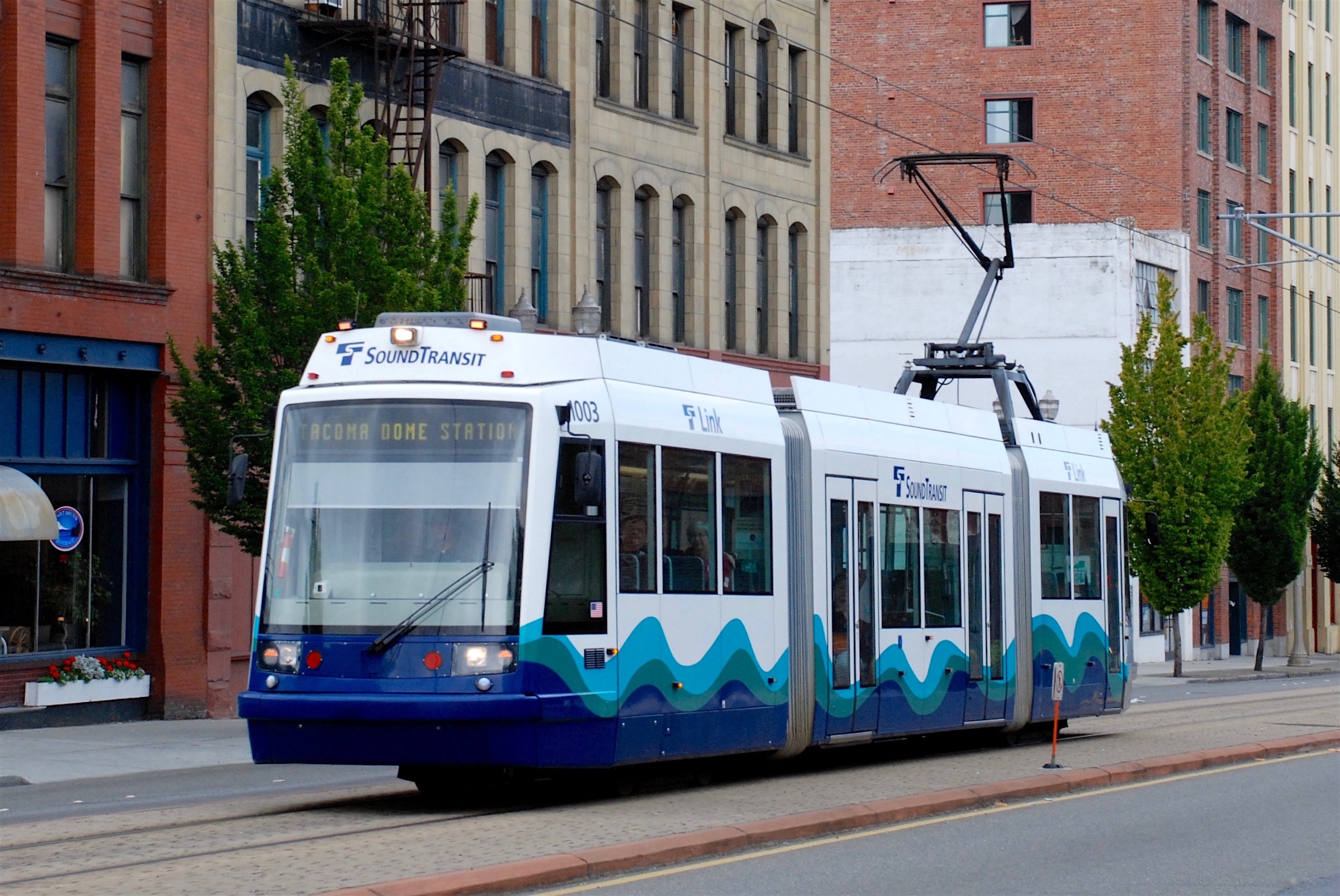
Tacoma Link tramcar

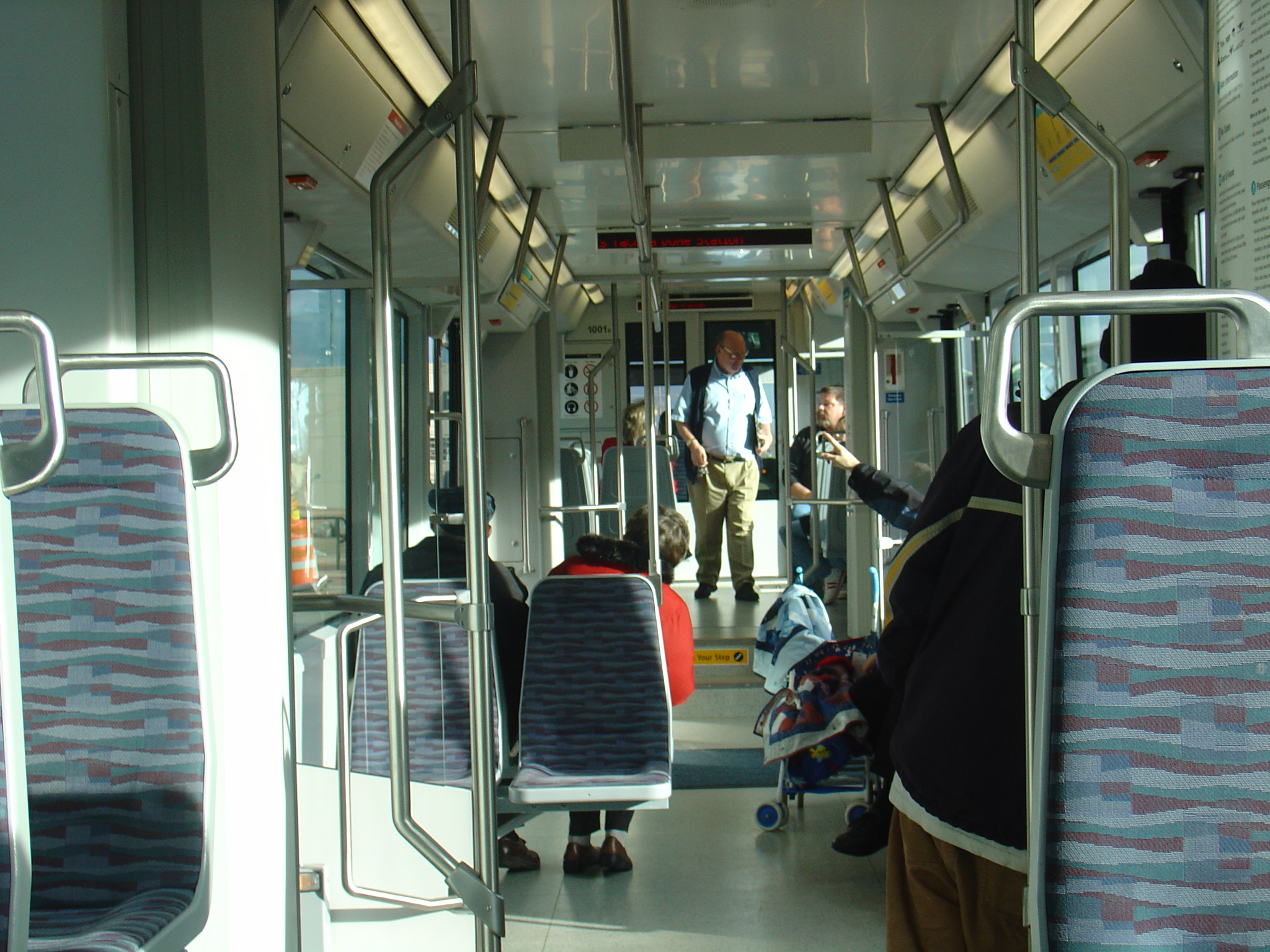
Interior of a Tacoma Link tram

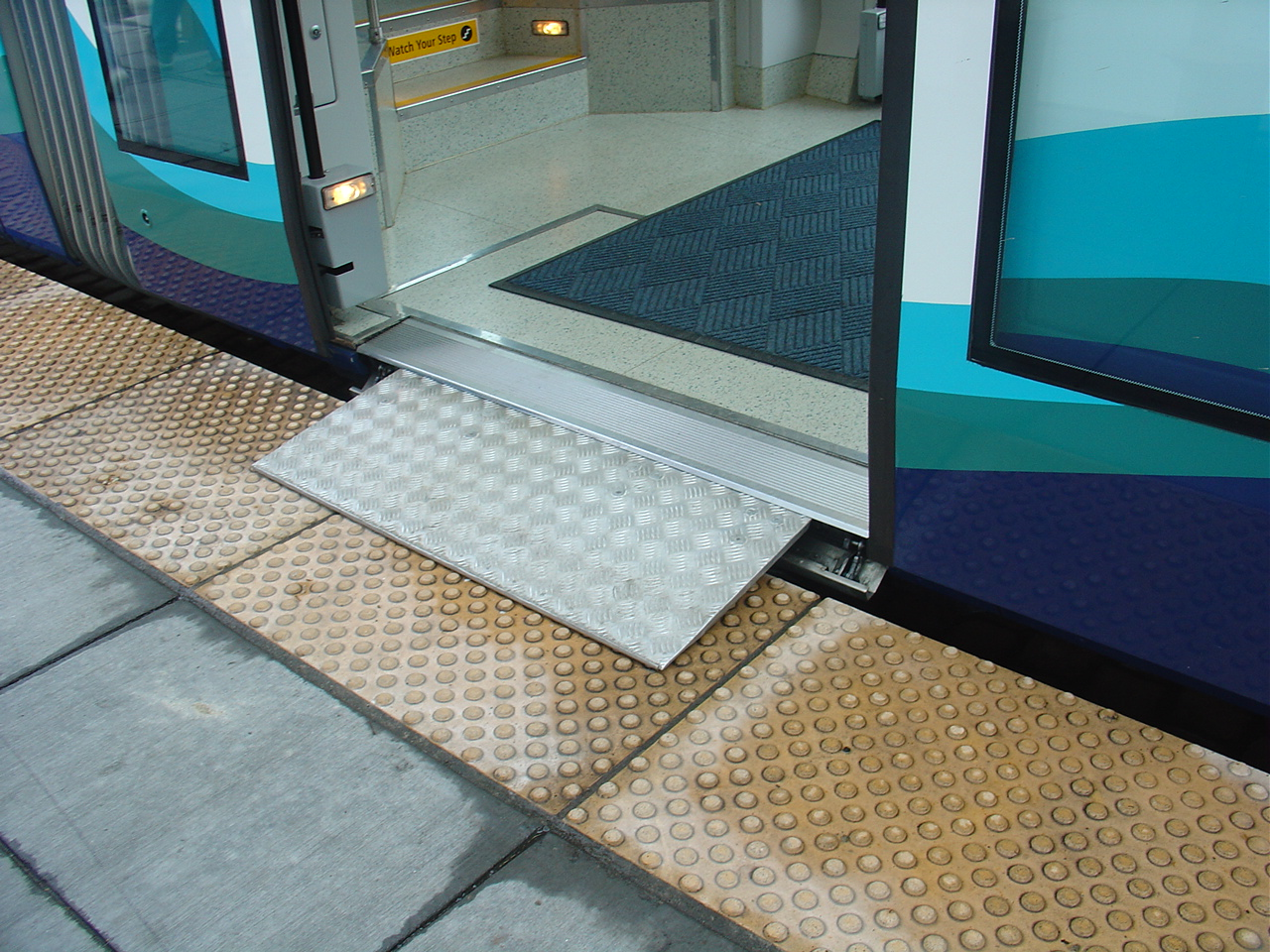
Wheelchair ramp for a Tacoma Link car

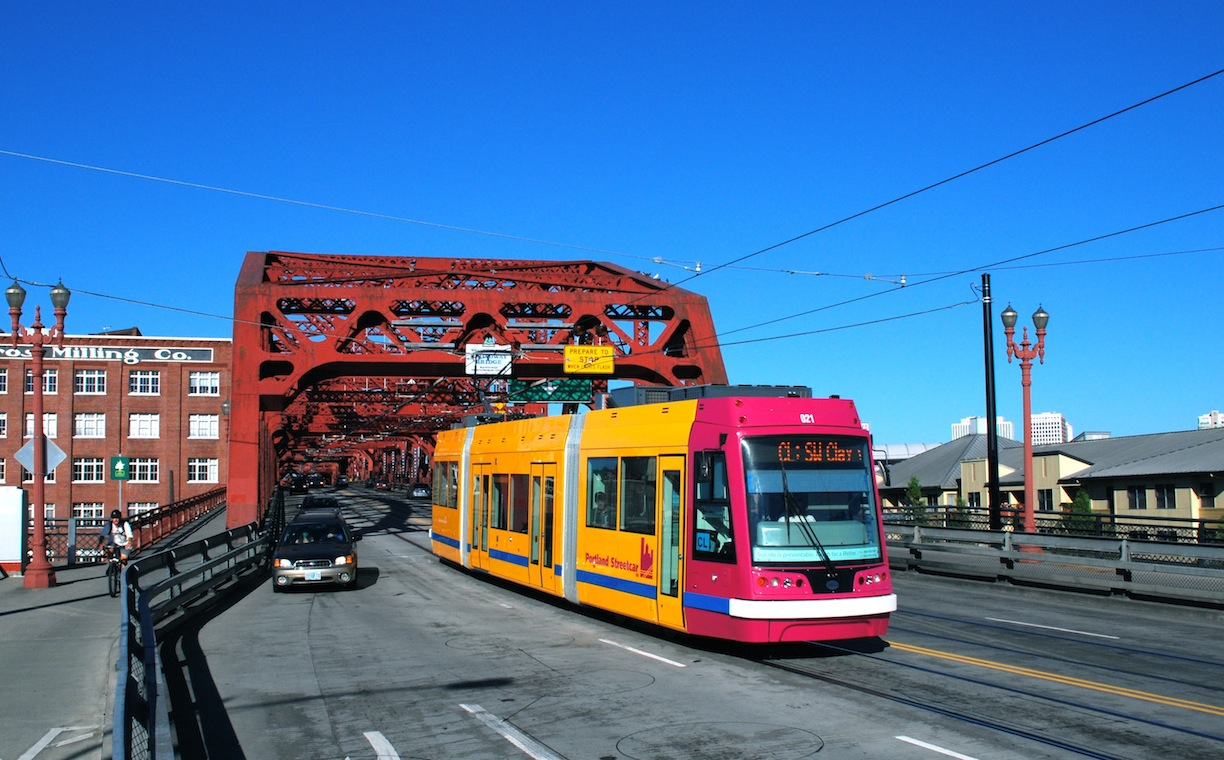
United Streetcar-built tram built for Portland under license from Škoda

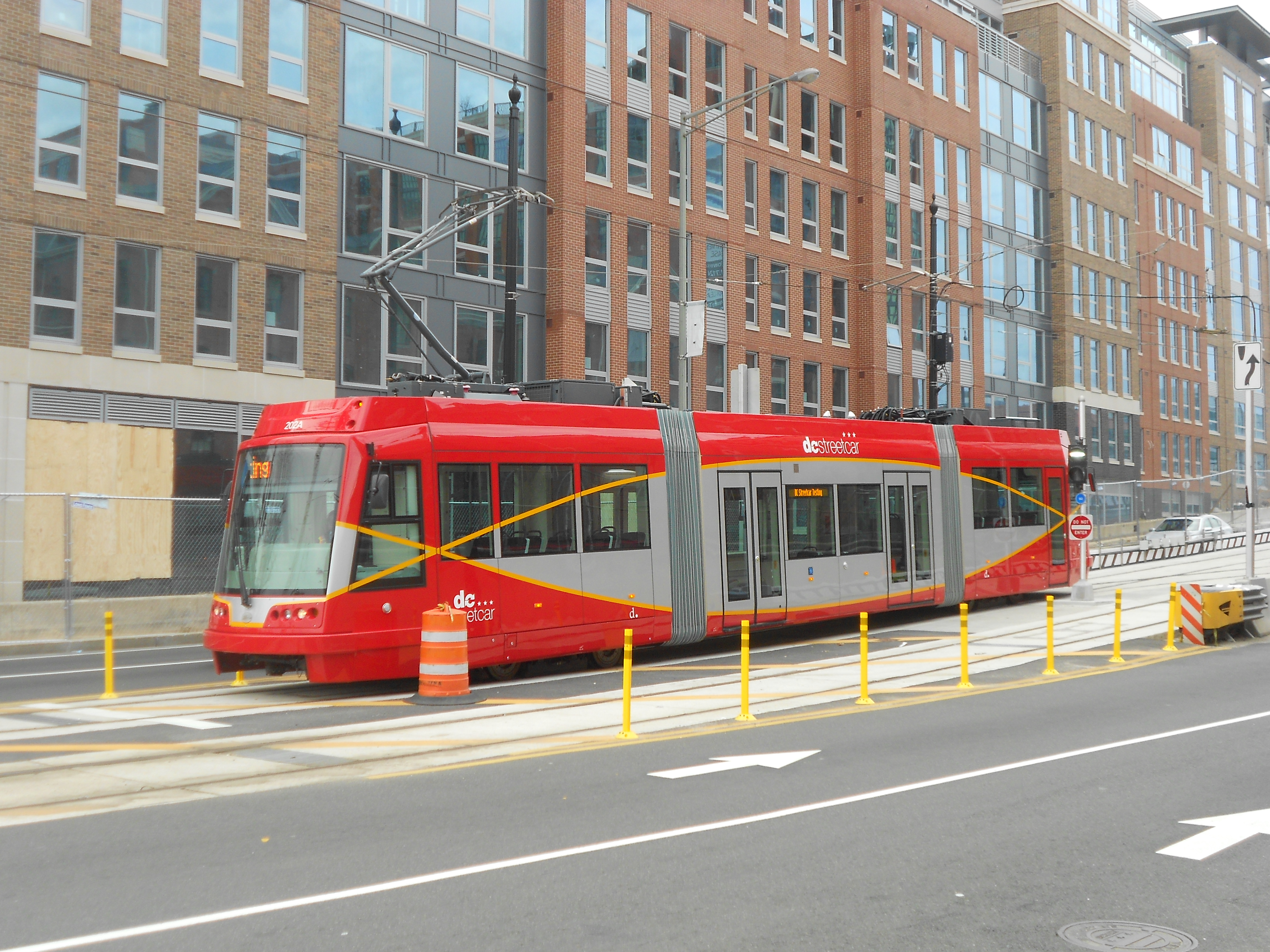
A United Streetcar tram for DC Streetcar

== See also ==
- Škoda 03 T – unidirectional version marketed in Europe
- Škoda 06 T - bidirectional model for Cagliari, Italy
- Škoda 19 T - bidirectional model for Wrocław, Poland
- Inekon Trams – sells the very similar 12 Trio model
- United Streetcar – sold the same tram design built in the USA under Škoda licence, originally (the first car only) with propulsion equipment fabricated by Škoda
