= Oregon Iron Works =

American manufacturer

Coordinates: 45.41986°N 122.56464°W

Oregon Iron Works, Inc.
- Company type: Private
- Industry: Aerospace, defense, renewable energy, structural engineering, transportation
- Founded: 1944
- Fate: Acquired by Vigor Industrial
- Headquarters: Clackamas, Oregon, U.S.
- Number of locations: 2
- Area served: Worldwide
- Revenue: Approx. US$70 million (2006)
- Number of employees: 400+
- Subsidiaries: United Streetcar, LLC

Oregon Iron Works, Inc. (OIW) was an American manufacturing company based in Clackamas, Oregon (within the Portland metropolitan area). Established in 1944, it was involved in a number of different industries, supplying products ranging from high-speed boats for military use to purpose-built girders for roadway bridges. It had production facilities in Clackamas and Vancouver, Washington. In May 2014, the company announced that it was merging with Portland-based Vigor Industrial. Vigor announced that it would be shutting down its complex fabrication operations at the former Oregon Iron works in 2025.

== United Streetcar ==
In 2007, the company entered the field of streetcar (tram) manufacturing, after being awarded a contract, in January 2007, by the City of Portland for the provision of a prototype U.S.-manufactured streetcar for the Portland Streetcar system. The company had signed a technology transfer agreement with Škoda, of the Czech Republic, in February 2006, enabling it to offer to build the already existing Škoda 10 T design, under license from the Czech manufacturer. Upon being awarded the contract, OIW created a new subsidiary, United Streetcar, LLC, for its streetcar manufacturing activity. The prototype streetcar was completed and delivered in mid-2009, and in August 2009 United Streetcar received a contract from the City of Portland for another six 10T streetcars. The announcement of a second order for production-series vehicles soon followed, from the City of Tucson, Arizona. Washington D.C. also ordered two cars from United in April 2012 and a third in August 2012.

== See also ==
- Oregon Iron Works Sea Scout
