= Škoda 16 T =

Škoda 16 T Elektra
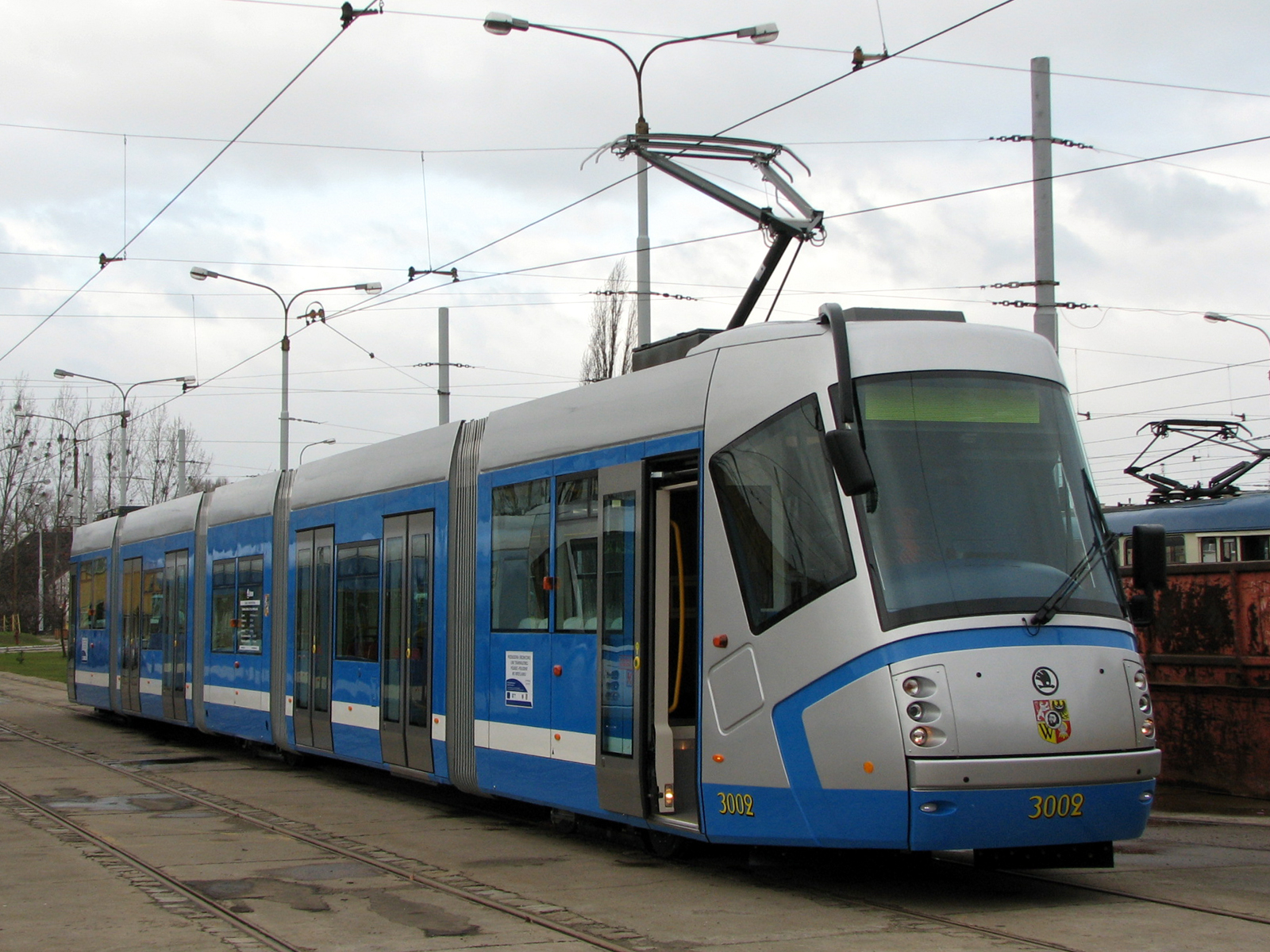
- Škoda 16T trams in Wrocław, Poland
- Manufacturer: Škoda Transportation
- Designer: Porsche Design Group
- Assembly: Plzeň, Czech Republic
- Family name: Škoda Elektra
- Constructed: 2006–present
- Number built: 17
- Predecessor: Škoda 05 T Vektra
- Successor: Škoda 15 T ForCity
- Capacity: 69 (Seated); 210 (Standing)

Specifications
- Train length: 30,250 mm (99 ft 3 in)
- Width: 2,460 mm (8 ft 1 in)
- Height: 3,600 mm (11 ft 10 in)
- Floor height: 350 mm (13.78 in); 780 mm (30.71 in)
- Low-floor: 65%
- Doors: 6
- Articulated sections: 4 (5 body sections)
- Maximum speed: 70 km/h (43 mph)
- Weight: 37.4 t (36.8 long tons; 41.2 short tons)
- Power output: 360 kW (480 hp) (4 × 90 kW or 120 hp)
- Wheels driven: 66% (8/12)
- Bogies: 3 x fixed
- Minimum turning radius: 25 m (82 ft)/20 m (66 ft)
- Track gauge: 1,435 mm (4 ft 8 1/2 in)

The Škoda 16 T (also called Elektra) is a five carbody section low-floor uni-directional tram, developed by Škoda Transportation for Wrocław.

The vehicle was designed by Porsche Design Group. The 16 T has six axles, and the low-floor area represents 65% of the entire vehicle floor. It is based on the Škoda 05 T.

== Production ==
As of winter 2007, 17 trams were ordered and delivered to Wrocław. There were plans of buying additional 7 trams with the Škoda 19 T shipment, but all the plans have been canceled.

== Equipment ==
The Škoda 16 T is equipped according to all standards. The things that is missing alongside the Air-Conditioning is a Monitoring System. Due to this fact the back end of the tram has faced vandals, though it is not as badly damaged as the rear carriage of the Konstal 105NWr.

== See also ==
- Related models: 13 T (Brno), 14 T (Prague), 19 T (Wrocław bi-directional)

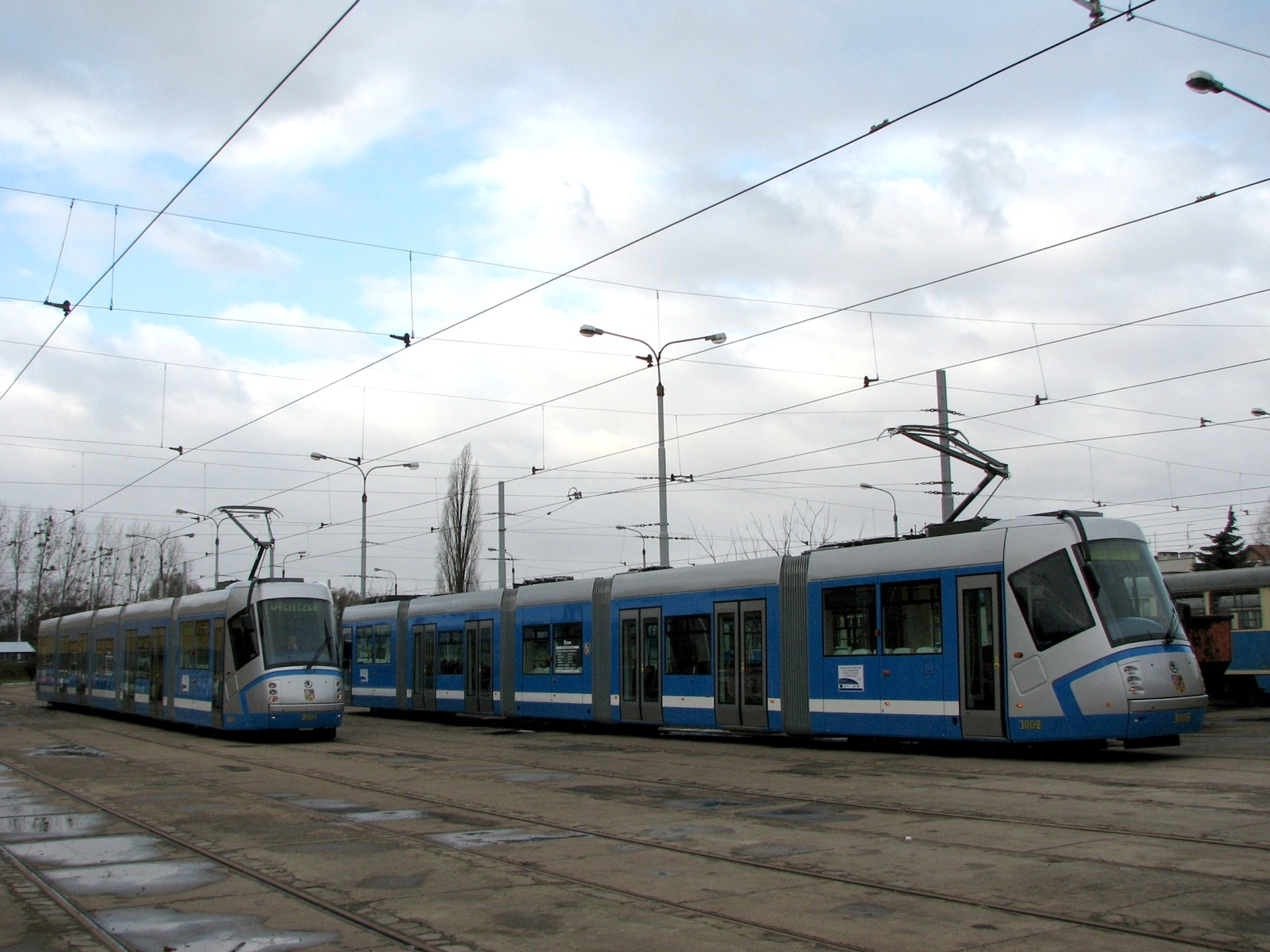

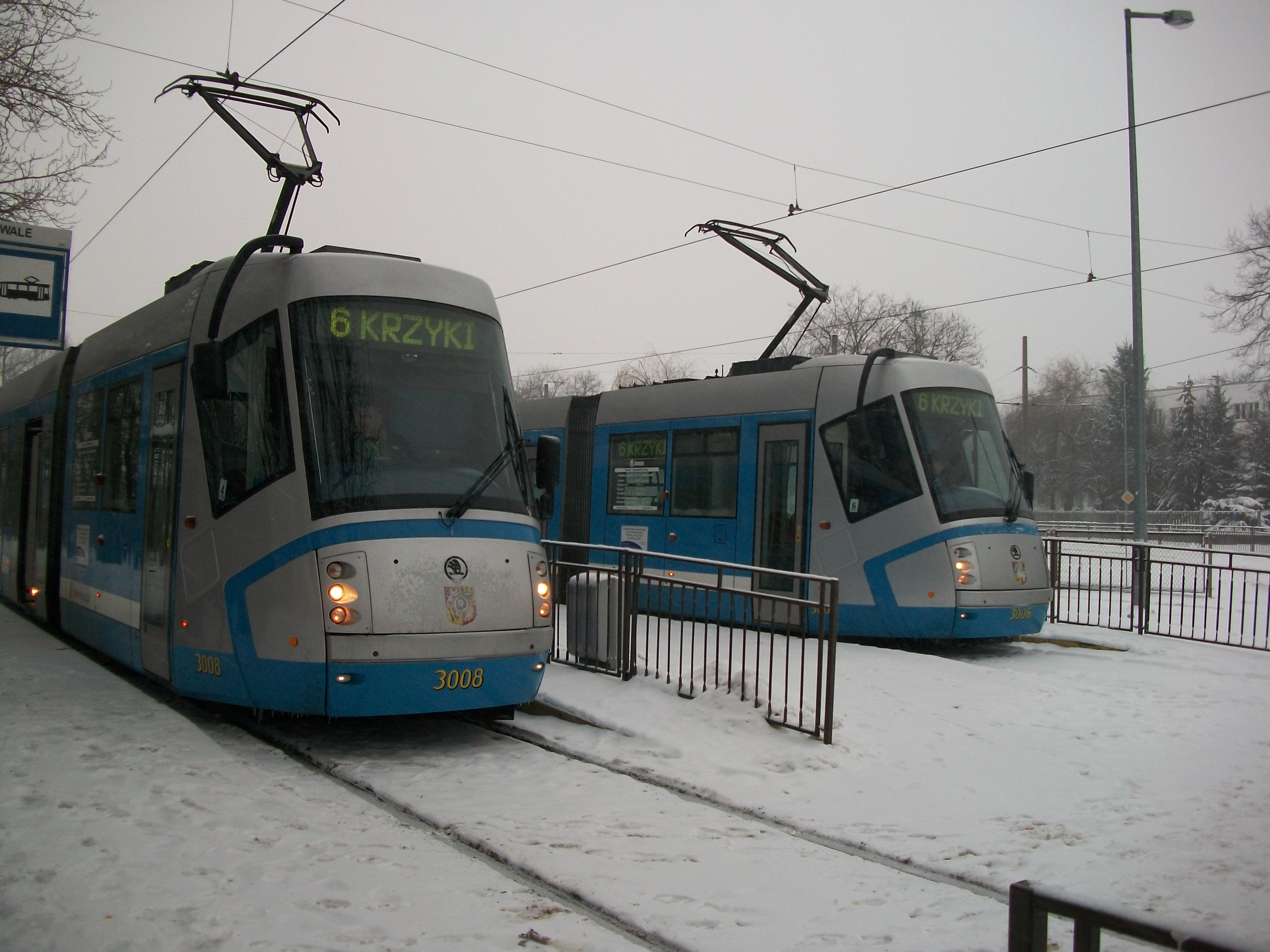

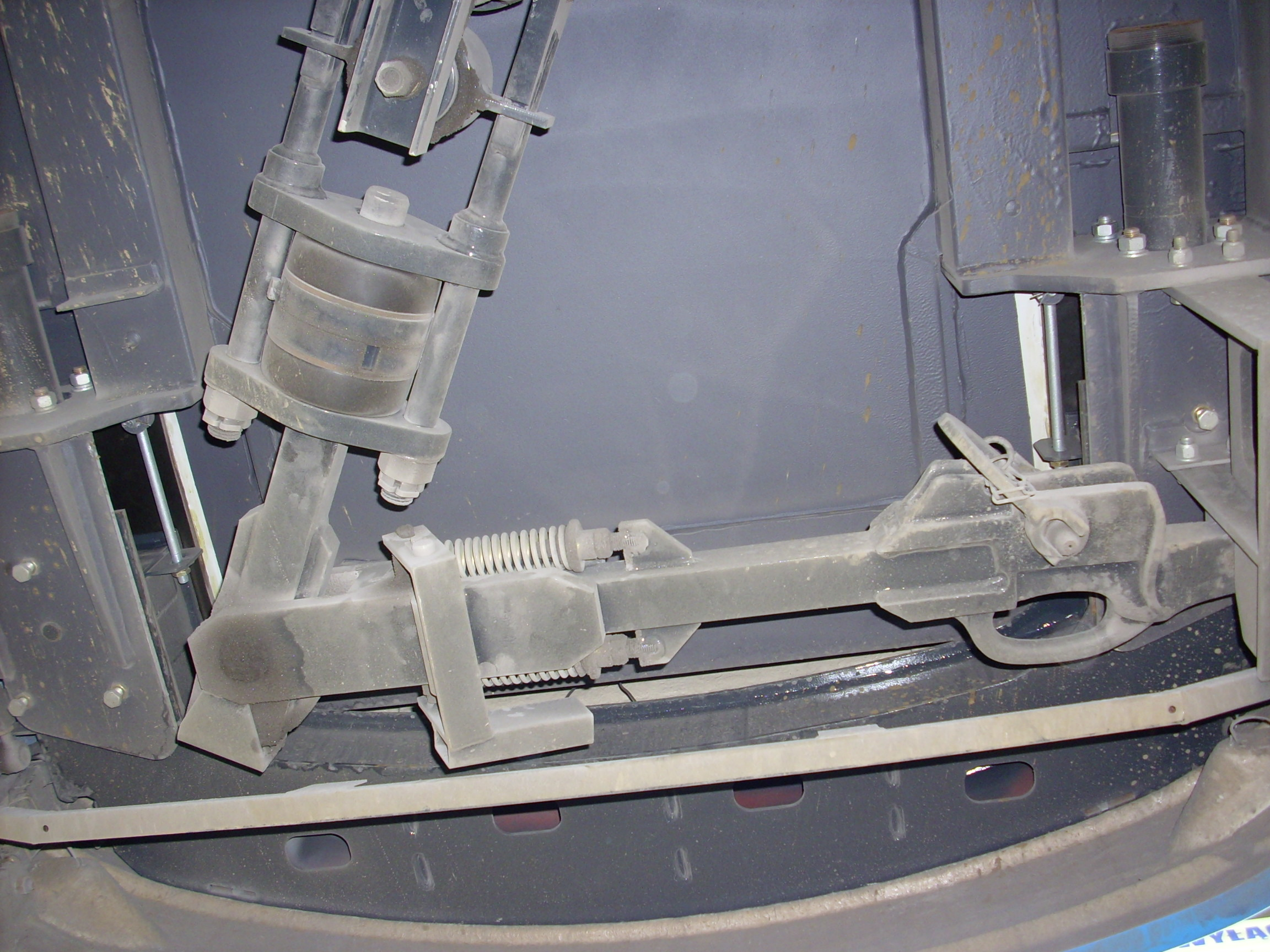
Albert coupler hidden under the floor

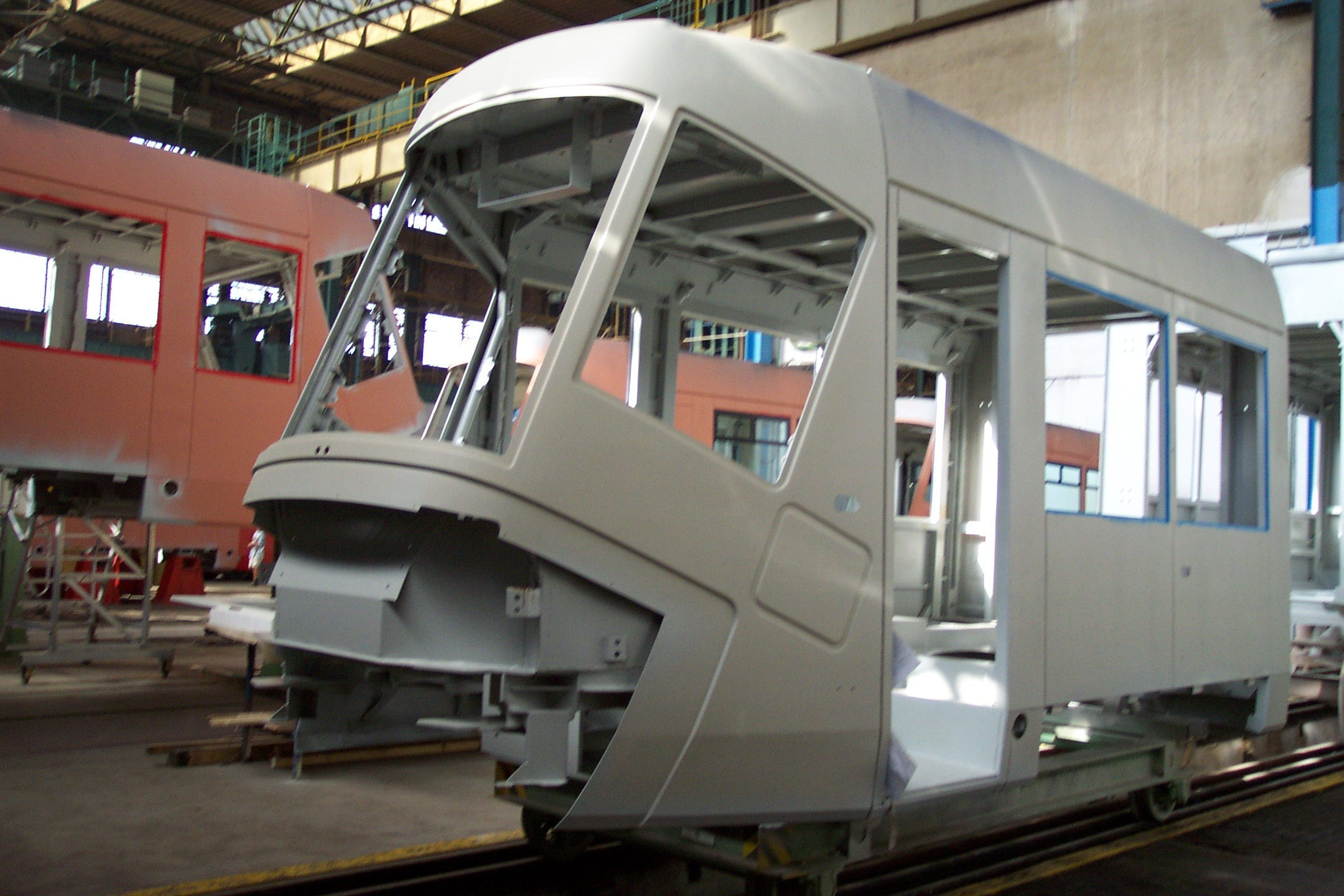
Chassis of Škoda Elektra
