= United Streetcar =

Rolling stock manufacturer

Coordinates: 45.41986°N 122.56464°W

United Streetcar, LLC
- Type: Private (subsidiary of Oregon Iron Works)
- Industry: Transportation
- Founded: 2005
- Defunct: 2015
- Fate: Dissolved.
- Headquarters: Clackamas, Oregon, United States
- Products: Streetcars (trams)
- Website: www.unitedstreetcar.com

United Streetcar, LLC, was an American manufacturer of modern streetcars, located in the Clackamas area in the southeastern suburbs of Portland, Oregon, founded in 2005. It was the only U.S. company building modern streetcars—as distinct from light rail cars or new replicas of historic streetcars—until 2013, when Brookville received its first order for a modern (as opposed to faux historic) streetcar, for the Dallas Streetcar.

United Streetcar was a limited liability company and was a wholly owned subsidiary of Oregon Iron Works, Inc. (OIW), which has been in business since 1944. It was originally reported to have been established in early 2007, after OIW was the successful bidder for a contract to construct a prototype streetcar for the city of Portland, but in 2010 the company clarified that it had been formed in December 2005. The company completed its first streetcar in 2009. It was dissolved in February 2015.

== History ==
Oregon Iron Works, a specialized manufacturer of complex structural components and systems, began considering entering the field of streetcar manufacturing in 2004, after realizing that the Portland Streetcar system had purchased vehicles built only by foreign manufacturers, possibly due to the absence of any U.S.-based manufacturers of modern streetcars.

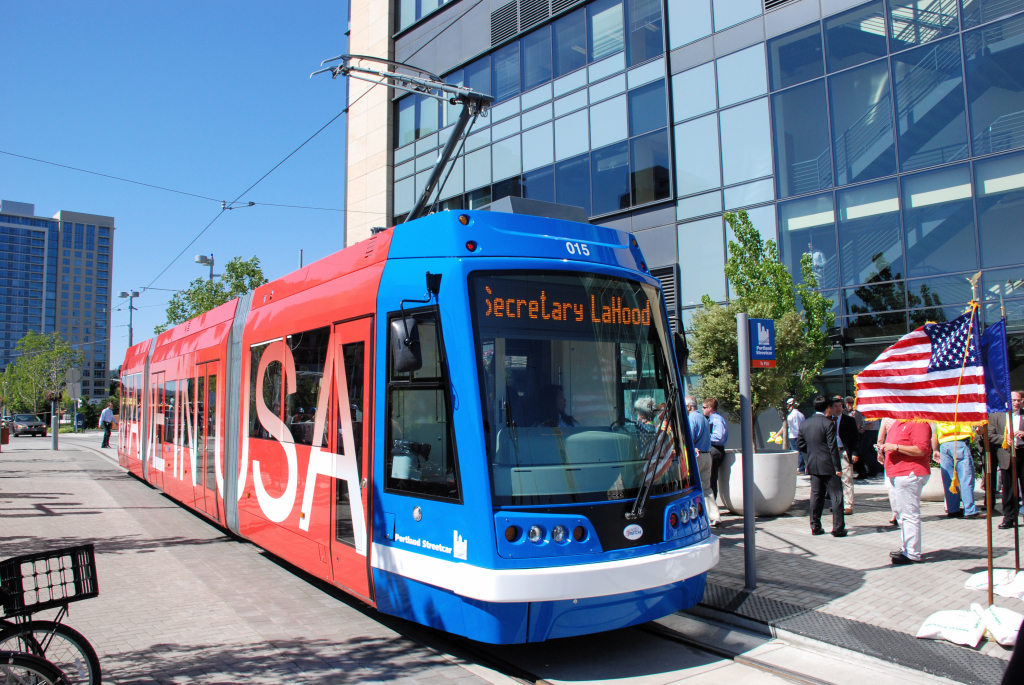
The prototype streetcar built by United Streetcar, at its unveiling in Portland in July 2009

In 2005, Congress approved a federal transportation spending bill which included a US$4 million grant to TriMet for the acquisition, on behalf of the city of Portland, of a prototype domestically manufactured streetcar. With a goal of fostering the domestic production of modern streetcars, the grant had been added into the $286 billion spending bill by Oregon Congressman Peter DeFazio, but did not specify a particular company to be the recipient.

In August 2006, the city of Portland issued a Request for Proposals for the provision of a prototype low-floor streetcar compatible with Portland Streetcar's existing fleet. In anticipation of this, OIW signed a "technology transfer agreement" in February 2006 with Škoda, the Czech company which had built Portland's first seven streetcars, in order to permit OIW to manufacture a streetcar to the existing Škoda 10T design but with mostly U.S. components and assembly. Only two formal proposals were received by the city, and after that of the other bidder was "deemed not to have met the minimum requirement", the contract was awarded to Oregon Iron Works, in January 2007. OIW then announced that it had created a new subsidiary, United Streetcar, LLC, to handle streetcar manufacturing. The value of the contract was $3.2 million, with the balance of the special $4 million federal grant being used to fund the city's costs to administer the grant and oversee the project.

== Prototype development ==
Construction of the prototype streetcar was undertaken at OIW's Clackamas facility (one of two OIW manufacturing facilities). The car was completed in June 2009 and was introduced to the public and the media at a ceremony held in Portland's South Waterfront district on July 1, 2009.

Numbered 015 in the Portland Streetcar fleet, it was the first modern streetcar built in the United States since 1952, since the last PCC streetcar for the San Francisco Municipal Railway. It uses the Škoda 10T design, under license from the Czech manufacturer, and is model variant 10T3. The propulsion equipment—the motors and electronic control system—were fabricated by Škoda, but installation took place at OIW's/United Streetcar's plant in the United States, and most other components were fabricated by United Streetcar or supplied by other U.S. companies. Overall, the prototype streetcar has about 70 percent U.S. content, enough to make the car's procurement compliant with federal "Buy America" provisions (49 U.S.C. § 5323j).

As with the earlier, Czech-built versions of the Škoda 10T, the United Streetcar 10T3 is a four-axle, bi-directional, low-floor streetcar with three doors on each side and wheelchair ramps extending (on demand) from one door per side. It is 66 feet 1 inch (20.13 m) long and 8 feet 1 inch (2.46 m) wide and has a maximum speed of 44 mph (71 km/h). In 2010, the company dropped the 10T3 designation in favor of a new model designation, "100", in connection with a decision to use different propulsion equipment in future orders, as described below.

=== Change in propulsion system ===
In 2010, Portland amended its contract with United Streetcar and Oregon Iron Works to replace the prototype's streetcar's Škoda-made propulsion-control system with equipment developed by Rockwell Automation, based in Milwaukee, Wisconsin. The propulsion system is the high-tech electronic equipment which controls and coordinates the operation of the car's motors and other key operating components. The decision followed problems identified during acceptance testing in 2009 and unsuccessful efforts to resolve them with Škoda. The change was also intended to increase the vehicle's U.S.-made content. In April 2010, the Federal Transit Administration approved a $2.4 million grant, supplemented by $600,000 in local funding, to support the replacement. The new system was expected to increase the streetcar's domestic content from approximately 70% to 90%.

Prototype streetcar 015 was transported back to the OIW/United Streetcar factory in May 2010, to await design and then installation of the Rockwell system. With the installation completed in late 2011, it returned to the Portland Streetcar carhouse on April 30, 2012, to begin acceptance testing. It entered service on September 22, 2012; however, since 2012, issues have still plagued car 015 and it is currently sitting in the Portland Streetcar yard unused in day-to-day operations.

== Production ==
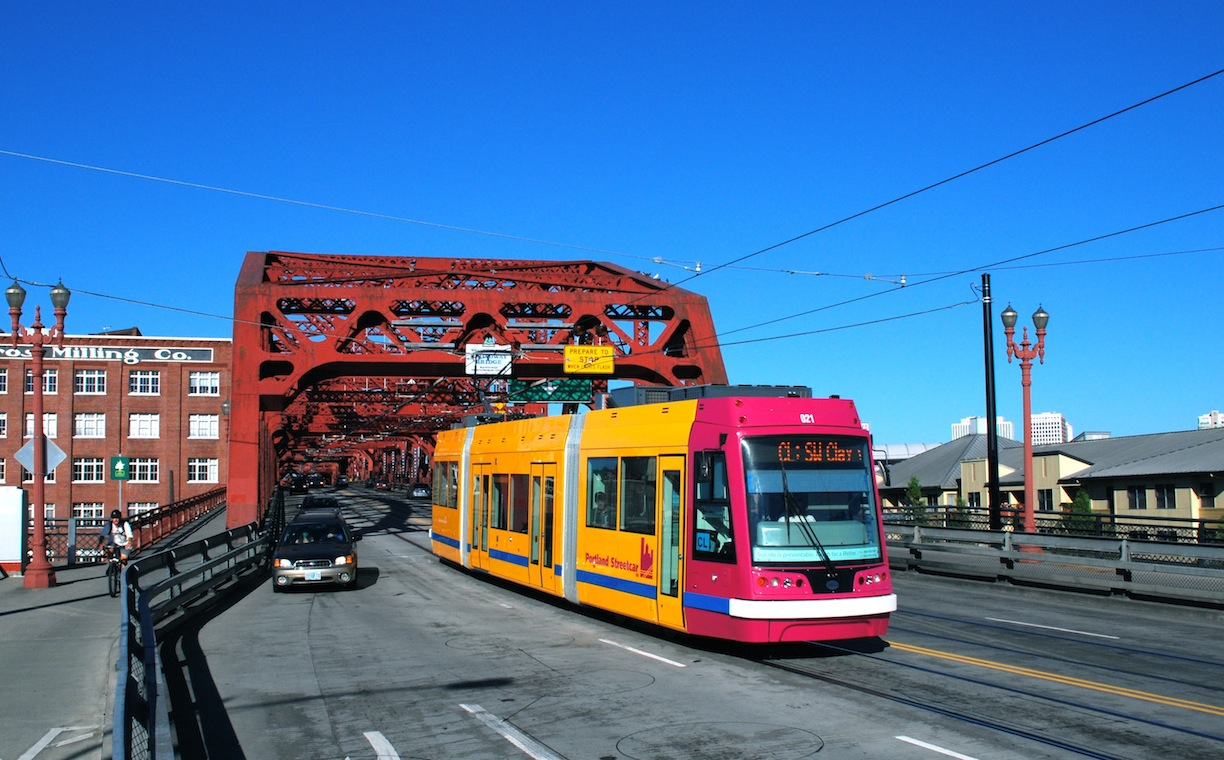
The first production-series United Streetcar-built streetcar, Portland's car 021, entered service in 2013.

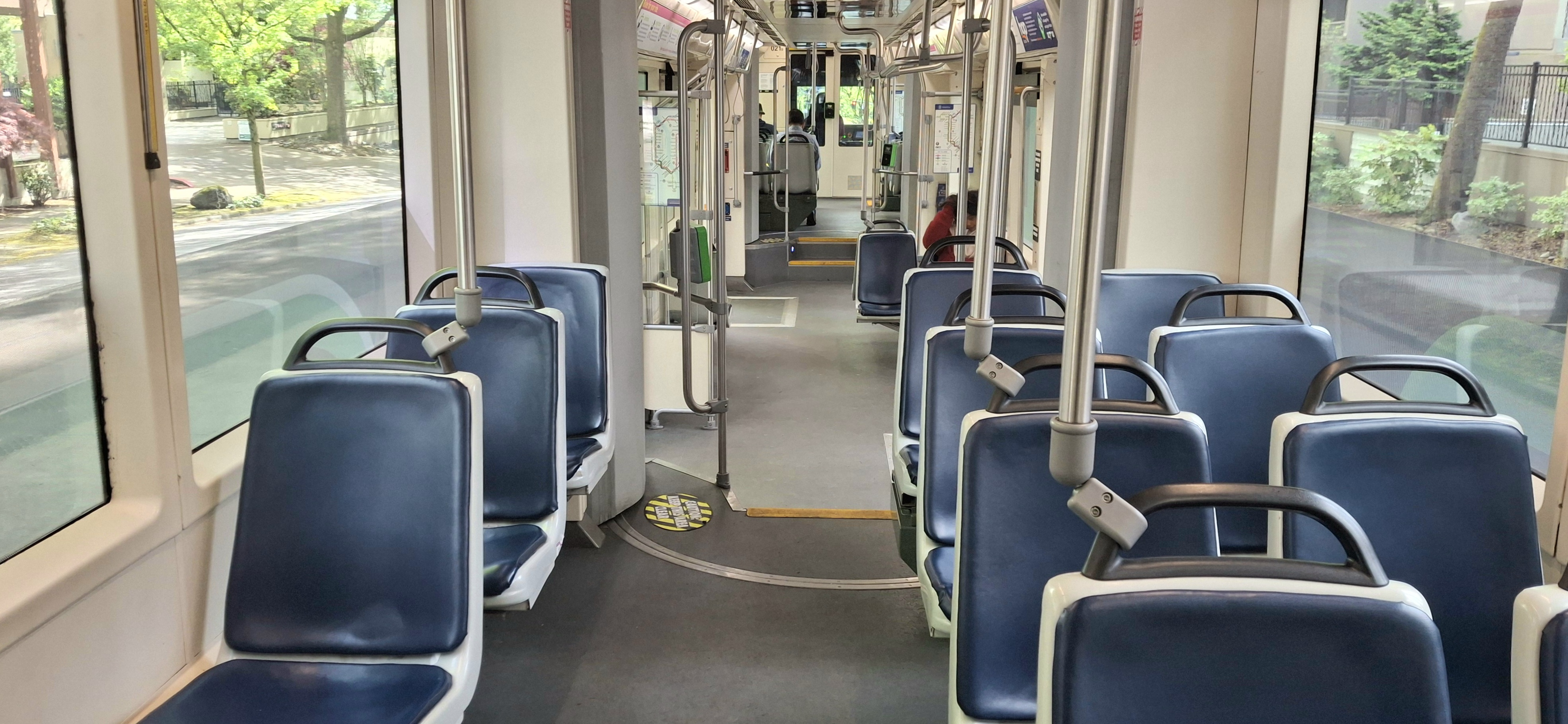
The interior of a Portland Streetcar United 100 streetcar

In spring 2009, the city of Portland announced that it had chosen United Streetcar for an order of six streetcars for a planned expansion of the Portland Streetcar system to the city's east side, and a $20 million contract for this order was signed in August 2009. In light of Portland's subsequent dissatisfaction with the Škoda propulsion system, the city decided in 2010 to modify the OIW/United Streetcar contract for these six cars, to substitute equipment from Elin EBG Traction for the originally planned Škoda equipment, which delayed their completion. The cars would receive motors supplied by Siemens, which has a U.S. factory, instead of by Škoda. In mid-2011, the order was reduced from six cars to five; purchase of a sixth car was reinstated in 2014. These were United Streetcar model "100". Delivery began in January 2013, and the first car entered service on June 11, 2013.

The City of Tucson signed a $26 million contract with United Streetcar on June 7, 2010, ordering seven streetcars for the Sun Link modern streetcar line that opened July 25, 2014. An eighth car was added to the order in 2012. The original announcement was made in May 2009, but the Tucson project was still awaiting FTA approval at that time. FTA approved the plans in late September 2009 and (jointly with the United States Department of Transportation) granted $69 million in early 2010 to help complete the project. The Tucson cars are model variant 200, the main difference from model 100 being a more powerful air-conditioning system. The first streetcar for Sun Link arrived in Tucson on August 30, 2013.

In April 2012, the District of Columbia Department of Transportation, in Washington, D.C., placed an order for two model 100 streetcars for use on the DC Streetcar's H Street/Benning Road line, under construction for opening in 2015, and the order was expanded to three cars in August 2012. The three cars were delivered between January 2014 and June 2014.

All three orders were completed in 2014, the last car being delivered to Portland in November of that year.

== Dissolution ==
The delays with the car deliveries, as well as teething issues experienced with the cars in service created tensions with the company's clients. In 2011, the company was working on a model 300 design that would have included the capability to operate away from the overhead wires, but it never reached production, and competitor Brookville Equipment Corporation completed such a design by 2013. As a relative newcomer to the market, with a single design offering, United Streetcar found it difficult to compete with more well-established builders such as Siemens and Bombardier. Consequently, the company received no further orders, and ceased production after the final car was delivered, mothballing its facilities in December 2014. United Streetcar president Kevin Clarke left the company that same month.

In February 2015, after United Streetcar had declined to produce an annual report, the Oregon Secretary of State's office acted to administratively dissolve the company, but formal dissolution did not take place until December 22, 2018. Parent Oregon Iron Works has re-purposed the U.S. facilities for boat construction, though the company has stated that they may return to rail-based equipment in the future (streetcars or otherwise).

== See also ==
- Electric Transit, Inc. – another joint venture between a US company and Škoda
- List of tram builders
- Streetcars in North America
- Škoda 03 T
- Škoda 10 T
- Škoda 15 T
