= Škoda 13 T =

Škoda 13 T Elektra
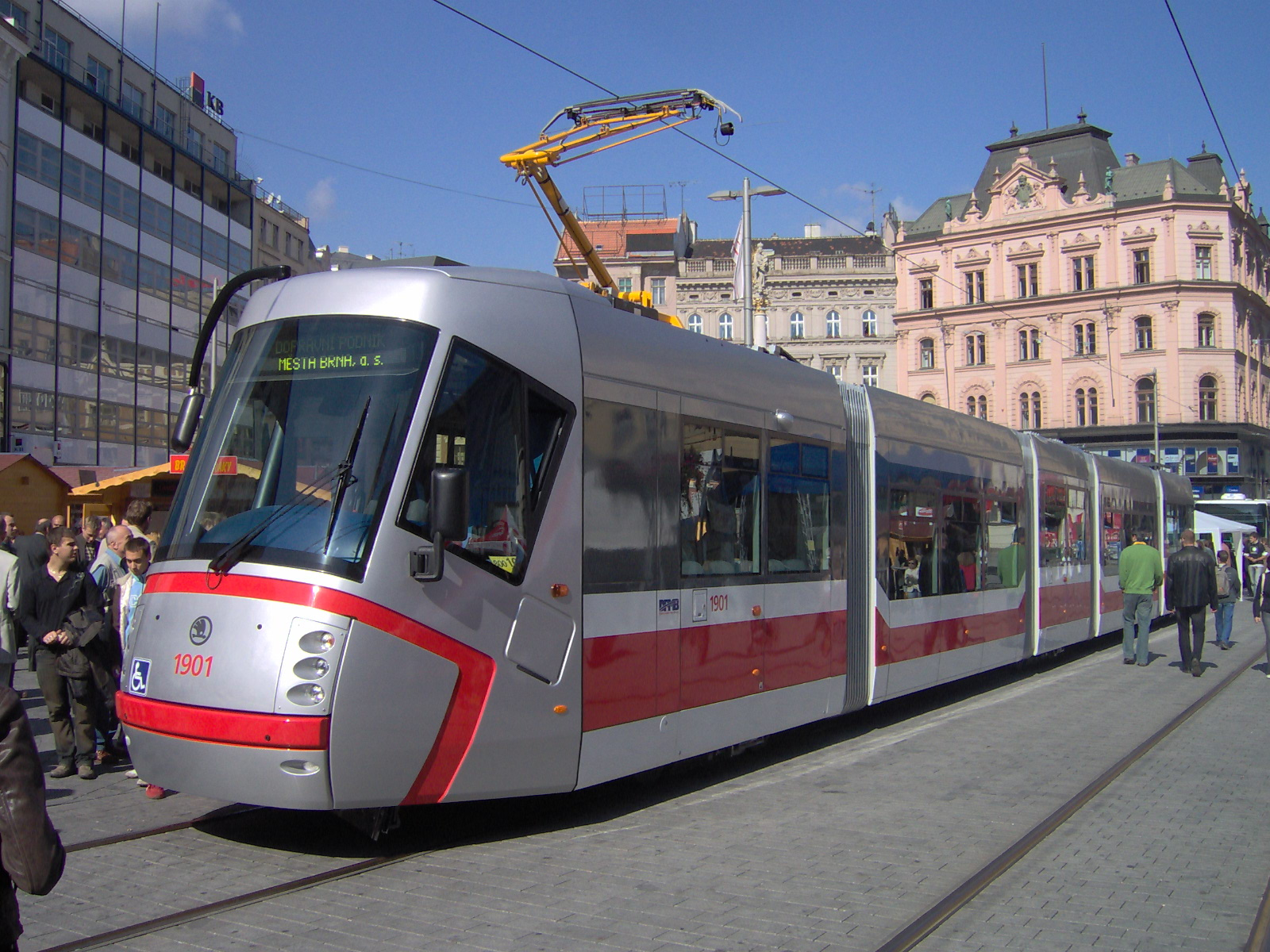
- First tram of this type in Brno, September 2007
- Manufacturer: Škoda Transportation
- Designer: Porsche Design Group
- Assembly: Plzeň, Czech Republic
- Family name: Škoda Elektra
- Constructed: 2007–2011, 2015–present
- Number built: 49
- Predecessor: Škoda 05 T Vektra
- Successor: Škoda 15 T ForCity
- Capacity: 68 (Seated); 201 (Standing)

Specifications
- Train length: 31,060 mm (101 ft 11 in)
- Width: 2,460 mm (8 ft 1 in)
- Height: 3,700 mm (12 ft 2 in)
- Floor height: 350 mm (13.78 in); 780 mm (30.71 in)
- Low-floor: 48%
- Doors: 4 double at low floor sections 2 single at ends of tram
- Articulated sections: 4 (5 body sections)
- Maximum speed: 70 km/h (43 mph)
- Weight: 38.3 t (37.7 long tons; 42.2 short tons)
- Steep gradient: 85 ‰ (8.5%) nominally, up to 99 ‰ (9.9%) in operation
- Power output: 540 kW (720 hp) (6 x 90 kW or 120 hp)
- Wheels driven: 100% (12/12)
- Bogies: 3 x fixed
- Minimum turning radius: 25 m (82 ft)/20 m (66 ft)
- Track gauge: 1,435 mm (4 ft 8 1/2 in)

The Škoda 13 T (also known as Škoda Elektra) is a five carbody section low-floor uni-directional tram, developed by Škoda Transportation for the Brno tram system.

The vehicle's front was designed by the Porsche Design Group. The 13 T has six axles, and the low-floor area represents 48% of the entire vehicle floor. It is based on the Škoda 14 T. While 14 T has a front door leading to the driver's cabin only, in the 13 T the front door leads to the passenger compartment.

== Deliveries ==
City	Year	Number of vehicles	Numbers	Note
Brno (Czech Republic)	2007; 2008; 2009; 2010; 2011; 2016	2; 4; 13; 4; 6; 20	1901,1902; 1903–1906; 1907–1919; 1920–1923; 1924–1929; 1930–1949	
TOTAL		49		

The vehicles delivered from late 2010 differ from the preceding ones in array of passenger seats – while the initial trams have the seats in high-floor sections sideways to the driving direction (so the passengers face each other with a passage in between the lines of seats), the newer trams have the seats located in the driving direction.

20 more trams were delivered in 2016.

== Gallery ==
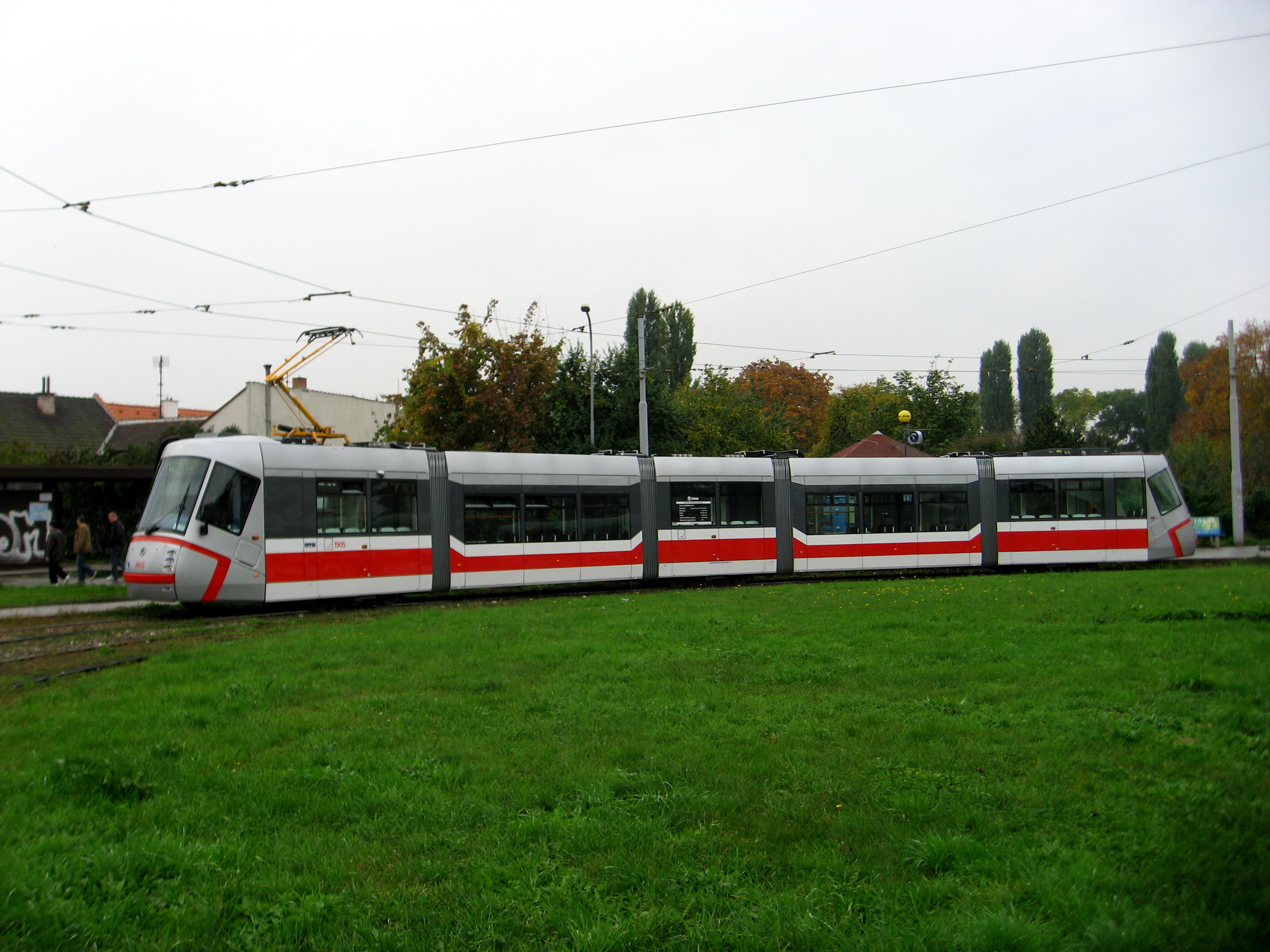

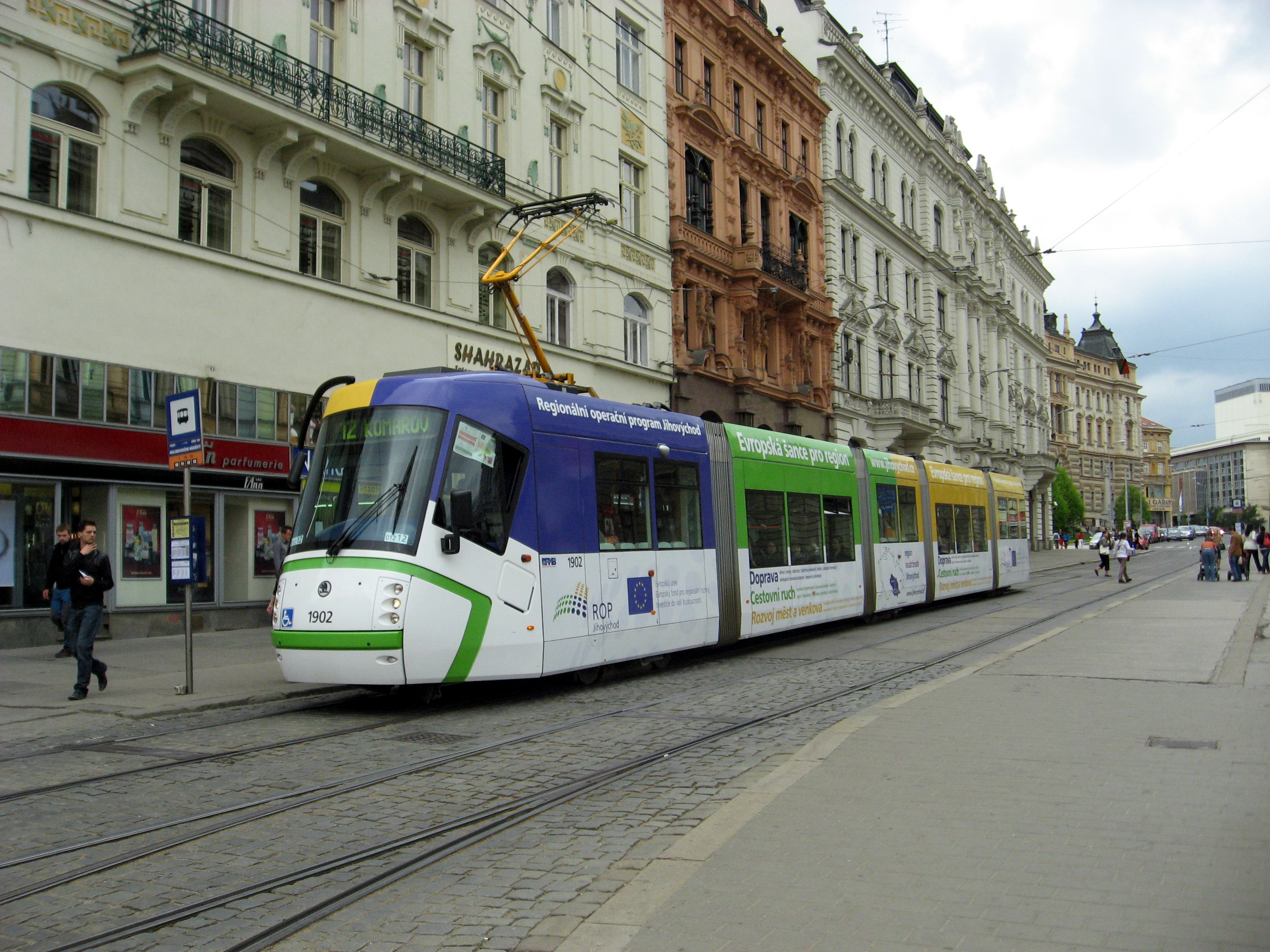
Škoda 13 T in an advertisement livery

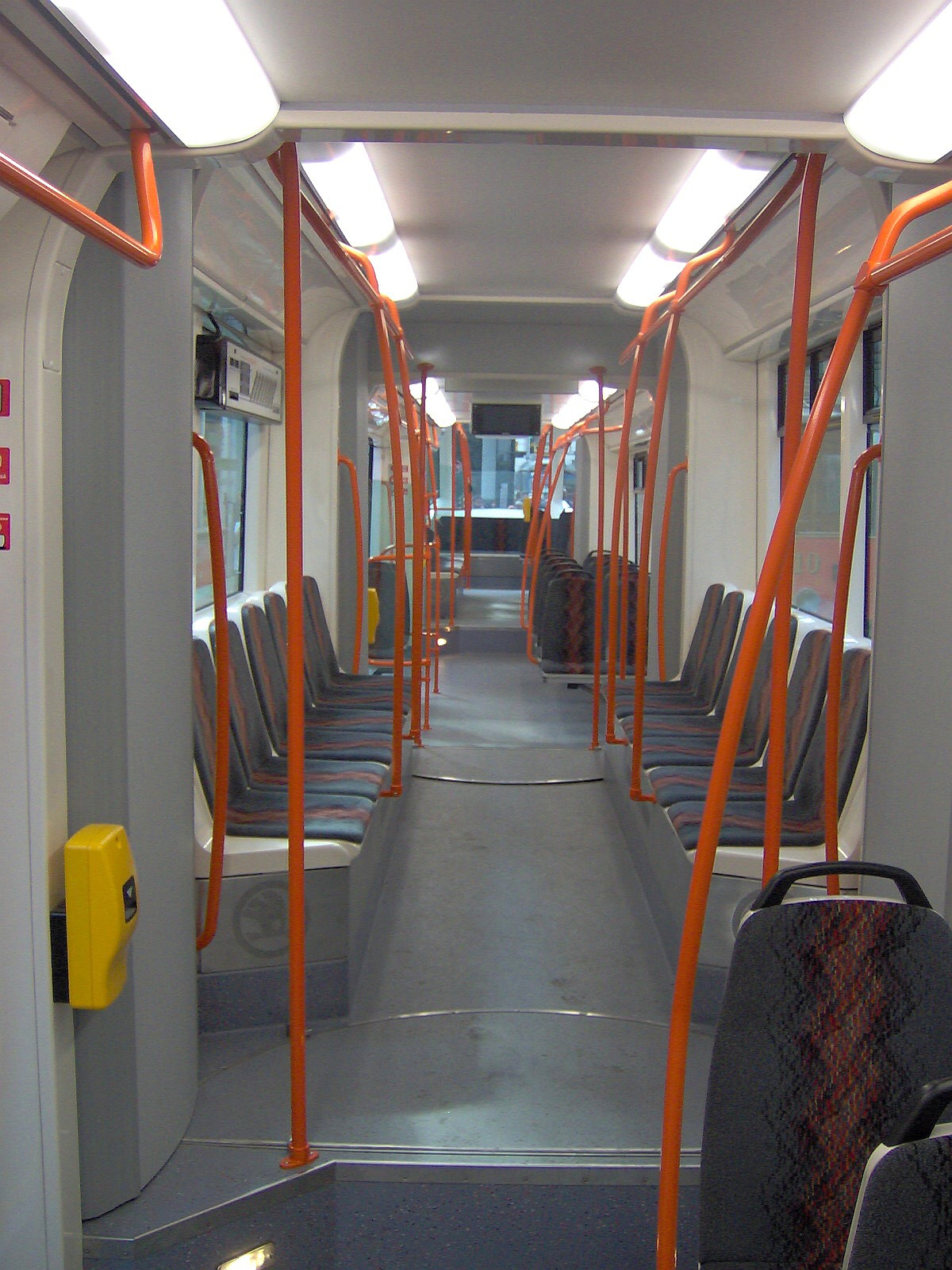
Interior of Škoda 13T

== See also ==
- Predecessor: Škoda 05 T – "Vektra"
- Successor: Škoda 15 T – "ForCity"
- Related "Elektra" models: 14 T (Prague), 16 T (Wroclaw uni-directional), 19 T (Wroclaw bi-directional)
