= Cagliari light rail =

Light rail system in Sardinia, Italy

Coordinates: 39.2167°N 9.1167°E

MetroCagliari
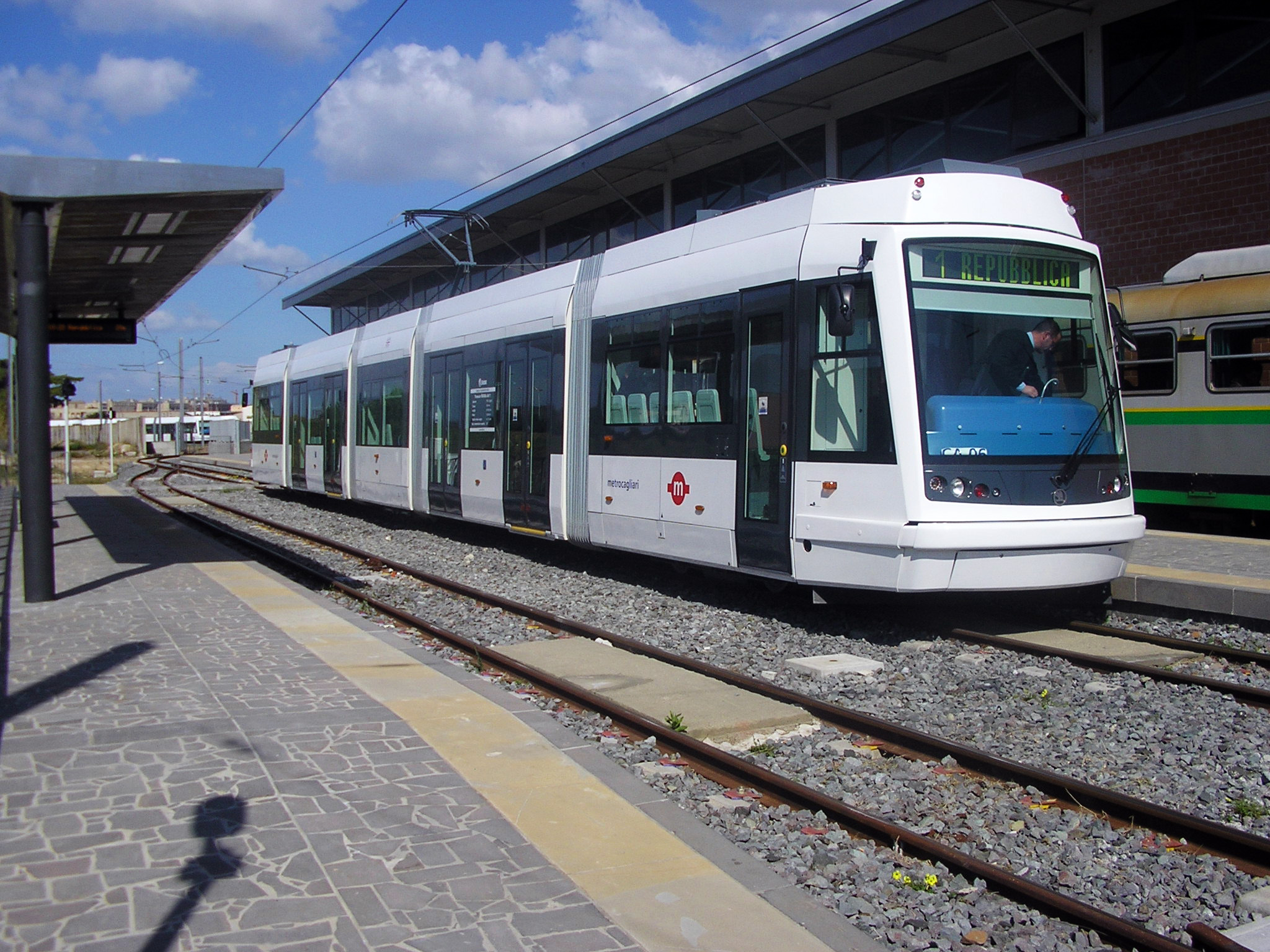
- A Škoda 06 T tram at Monserrato-San Gottardo station

Overview
- Locale: Cagliari, Italy
- Transit type: light rail
- Number of lines: 2
- Number of stations: 13

Operation
- Began operation: 17 March 2008
- Operator: ARST
- Number of vehicles: 9 Škoda 06 T, 3 CAF Urbos

Technical
- System length: 12 km
- Track gauge: 950 mm (3 ft 1 3/8 in)
- Electrification: 750 V DC
System map
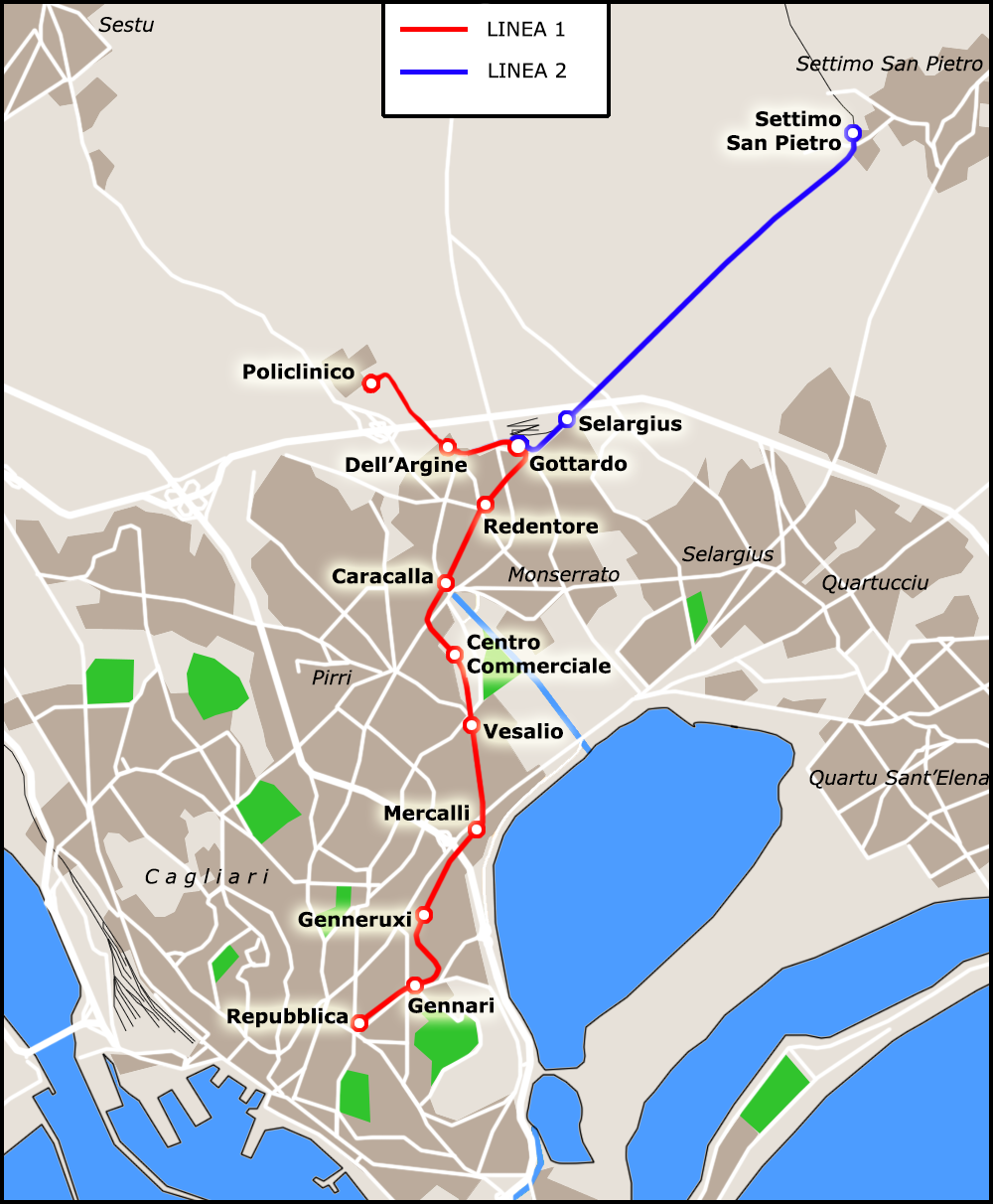
Metrocagliari map

The Cagliari light rail system, commercially known as MetroCagliari, is a two-line light rail system that serves the town of Cagliari and part of its metropolitan area, in Sardinia, Italy. The system was inaugurated in 2008 and has subsequently been expanded to two lines.

== History ==
The Cagliari light rail system was created through a rebuilding, electrification, and modernization of an urban-suburban section of a previously existing 950 mm (3 ft 1 3/8 in) gauge railway line operating out of Cagliari, owned by Ferrovie della Sardegna. The first stage involved rebuilding, as a light rail line, the 6.8-kilometre (4.2 mi) section between that line's Cagliari terminal station, at Piazza Repubblica, and Monserrato. The work included adding stations, installing overhead lines, and adding passing tracks in some locations along the single-track line. Once the construction was completed and the vehicles ready for use, a much greater frequency of service than existed previously on the line would be introduced, using the new trams and stops.

Construction began in June 2004 and was substantially completed in May 2007. A fleet of six Škoda 06 T trams was purchased, and they were delivered in 2007.

Service was inaugurated on 17 March 2008 on the initial route of 6.8 km (4.2 mi) between Piazza Repubblica, in Cagliari, and San Gottardo station, in Monserrato. The route had nine stations at that stage. An extension from Monserrato to Policlinico was already under construction at that time, but that project was not yet fully funded.

On 14 February 2015, line 1 was extended from San Gottardo to Policlinico (connecting to the University Hospital Policlinico di Monserrato), adding two stations and increasing the total number of stations to eleven.

The next extension opened less than two months later, and was another upgrading and electrification of an existing section of diesel railway line, from San Gottardo to Settimo San Pietro. Light rail service on that section began operation on 3 April 2015 and is designated as line 2. On 21 April 2018, an infill-station Selargius Camelie including Park and ride for about 100 cars was opened on this line.

Planned extension of the line into central Cagliari, from Piazza Repubblica to Piazza Matteotti and the Cagliari railway station of Rete Ferroviaria Italiana, was originally projected that the work may begin in 2017. This extension is very significant, because it will connect the tramway with the transportation hub of the city, home to the train and suburban buses station, and hub for local bus services. Due to several delays, work started officially in March 2021 and should have been finished in 2024, but was not yet. Within this project, the existing line Repubblica–Caracalla was upgraded by a second track and new signaling. Works on this have been completed in spring 2025 and tests started on 13 May 2025. It has not been announced yet, when the upgraded section or the extension will be opened.

Another extension is proposed to run from the new stop Lussu at Viala Armando Diaz on the city extension towards Piazza degli Arcipelaghi at the end of Viale Poetto.

== Fleet ==
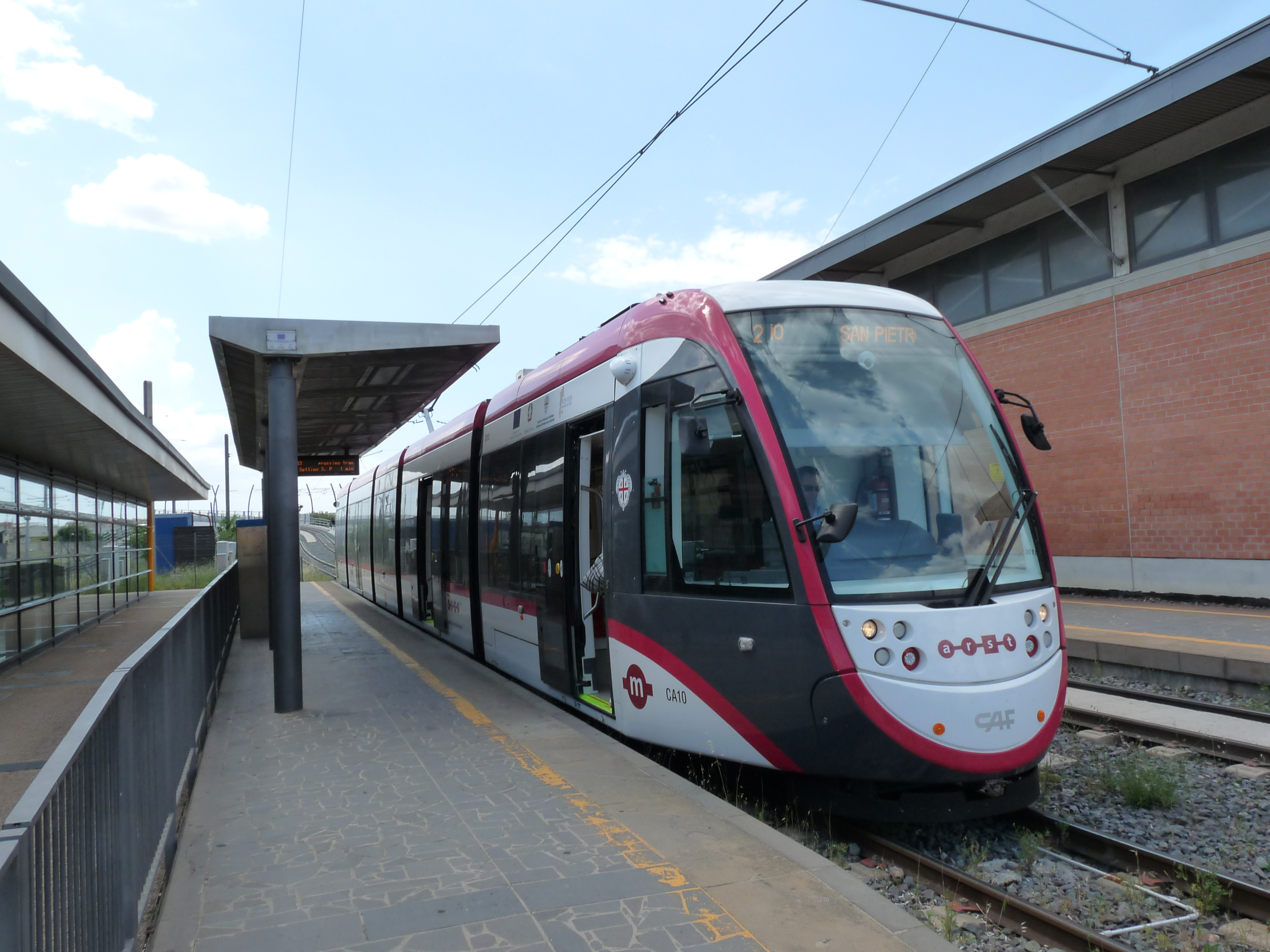
CAF tram 10 in service in June 2018

The initial fleet consisted of six Škoda 06 T trams, delivered in 2007. Three additional cars of the same type were acquired later.

A contract for the purchase of three more trams was awarded in 2013 to Construcciones y Auxiliar de Ferrocarriles (CAF), for a five-section, 32.9-metre-long Urbos 100 model of the Urbos 3 series. The CAF cars were delivered in November 2016 and during 2017, but delays were encountered in obtaining authorisation to place them in service. The three CAF Urbos trams finally entered service on 21 April 2018.

== Former tram system ==
Cagliari had a tram system from 1893 to 1973. At its maximum extent it had six lines.

== Gallery ==
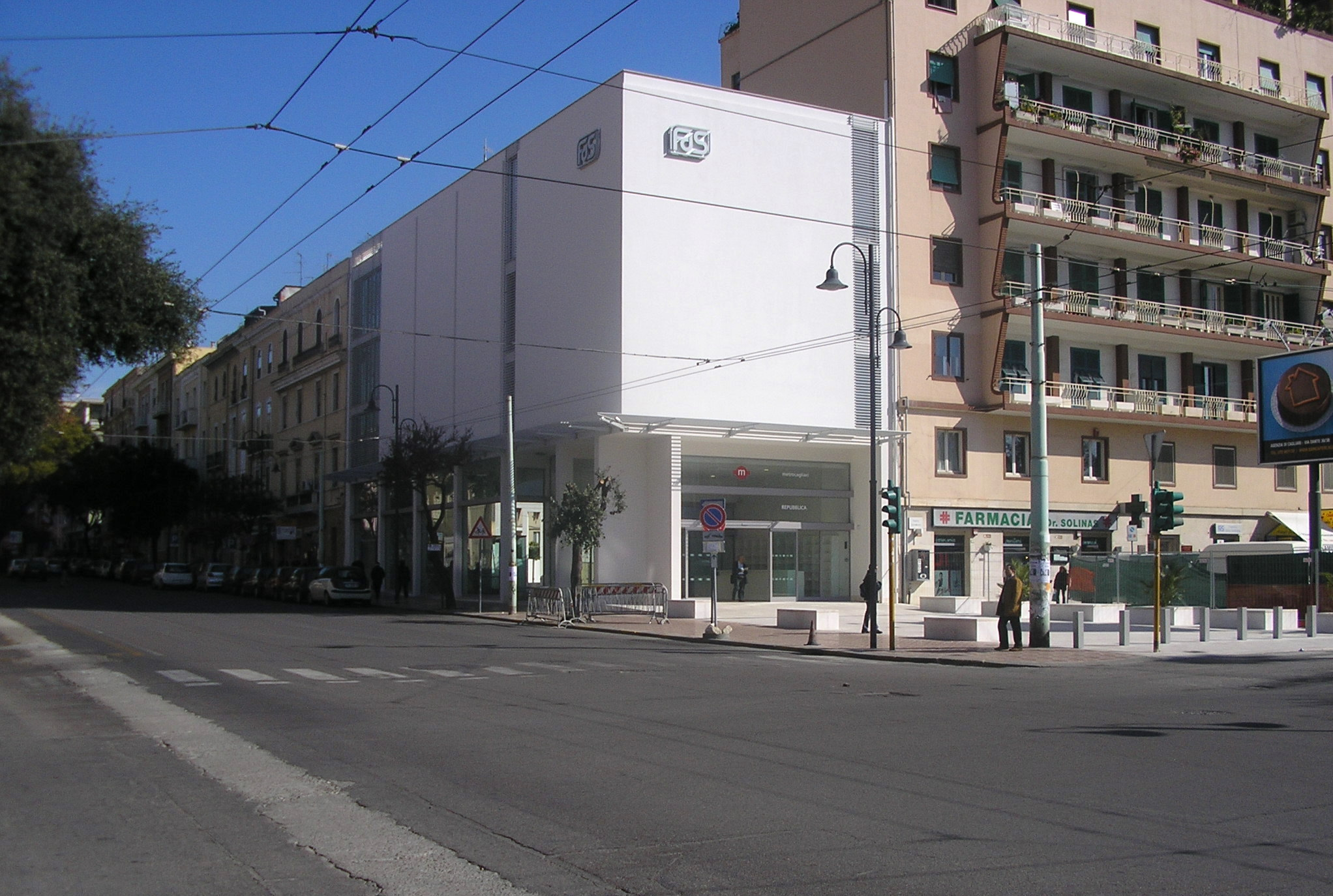
Exterior of the Cagliari terminus, the FdS station at Piazza Repubblica

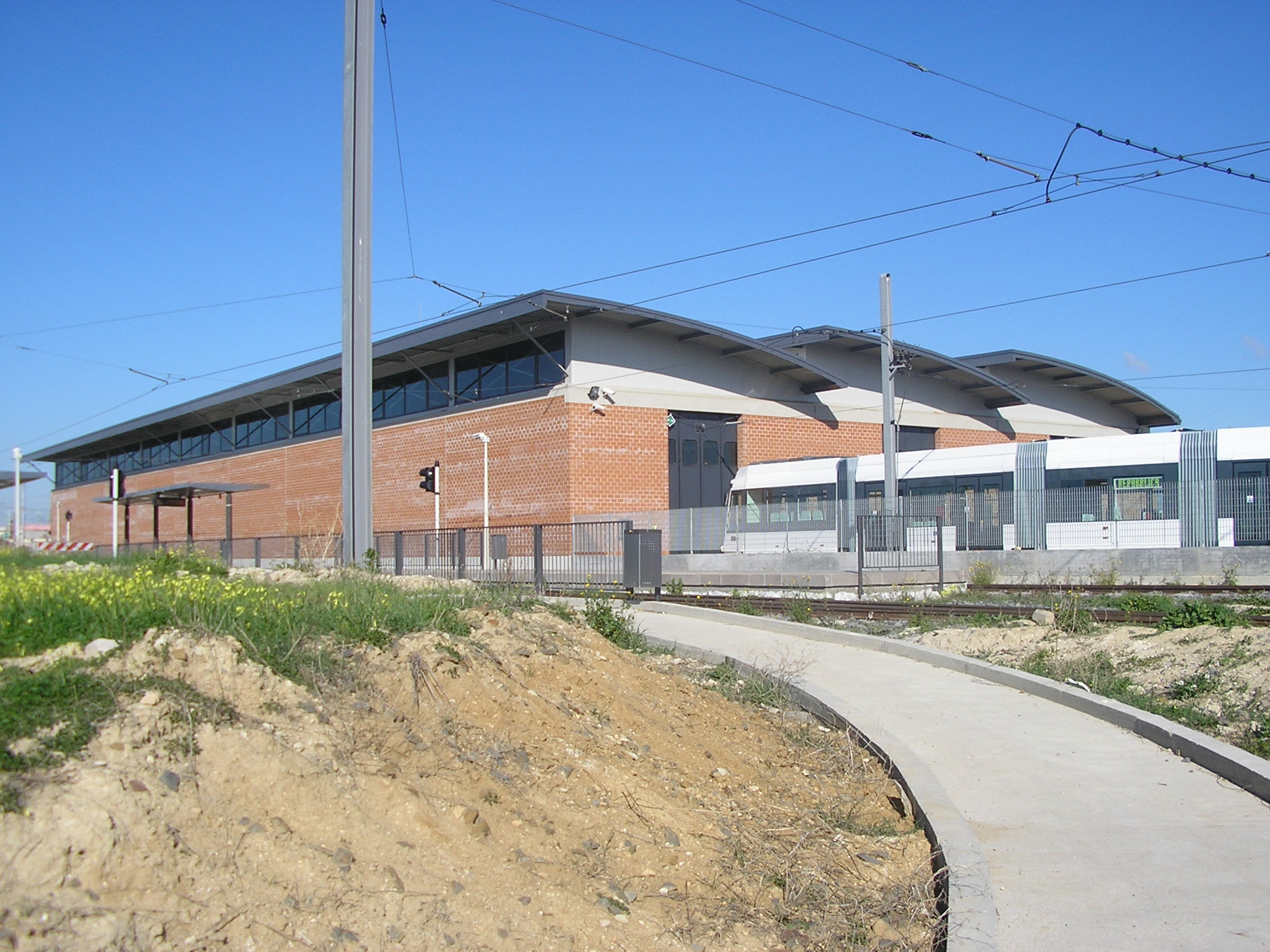
The system's maintenance facility, adjacent to the Monserrato-Gottardo station

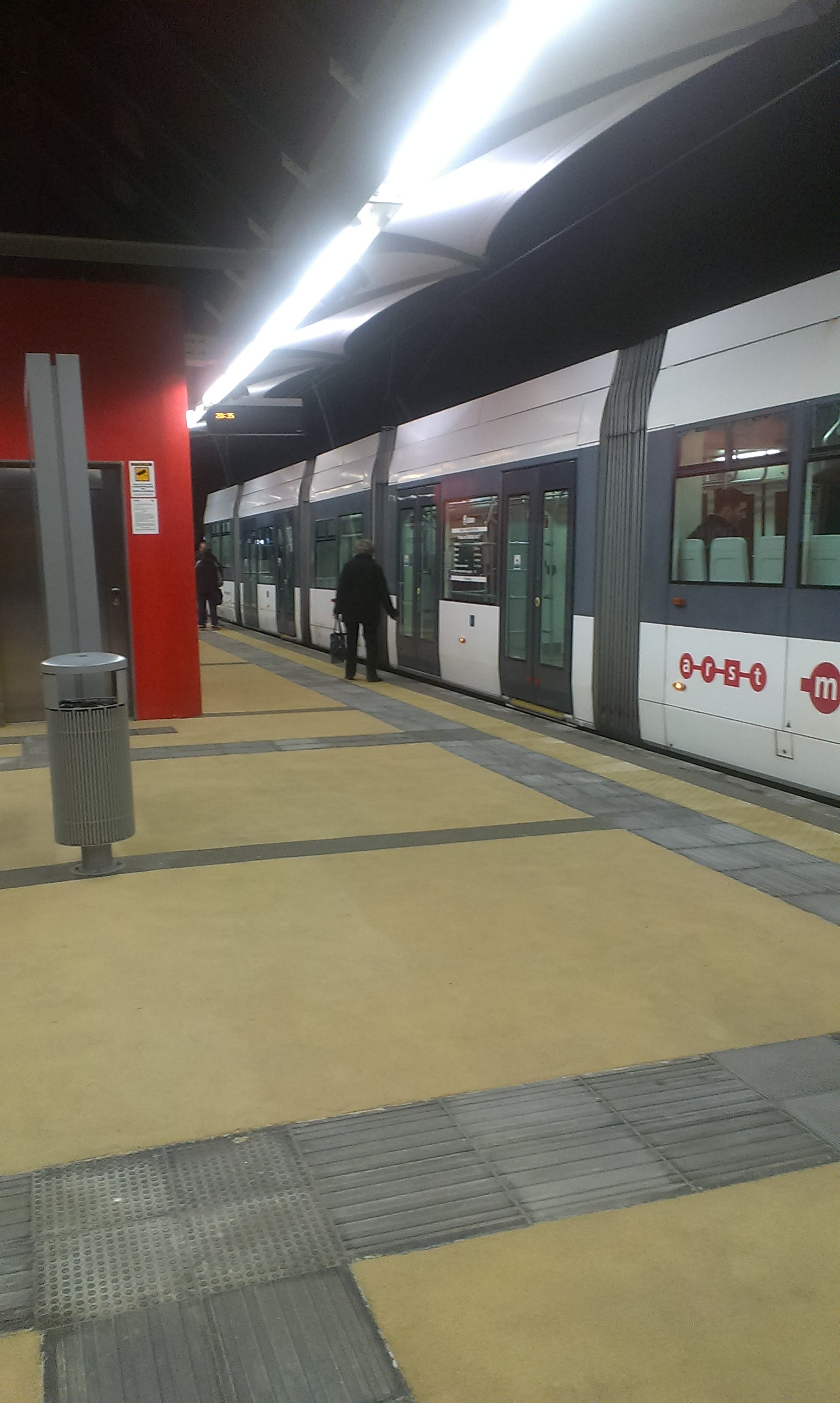
Policlinico station at night

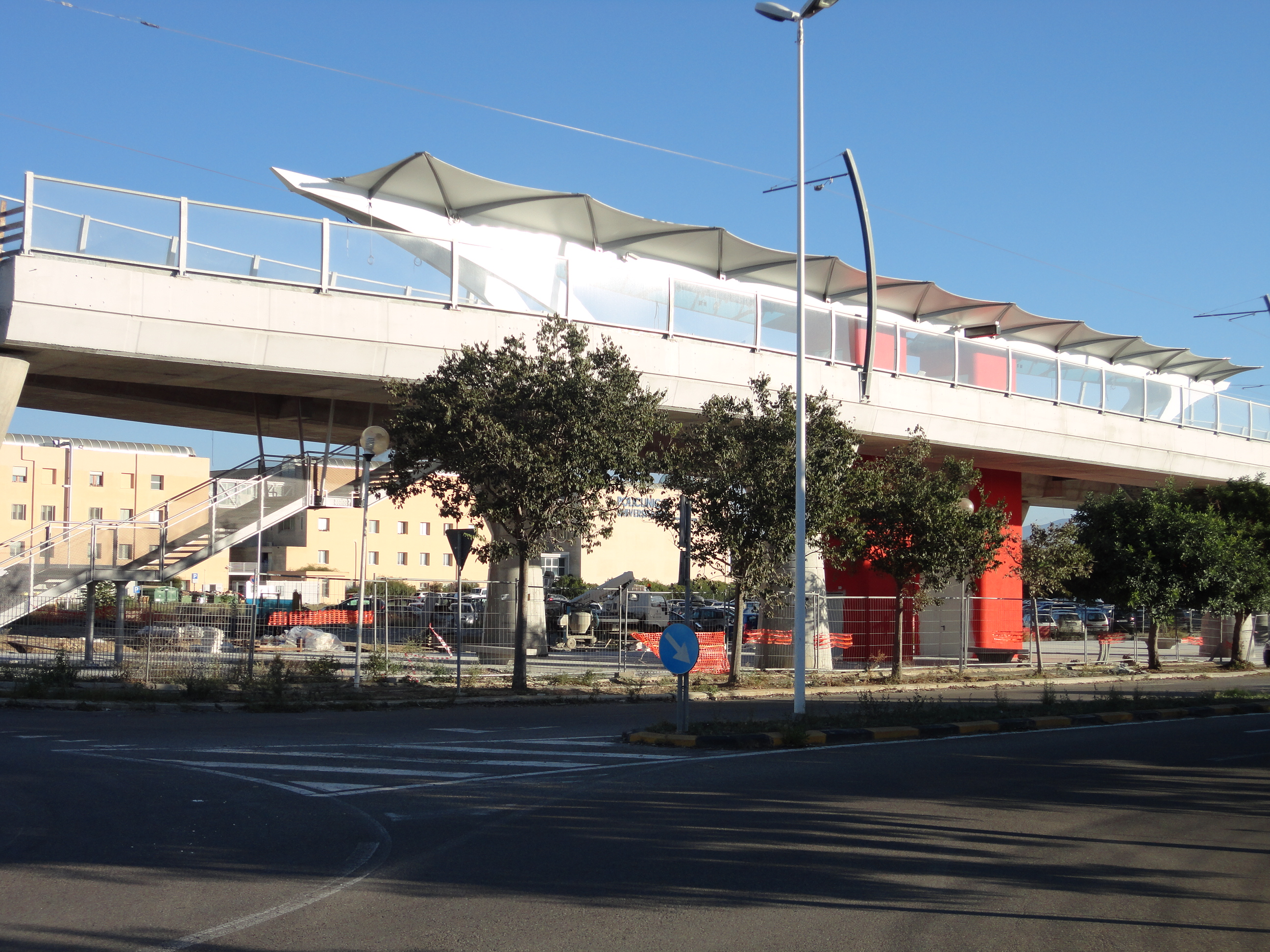
"Policlinico" tram station construction site, October 2013

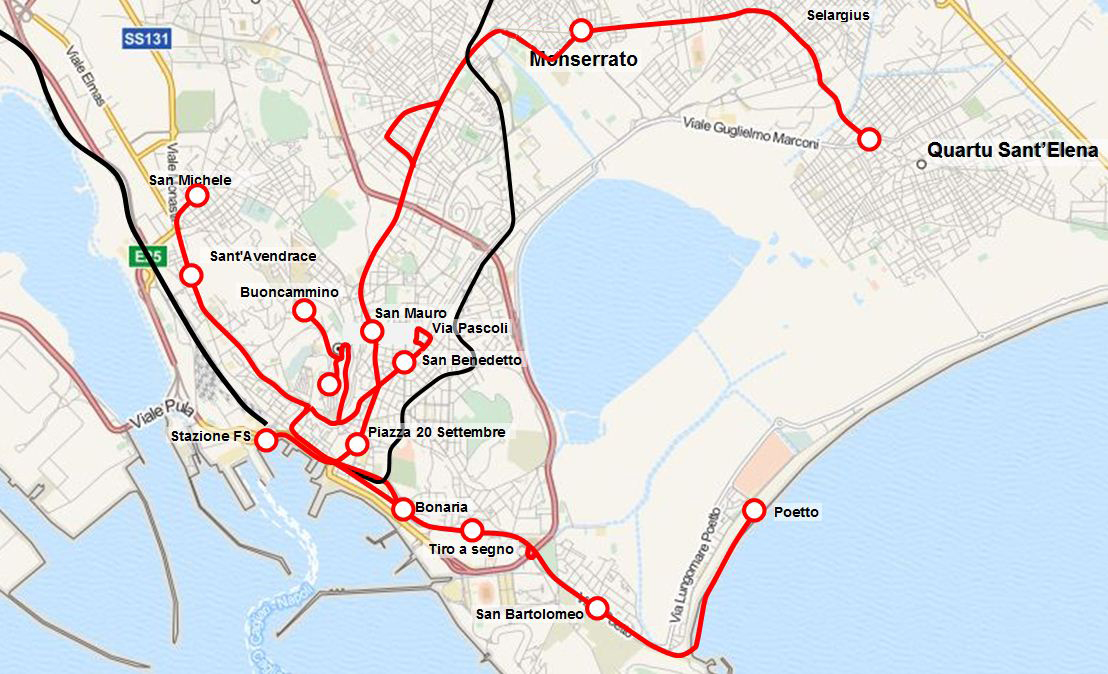
Cagliari tram map 1893-1973

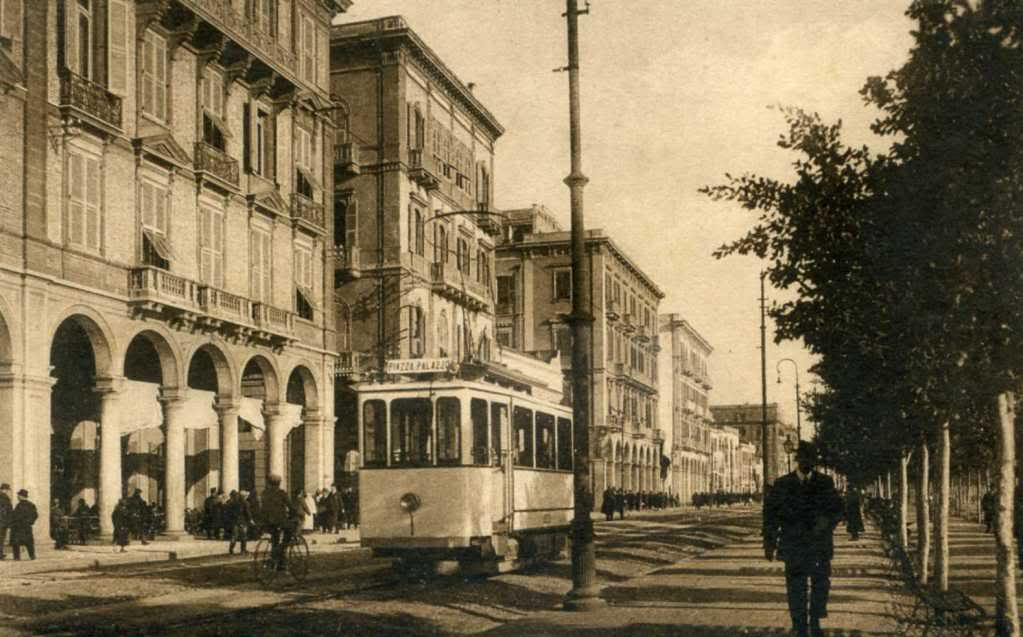
Cagliari, via Roma 1930- 1940 (north view)

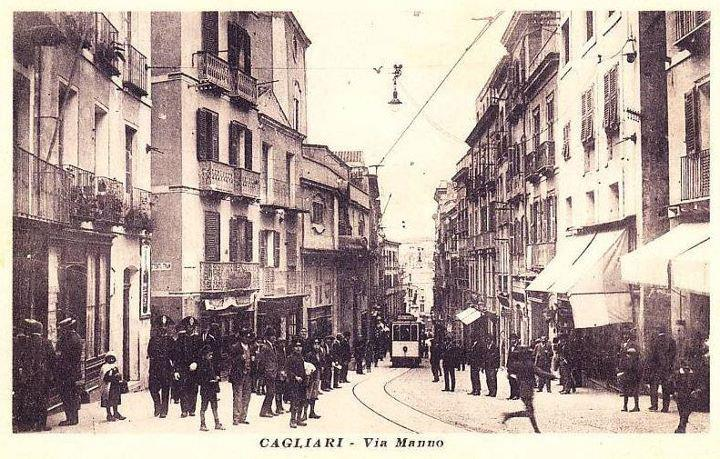
Via Manno, Cagliari

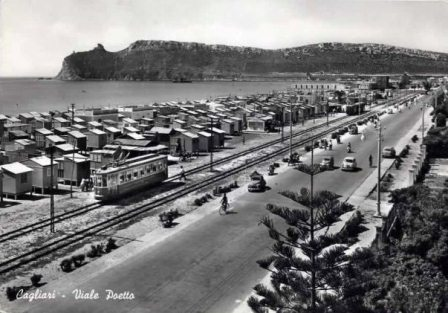
Cagliari - Tram to Poetto beach

== See also ==
- Trolleybuses in Cagliari
