= Škoda 06 T =

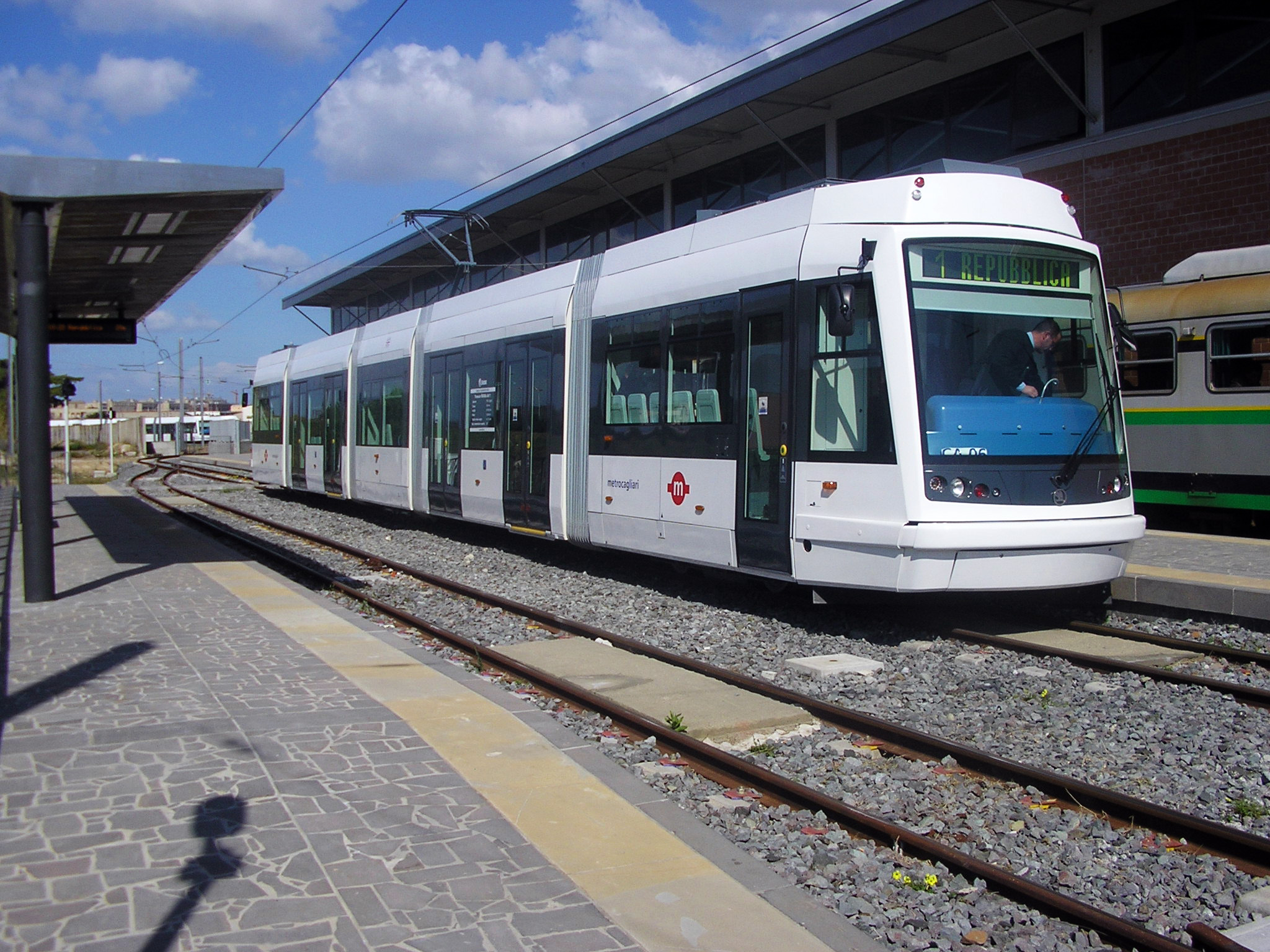
- Manufacturer: Škoda Transportation
- Assembly: Plzeň, Czech Republic
- Family name: Škoda Elektra
- Constructed: 2006–2007
- Number built: 9
- Predecessor: Škoda 05 T Vektra
- Successor: Škoda 15 T ForCity
- Capacity: 46 (Seated); 238 (Standing)

Specifications
- Train length: 29,490 mm (96 ft 9 in)
- Width: 2,460 mm (8 ft 1 in)
- Height: 3,500 mm (11 ft 6 in)
- Floor height: 350 mm (13.78 in); 620 mm (24.41 in)
- Low-floor: 65%
- Articulated sections: 4 (5 body sections)
- Maximum speed: 70 km/h (43 mph)
- Weight: 37.7 t (37.1 long tons; 41.6 short tons)
- Power output: 460 kW (620 hp) (4 × 115 kW or 154 hp)
- Track gauge: 950 mm (3 ft 1 3/8 in)

The Škoda 06 T is a five-carbody-section low-floor bi-directional tram, developed by Škoda for the Italian city of Cagliari.

The vehicle is six-axle and fully air-conditioned, and is based on the Škoda 05 T. The low-floor area represents 65% of the entire vehicle floor.

== Production ==
As of 2007, nine trams have been produced and delivered to the Cagliari light rail system.

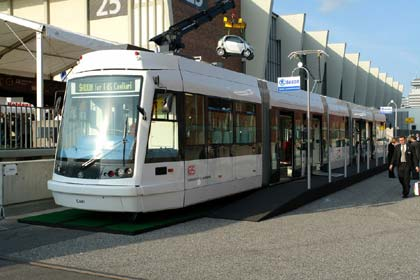
Škoda 06 T at InnoTrans 2006 in Berlin

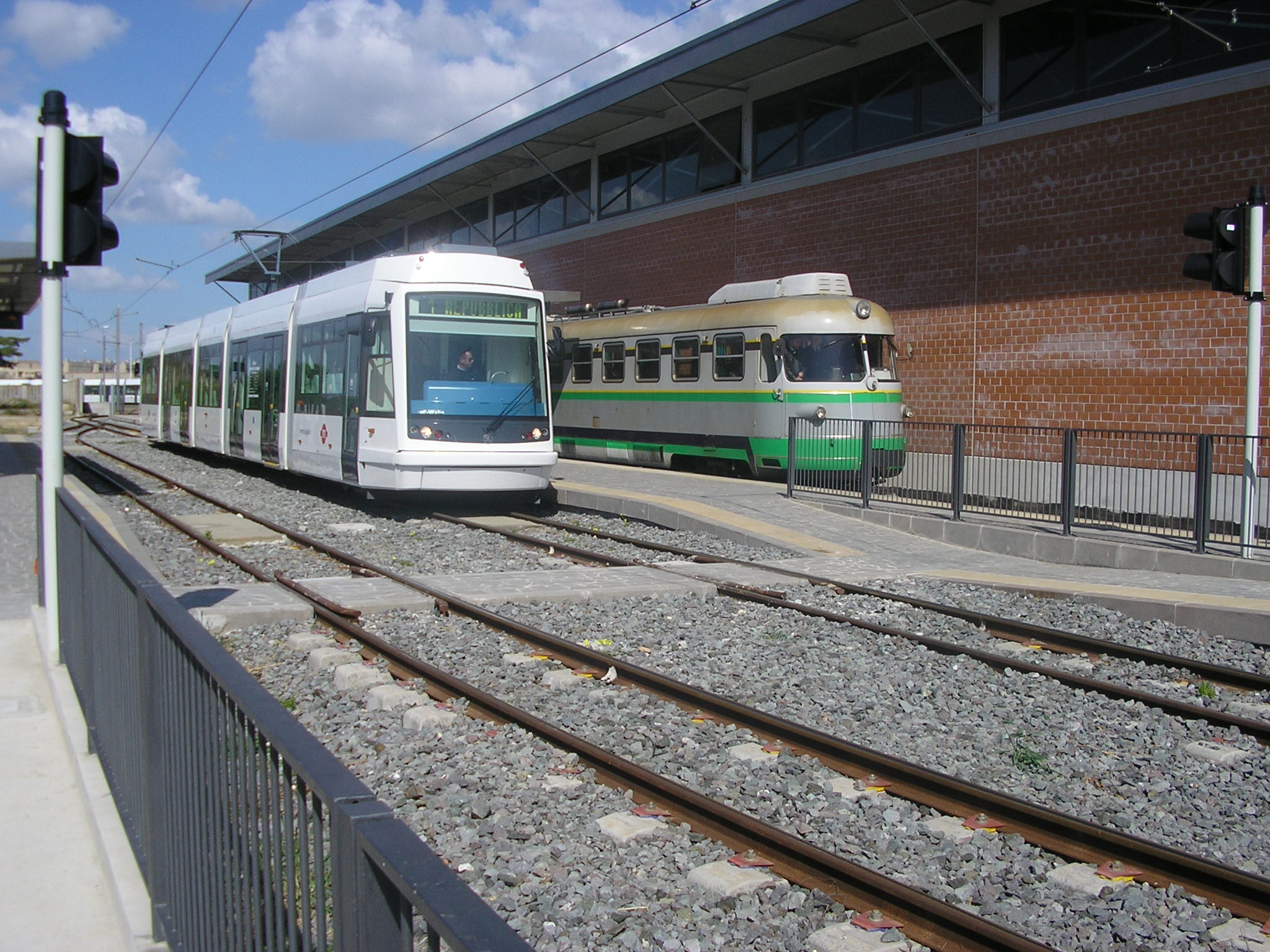
