= Antonín Koláček =

Czech manager and entrepreneur

- Born: 7 August 1959 (age 65); Přílepy (Kroměříž District), Czechoslovakia
- Citizenship: Czech Republic
- Occupation: Entrepreneur

Antonín Koláček (born 7 August 1959) is a former Czech entrepreneur. In 2008, he sold his shares in his companies and became an advocate and practitioner of buddhism. He was involved in the voucher privatization of Mostecká uhelná společnost (now Czech Coal); later he became its CEO.

== Early career ==
After his studies at the Institute of Chemical Technology in Prague, he worked as a personalist for a Prague chocolate factory (1983-1990) and since 1990 for Komerční banka. Between 1993 and 1997 he was also a member of the supervisory board (non-executive) of Komerční banka.

In 1994, he founded (together with Petr Kraus) Newton Financial Management Group, a company that focused on trading on financial markets and related advisory services. In 1995, he became a member of the board of directors (executive board) of Czech Coal Group as the chief personalist of Komerční banka, which hold shares of MUS (Mostecká uhelná společnost). He became the most influential manager of MUS, and the CEO of Appian Group, which took control over MUS in 1998. In 2005 he bought 40% share of Appian Group (Luboš Měkota obtained another 40%); both their shares were bought in 2005/2006 by Pavel Tykač.

== MUS case ==
For more than one decade, Czech police has been investigating him in relation with MUS and Appian Group. In Switzerland, Koláček was accused together with his former partners Jiří Diviš, Petr Kraus, Marek Čmejla and Jacques de Groote, In 2013, he was sentenced for fraud, money laundering and other crimes in connection with MUS and Appian Group to 52 months in jail, with an appeal being prepared.

== Other activities ==
From 1999 to 2004, Koláček acted as the CEO of the newly created University of Finance and Administration. He founded MAITREA in 2006, a center for spiritual and personal development in Říčany. In 2008, Koláček sold his shares in his companies and became and advocate and practitioner of buddhism.
