= Trolleybuses in Kabul =

Kabul trolleybus system (1979–1992)

Kabul trolleybus system

Operation
- Locale: Kabul, Afghanistan
- Open: February 9, 1979
- Close: 1992
- Status: Closed
- Routes: 3
- Operator: Millie Bus

Infrastructure
- Electrification: V DC Parallel overhead lines
- Depot: Silo
- Stock: 86 Škoda 9Tr

Statistics
- Route length: 12.5 km (7.8 mi)

The Kabul trolleybus system was a public transport service in Kabul, the capital and largest city of Afghanistan. The system was built by the Czechoslovak Elektrizace železnic Praha (Electrification of railways, Prague) from 1976. The service launched on February 9, 1979, with 25 Škoda 9TrH23 trolleybuses, eventually expanding to 86 vehicles by 1988, of which 80 were in operation. Operated by the state-owned Millie Bus, it used the same branding and a light-blue and white livery.

The initial line built by the Czechoslovak company ran between Pamir Cinema in downtown Kabul to Silo Road (Kote Sangi) in western Kabul, via Kabul Zoo, Karte Char and Kabul University. Subsequently, the Afghans themselves extended the line from Silo Road northwards back to downtown at Spinzar Hotel in Deh Afghanan. The line was also extended in the other direction, via Jadayi Maiwand to a textile factory located to the north-east. The total length of the system was 12.5 km (7.8 mi). The line was intentionally split into three routes with transfer points. The routes were distinguished only by destinations and not by numbers.

The trolleybus service was highly popular due to its low price compared to the regular bus service of Millie Bus. It carried about 21 million passengers per year. However its overhead line and electric contact network was reportedly in bad condition by the late 1980s with poor maintenance. Following the outbreak of civil war, the last trolleybus came to a halt in late 1992. The copper overhead wires were subsequently looted and sold to scrap dealers. The steel poles and some of the overhead can still be seen in Kabul today.

In 2003 and 2004, there were plans for a resurrected trolleybus service to ease congestion. Its revival was discussed with Czech officials in 2011 and again with an Indian delegation in 2017. The Kabul Times reported in 2013 that the government was committed to renovating the system to tackle air pollution and deal with the busy traffic and increasing population in the city. In 2017, a new bus rapid transit system was revealed, which would be Kabul's first public transport system since the trolleybuses and which will run on much of the roads that were once served by trolleybuses.

== Fleet ==
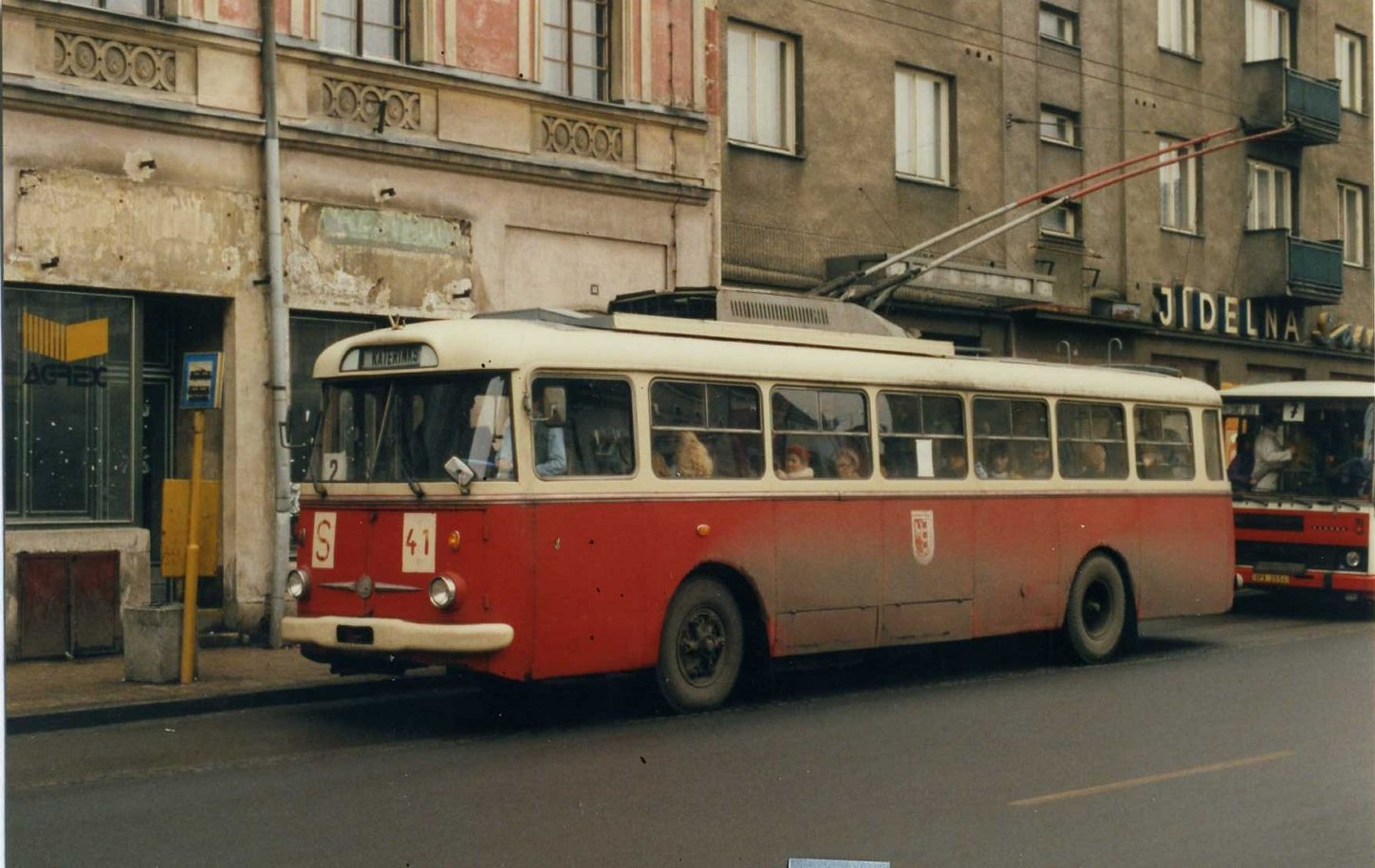
A Skoda 9Tr in Czechoslovakia, the same type that was used in Kabul

The Škoda 9TrH23 is a variant of the 9Tr, produced from 1961 to 1982. It was one of the most popular models used in the former Soviet Union. The model in Kabul had three doors and operated on an overhead line voltage of between 550 and 600 volts.

== See also ==
- List of trolleybus systems
- Millie Bus
