= Kabul bus rapid transit =

Transit system in Kabul

Kabul bus rapid transit is a bus rapid transit (BRT) system in Kabul, Afghanistan, currently under construction.

== History ==
A bus rapid transit system in the city of Kabul was envisaged since 2009 to relieve pressure on motor traffic in the fast-urbanizing city. Kabul Municipality, the Ministry of Transport, and the Japan Cooperation Agency in Afghanistan (JICA) held a joint international conference in New York City in 2016 to research and discuss a potential system. The BRT system was officially unveiled by Kabul Municipality in June 2017, which has also been referred to as Metrobus. Officials said that construction would start soon and that the system's first phase would be opened in 2018. It was reported in July 2018 that the project had been hampered by delays, and as of January 2019 it is still not yet completed.

The project will cost $15 million to be built, paid for by the municipality. It is also part of the wider Asian Development Bank's 20-year urban investment program in Afghanistan.

== Infrastructure ==
The BRT's bus lanes would have a width of 60 metres (200 ft). There will also be specialized pedestrian crosswalks and overpasses at BRT stops.

== Route ==
Construction of the BRT system is split into four phases, all serving the city's main downtown district:

- Phase I: Deh Afghanan – Salang Watt Road (Baraki Square) – Sara-e Shamali
- Phase II: Baraki Square – Karte Parwan – Silo Road – Kote Sangi – Sevom Aqrab Road (Deh Mazang) – Deh Afghanan
- Phase III: Deh Afghanan – Maidan Square – Sara-e Shamali
- Phase IV: Deh Afghanan – Jadayi Maiwand – Karte Naw – Arzan Qimat

With additional extensions it is expected to be 111 km long by 2020 including serving Dashte Barchi and Darulaman.

== See also ==
- Millie Bus
- Trolleybuses in Kabul
