= Škoda Transportation =

Czech transport engineering company

Škoda Transportation a.s.
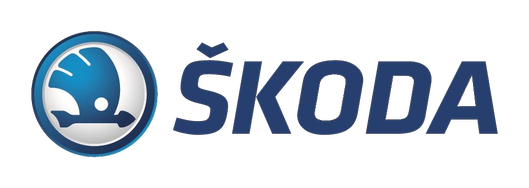
- Type: Joint-stock company
- Industry: Transport engineering
- Predecessor: Škoda Works
- Founded: February 23, 1995; 31 years ago
- Headquarters: Plzeň, Czech Republic
- Area served: Worldwide
- Key people: Petr Novotný (CEO and chairman of the board); Tomáš Ignačák (deputy chairman of the board)
- Products: Electric locomotives Multiple units Low-floor trams Metro trains Trolleybuses; Battery electric buses Hydrogen buses Traction and control systems
- Revenue: ▲CZK 29.37 billion (2025)
- Operating income: ▲CZK 1.56 billion (2025)
- Net income: ▲CZK 726.7 million (2025)
- Total assets: CZK 33.79 billion (2025)
- Total equity: CZK 11.38 billion (2025)
- Owner: PPF Group
- Number of employees: 6,720 (2025)
- Parent: Škoda a.s.
- Subsidiaries: See list
- Website: skodagroup.com

Škoda Transportation a.s. is a Czech manufacturer of rolling stock and vehicles for public transport, headquartered in Plzeň. Its products include trams, electric multiple units, metro trains and trolleybuses. Its modern rolling-stock families include the ForCity trams and RegioPanter electric multiple units.

The company originated from the transportation-engineering operations of Škoda Works in Plzeň in 1920. Following the privatization and restructuring after the Velvet Revolution, the current company was established in 1995. It was formerly part of the same conglomerate as Škoda Auto and Doosan Škoda Power.

Škoda Transportation has been owned by PPF Group since 2018.

== History ==
The company was entered into the Commercial Register on 1 March 1995 as Škoda Dopravni Technika s. r. o., operating under the name Škoda Transportation s.r.o. from 10 December 2004 and since 1 April 2009 in its current legal form as a joint stock company. Between 1995 and 2001, Škoda Transportation was owned by ŠKODA a. s. (Company ID No. 00213101) and then from 2003 on by ŠKODA HOLDING a. s. (Company ID No. 26163632, formerly Divide et impera a.s.). In 2006 Škoda Holding was dissolved through merger by acquisition with HQU International, a.s. (Company ID No. 26502399), which was later renamed Škoda Holding (and subsequently renamed ŠKODA INVESTMENT a.s. in 2010).

In 2003, the parent company Škoda Holding was purchased by Appian Group, a company based in the Netherlands with an unclear ownership structure. They initiated restructuring of the company with the aim of focusing on only two main fields of production - conventional power generation and transportation engineering. In 2004, Škoda JS, Škoda Kovárny and Škoda Hutě were sold off, followed in 2009 by Škoda Power, leaving Škoda Holding nothing more than an empty shell. Škoda Transportation itself acquired several companies in the transport sector and established itself as the main pillar of the group, drawing up consolidated financial statements for the first time in 2010 and achieving consolidated sales of CZK 12.1 billion.

In 2010, ŠKODA HOLDING a.s. (Company ID No. 28423518, formerly BTY Czech, a.s.) became the owner of Škoda Transportation, followed in 2011 by SKODA INDUSTRY (EUROPE) with registered office in Cyprus, which was renamed CEIL (CENTRAL EUROPE INDUSTRIES) LTD in 2013. In November 2017, PPF Group signed a contract to acquire a 100 % stake in Škoda Transportation and other assets, among others the Škoda registered trademark. The final price was made public in June 2018 and amounted to € 326 million, which is the equivalent of CZK 8.3 billion using the exchange rate in April 2018.

In June 2022, the parent group PPF announced that it had sold the rights to the Škoda logo and brand to Škoda Auto, whereas the Plzeň-based company is allowed to use the current name under licence until 2029. The news portal Seznam Zprávy reported in December 2023 that, according to Škoda Transportation’s annual report and information from other sources, it concluded that the undisclosed purchase price for the Škoda logo and brand was at least CZK 4 billion.

	2010	2011	2012	2013	2014	2015	2016	2017	2018	2019	2020	2021	2022
assets(bil. Kč)	26,1	25,7	24,9	24,4	23,9	23,9	23,0	23,6	23,2	24,2	27,5	25,8	35,3
revenue (bil. Kč)	12,1	15,7	15,3	14,6	16,4	18,3	17,7	11,8	11,6	11,3	9,7	11,1	15,2
EBIT (bil. Kč)	3,9	4,1	3,8	2,1	3,2	1,8	2,3	0,9	3,9	0,4	0,3	1,1	1,2
net income (bil. Kč)	3,3	3,4	3,1	1,8	2,3	0,6	1,6	0,3	0,3	-0,4	-1,4	0,6	3,5
dividend paid (bil. Kč)	4,5	6,2	2,9	3,0	1,5	5,0	1,2	0 (Note: Shareholder provided a premium outside equity of CZK 4.2 billion)	0	0	0	0	1,5

== Owners ==
In April 2010, ŠKODA HOLDING a.s. (Company ID No. 28423518, formerly BTY Czech, a.s.) became the owner of Škoda Transportation. On 20 September 2010, it was announced that Škoda Transportation had been sold by Appian Group to four individuals, these being two managers from Appian (Marek Čmejla and Jiří Diviš) and two managers from Škoda Holding (Tomáš Krsek and Michal Korecký). The likely new owners announced that they were considering listing the company’s shares on the stock exchange. According to some media reports, this was merely a formality, as these owners had long controlled the Appian Group subsidiary. In November 2011, Jaromír Šilhánek, director of the subsidiary Škoda Electric, joined the ranks of the shareholders, and the company acquired three more shareholders in 2012. The first was Josef Bernard, who started at Škoda as a technician and later became the director of Škoda Transportation, and the other two were Marek Krsek and Tomáš Ignačák, associated mainly with Pars nova. Michal Kurtinec became the ninth shareholder in 2014. In January 2015, Josef Bernard was replaced by Tomáš Ignačák. Petr Brzezina was appointed CEO after takeover of the company by PPF Group.

From March 2011, the sole shareholder of Škoda Transportation entered in the Commercial Register was Skoda Industry (Europe) which was supposed to have been controlled by the above-mentioned owners. It was, however, owned by Maranex Finance, a company registered in the Marshall Islands and Conitor Terra, a company registered in Guernsey. Skoda Industry (Europe) was renamed CEIL (Central Europe Industries) in 2013. Škoda Transportation paid dividends totalling over CZK 16 billion to its unknown owners between 2010 and 2013. In 2015, 98.75 % of the shares of the sole shareholder were indirectly held by Tomáš Krsek, Michal Korecký, Marek Čmejla and Jiří Diviš. The company has several long-term loan agreements with its sole shareholder and in 2015, the company owed this shareholder CZK 2 billion at an interest rate of 10 % p. a.

Chinese rolling stock manufacturer CRRC Zhuzhou Locomotive (中车株洲电力机车有限公司), a subsidiary of the Chinese CRRC Corporation Limited (中国中车股份有限公司), was interested in purchasing Škoda Transportation for a long time. According to the then Minister of Industry Jan Mládek, this potential buyer demanded a guarantee that the privatisation of Škoda Transportation had been performed in an incontestable manner, which he refused to provide. Later, Siemens made a bid for Škoda Transportation and there was speculation that the Energetický a průmyslový holding group was interested in buying it. The contract for purchase of shares in Škoda Transportation and related assets was in the end concluded by PPF Group in November 2017. The transaction was finalised in April 2018 for a total amount of EUR 326 million. On 7 May 2019, PPF Group announced that it had sold its 10 % stake in Škoda Transportation. The price was not disclosed.

== Products ==
=== Trams ===
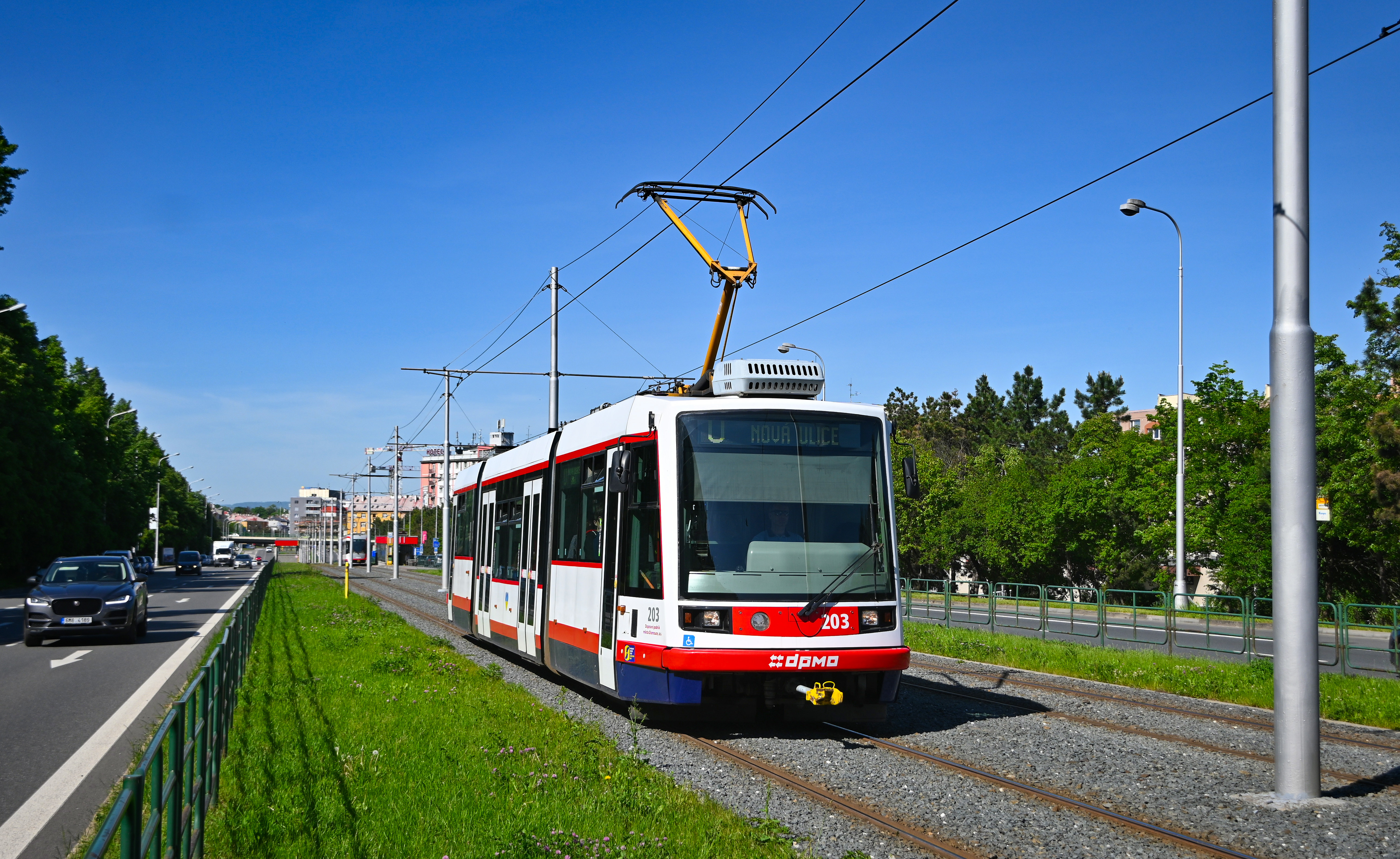
Škoda 03T in Olomouc

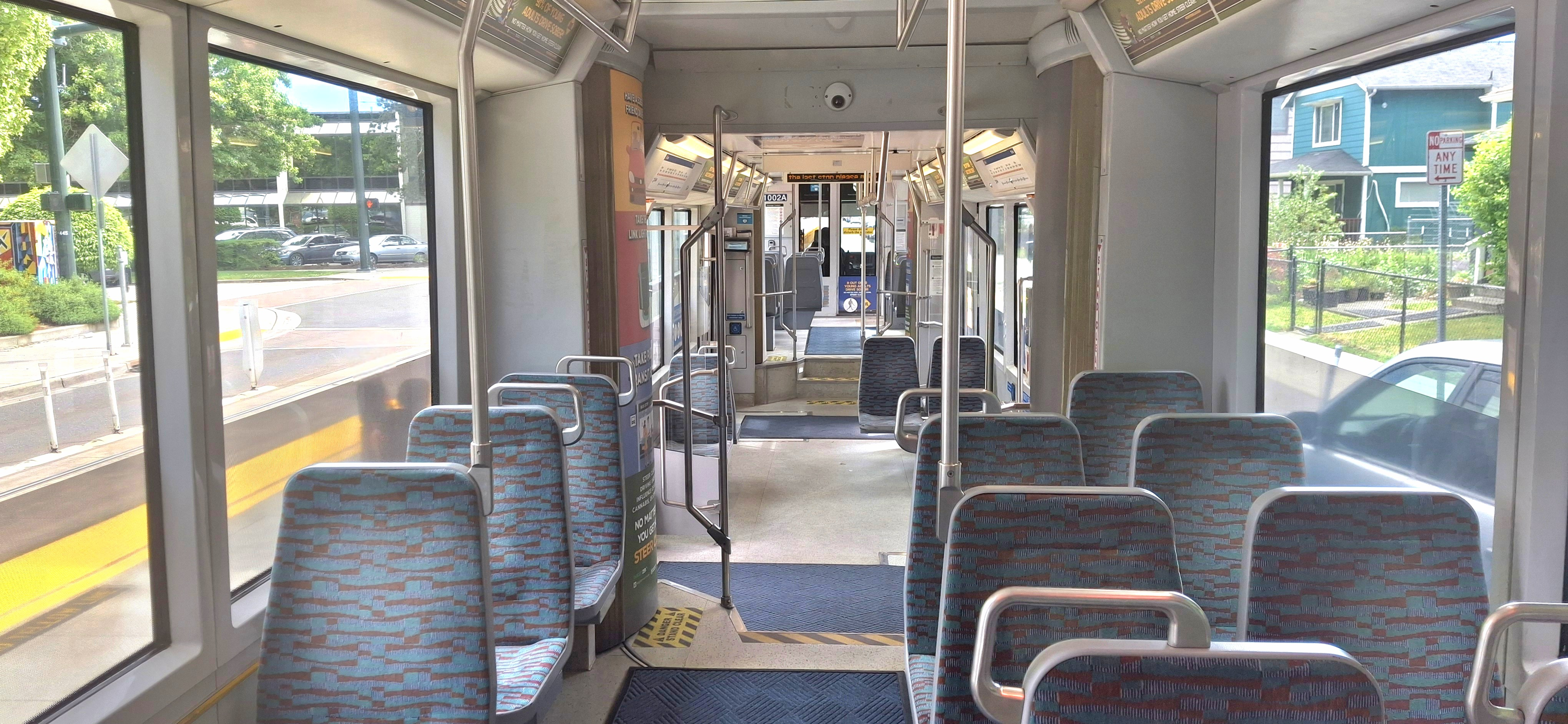
The interior view of a Škoda 10 T streetcar in Tacoma, Washington

In the field of trams, Škoda Dopravní technika modernised a total of 26 Tatra T3 trams operated in Plzeň to type T3M.0 (factory designation Škoda 01T; 1993–1999) and 20 T3 trams operated in Liberec to type T3M.04 (factory designation Škoda 02T; 1995–1999) in the 1990s. In 1997, the company produced its first own tram, the Škoda 03T (also LTM 10.08, “Astra”, “Anitra”), which was gradually delivered to five Czech tram operators until 2006.

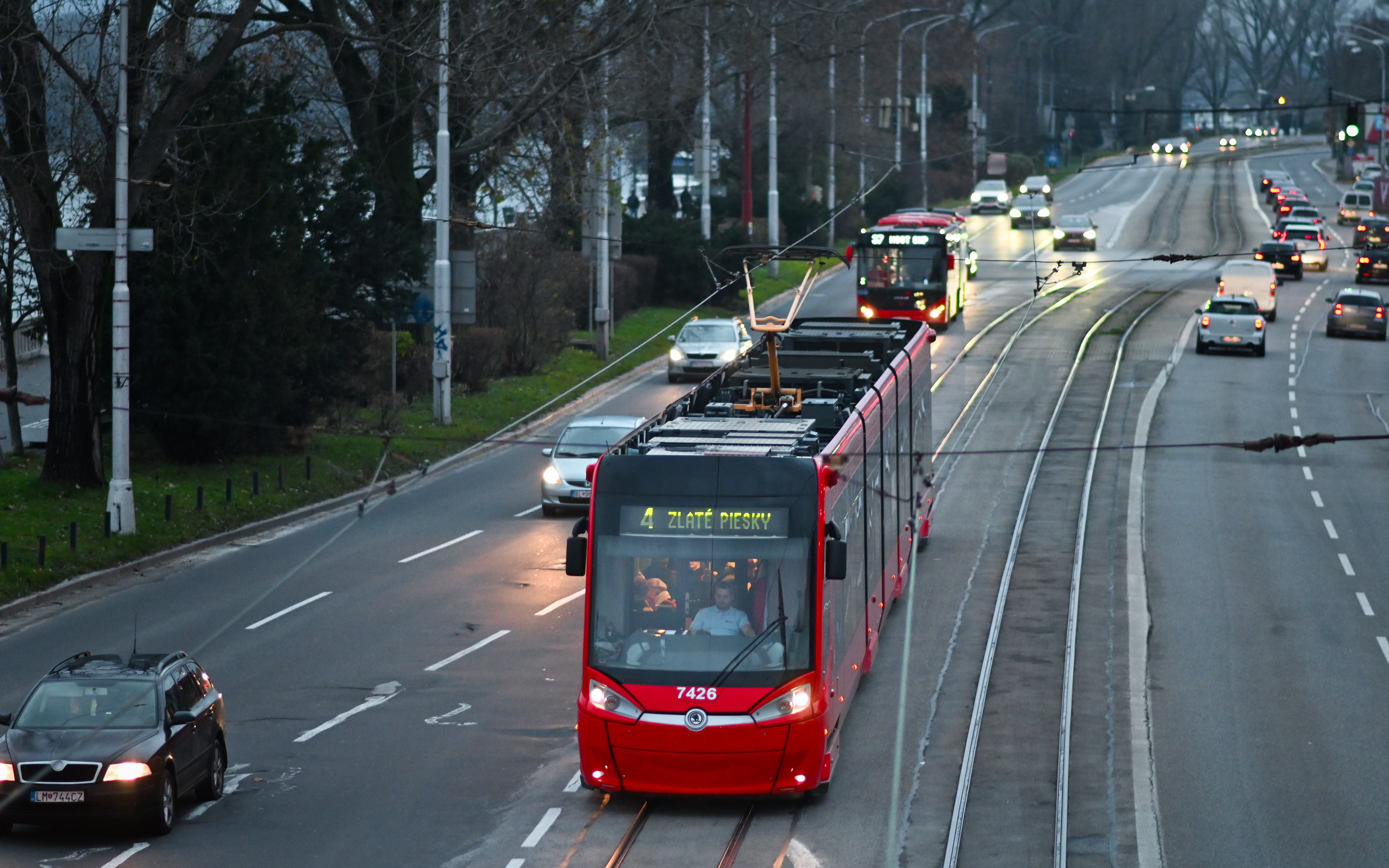
Škoda 29 T ForCity in operation in Bratislava

This was followed by other types, some of which were also exported. The latest models of trams are supplied under the trade name Škoda ForCity, which the company delivers to several European countries. In the Czech Republic, they have been delivered to Brno (Škoda 45T - from 2022), Plzeň (Škoda 40T - from 2021), Ostrava (Škoda 39T - from 2021) and Prague (Škoda 15T - 2009-2019 and Škoda 52T).

Germany became the second most important market for trams after 2020. The Škoda Group has delivered trams to the Saxonian city of Chemnitz (35T, ForCity Classic, 2018–2020), to the three cities of Mannheim, Ludwigshafen am Rhein and Heidelberg (36T, 37T, 38T, all ForCity Smart, since 2022), Bonn (41T, ForCity Smart, since 2023) and to the three cities of Frankfurt an der Oder, Cottbus and Brandenburg an der Havel (46T, 47T, 48T, ForCity Plus, since 2024). Preparations are also underway for production of trams for Kassel (50T, ForCity Smart).

Škoda trams also operate in the Finnish cities of Helsinki (Artic, ForCity Smart, 2013-2019; Artic X54, ForCity Smart, from 2021) and Tampere (Artic X34, ForCity Smart, 2020-2021), and Miskolc in Hungary (26T, from 2013 to 2015). In 2024, the Škoda Group delivered two-way trams to the Slovak city of Bratislava (30T, ForCity Plus).

=== Metro trains ===
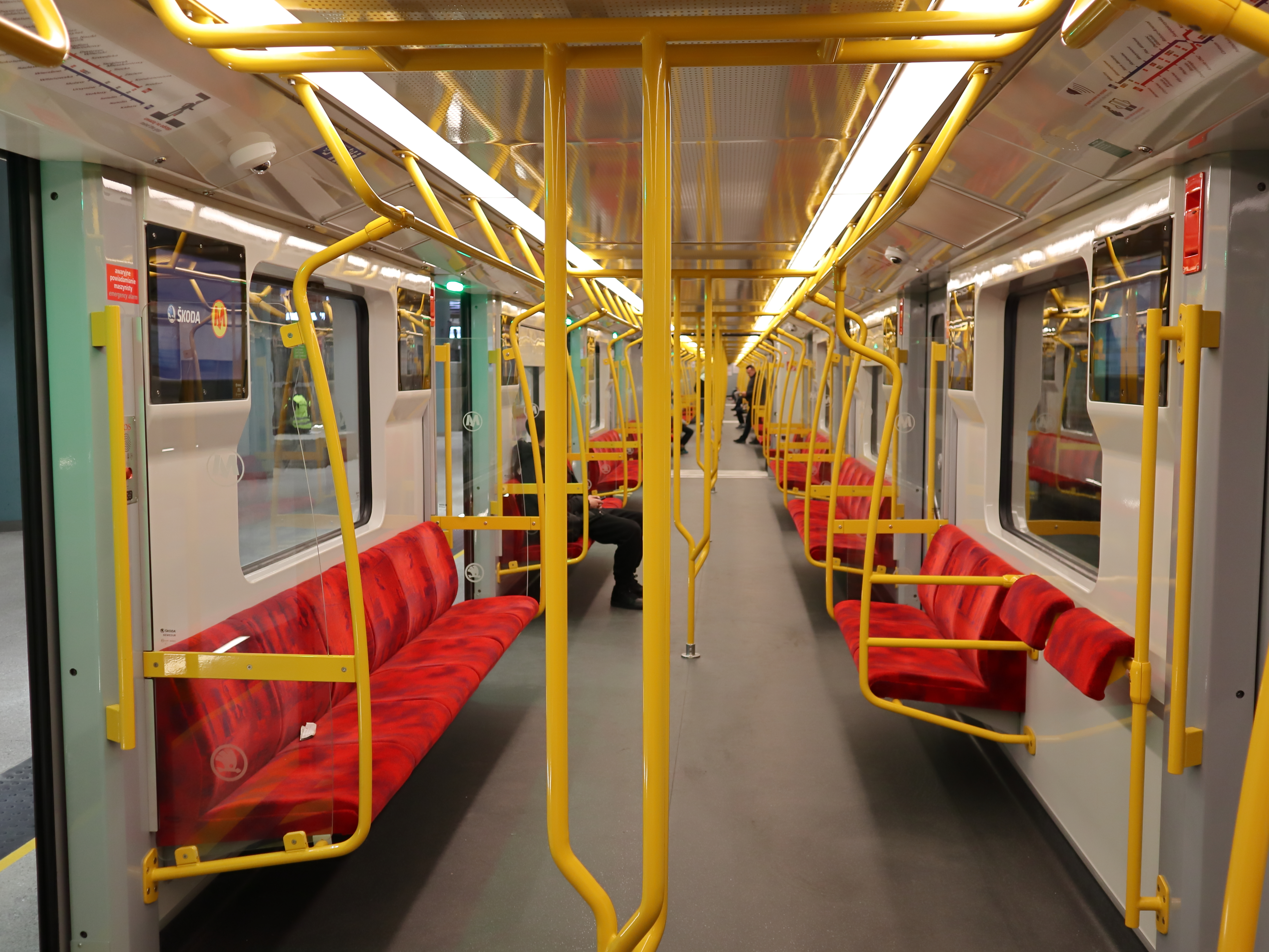
Interior of the Škoda Varsovia metro train of the Warsaw Metro

Škoda Transportation modernised the 81-71 metro trains to type 81-71M for the Prague Metro between 1996 and 2011. In 2003 it produced a prototype of the new 6Mt metro train. The company also participated in production and modernisation of 81-553 trains for Kazan and Kyiv (the Slavutych train) and participated in the production of NěVa trains for St. Petersburg. At the beginning of 2020, the company signed a contract for delivery of metro trains to Warsaw. The first metro train from the workshops of the Škoda Group will begin carrying passengers in the Polish capital in October 2022. Another contract which has been signed is for delivery of eight metro trains to the Bulgarian city of Sofia. This was signed in July 2023.

=== Railway vehicles ===
Škoda Transportation produced type 109E electric locomotives (series 380 ČD, 381 ZSSK and 102 DB Regio) and modernised 71E electric locomotives to type 71Em (series 163 → series 363.5 ČD Cargo). In the field of rail transport, the company was not planning any new locomotive type in 2020, instead focusing on the development and production of RegioPanter and InterPanter electric units.

In the field of rail transport, production by the Škoda Group shifted from locomotives to other types of rail units. Production of these can be divided into two broad categories:

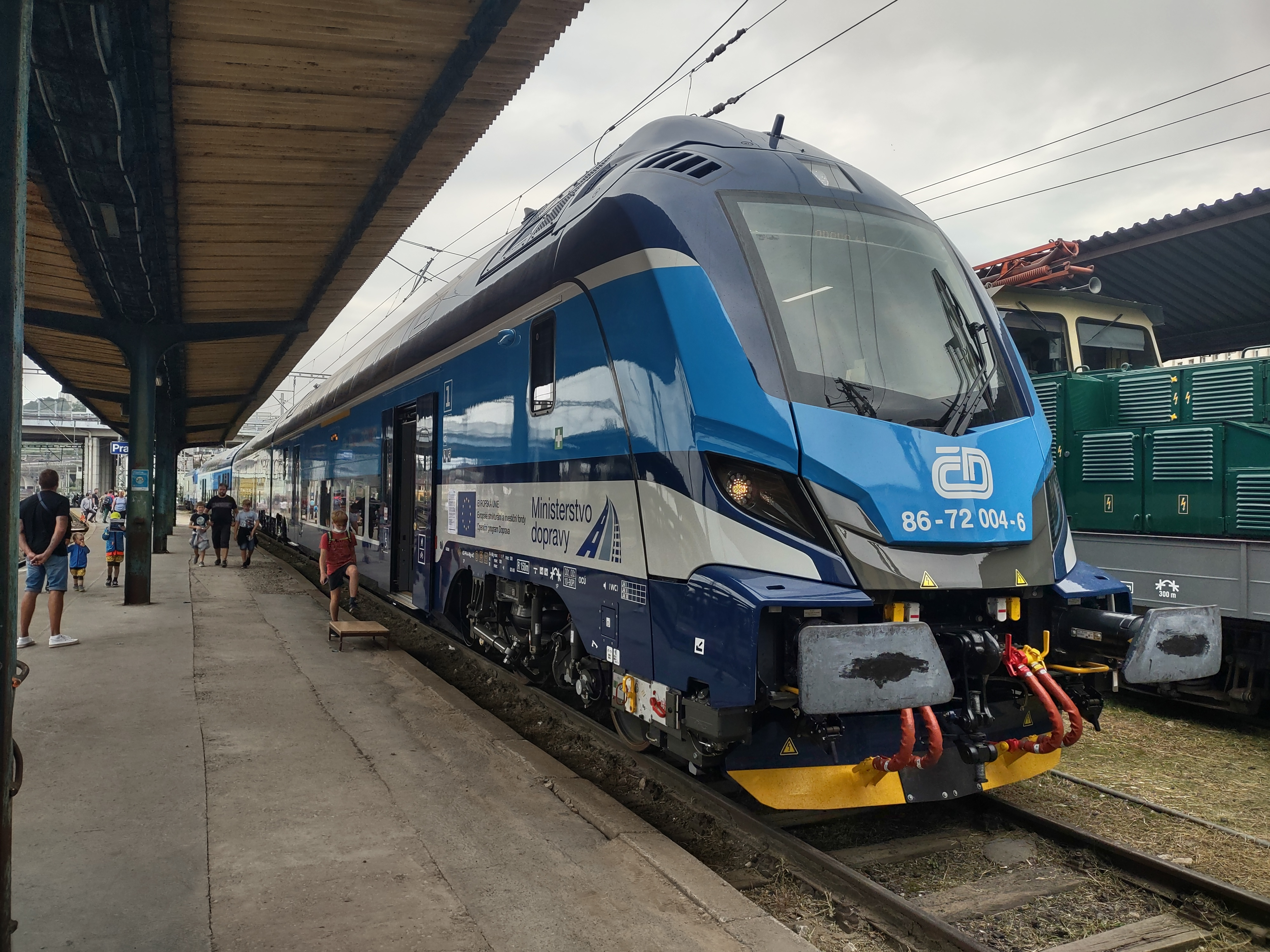
Škoda 13EV control car of ČD in Prague

Push-Pull Units, i.e. non-traction units with a control car, which need a locomotive to move, have been operating in Slovakia since 2011 (factory designation 3Ev) and in Germany and the Czech Republic since 2021 (factory designation 13Ev)

Within the portfolio of the Škoda Group, electric units (EMUs) bear the designation RegioPanter (for regional operation) or InterPanter (for longer-distance transport). The first RegioPanter EMU was designated type 7Ev. This was put into trial operation in September 2012 and in February 2013, units from this series were approved by the Railway Authority. In the Czech Republic, RegioPanter units operate in the Plzeň, South Moravian, Moravian-Silesian, Olomouc, Hradec Králové, Pardubice, Ústí nad Labem and Central Bohemian regions.

Abroad, EMUs are delivered to Slovakia and Latvia. The first units are expected to be deployed in Estonia in 2024 and deliveries of trains to Uzbekistan are also planned.

Another rail transport sector in which the Škoda Group is involved is sleeper carriages. In this area, the sleeper project for the Finnish State Railways VR Group was the furthest along in 2024. Their deployment is planned by 2025 at the latest. Italian railway carrier Trenitalia has ordered sleeper carriages from the Škoda Group. The category of sleeper cars also includes a contract for modernisation of cars for the Austrian carrier ÖBB.

=== Locomotive factory ===
As a part of its shift towards non-military production, the Works earmarked a portion of its facilities for manufacturing of locomotives. The production started following an order for 30 locomotives for Czechoslovakia. The first Škoda locomotive left the factory on 11 June 1920. Meanwhile, Škoda gained a major contract for production of 80 and refurbishment of 500 locomotives for Romania. Due to the Romanian order Škoda regained banks' confidence which provided the company with financing to survive through the immediate post-war years. The locomotive factory became one of the company's main pillars.

Škoda rolling stock products

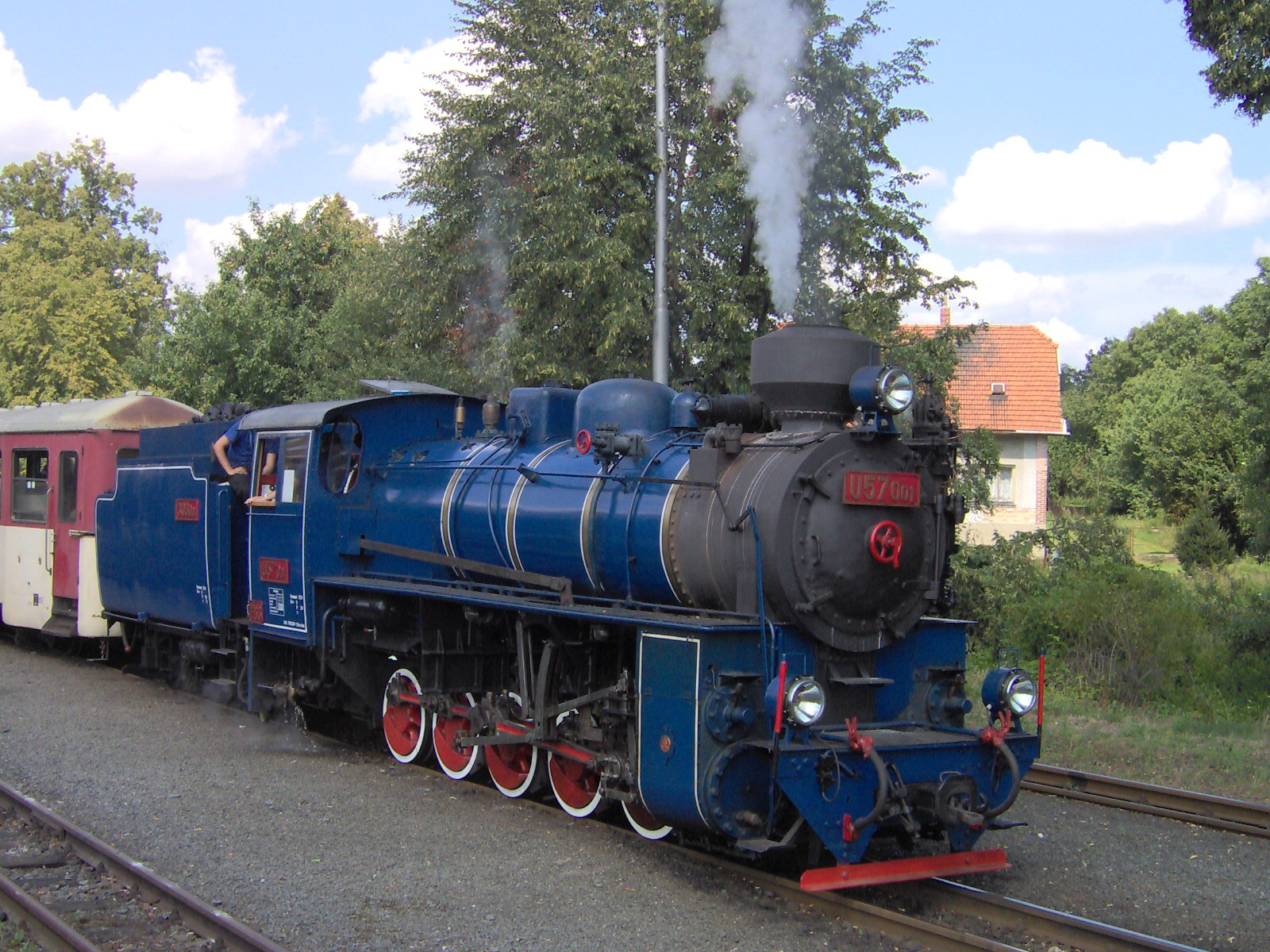
1930s Škoda locomotive

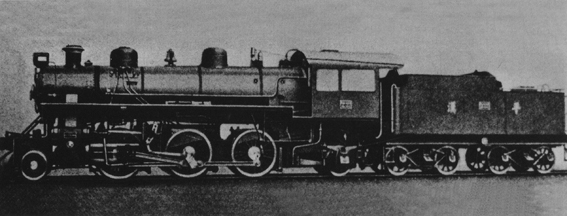
1930s locomotive exported to China

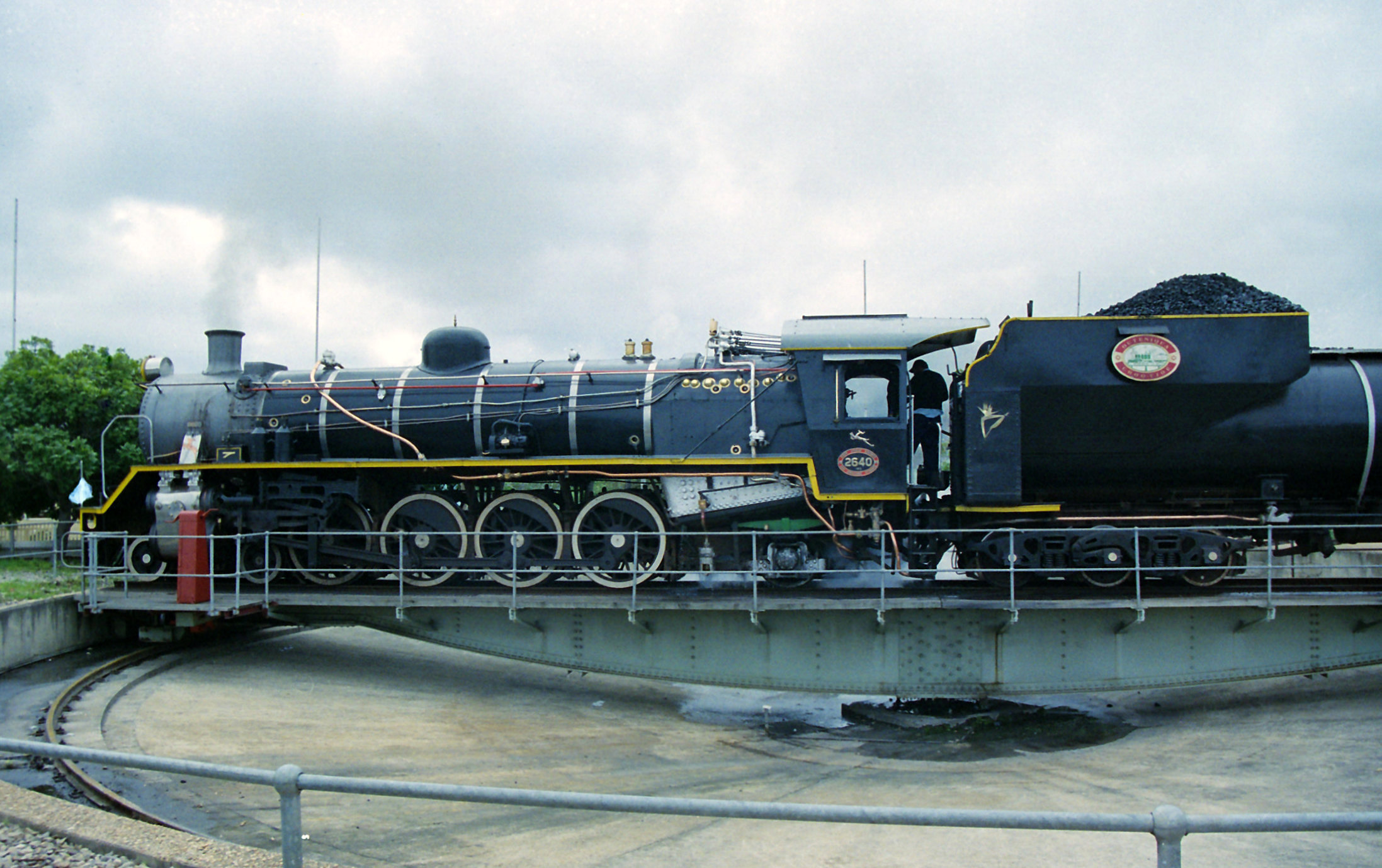
1938 Class 19D in South Africa

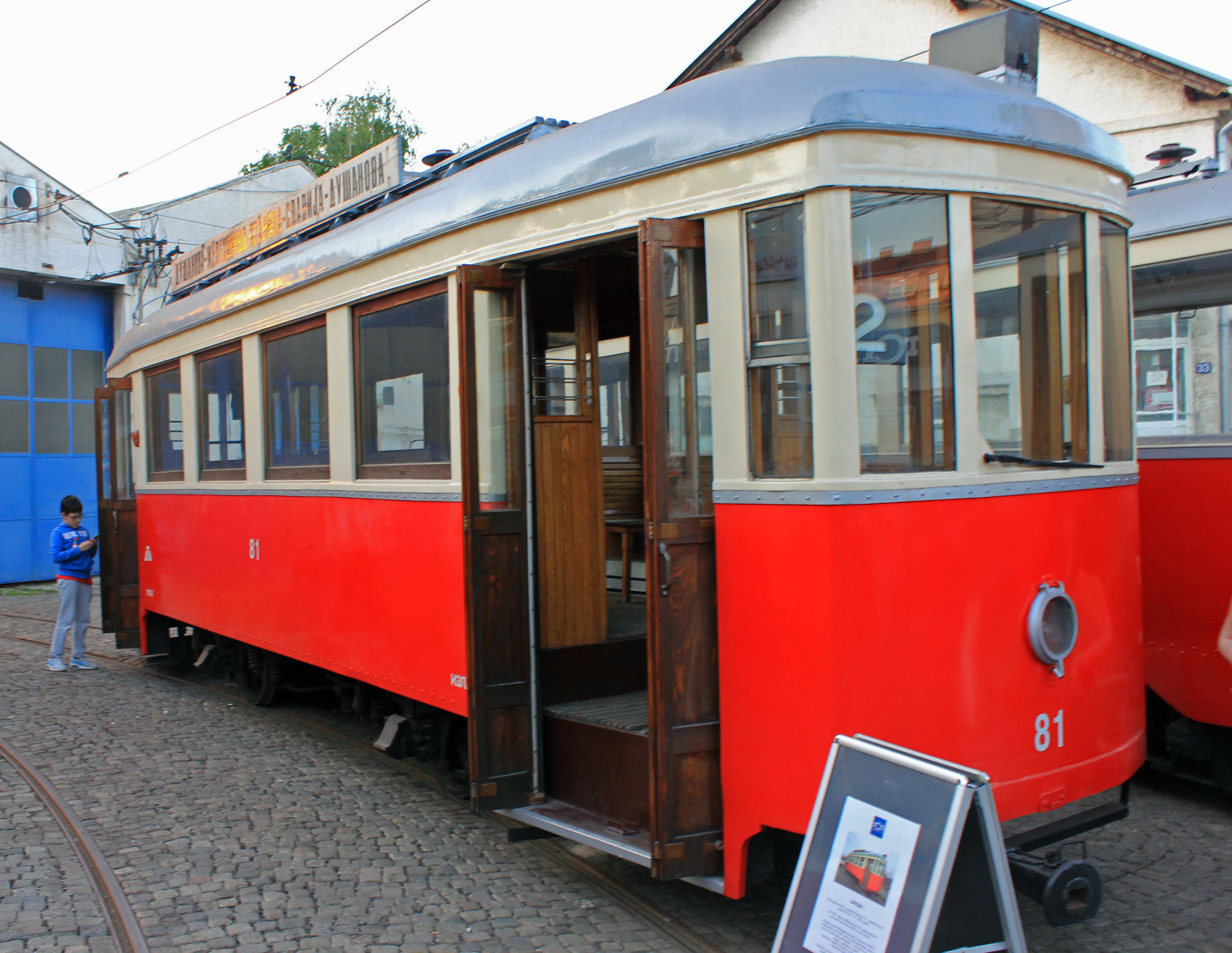
Škoda pre-WWII tram of Belgrade, Serbia, now in museum

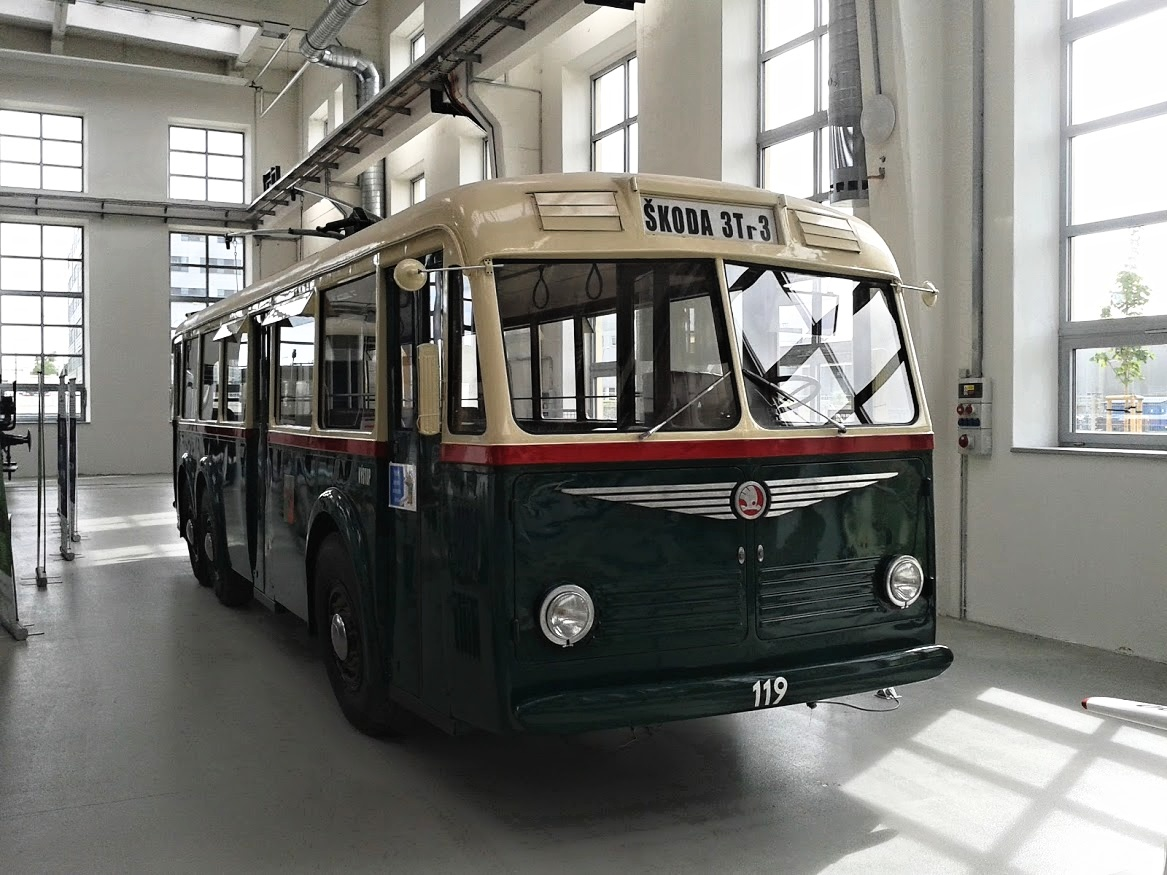
1941 Škoda 3Tr trolleybus

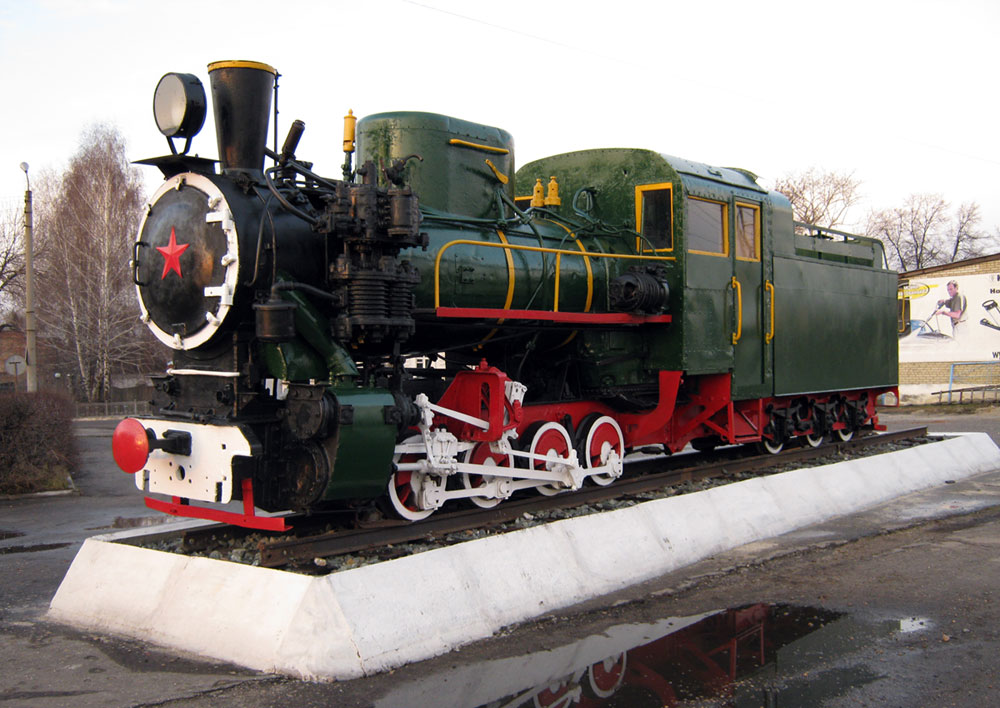
1949 Кч4 in Russia

The company produced its 100th locomotive on 13 September 1921. In 1927 Škoda produced its first express electric locomotive which was followed by the introduction of electric freight locomotives. While electric locomotives were used on electrified lines within Prague, the company further produced electric locomotives with batteries for use within factory areas. Also in 1927, Škoda started production of diesel locomotives and diesel express trains. In the 1930s, the locomotive factory was producing on average 3 locomotives a month with third of the production for export.

Meanwhile, in another factory building situated in Plzeň, Škoda started producing electrical propulsion units for trams in the early 1920s. In 1936 the company started producing the model 3Tr, 6Tr, 7Tr, 8Tr, 9Tr trolleybuses.

Production of locomotives as well as trolleybuses continued during the company's period of nationalization after the WW2. After fall of communism in 1989, Škoda Works were transformed into a joint stock company, the assets of which were later diversified into several separate entities, among them also Škoda Dopravní Technika s. r. o. which included the rolling stock factory in Plzeň and which was renamed to Škoda Transportation in 2004.

In the early 1990s, the company started working also on refurbishment of trams, which was followed by introduction of its first own tram design in 1997, the low-floor Škoda 03 T.

=== Trolleybuses ===
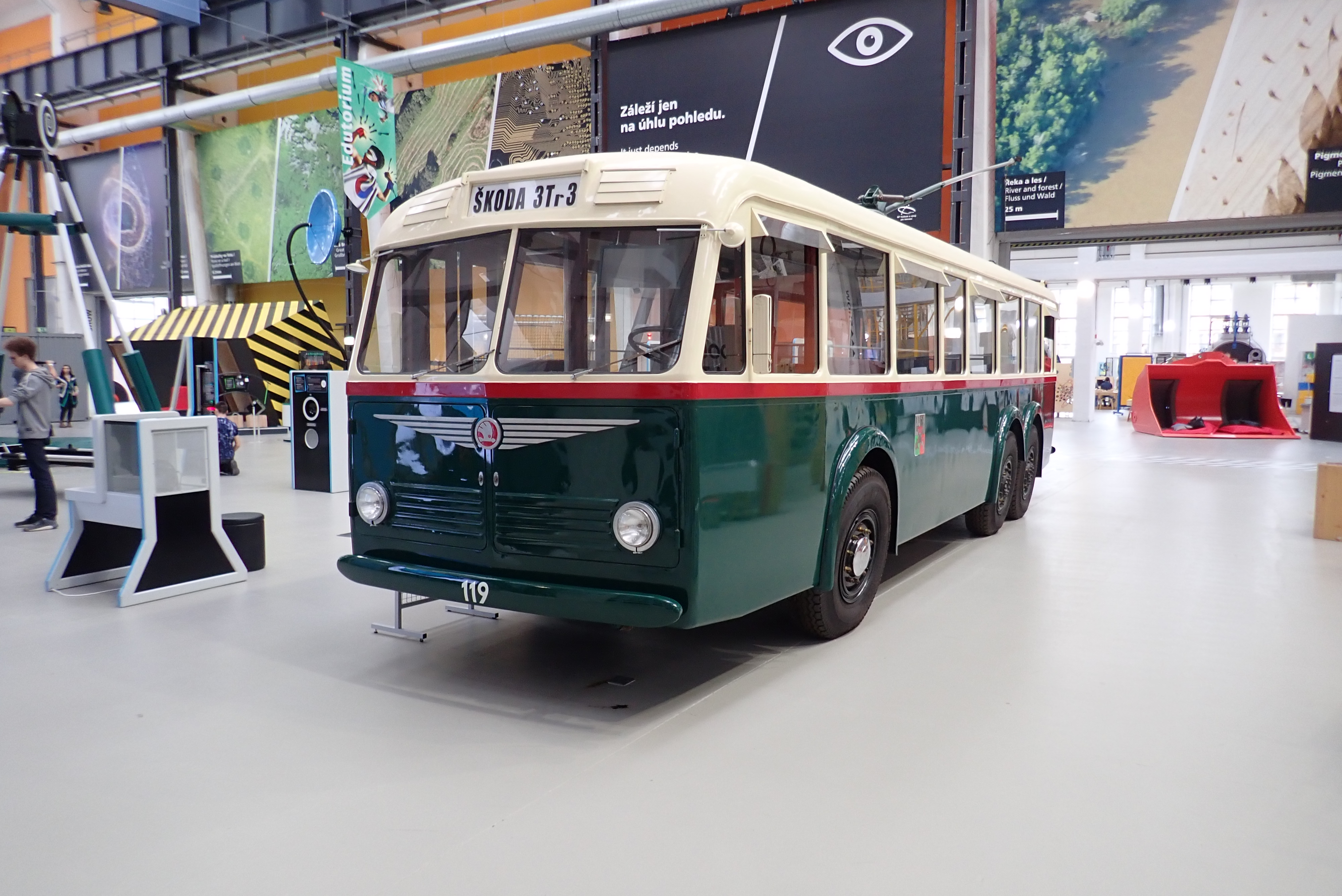
Škoda 3Tr3 trolleybus on display at the Techmania Science Center, Plzeň

The first mass-produced trolleybus bearing the Škoda brand began running in 1941. Since then, nearly forty models have been developed under the Škoda badge, many of which are currently in use not only in the Czech Republic, but also in a number of countries throughout the whole of Europe. There has been a renaissance in trolleybus production in recent years - in 2014 the Škoda Group celebrated production of its 14,000th trolleybus and in 2023, production of its 15,000th trolleybus. At present, the Škoda Group is focusing mainly on solutions for electrical equipment, with the bodywork supplied by one of the partners it works with on its projects. A number of trolleybus models are equipped with batteries enabling them to cross sections without overhead lines.

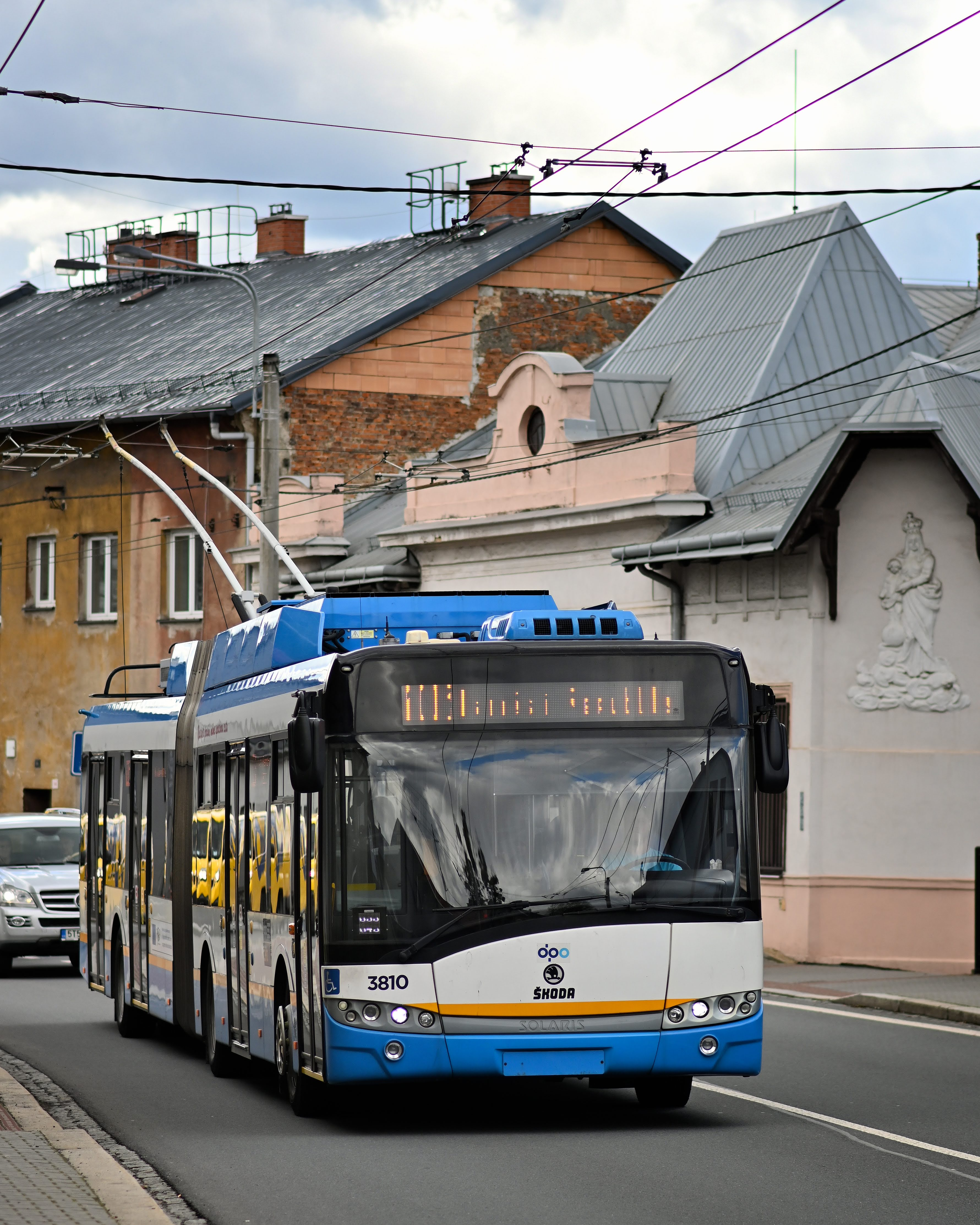
Škoda 27Tr Solaris trolleybus in Ostrava

In Czech cities, Škoda trolleybus units operate in Prague (38 Tr, Solaris,24 m; 36 Tr, Temsa), Plzeň, Brno (31 Tr, SOR; 32 Tr, SOR), Ostrava (36 Tr, Temsa; 31 Tr, SOR) Opava (36 Tr, Temsa; 32 Tr, SOR), Jihlava (32 Tr, SOR) Pardubice (28 Tr, Solaris; 30 Tr, SOR; 32 Tr, SOR) Hradec Králové (30 Tr, SOR; 31 Tr, SOR) České Budějovice, Zlín (35 Tr, Iveco; 30 Tr, SOR Teplice (28 Tr, Solaris; 30 Tr, SOR, 32 Tr, SOR, 33 Tr, SOR) Ústí nad Labem (28 Tr, Solaris) and in Mariánské Lázně (30 Tr, SOR).

Abroad, the greatest number of trolleybuses operate in Slovakia, specifically in Banská Bystrica (30Tr SOR; 31Tr SOR), Bratislava (30Tr SOR; 31Tr SOR; 38Tr, Solaris), Prešov (30Tr SOR; 31Tr SOR) and Žilina (30Tr SOR; 31Tr SOR). Škoda trolleybuses also operate in the Lithuanian city of Vilnius (32Tr).

=== Other activities ===
Škoda Transportation founded the Techmania Science Center in 2005 together with the University of West Bohemia in Plzeň. The goals of the Science Center include reviving interest among young people about studying technological disciplines and generally raising public awareness of science and technology. In 2015, Techmania was visited by over 271,000 tourists in 2015, making it the third most visited tourist destination in Plzeň.

The company was the recipient of two investment incentives in the form of income tax breaks in the total possible amount of CZK 1 billion.

As part of its cooperation with universities, the Škoda Group organises the Emil Škoda Prize every year. University students of technical disciplines from all over the country can participate in this competition with their diploma theses.

The Škoda Group organises the Škoda FIT Half Marathon, an international running race. This takes place in Plzeň in the middle of September.

== Škoda Group ==
Škoda Transportation is part of the Škoda Group, which includes other companies engaged in mechanical and electrical engineering: Škoda Electric, Škoda Vagonka, Škoda Pars, Škoda Transtech (Finland), Škoda Ekova, Škoda ICT, Škoda Digital, Škoda City Service, Škoda TVC, Poll, Škoda Transportation Deutschland (Germany), Škoda Polska (Poland), Bammer Trade, Ganz – Skoda Electric (Hungary), The Signalling Company and Škoda Investment. The entire group had nearly 3,500 employees in 2013 and generated sales of CZK 14.6 billion. In 2021, the entire group had over 6,500 employees, sales of CZK 15.5 billion and generated a net profit of CZK 580 million. The company also owns a 32 % stake in Pragoimex.

In 2011, Škoda Transportation bought the company Autobusová doprava-Miroslav Hrouda in Zbiroh. The main reason for this acquisition was to allow Škoda to test its newly developed and produced hybrid buses in live operation.

In 2013, Škoda Transportation established the subsidiary Škoda Transportation Deutschland in the German city of Munich. The aim of the German Škoda company was to create a business unit encompassing sales, technical and service activities which would be responsible for development of the business activities of the Škoda Transportation Group on the German, Austrian and Swiss markets. In the same year, Škoda bought the Ostrava-based company Lokel, which specialised in the design and supply of electrical equipment for rolling stock.

In 2015, Škoda Transportation acquired a majority stake in Transtech, a Finnish company which engages in production of low-floor trams and double-decker railway carriages. The company has been called Škoda Transtech since 2018, when the remaining shares were purchased.

In 2016, Škoda Transportation established a new subsidiary in the United States, Škoda Transportation USA. The main aim is to create a fully-fledged base in the USA consisting of business development (identification and development of business opportunities), a technical department, purchasing and project management, all the way through to production. Establishment of the company is the first step in the planned expansion into the North American market.

In 2019, the separate Škoda Digital division for Digital Transport Solutions was created within the Škoda Transportation Group.

In 2020, Škoda Transportation bought the Ostrava-based company Ekova Electric. The transfer was completed in 2021, when the company changed its name to Škoda Ekova.

In 2022, presentation of the entire Škoda Transportation Group was changed and the group began operating under the name Škoda Group. In the same year, the Škoda Group established a subsidiary in Italy.

In 2023, the Škoda Group expanded its portfolio to include two new companies. In January, it bought a significant part of the assets of the Austrian engineering and design company Molinari Rail Austria, which became the basis of the newly established Škoda Group Austria, and in February, it bought a majority share (93.6%) in the Belgian railway signalling system manufacturer The Signalling Company.

In 2024, the Škoda Group purchased the Czech electrical engineering company Cegelec from Vinci, which it renamed Electric Components.

Škoda rolling stock products

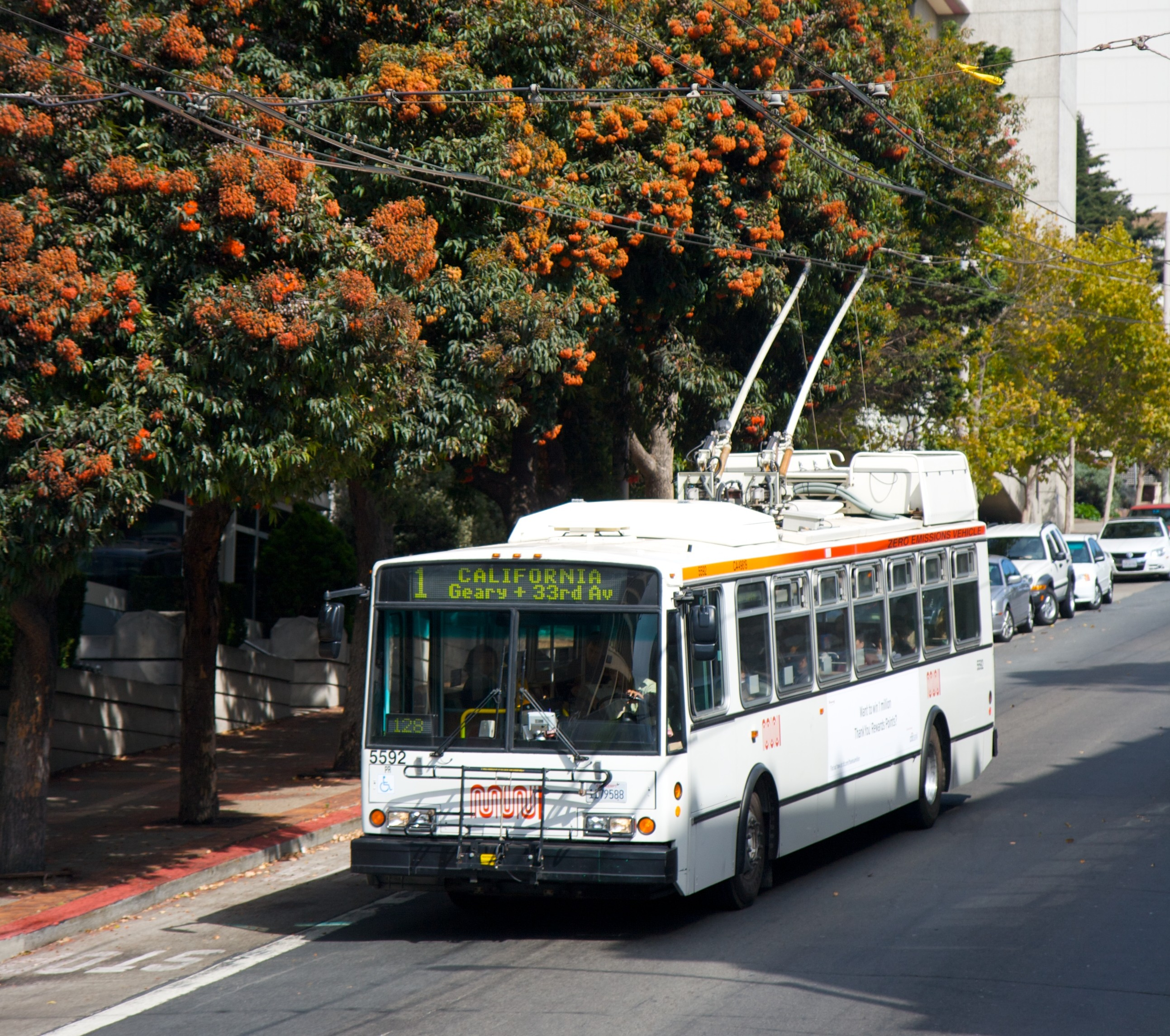
14TrSF - San Francisco Trolleybus

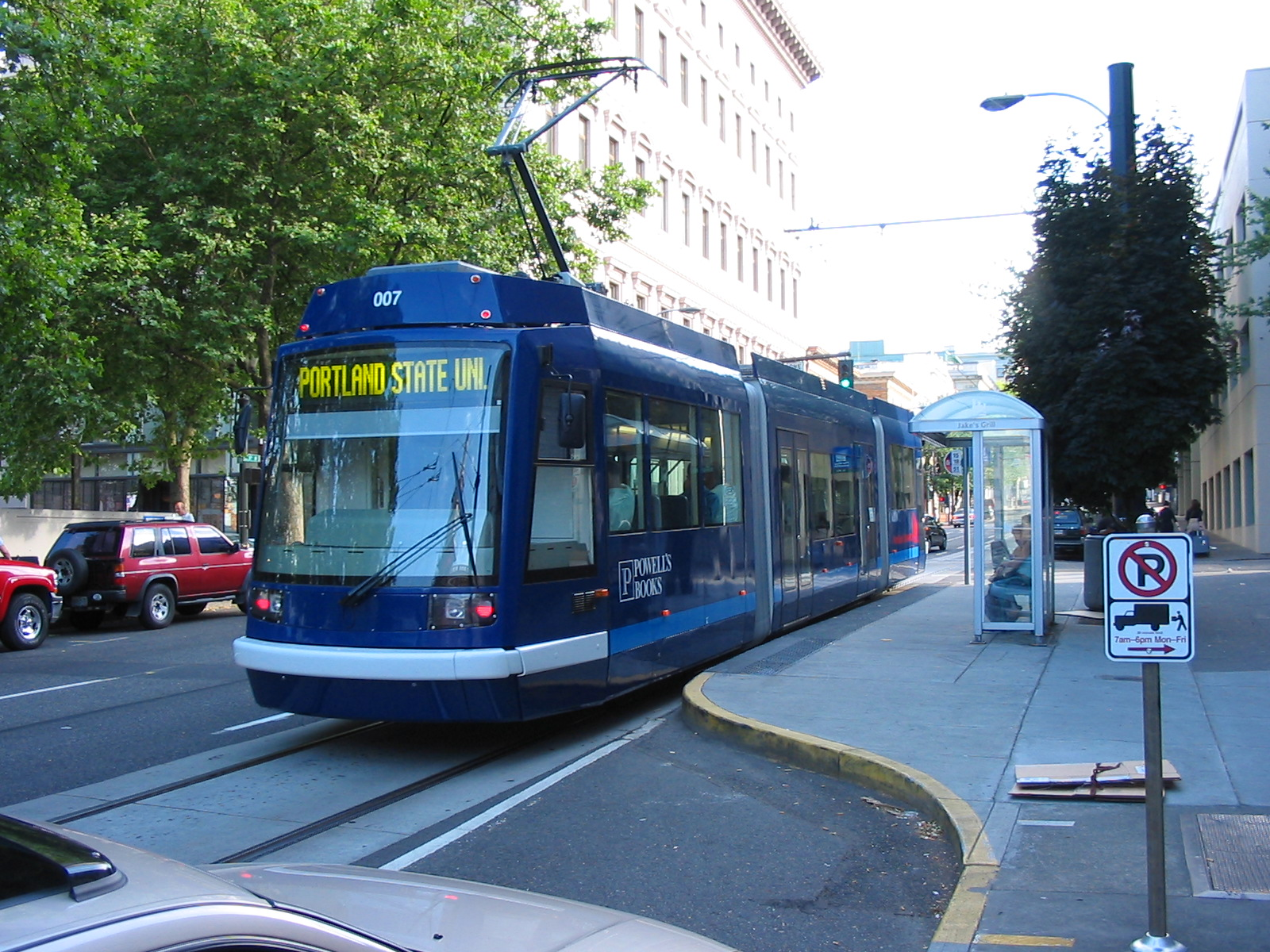
Portland Streetcar

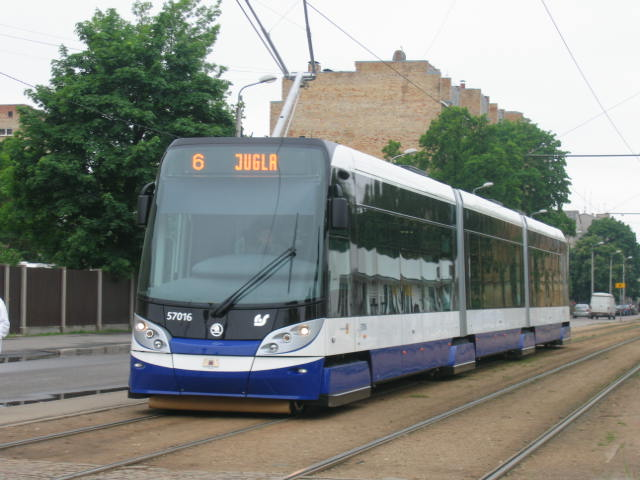
Škoda 15T tram in Riga

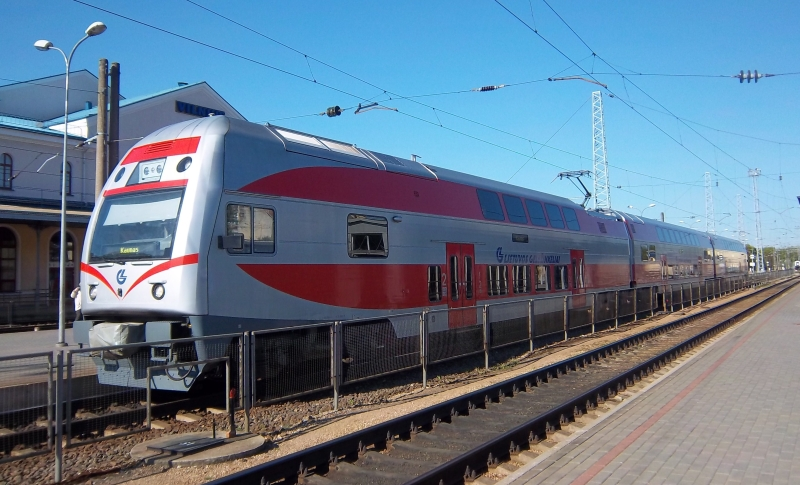
LG Class 575 in Lithuania

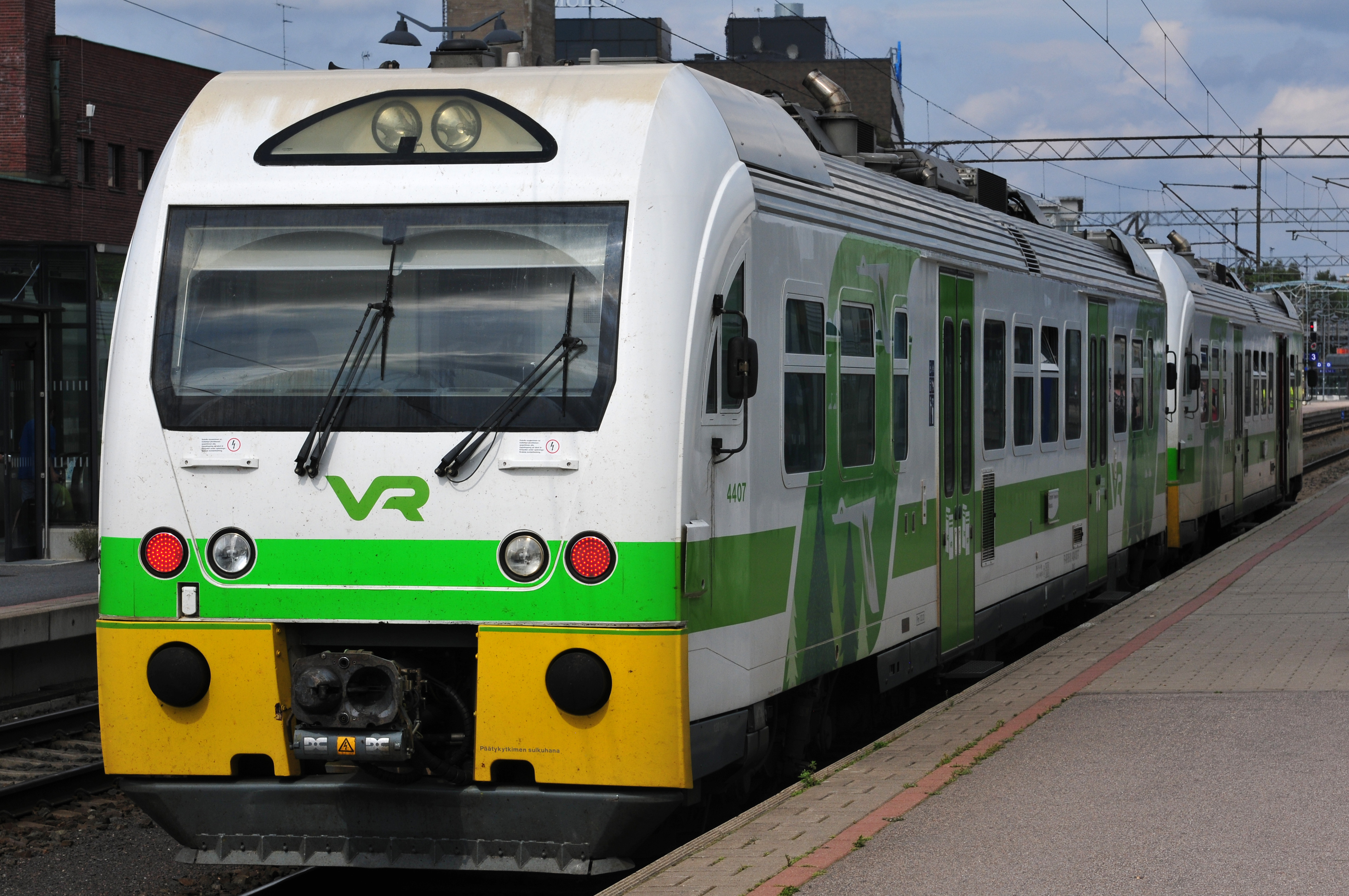
VR Class Dm12 diesel unit in Finland

== Subsidiaries and affiliate companies ==
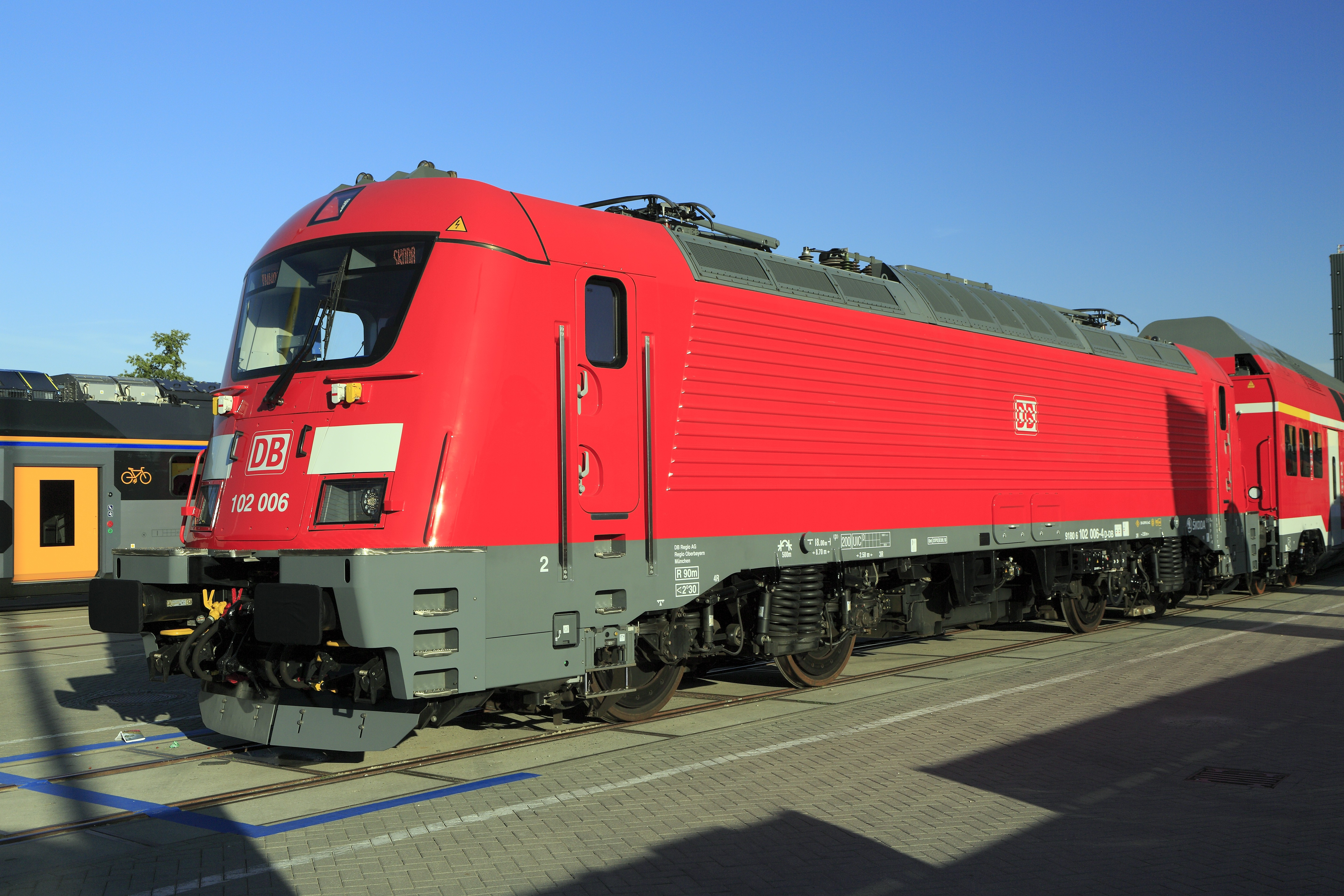
Locomotive Škoda 109E

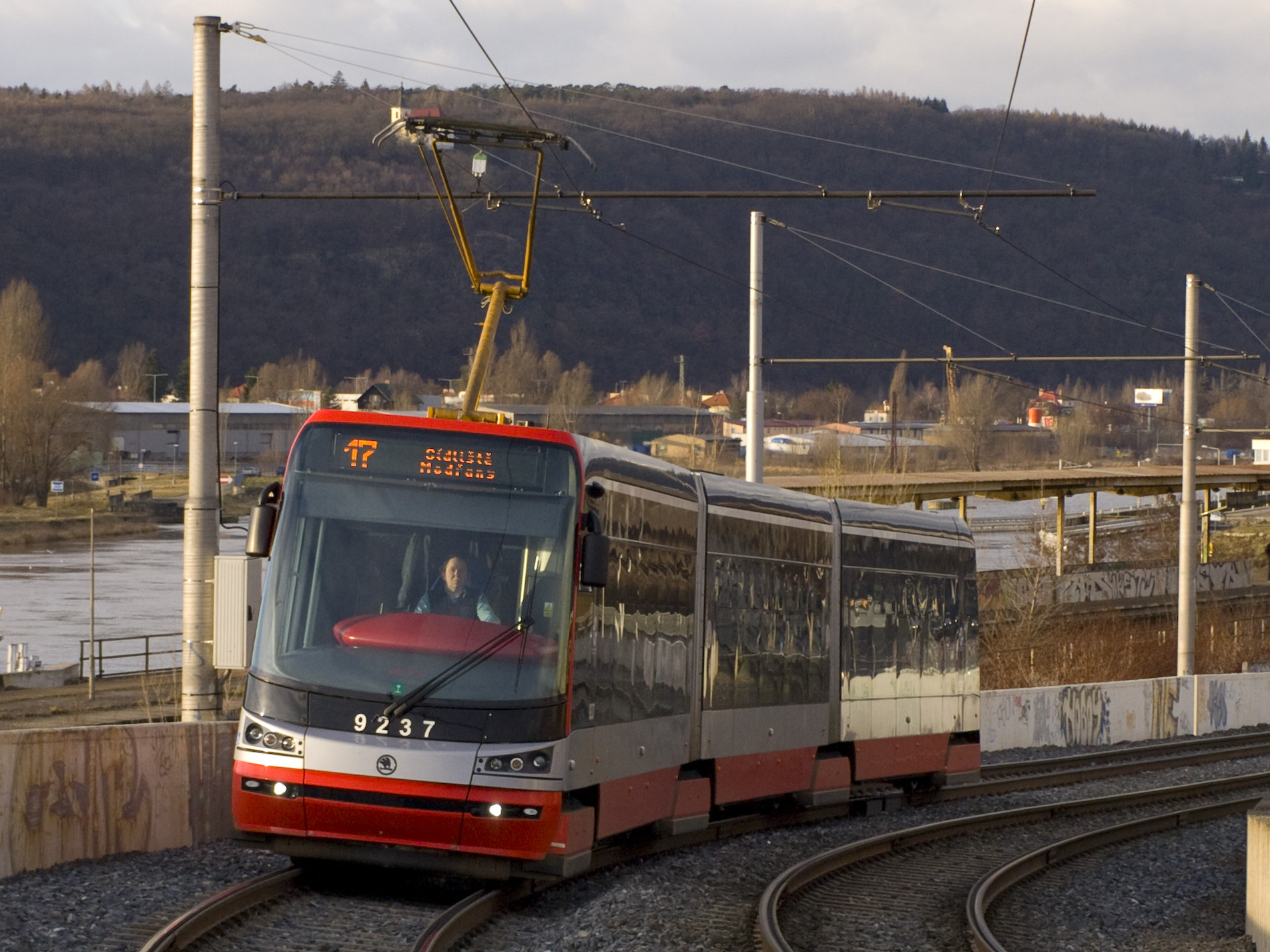
Škoda 15T ForCity tram in Prague

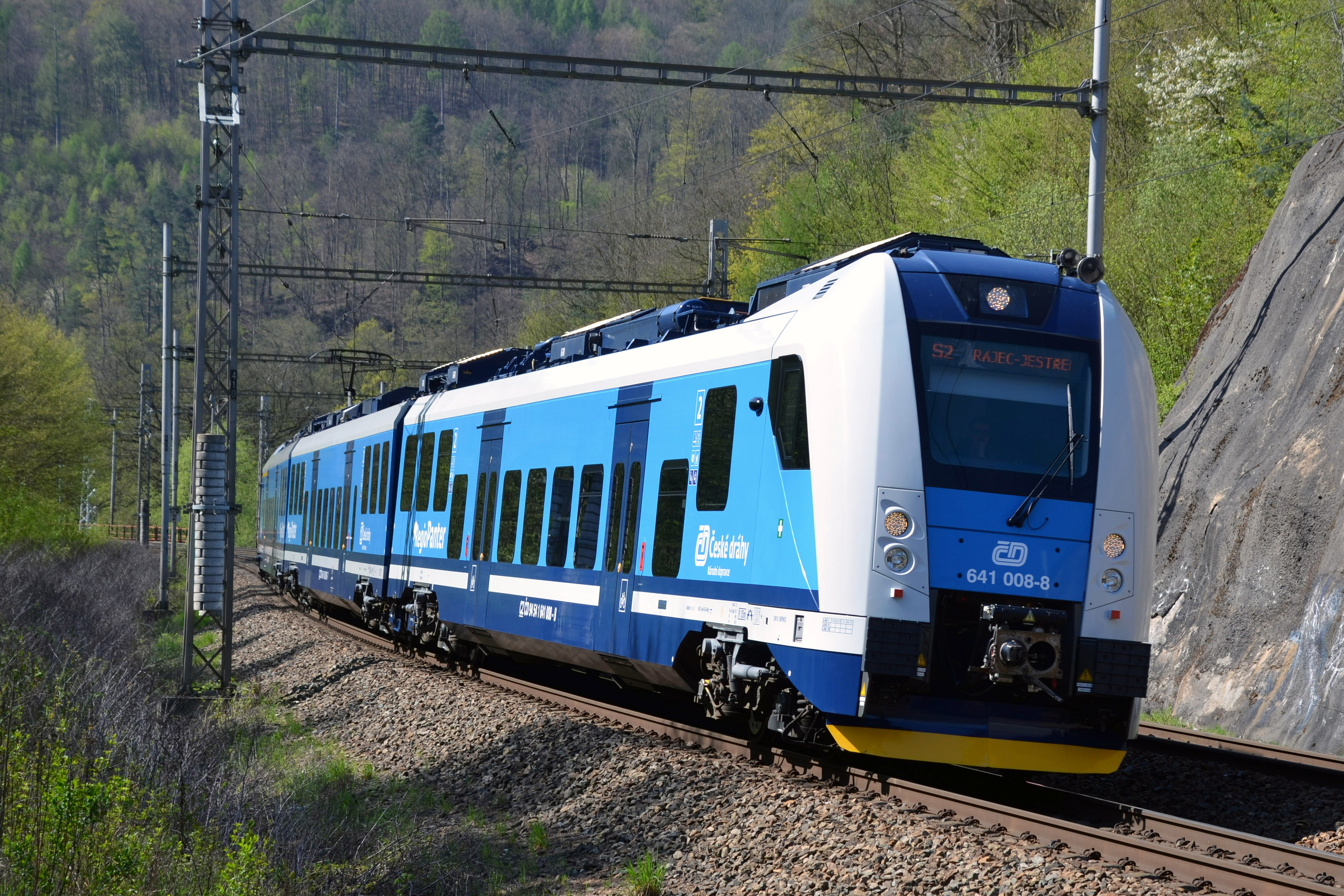
Škoda 7Ev electric multiple unit train

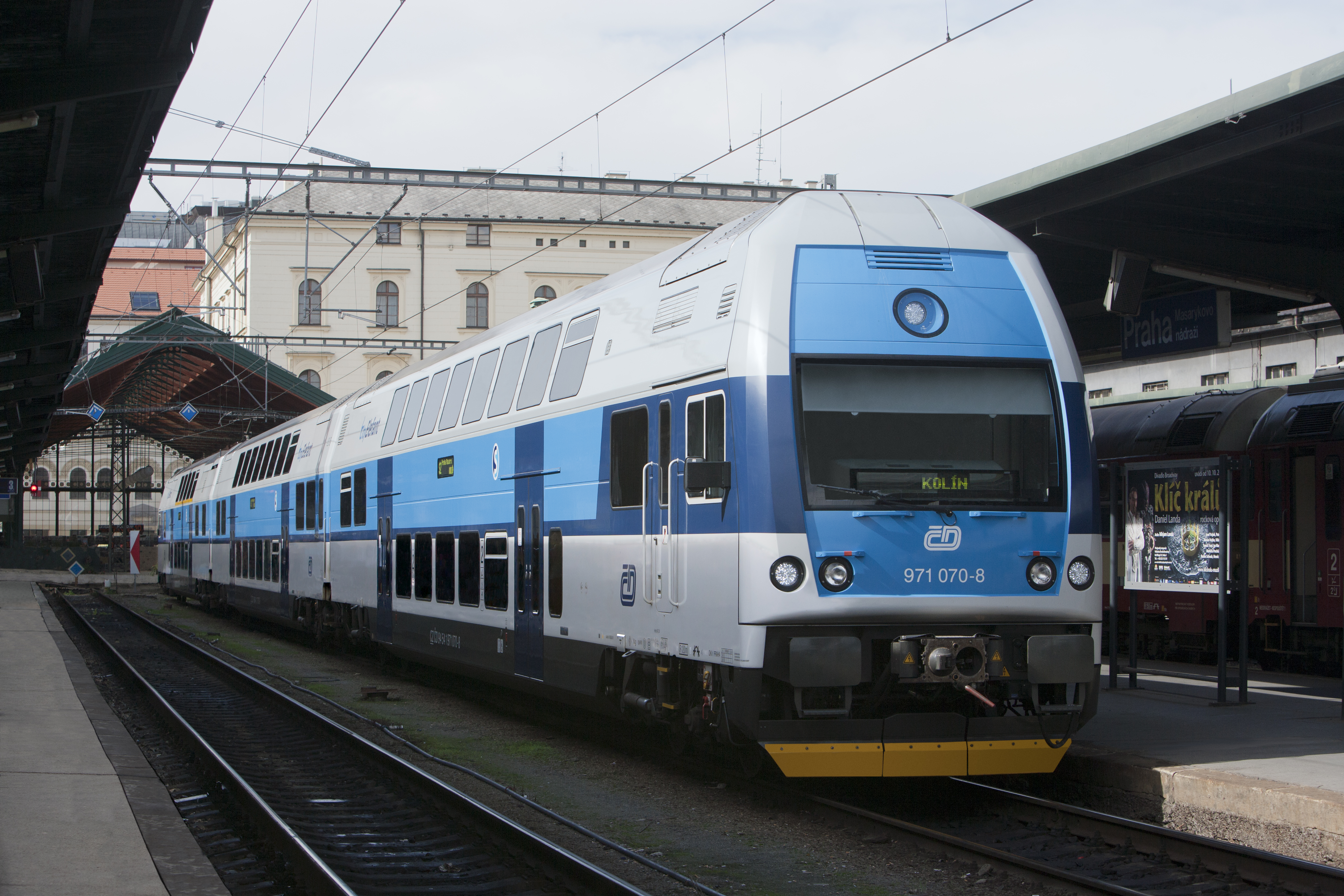
ČD Class 471 double deck electric multiple unit train

Škoda Transportation a.s. subsidiaries and affiliated companies

Name	Stake	Place	Focus	Turnover CZK (2016)
Škoda Transportation a.s.	parent	Plzeň, Czech Republic	rolling stock manufacturer locomotives, multiple units, trams	7.721.594.000
Škoda Vagonka a.s.	100	Ostrava, Czech Republic	rolling stock manufacturer passenger cars, multiple units Company founded in 1900 as Staudinger Waggonfabrik A.G.	2.031.624.000
Ganz-Skoda Electric Ltd.	100	Budapest, Hungary	rolling stock manufacturer	
OOO Vagonmaš	51	Saint Petersburg, Russia	rolling stock manufacturer	
Škoda Transtech	100	Oulu, Finland	rolling stock manufacturer	2.874.658.000
Škoda Electric a.s.	100	Plzeň, Czech Republic	electric drives and traction motors for trolleybuses, locomotives, multiple units, trams	2.498.656.000
Škoda Pars a.s.	100	Šumperk, Czech Republic	rolling stock renovations, repairs and refurbishment	2.553.419.000
Movo spol. s r.o.	100	Plzeň, Czech Republic	rolling stock renovations, repairs and refurbishment	57.908.000
POLL, s.r.o.	100	Prague, Czech Republic	development and manufacturing of electronic systems for applications in power electronics and other fields of electrical engineering	124.517.000
Škoda TVC s.r.o.	100	Plzeň, Czech Republic	production and installation of repeated single piece or small series of parts and subassemblies, especially for rail technique, machine tools and power industry	184.004.000
Lokel s.r.o.	100	Ostrava, Czech Republic	development and manufacturing of railway vehicle control systems	61.036.000
Škoda City Service s.r.o.	100	Plzeň, Czech Republic	City of Plzeň public transport service operator	259.880.000
Škoda Polska sp. z o.o.	100	Warsaw, Poland	Company representing the companies of Škoda Transportation group in the Polish market	
Skoda Transportation USA, LLC	100	Baltimore, MD, USA	represents group's interests in the US market	
SKODA Transportation Deutschland GmbH	75	Munich, Germany	sales/technical support/maintenance unit responsible for business development in Germany, Austria and Switzerland.	
OOO Skoda-R	99	Moscow, Russia		
PRAGOIMEX a.s.	32	Prague, Czech Republic	rolling stock manufacturer trams	
Zaporizkiy Elektrovoz	49	Zaporizhzhia, Ukraine		
TEMSA	50	Adana, Turkey	manufacturer of buses, midibuses, and light-trucks	

The group of companies employed close to 5,600 people in 2015, with revenues reaching CZK 17 billion.

== Techmania Science Center ==
Škoda Transportation and the University of West Bohemia run Techmania Science Center in Plzeň. The exhibition is annually visited by tens of thousands of schoolchildren and students who learn about various principles of mathematics and physics in an engaging way. The science center also includes a number of historical Škoda rolling stock products.
