= Luboš Měkota =

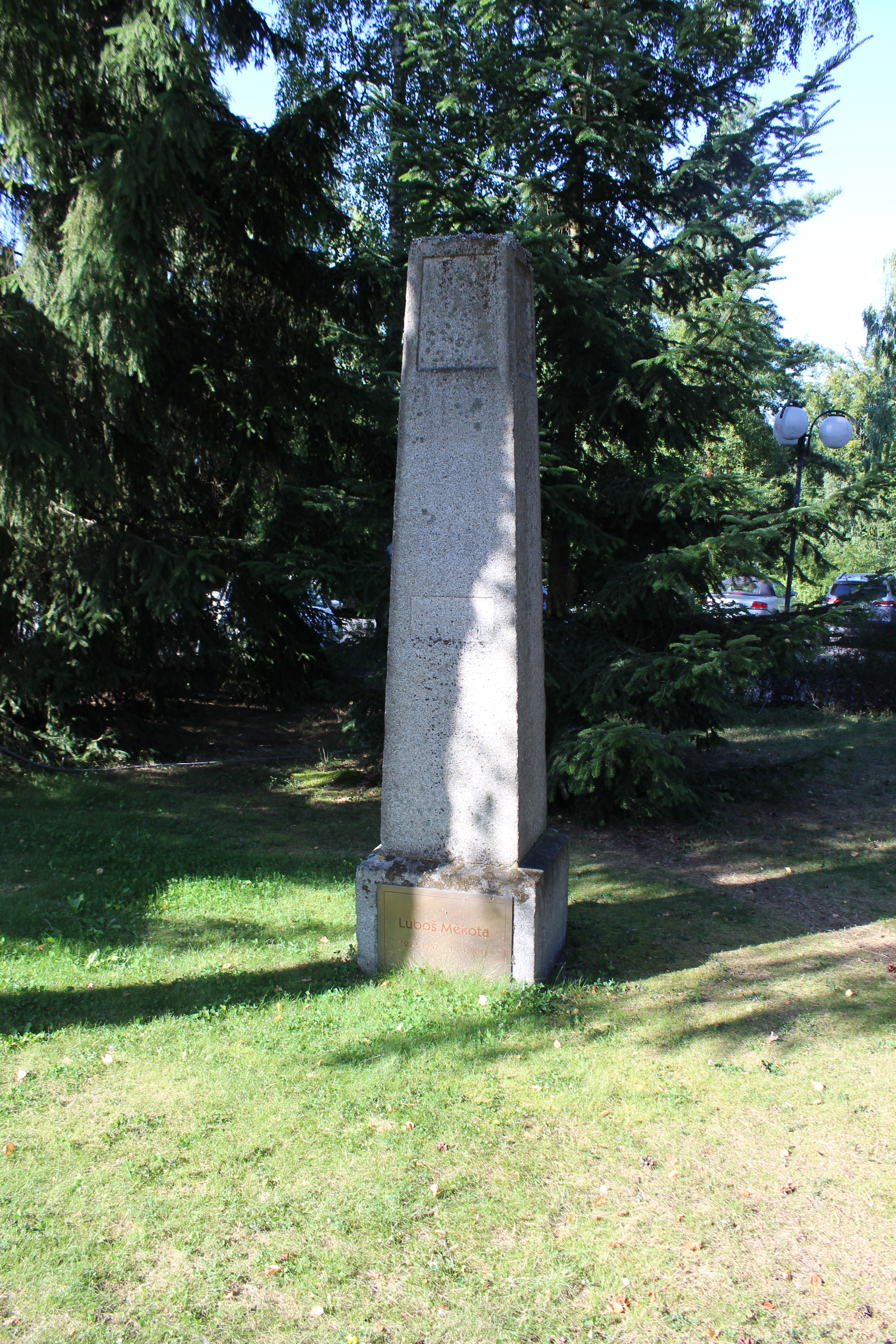
Monument to Luboš Měkota at the Karlovy Vary Golf Resort.

Luboš Měkota (22 May 1957 – 9 March 2013) was a Czech entrepreneur, miner, and union leader.

== Career ==
Luboš Měkota worked in the brown coal mines in Most as a young adult after graduating from the Secondary Industrial School in Duchcov. He also worked his way up through the mining company, starting from the bottom as a blue-collar worker. After the Velvet Revolution in November 1989, he was involved in Občanské hnutí (Civic Movement), and in 1990 became the chairman of the company's trade union organisation.

== MUS case ==
As the entire restructuring of MUS – something that had to be done due to the radical reduction in brown coal mining in the Czech Republic – required delicate cooperation with the employees of MUS and the creation of many retraining programmes, Oldřich Klimecký asked Luboš Měkota in 1995 to become the HR Director at MUS. Měkota accepted this position, and so ended up taking part in the entire transformation of MUS to new market conditions as one of its key people. Other key individuals included Petr Kolman, Bohuslav Straka, Vasil Bobela, Petr Pudil, Vladimír Rouček and the directors of various plants and companies.

Luboš Měkota gradually also became a member of the Board of Directors and then the CEO of MUS. He managed MUS from the position of CEO and chairman of the Board of Director until 2007, when he handed the management of MUS over to Messrs Pudil and Bobela, to whom he also transferred his ownership interest in the company. Luboš Měkota had received his ownership interest in MUS in 2005 when he, along with Antonín Koláček, Petr Pudil and Vasil Bobela, purchased MUS from Appian Group using a loan from ČSOB.

After his departure from MUS and the company's sale to Pavel Tykač, Luboš Měkota focused on managing his earnings, investing most of his money in environmental energy, development projects or the media (TV5, TV Metropol). Until his death in 2013, he had been active in the Supervisory Board of the University of Finance and Administration in Prague.
