= Marek Čmejla =

Czech entrepreneur and musician

Marek Čmejla (born 7 June 1967) is a Czech entrepreneur, fraudster and musician.

== Career ==
Čmejla completed his studies in technical cybernetics at the Faculty of Electrical Engineering of the Czech Technical University in Prague and has acted as a manager at NFMG Financial Management Group (NFMG), Appian Group and other companies.

In the 1990s, he was the bass guitarist of the band Tichá Dohoda. In 2013, he co-founded the band Všichni Svatí, which released its debut album “Vytáhni mě z davu” (“Pull Me Out of the Crowd”) in 2013.

Čmejla can be labelled, with a bit of hyperbole, the embodiment of the American dream in the Czech environment. He started his entrepreneurial activities while still at university, first selling books. After a number of years working freelance, he partnered up with a classmate from basic school, Petr Kraus, who founded NFMG, a financial group, in the mid-1990s. NFMG gradually became one of the most important non-banking companies in the Czech Republic. Mr Čmejla was the company’s Deputy Chairman of the Board of Directors.

NFMG was originally established by Petr Kraus and Antonín Koláček. Over time, Čmejla acquired fifty percent of NFMG, and held on to this share until 2001, when he sold it to Kraus. In 2002, he became the CEO of Appian Group Europe.

In 2003, Čmejla, together with Jiří Diviš, coordinated the strategic entrance of Appian Group into Škoda Plzeň, which, following Lubomír Soudek’s era, was in a state of clinical death. Appian Group purchased a part of the company for 350 million Czech crowns from the State and the remainder from the receiver in bankruptcy for 450 million crowns. The company then underwent successful restructuring, and today is a leading producer of transportation systems.

== MUS case ==
In October 2013, the Swiss courts sentenced him to 48 months in prison for fraud and money laundering. He was to have committed these crimes when Appian purchased a minority share in Mostecká uhelná společnost (MUS) from the Czech State in 1999. He appealed against this decision at the Federal Supreme Court of Switzerland in Lausanne.

In an interview for the daily Právo on 16 April regarding the MUS case, he said that "the idea that someone in the mid-1990s was chewing on the end of a pencil and planning to defraud the Czech State over the next twenty years and steal MUS is so bizarre that a person who makes such a claim has to be mentally ill or have something up his sleeve, or both."

In the same interview, Čmejla provided his assessment of the situation in which MUS found itself in 1999. To quote: "The fact that the brown coal industry even exists in this country today is due in a large part to the management of MUS at the time. The State decided to shut it down, and the management, in the interest of the company, decided to do everything in its power to ensure its survival."
