= Mirwais Maidan =

Mirwais Maidan میرویس میدان
- Neighborhood of Kabul
- Country: Afghanistan
- Province: Kabul

Mirwais Maidan (Pashto/Persian: میرویس میدان) is a modern neighborhood in the west of Kabul city. It is a part of Kabul's 3rd district. The Rahman Baba High School lies in this area of the city.

== See also ==
- Neighborhoods of Kabul
- Kote Sangi
