= Přílepy (Kroměříž District) =

- Municipality
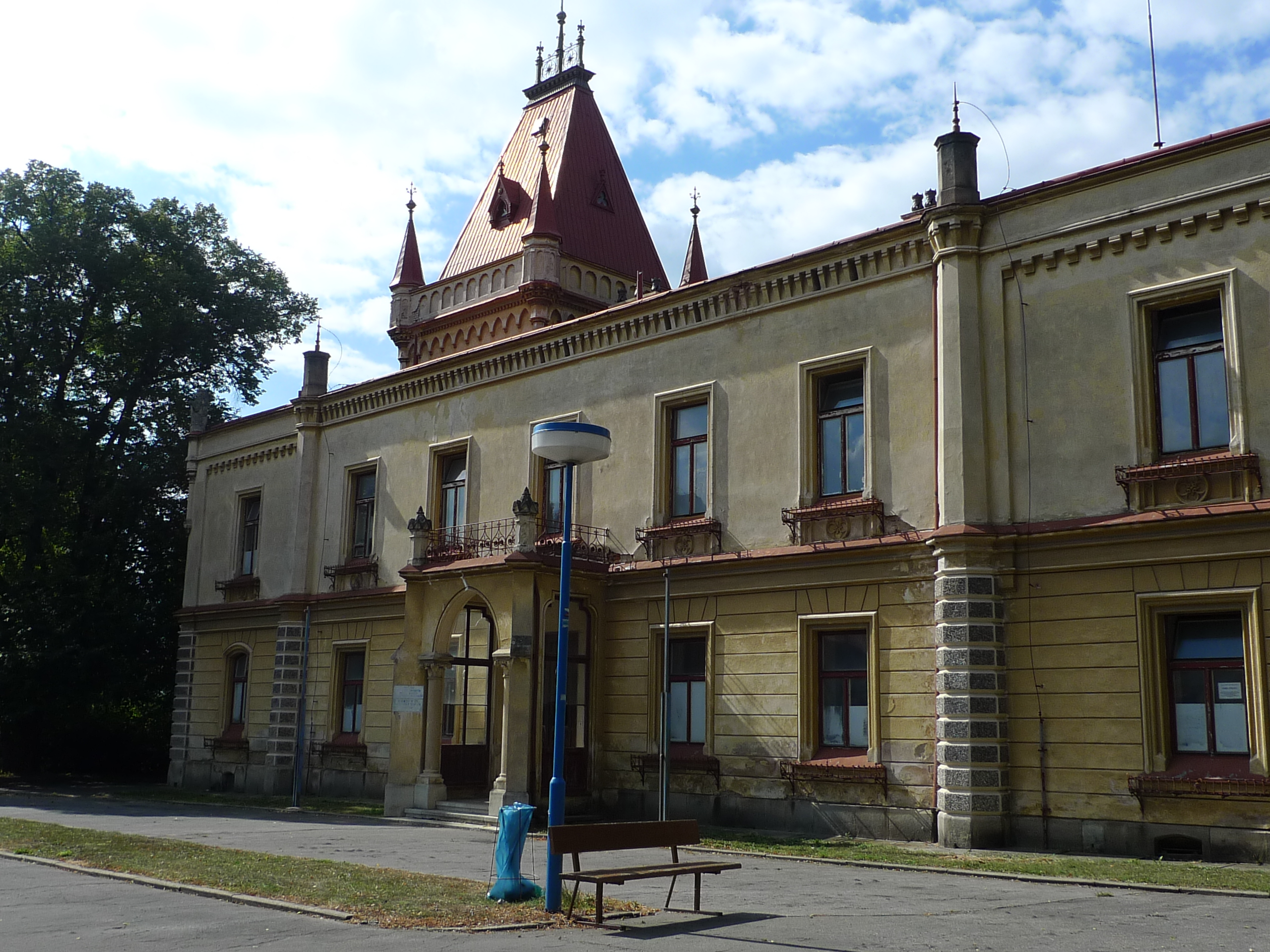
- Přílepy Castle

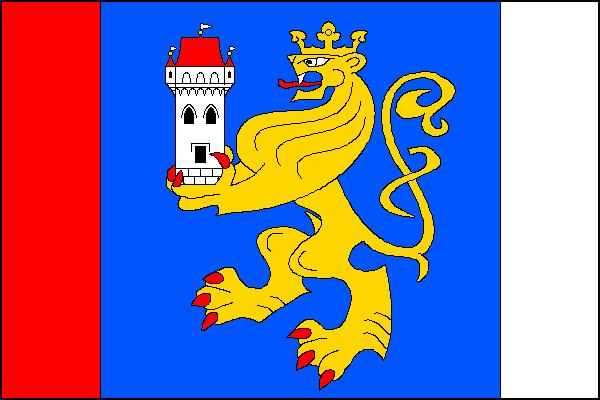
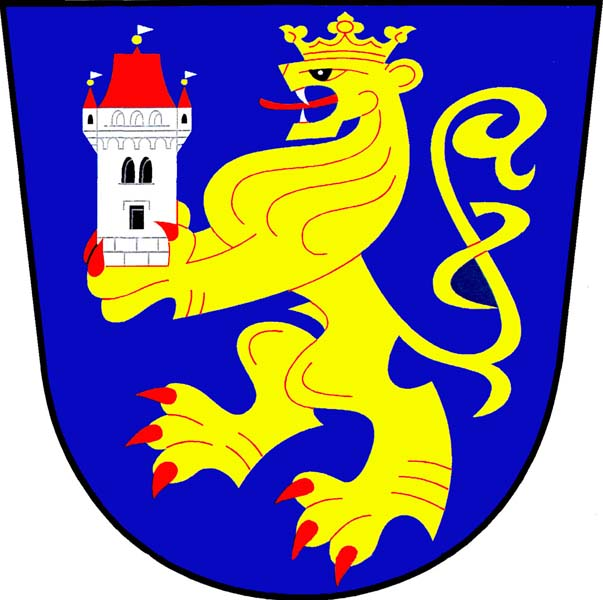
- Flag Coat of arms

- Location in the Czech Republic
- Coordinates: 49°19′12″N 17°36′57″E
- Country: Czech Republic
- Region: Zlín
- District: Kroměříž
- First mentioned: 1272

Area
  - Total: 3.18 km^{2} (1.23 sq mi)
- Elevation: 297 m (974 ft)

Population (2026-01-01)
  - Total: 1,012
  - Density: 318/km^{2} (824/sq mi)
- Time zone: UTC+1 (CET)
  - Summer (DST): UTC+2 (CEST)
- Postal code: 769 01
- Website: www.prilepy.cz

Přílepy (Czech pronunciation: [ˈpr̝̊iːlɛpɪ]) is a municipality and village in Kroměříž District in the Zlín Region of the Czech Republic. It has about 1,000 inhabitants.

== Geography ==
Přílepy is located about 16 kilometres (10 mi) east of Kroměříž and 11 km (7 mi) north of Zlín. It lies on the border of three geomorphological regions: Hostýn-Vsetín Mountains, Upper Morava Valley and Vizovice Highlands. The highest point is at 393 m (1,289 ft) above sea level. The Mojena Stream flows through the municipality.

== History ==
The first written mention of Přílepy is in a deed of King Ottokar II from 1272.

== Demographics ==
Historical population

Year	Pop.	±%
1869	512	—
1880	541	+5.7%
1890	540	−0.2%
1900	598	+10.7%
1910	664	+11.0%

Year	Pop.	±%
1921	672	+1.2%
1930	707	+5.2%
1950	734	+3.8%
1961	835	+13.8%
1970	801	−4.1%

Year	Pop.	±%
1980	810	+1.1%
1991	832	+2.7%
2001	834	+0.2%
2011	911	+9.2%
2021	962	+5.6%

Source: Censuses

== Transport ==
There are no railways or major roads passing through the municipality.

== Sights ==
The main landmark of Přílepy is the Přílepy Castle, surrounded by a valuable castle park. The castle was built in 1852 on the site of an old fortress. On the wooded slopes east of the castle stands the Chapel of the Assumption of the Virgin Mary, built in 1882.

== Notable people ==
- Bohumil Páník (born 1956), football manager
- Antonín Koláček (born 1959), entrepreneur
- Jaromír Zůna (born 1960), Czech army general and politician
- Zdeněk Grygera (born 1980), footballer
