= Milli Bus =

Afghan Government intercity bus service

- Millie Bus logo
- Type: State-owned
- Industry: Bus transport
- Founded: Kabul, Afghanistan
- Owner: Ministry of Transport and Civil Aviation

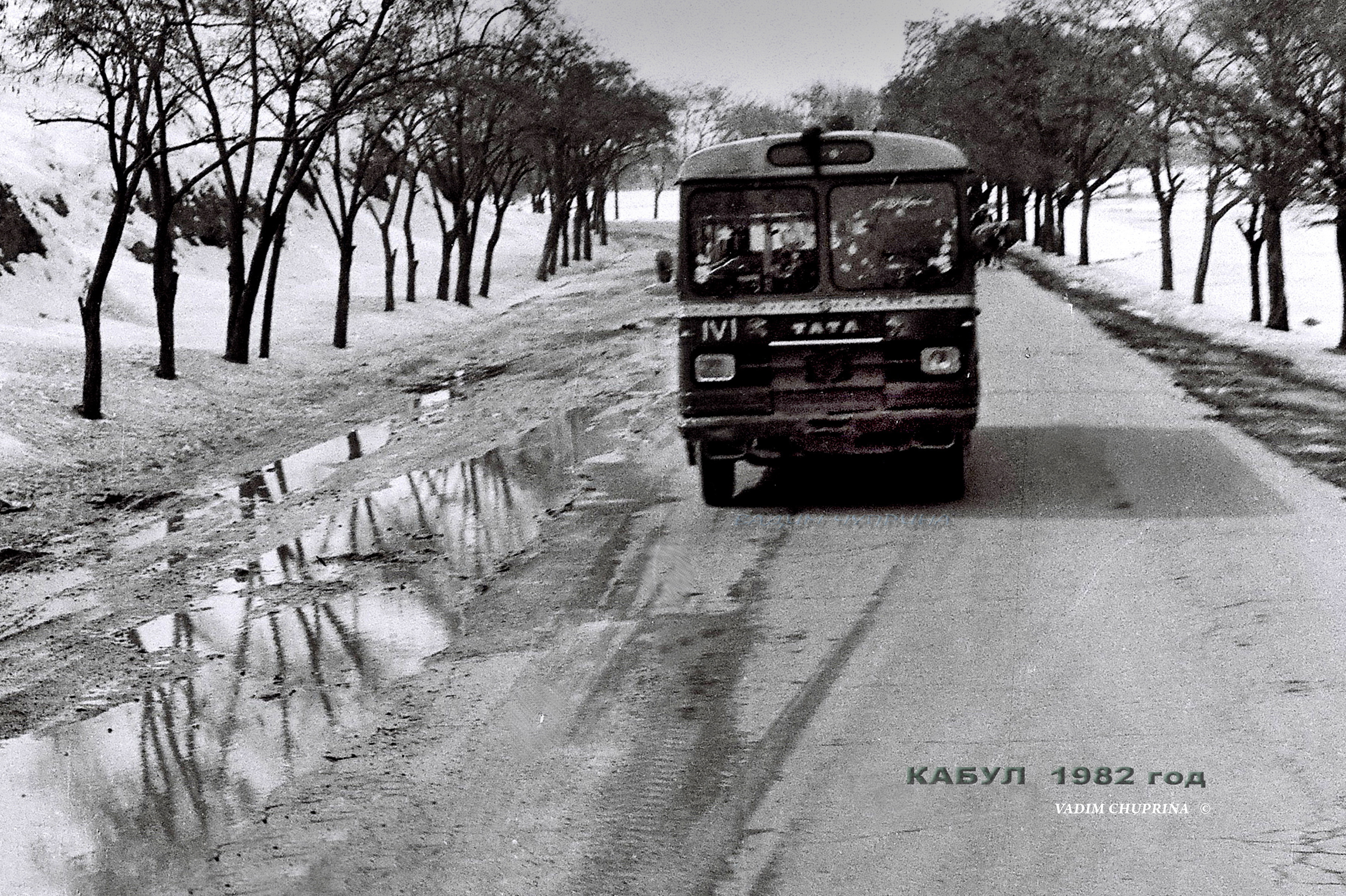
A Tata Millie Bus in Kabul, 1982

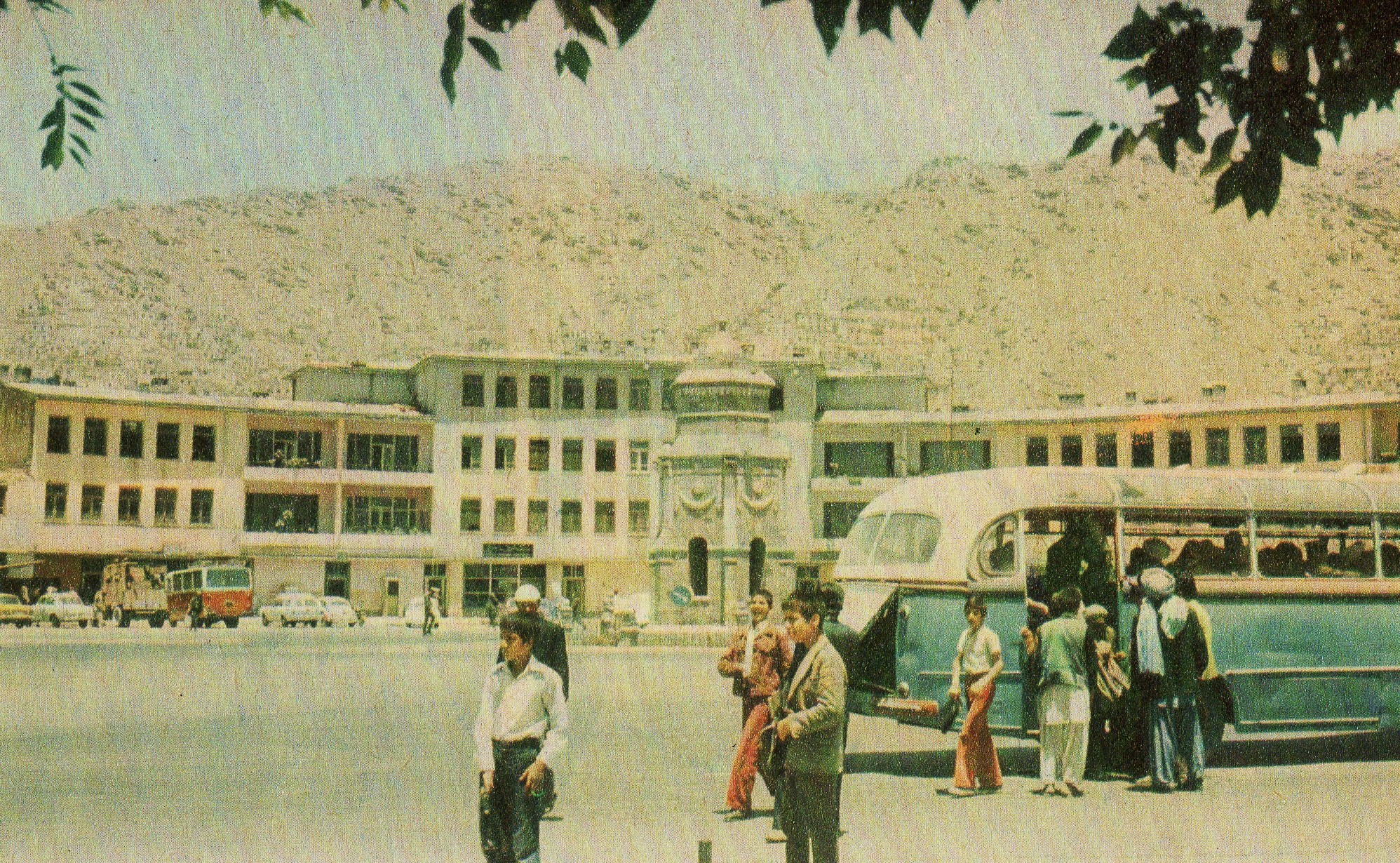
The back of a Millie Bus in Kabul, 1978

Millie Bus (Dari: ملی بس, Pashto: ملي بس, romanized: Millī Bas, lit, 'National Bus'), officially the Millie Bus Enterprise (Dari: تصدی ملی بس, romanized: Tasadī-ye Millī Bas; Pashto: د ملي بس تصدي, romanized: Də Millī Bas Tasadī, lit. 'National Bus Enterprise'), also spelled Milli Bus, is a government-run bus service operating across Afghanistan. Operations are managed by the Millie Bus Enterprise Directorate (Dari: ریاست تصدی ملی بس, romanized: Riyāsat-e Tasadī-ye Millī Bas; Pashto: د ملي بس د تصدي ریاست, romanized: Də Millī Bas Tasadī Riyāsat) under the Afghan Ministry of Transport and Civil Aviation.

== Operations ==
The Millie Bus Enterprise, which runs the service, operates services primarily in Kabul, along with services in other areas including Panjshir, Parwan, Kandahar, and Maidan Wardak.

Millie buses are among the cheapest mode of transport in Kabul, often resulting in overcrowding during peak hours.

== History ==
Millie Bus dates back to the late 1920s. In 1979 the company also operated a trolleybus system. The trolleybus network began development in 1976, under Mohammad Daoud Khan. Development was managed by, later Elektroline a.s. director, Jan Zrzavý in Kabul. Millie Bus' trolley line was inaugurated on February 2nd, 1979. The initial fleet of trolleybuses were 86 9Tr H23s, manufactured by Škoda Ostrov and provided by Czechoslovakia.

The infrastructure of Millie Bus including parking lots, workshops and administrative sections were destroyed after 1992 due to the outbreak of civil war in Kabul. It was reported that in 2001, after the Taliban regime ended, only 50 buses were operating in Kabul. Around 1000 buses were received as aid from India, Iran, Japan, and Pakistan over a period of a decade after the downfall of the former Taliban government. In 2014, it was reported that many of these buses were not operational as they had fallen into disrepair and since most of these buses were imported, the lack of spare parts hindered their repair operations. Under the National Institution Building Project of the United Nations Development Fund, a maintenance department was established and officers and engineers were given training in maintenance of buses as well as other fields such as drivers training by Indian automotive major Tata Motors.

In 2015, Millie Bus operations in Kabul were the subject of a documentary by Ariana Television Network.
