= Jacques de Groote =

Belgian financier and banker (1927–2024)

- Born: 25 May 1927
- Died: 21 September 2024 (aged 97)
- Occupations: Financier and banker

Jacques de Groote (25 May 1927 – 21 September 2024) was a Belgian financier and banker.

== Career ==
From 1973 to 1994, de Groote was one of the Executive Directors of the International Monetary Fund (IMF) and from 1973 to 1991, one of the governors of the World Bank (IBRD). He was then active in various international institutions, such as the International Finance Corporation (IFC) and International Development Association (IDA).

Traces of de Groote’s career can be found not only in Belgium, Switzerland, the Democratic Republic of the Congo and Rwanda, but in many of the former East Block countries, including the Czech Republic. He personifies the symbol of the IMF and World Bank of the 1970s and 1980s.

=== Academic career ===
From July 1955 to January 1957, de Groote was an assistant at Cambridge University. From 1963 to 1992, he taught at the Faculty of Economics of the University of Namur (Belgium) as a professor, lecturing on subjects related to money and credit theories, monetary mechanisms and current international finance issues. From 1963 to 1973, he took a professorship at the University of Leuven. From 1957 to 1960 and from 1963 to 1965, he was an assistant professor at Lille Catholic University, where he taught courses in structural economics and history of economic thought. de Groote holds an MA in economics from Cambridge University and a law, economics and political science degree from his alma mater at the University of Leuven.

=== Financier career ===
De Groote began his career as a financier in January 1957. In the first few months of 1960, serving as a secretary, he contributed to preparations for the de-colonisation of the Belgian Congo. From April 1960 to May 1963, he was an assistant to the Belgian representative at the International Monetary Fund and the World Bank in Washington, D.C. In May 1963, he joined the National Bank in Belgium, where he was active in international affairs. In July 1965, he was offered the position of financial advisor to the Belgian delegation at the OECD in Paris, where he headed a number of working groups involved in reviewing the first draft of multilateral agreements guaranteeing private investments. Between March 1966 and May 1969, he was economic advisor to the government of the president of the Democratic Republic of the Congo, where he was also a financial advisor to the country’s National Bank.

In 1973, de Groote became Executive Director of the IMF and World Bank. During this time, he actively supported certain African representations, working to have the IMF and the World Bank enter into closer economic cooperation with them. In addition to his work in the Congo, de Groote held the position of Director at the Research Department of the Belgian National Bank from April 1971 to November 1973. Within the IMF, where he was active until 1994, de Groote represented a group of countries that included Czechoslovakia, or, as the case may be, the Czech Republic.

== MUS case ==
The MUS affair concerns the fraudulent privatization of MUS (Mostecká Uhelná Spolecnost), one of the principal coal mines in the Czech Republic, which took place at the end of the 1990s. After his time at the World Bank and the IMF, de Groote began working with Stephen Norris, the co-founder of the investment group Carlyle Group. de Groote became the president of one of Norris’s companies, Appian Group, and was a member of the Board of Directors of Appian Group. As it turned out, de Groote used the Appian Group as a screen to effect illegal purchases of stock in MUS, disguising the true identity of the buyers who were, not the Appian Group, but five Czech managers of MUS. He admitted as much in a testimony he submitted on 12 June 2013 during the MUS trial before the Swiss Federal Criminal Court at Bellinzona. It was a crucial piece of evidence leading to the conviction and prison sentences for the five Czech managers while de Groote himself narrowly escaped prison. He was however found guilty of fraud, no doubt a first for a former Executive Director of the IMF.

De Groote left Appian Group in 2002.

== Death ==
De Groote died on 21 September 2024, at the age of 97.
