= Oldřich Klimecký =

Oldřich Klimecký (born 16 February 1940) Czech entrepreneur, researcher, manager, and former director of Mostecká uhelná společnost.

== Career ==
After graduating from VSB-Technical University of Ostrava (VSB-TUO), he spent most of his life devoted to brown-coal mining research in then Czechoslovakia. At VSB-TUO he also earned the academic title of CSc (a Doctoral-equivalent degree). After the Velvet Revolution in November 1989, he became the director of the Brown Coal Research Institute (Výzkumný ústav pro hnědé uhlí) in Most.

When the Czech Ministry of Industry and Trade began to address the very poor situation at Mostecká uhelná společnost (MUS) in 1995, it started looking for a new CEO for the mining company. The winner of the selection procedure was Oldřich Klimecký, who was tasked with restructuring MUS as quickly as possible, so that for the future Czech power supply, mining would continue on prospective sites only and end everywhere else.

Upon agreement with the representatives of the Ministry of Industry and Trade, the National Property Fund, the regions and major shareholders, all of whom were members of the Board of Directors of MUS, Oldřich Klimecký initiated fundamental changes in the management of the entire company and the company's transition to a market economy. In cooperation with the new management of MUS, he created new economic and business rules for MUS and succeeded in stabilising MUS within a few short years and securing its future.

Oldřich Klimecký has long been interest in the development of the entire Most region and has supported the development of the municipalities located there. Under his direction, MUS provided financial support in the tens of millions of crowns. He was also greatly involved in the construction of the Hippodrome, which was built on former mining dumps. The Hippodrome project in Most, which is part of the Velebudice land rehabilitation park, is one of the most important projects of the Czech land rehabilitation school.

Oldřich Klimecký has also long been engaged in politics in the Most region. He became a member of the Most municipal council in 1994, representing ODS. Oldřich Klimecký still lives in Most, now as a retiree and is no longer involved in either business or politics.

== MUS case ==
In October 2013, he was sentenced to 37 months in prison by the Swiss court of first instance in Bellinzona for fraud and money laundering in connection with Appian's purchase of a minority package of MUS shares from the Czech government in 1999. Due to his advanced age and poor health, he has not attended any of the court hearings, always using the possibility to be represented by an attorney. As all of his assets and even part of his old-age pension have been seized in the Czech Republic due to the criminal proceedings, he has to be represented by an attorney appointed to him ex officio. After 15 years of continuous investigation, Oldřich Klimecký has given up on exonerating himself, lives a secluded life, does not comment on the case and does not communicate with the media.
