= Jada-e Maiwand =

Road in Kabul, Afghanistan

Jada-e Maiwand or Jadah-e Maiwand (Dari: جاده میوند, Maiwand Road) is a major thoroughfare in the old center of Kabul, the capital of Afghanistan. The wide boulevard was built around 1948 as a modern main road cutting through the cluttered ancient alleyways. Although Kabul city has widely expanded since then, Jada-e Maiwand continues to be a popular shopping place for many residents, and links to plenty of old bazaars and markets, such as Mandawi and Ka Foroshi ('bird market') It runs from Cinema Pamir in the west to its eastern end, where it meets Chaman-e Hozori at a closed section of the roadway.

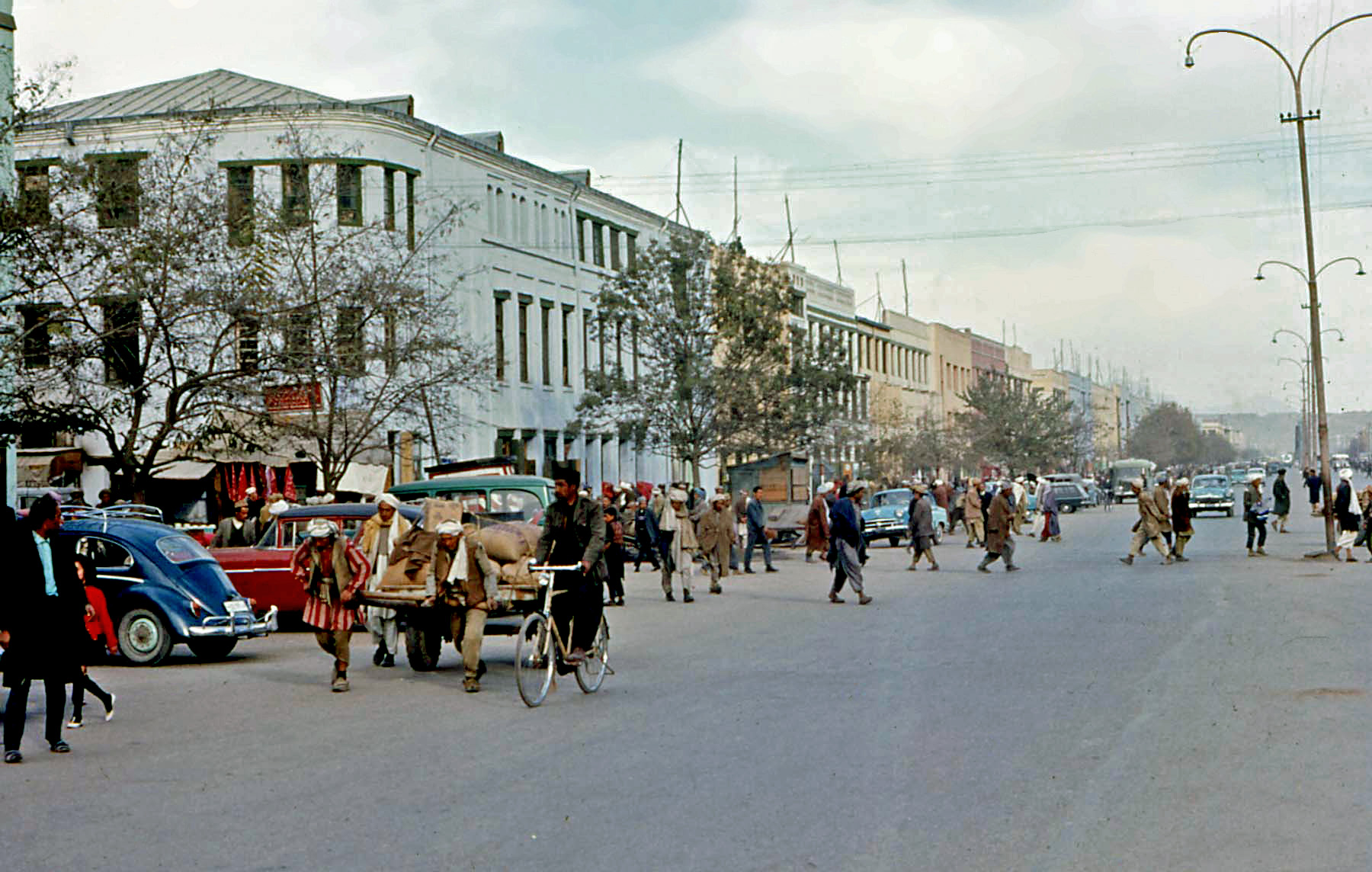
Maiwand Road in 1966

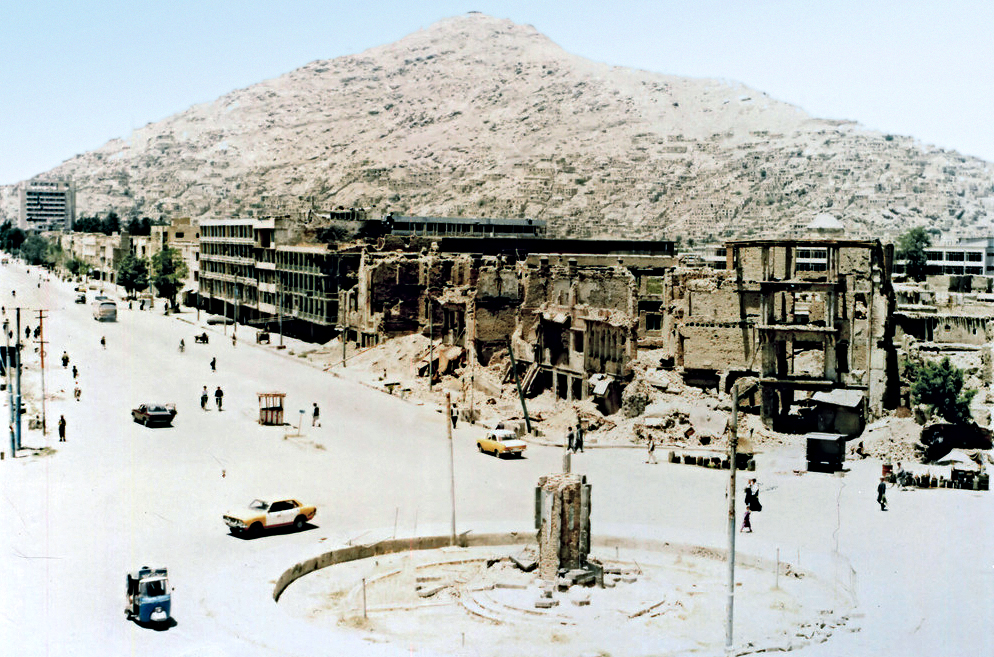
The circle at Maiwand Road in 1993 following the destruction caused by the Civil War

== Name ==
The avenue is named after the 1880 Battle of Maiwand, when the Afghans were victorious over the British in the Second Anglo-Afghan War. A victory monument was built at a circle in Maiwand Road in 1959.

== History ==
Maiwand Road was almost completely destroyed by 1994 due to the Civil War, being one of the worst damaged areas. Since the 2000s it has been rebuilt and become a busy commercial district once again.

Jada-e Maiwand is a major commercial street in Kabul PD1, Afghanistan. It runs from Cinema Pamir in the west to Chaman-e Hozori in the east, where the road is closed to through traffic. The area contains a variety of businesses, including shops, travel agencies, medical stores, and supermarkets.

Notable institutions and companies located along the street include Aziz Jamil Limited, Pashtany Bank, Da Afghanistan Bank, and travel service providers such as Paktia Tourist and Travel Agency, as well as Miwand Hospital.

The Mandawe situated on Jada-e Maiwand is recognized as one of Kabul’s leading commercial areas.

== War memorial ==
The Minaret of the Unknown Corps (Dari: منار سپاهی گمنام) commemorates the Afghan lives that were lost in the battle of 1880. It is named as such because the identities of many of the martyrs remained unknown. The blue minaret was built in the middle of the circle on Maiwand Road. The memorial was destroyed during the Battle of Kabul (1992–1996). It was rebuilt by 2005.
