= Jiří Diviš =

Jiří Diviš (born 16 March 1956) is a Swiss entrepreneur and manager originally from Czechoslovakia.

== Career ==
In the 1970s, he was played basketball for the teams Baník Most and Slavoj Vyšehrad. He emigrated to Switzerland in 1979 and studied law there. After completing his studies, he began working in an international consulting firm that advised small and medium enterprises in management, strategy and organisation. In the 1990s, he represented the Swiss company Investenergy S.A. in the Czech Republic. This company also purchased the shares of Mostecká uhelná společnost, a.s. (MUS) for Appian Group. Jiří Diviš came to MUS as an advisor to his childhood friend Luboš Měkota, Deputy Chairman of the Board of Directors of the company.

== MUS case ==
In the period 1998–2002, Jiří Diviš was a member of the Supervisory Board of Mostecká uhelná společnost (MUS). In 2003, together with Marek Čmejla, he coordinated the strategic entry of Appian Group into Škoda Plzeň, which company, following Lubomír Soudek's era, was in a state of clinical death. Appian Group purchased a part of the company for 350 million Czech crowns from the State and the remainder from the receiver in bankruptcy for 450 million crowns. Appian's entrance into Škoda Plzeň saved this traditional industrial manufacturer from demise. The company then underwent successful restructuring, and today is a leading producer of transportation systems. Since 2003, Diviš has been a member of the Supervisory Board of Škoda Plzeň.

In 2013, the court of first instance in Bellinzona sentenced him to 46 months in prison for fraud, money laundering and falsifying documents. He was to have committed these crimes when Appian purchased a minority share in MUS from the Czech State in 1999. He has appealed against this decision to the Federal Supreme Court of Switzerland in Lausanne (or, more precisely, he is preparing his appeal to the Federal Supreme Court in Lausanne).
