= Koht-e Sangi =

Coordinates: 34°51′N 69°12′E

Kote Sangi کوته سنگی
- Neighborhood of Kabul
- Country: Afganistan
- Province: Kabul

Kote Sangi (Dari: کوته سنگی) is a neighborhood and major intersection in western Kabul, Afghanistan, mostly part of District 5 with some parts in District 3. It is one of the city's most populated urban areas, located south of the Silo Road and west of Deh Bori and Kabul University. The roads link it to Afshar, Darulaman, Paghman and downtown Kabul. To the south-west are shanty areas nearby Dasht-e Barchi. In 2011 the country's first skyway, Kote Sangi Bridge, was built there which is 650 m long and 14 m high. Its location is centered on Mirwais Maidan.

== See also ==
- Neighborhoods of Kabul
- Mirwais Maidan
