= Petr Kraus =

Czech manager and entrepreneur

Petr Kraus (born 10 November 1966) is a Czech entrepreneur, manager, and founder of Newton group.

== Career ==
In 1994, he and Antonín Koláček founded Newton Financial Management Group, a company that focused on trading on the financial markets and related advisory services. In the 1990s, he took part in the restructuring and management of numerous industrial enterprises and financial institutions, at home and abroad. The most important projects at the time included Všeobecný vzájemný penzijní fond (General Mutual Pension Fund, today ING Pension Fund), the Otrokovice heat generation plant and the Newton Media.

Kraus invested a significant amount of finances in educating and supporting university students. In 2003, he founded Newton College. In the framework of such efforts, he then initiated the establishment of the Erudikon Endowment Fund in 2005 to provide university access to those individuals whose life situation would otherwise make it impossible.

== MUS case ==
He ended close cooperation with MUS already in 2002; nevertheless, the Swiss courts found him guilty (verdict not final) from alleged money laundering. As a result of the Swiss charges and the re-opening of the MUS case by the Czech authorities in 2012, his current accounts were frozen and his assets, including the home in which he was living, were seized.

Since the very beginning of the investigation, Kraus has argued that he, like the rest of the sentenced entrepreneurs and managers, saved MUS and thus it was absurd to criminalise their efforts. Even with regard to the fact that MUS is, thanks to the then successful restructuring, a stable and important company employing thousands of people.

On Sunday, 20 October 2013, he proclaimed the following about MUS on the Czech Television programme Otázky Václava Moravce [Question Time with Václav Moravec]: "This is a dispute about the form that the transformation of the Czech economy took. It is a dispute that should not be relegated to the offices of prosecutors, but aired out in the public domain to allow discussion on whether the process should have taken place as it had."
