= Low-floor tram =

Tram that has no steps between the entrances and the passenger cabin

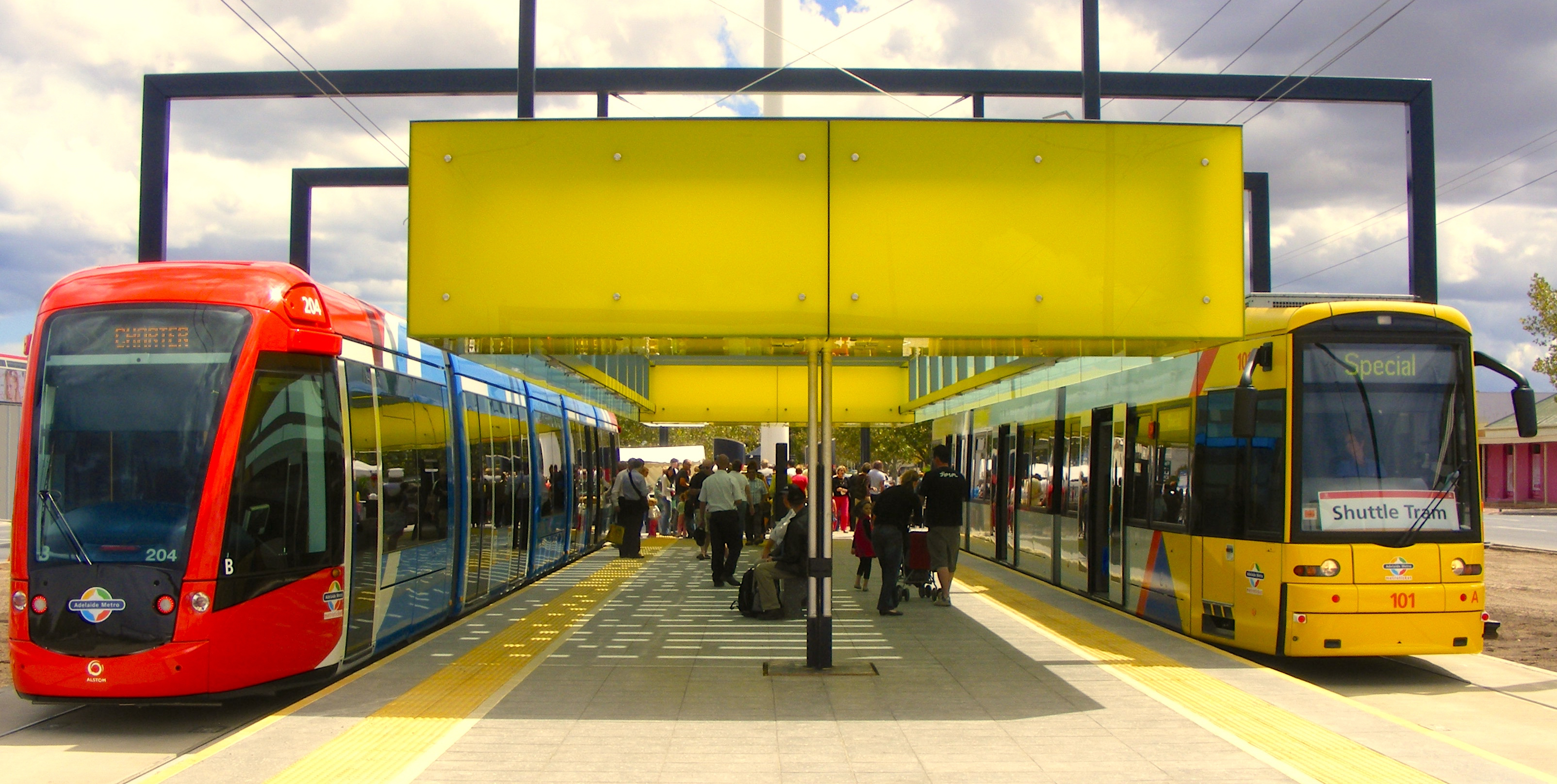
Two low floor trams, an Alstom Citadis 302 and a Bombardier Flexity Classic, in Adelaide, South Australia

A low-floor tram is a tram that has no steps between one or more entrances and part or all of the passenger cabin. The low-floor design improves the accessibility of the tram for the public, and also may provide larger windows and more airspace.

An accessible platform-level floor in a tram can be achieved either by using a high-floor vehicle serving high-platform tram stops, or with a true low-floor vehicle interfacing with curb level stops.

Currently both types are in use, depending on the station platform infrastructure in existing rail systems. Some systems may make use of former railway alignments where use of existing high platforms is desirable, while others, particularly new systems, may not have the space to site high-level stops in urban centres.

== Low-floor tram configurations ==
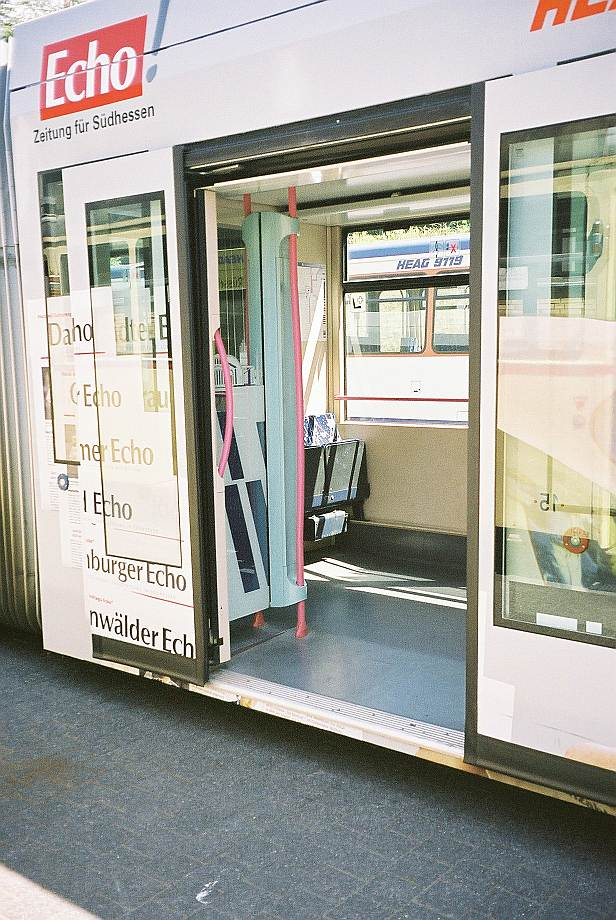
Entry door of a low-floor tram, with "roll-in" level floor accessibility.

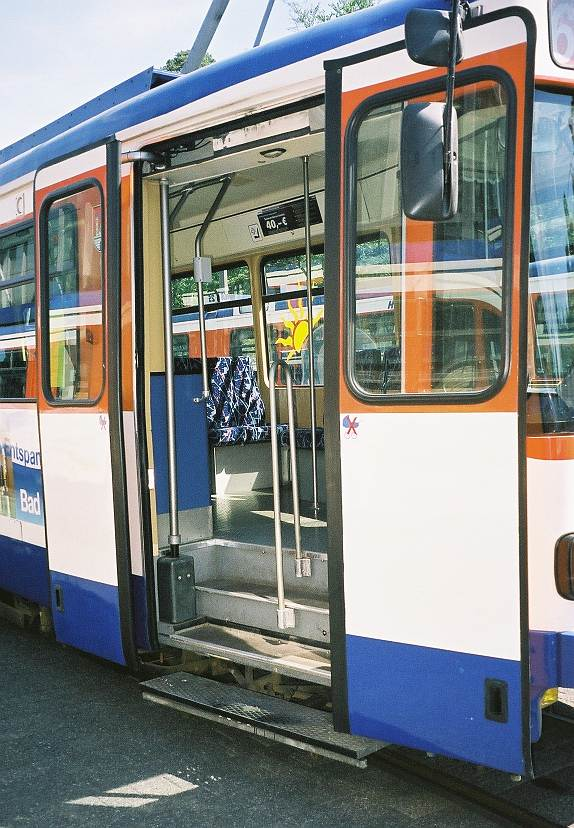
Entry door of a high-floor tram. Steps are visible just inside the door.

Trams traditionally had high floors, and articulated tram designs evolved with low-floor centre sections. Examples of this design are Amsterdam 11G/12G-trams and the Kusttrams in Belgium.

Arrangement of essential components in a high-floor tram and a low-floor one.

The most common design of 100% low floor vehicles is the multi-articulated design. This uses short carbody sections for the wheels with longer sections between them. Examples of this are the Alstom Citadis and Combino. A different design was developed by MAN. In 1990 the GT6N was the first 100% low-floor tram. These trams are found in ten German cities (such as Bremen and Munich) and in the Swedish city Norrköping. Other designs are only partially low floor, with high floors over the bogies at the outer ends and single axle bogies under the low-floor centre section. North American light rail type vehicles frequently have a similar configuration but with a centre bogie designed to accommodate a low floor situated under a short centre section.

In Vienna, Ultra Low Floor (ULF) Trams can "kneel" at the curbside, reducing the height from the road to only 180 mm (7.1 in).

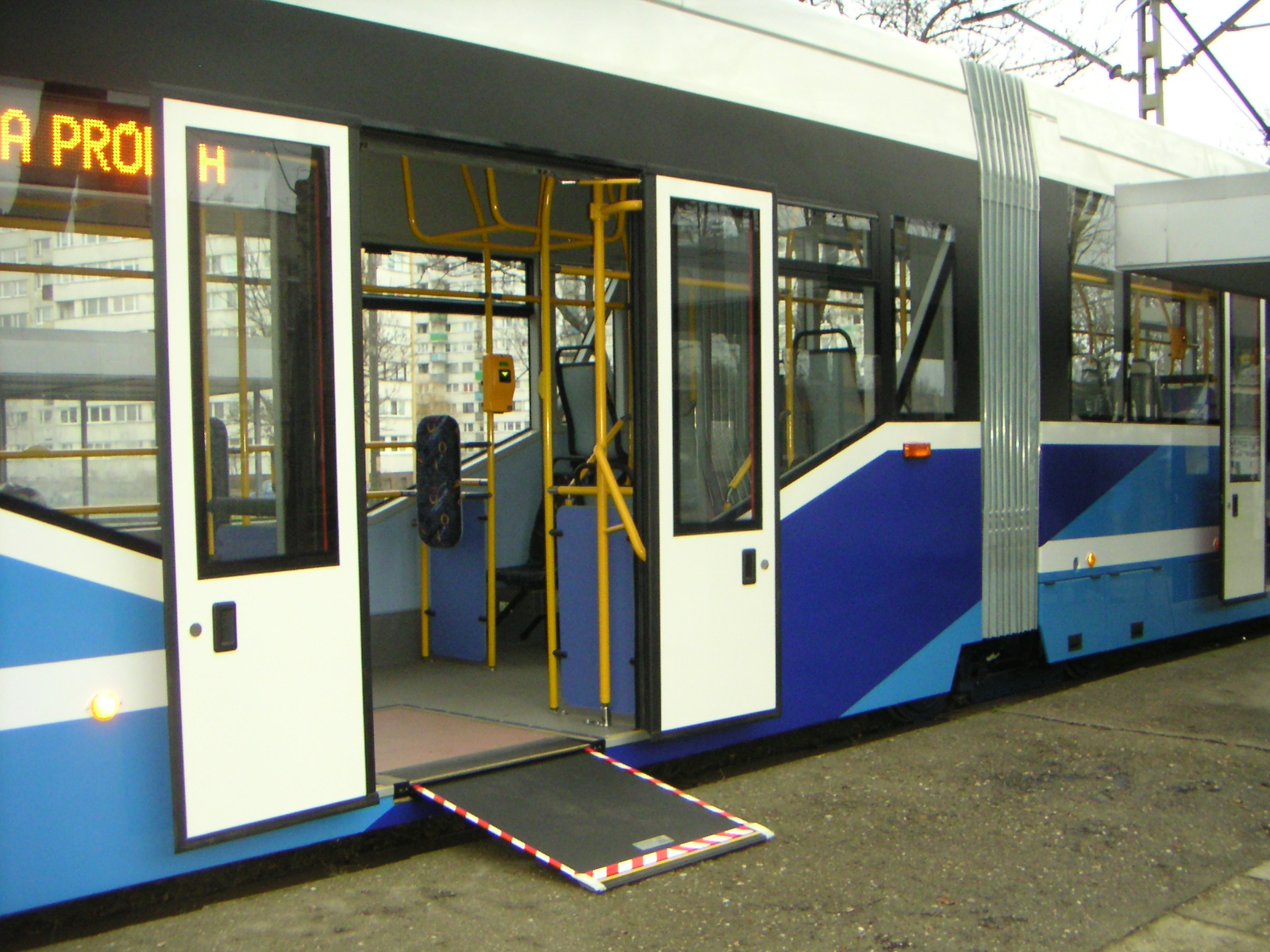
Wheelchair access ramp in Protram 205 WrAs tram. Low floor is approximately 360 mm (14 in) high

Some public transport companies have both low floor and high floor trams. They report that low floor trams have 15% higher maintenance costs for the rolling stock, and 20% higher maintenance costs for the infrastructure on average.

Many low-floor trams have fixed bogies which increase track wear and tear, while decreasing the speed at which a tram can drive through a curve (usually 4–15 km/h (2.5–9.3 mph) in 20 m (66 ft) radius curve). The Škoda ForCity and the newest Alstom Citadis X04 try to counter the effect with pivoting bogies while maintaining 100% low floor design. Prior to the new design, pivoting bogies could only be used under high floors, hence such trams could only be part low-floor, with high-floor sections over the pivoting bogies.

== Historic examples ==
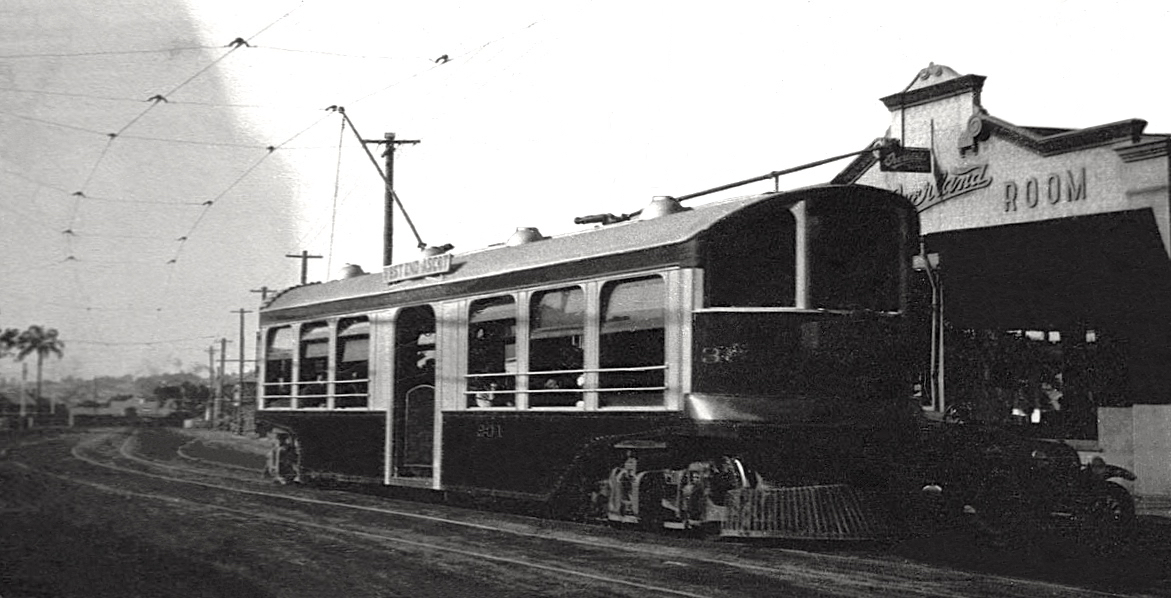
Brisbane Hedley-Doyle Stepless tram, No. 301

The idea of a low-floor tram dates back to the early 20th century when a number of trolley systems began experimenting with various "stepless" designs. Perhaps the most notable is the Hedley-Doyle Stepless car introduced in 1912 for use on Broadway in Manhattan. A number of other cities also purchased Hedley-Doyle Stepless trams after seeing their success in Manhattan. Since these cars had a unique appearance compared to any other trams running at the time, they earned a number of nicknames, including hobble skirt cars, public welfare cars, and sow bellies.

== Typical floor heights ==
Typical floor heights of low-floor trams are 300 to 350 mm (11.8 to 13.8 in), and the Ultra Low Floor tram has a floor height of only 180 mm (7.1 in). For comparison high-floor trams are typically more than 600 mm (23.6 in) and rapid transit using heavy rail trains has floor heights of 800 to 1,200 mm (31.5 to 47.2 in).

== List of low-floor trams by country manufactured and manufacturers ==
=== Belarus ===
Belkommunmash

- AKSM-743 - Third Generation tram on Minsk tramway
- AKSM-843 - Fourth generation tram on Minsk tramway

=== Canada ===
Bombardier Transportation

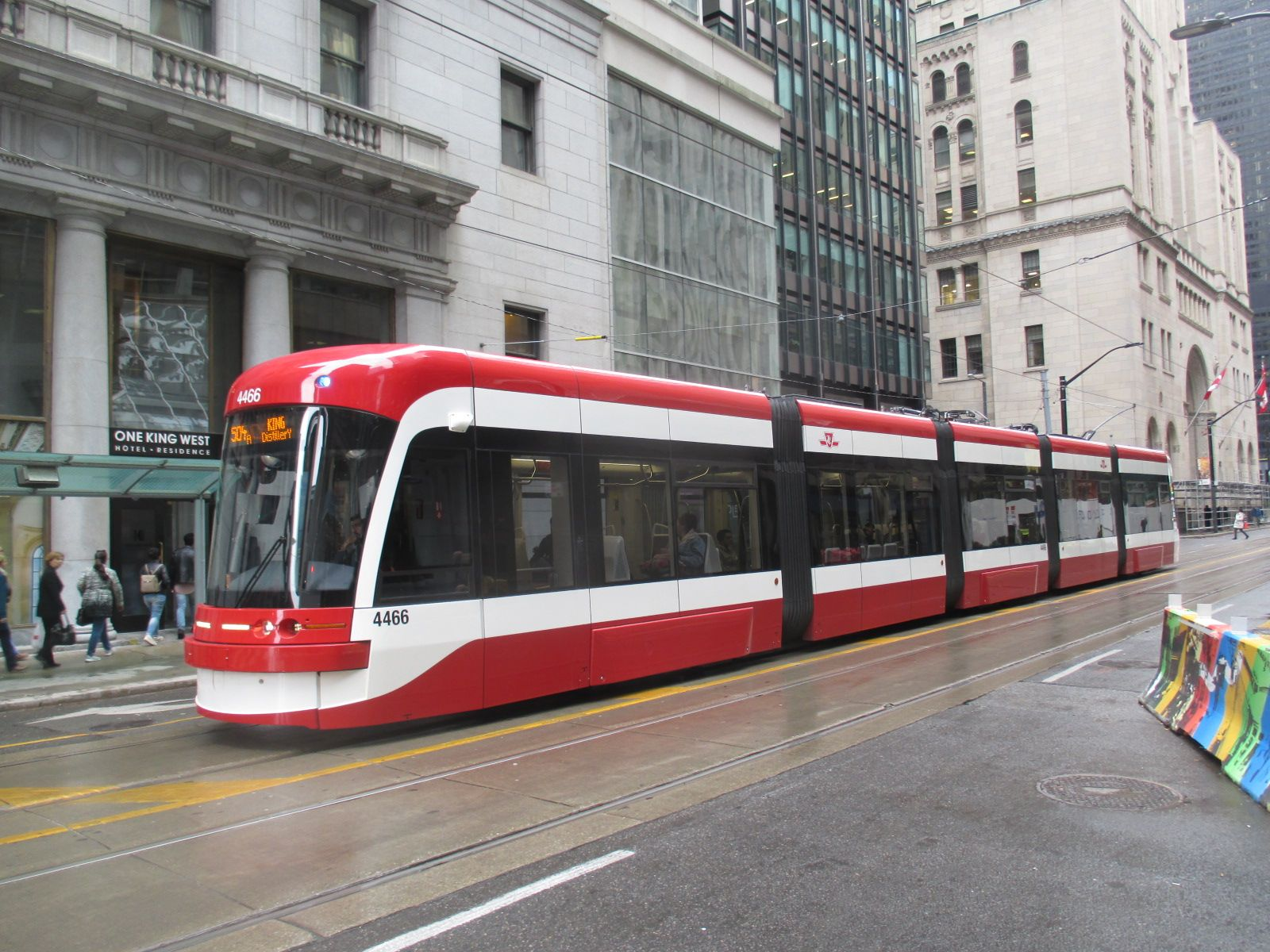
Flexity Outlook in Toronto

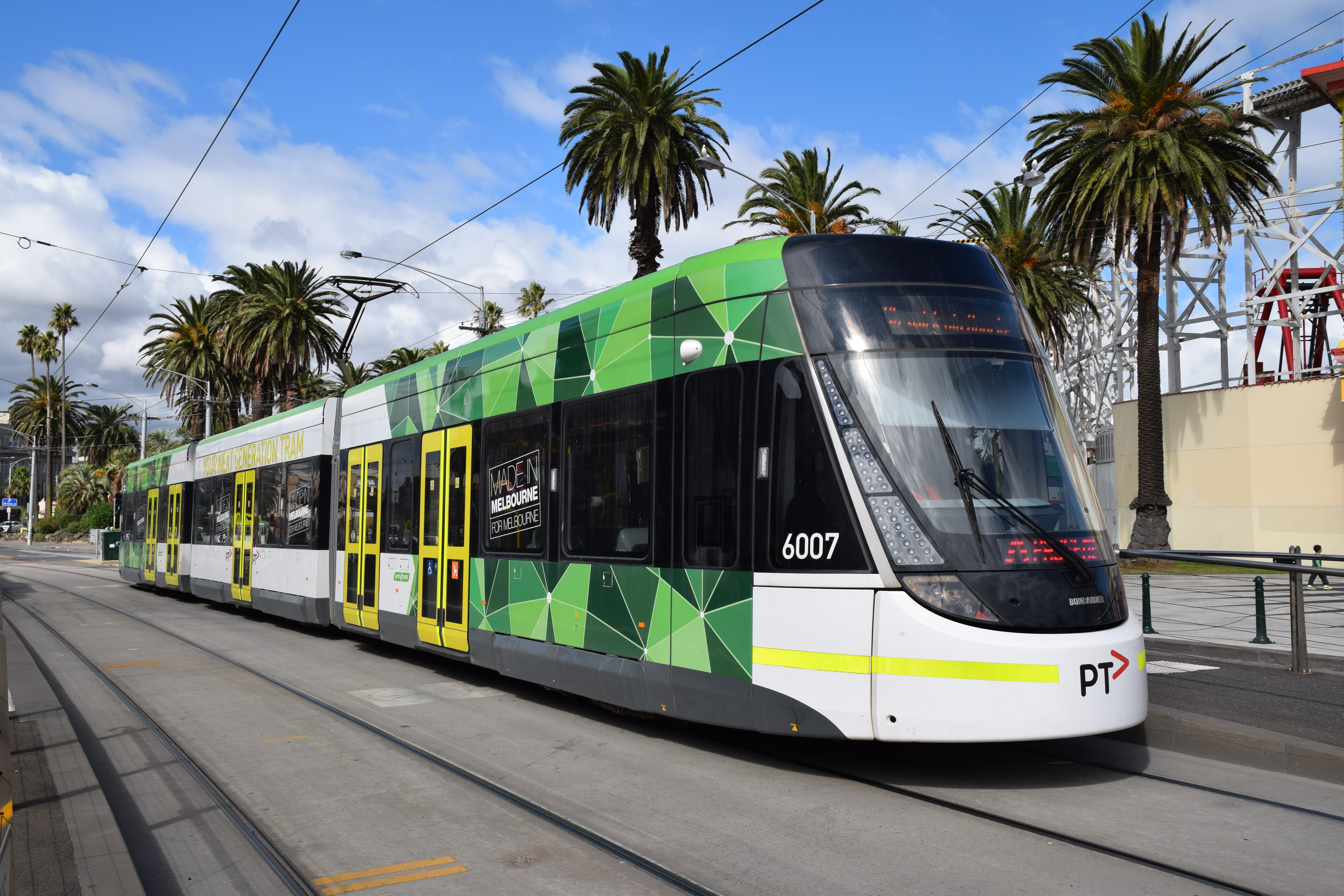
E-class Melbourne tram

- Zürich Cobra
- Flexity 2, including the model for Blackpool
- Flexity Classic
- Flexity Freedom
- Flexity Link
- Flexity Swift, only some models, including Melbourne E Class and Croydon CR4000
- Flexity Outlook Eurotram
- Flexity Outlook Cityrunner, including the model for Toronto
- Incentro, including Flexity Berlin and Nottingham AT6/5
- Brussels T2000
- Bombardier Variobahn

=== Croatia ===
Crotram

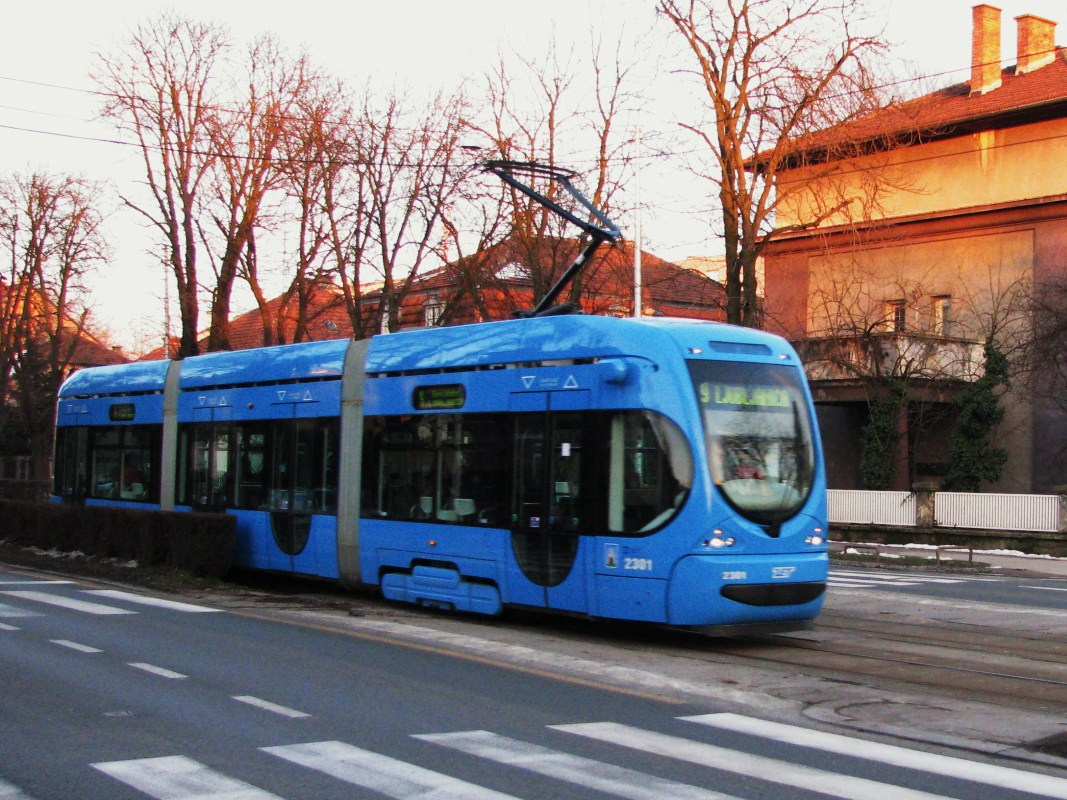
TMK 2200-K in Zagreb

- TMK 2200
- TMK 2200 K
- TMK 2300
- TMK 2400

=== Czech Republic ===
ČKD Tatra

- K3R-N / K3R-NT (reconstruction with low-floor middle section)
- KT8D5N (with low-floor middle section)
- KT8D5R.N1 / KT8D5R.N2 / KT8D5R.N2P (reconstruction with low-floor middle section)
- KTNF6 / KTNF8 (reconstruction of KT4 with low-floor middle section)
- RT6N1 / RT6N2
- RT6S
- Satra III (reconstruction with low-floor middle section)

Aliance TW Team

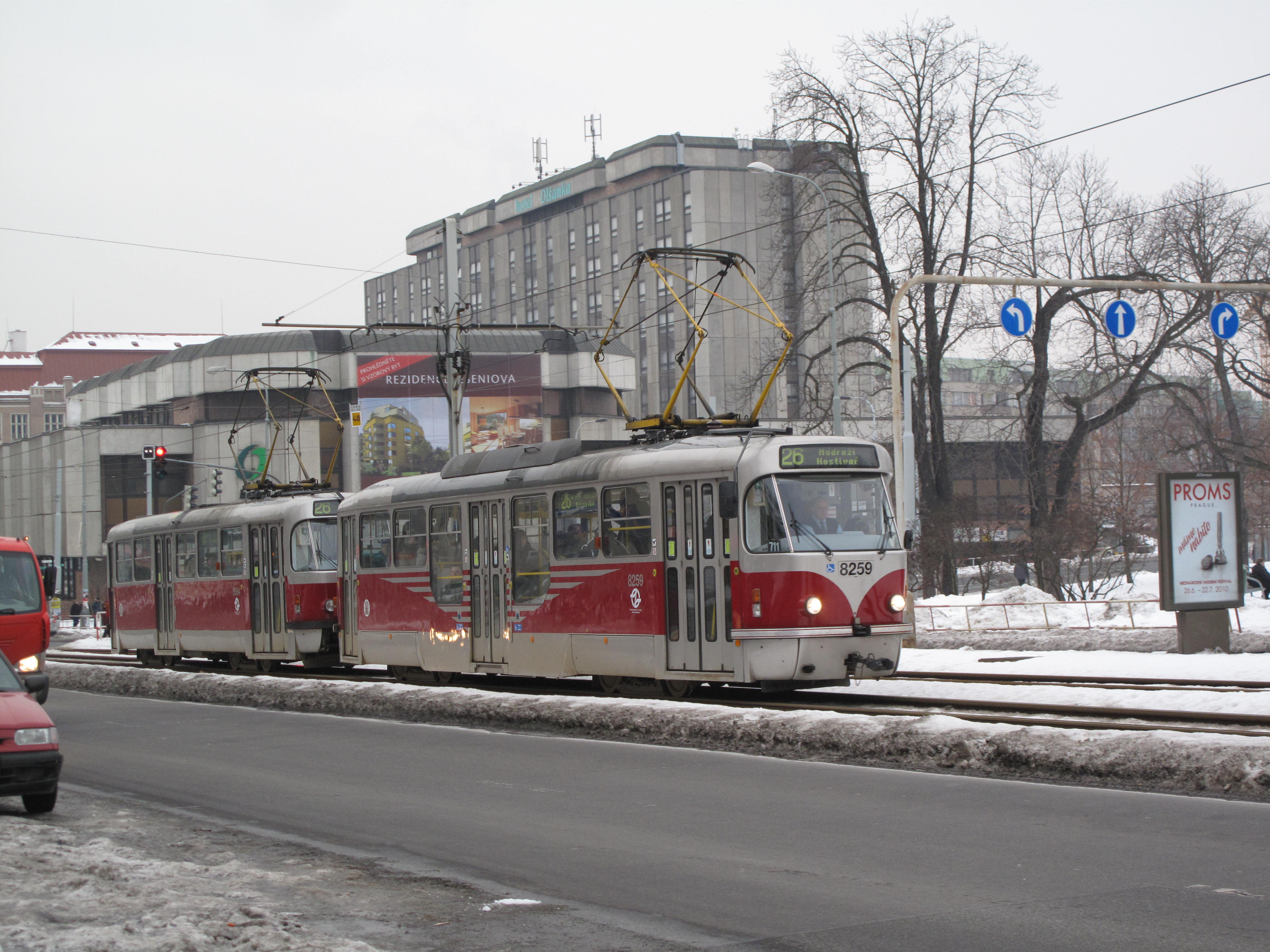
Tatra T3R.PLF (first car) in Prague

- Tatra T3R.PLF / Tatra T3R.SLF (nicknamed "wana" (Czech for 'bath') - newly built with low-floor middle section)
- VarioLF / VarioLF plus / VarioLF plus/o ("wana")
- VarioLF2 / VarioLF2 plus / VarioLF2/2 IN
- VarioLF3 / VarioLF3/2
- EVO1
- EVO2
- VV60LF (trailer)

Škoda Transportation

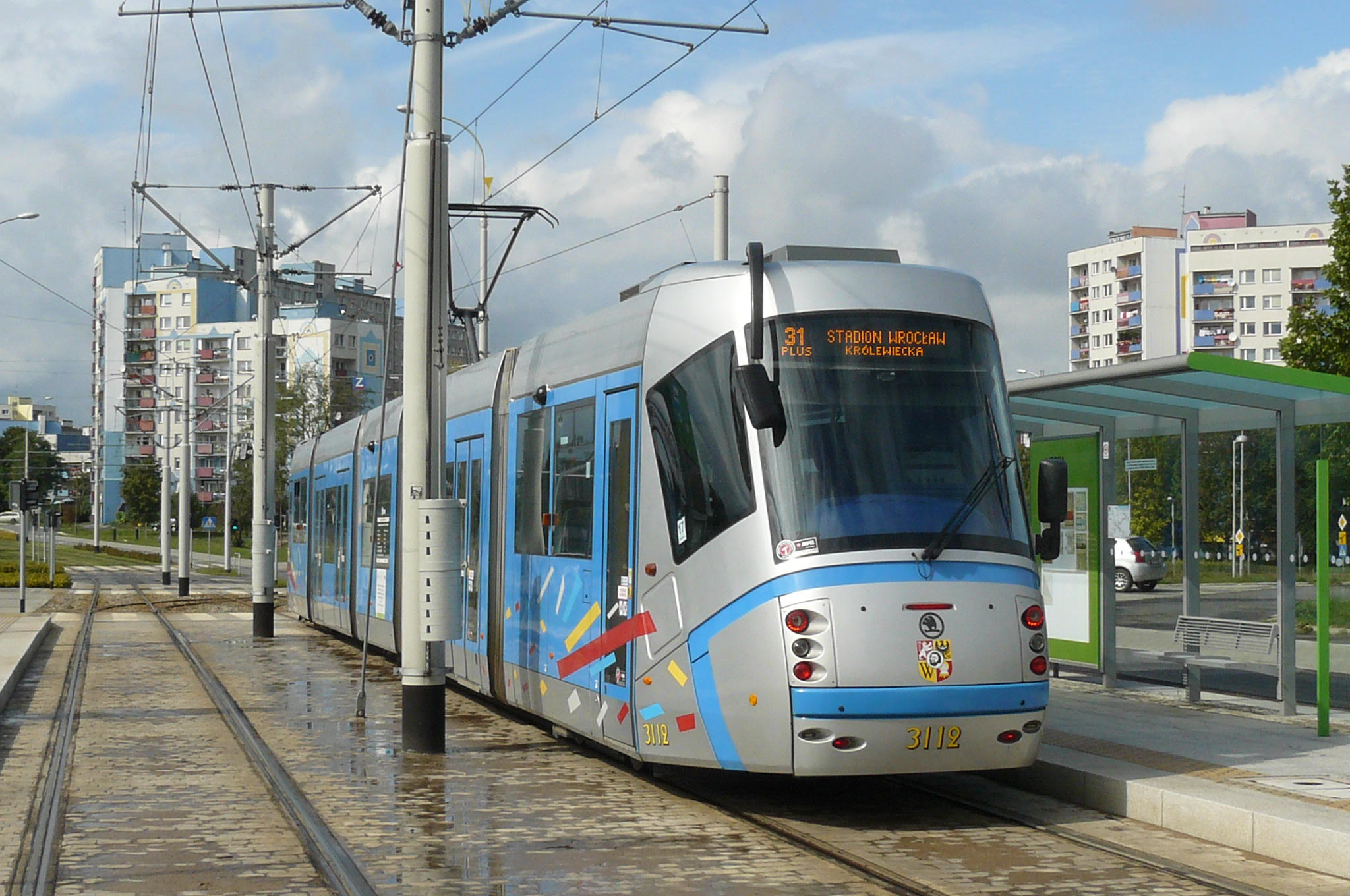
Škoda 19T Electra in Wrocław

- 03T Astra/Anitra
- 05T Vektra
- Elektra 06T, 10T, 13T, 14T, 16T and 19T
- ForCity Alfa 15T
- ForCity Classic, including 26T, 28T and 35T
- ForCity Plus, including 29T, 30T and 52T
- ForCity Smart Artic

Inekon Trams

- 01 Trio / 12 Trio

=== France ===
Alstom

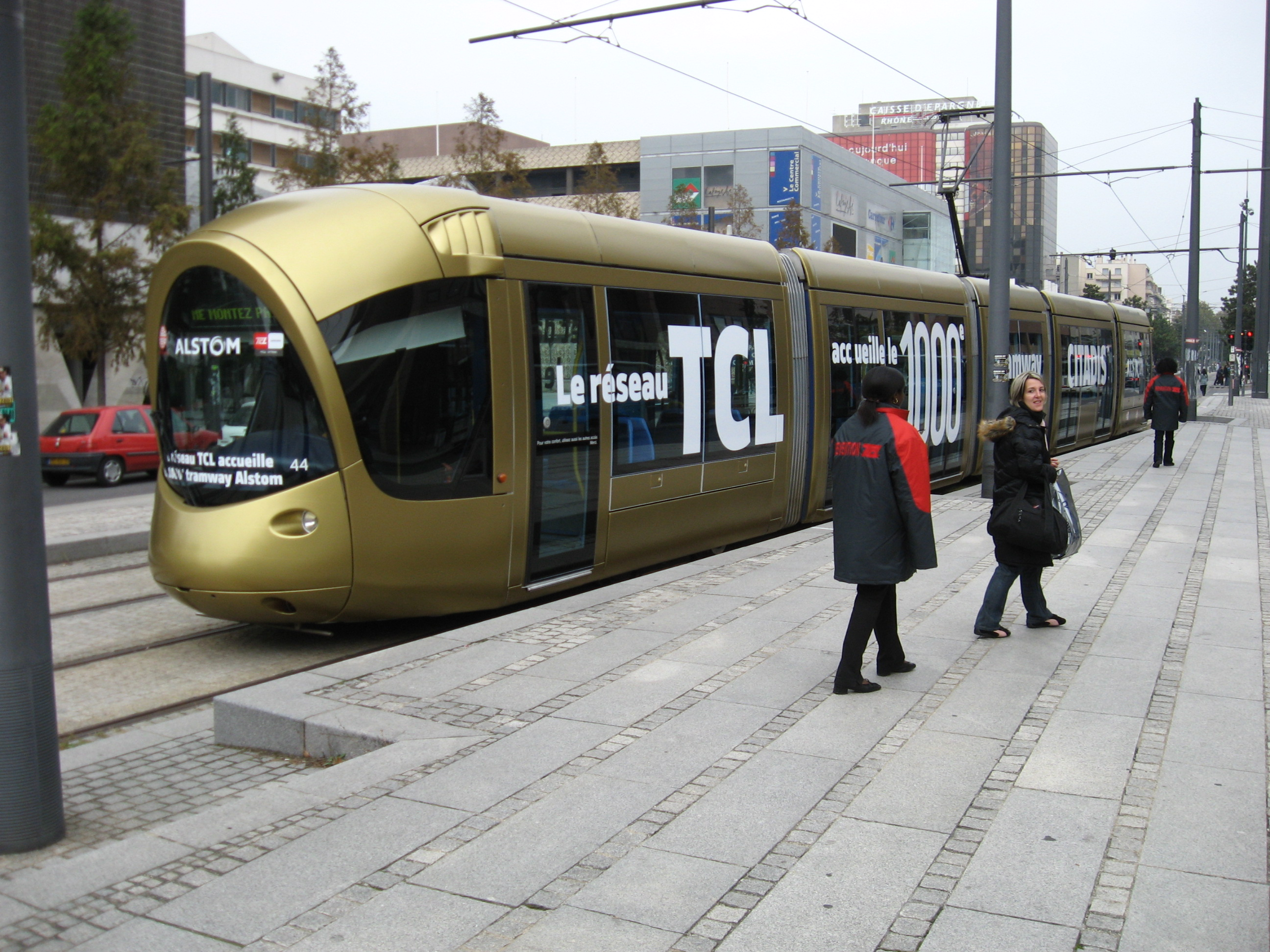
Citadis 302 in Lyon

- ATM Class 6000
- Citadis 100
- Citadis X01 (301, 401 and 301 CIS/71-801)
- Citadis X02 (202, 302, 402 and 502), including Melbourne C Class and C2 Class
- Citadis 403
- Citadis X04 (304)
- Citadis X05 (205/Compact, 305, 405)
- Regio-Citadis (tram-train)
- Citadis Dualis (tram-train)
- Citadis Spirit
- Tramway Français Standard TFS-1 (with low-floor centre section added at a later date) and TFS-2
- Translohr vehicles

=== Germany ===
Allgemeine Elektricitäts-Gesellschaft AG (AEG)

- ATAC Class 9000

Duewag

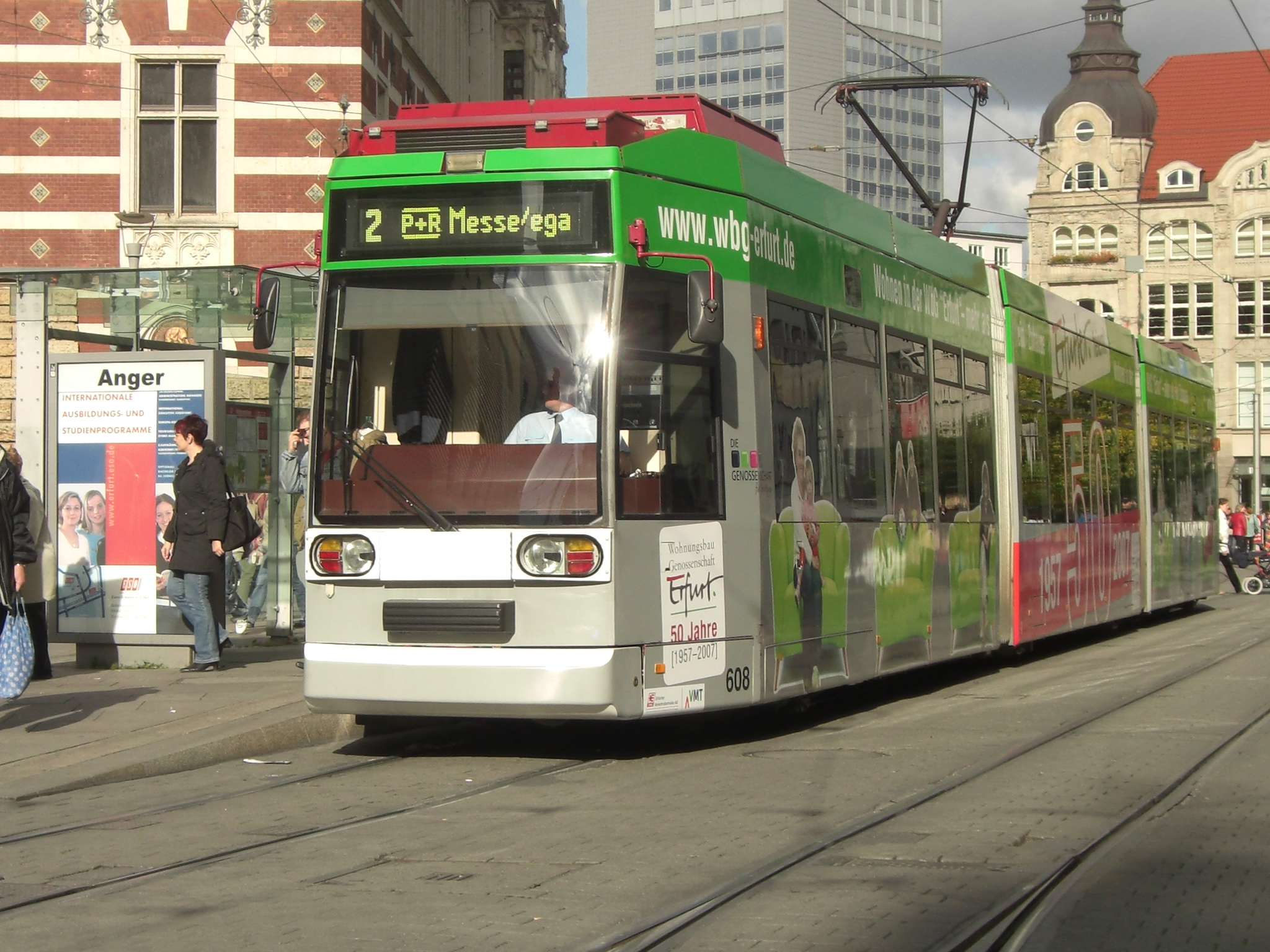
MGT6D in Erfurt

- Geneva Be 4/6 and Be 4/8
- GT8N (with low-floor middle section)
- GT8Z (with 73% low-floor)
- Duisburg GT10 NC-DU (reconstruction with low-floor middle section)
- MGT6D
- M97 (reconstruction with low-floor middle section)
- Sheffield Supertram
- 6MGT / 8MGT

MAN

- Nuremberg N8S-NF (reconstruction with low-floor middle section)

Siemens

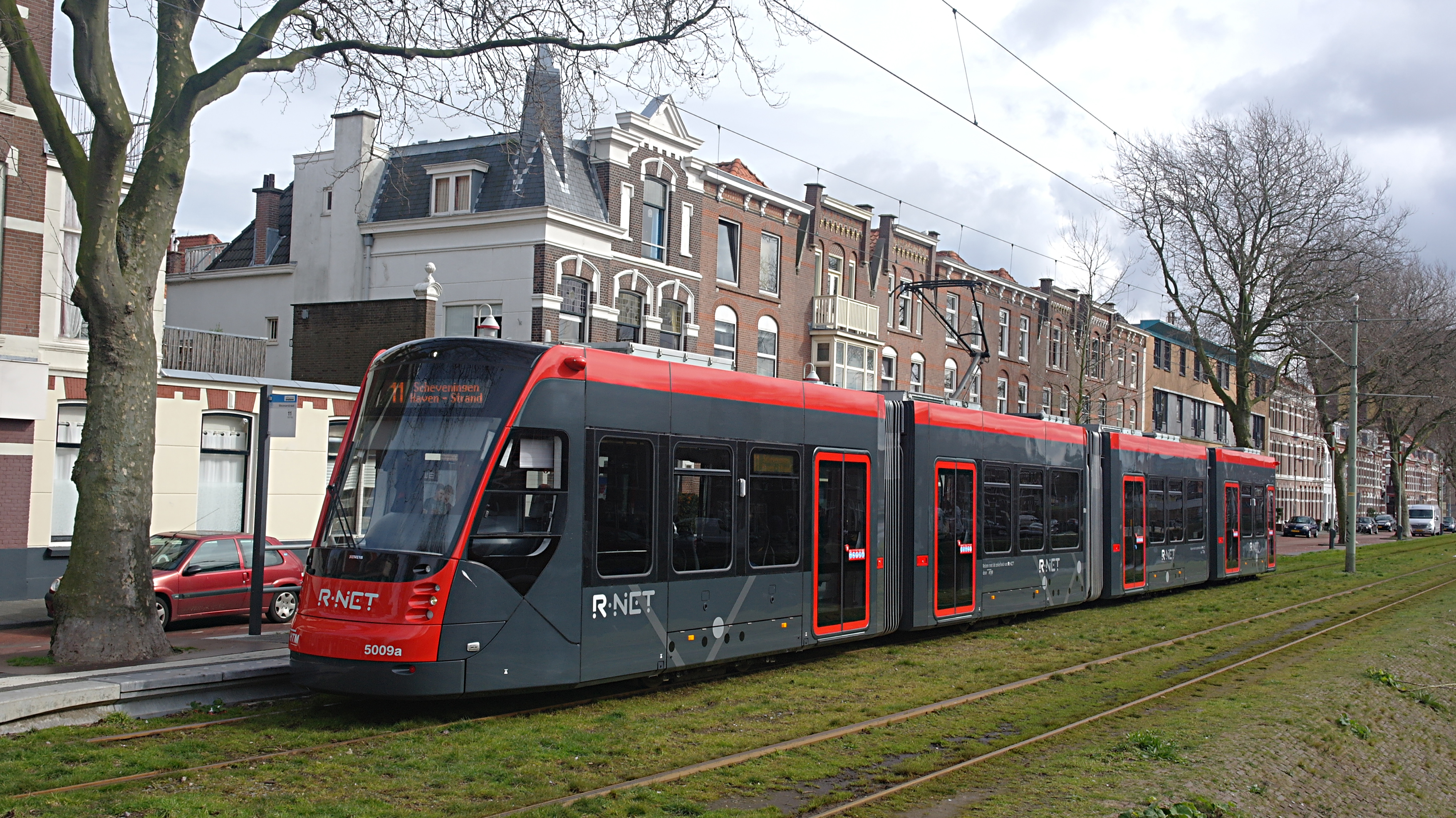
Avenio in The Hague

- Avenio (previously Combino Plus/Supra)
- Avenio M (previously Combino), including Melbourne D class
- Frankfurt am Main type R tram
- GTx-70D/N (Karlsruhe: GT6-D/N, GT8-D/N – Valencia: FGV 3800 – Lisbon: CCFL 500)
- S700 and S70 (also known as Avanto)
- Ultra Low Floor (ULF)

Adtranz

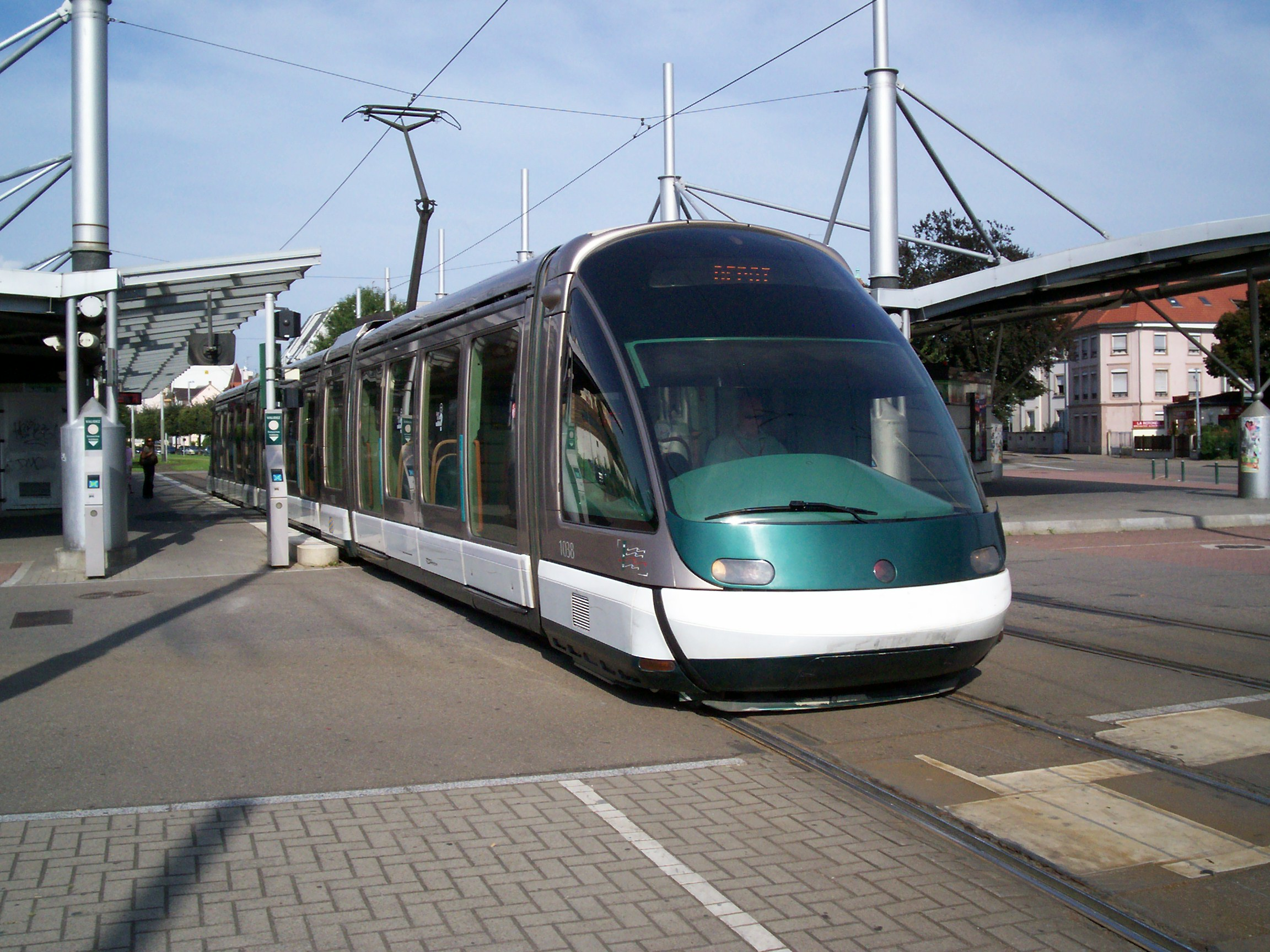
Eurotram in Strasbourg

- Eurotram
- GTxN/M/S
- Variobahn

Stadler Pankow

- Variobahn, including Munich Class S

=== Italy ===
AnsaldoBreda

- ATM Class 5000
- Sirio
- Oslo SL95
- West Midlands Metro T-69
- Boston Type 8 Trolley

Fiat Ferroviaria

- ATM Class 5000
- Fiat Cityway

Società Costruzioni Industriali Milano (Socimi)

- ATAC Class 9000
- Eurotram

=== Japan ===
Alna Sharyo

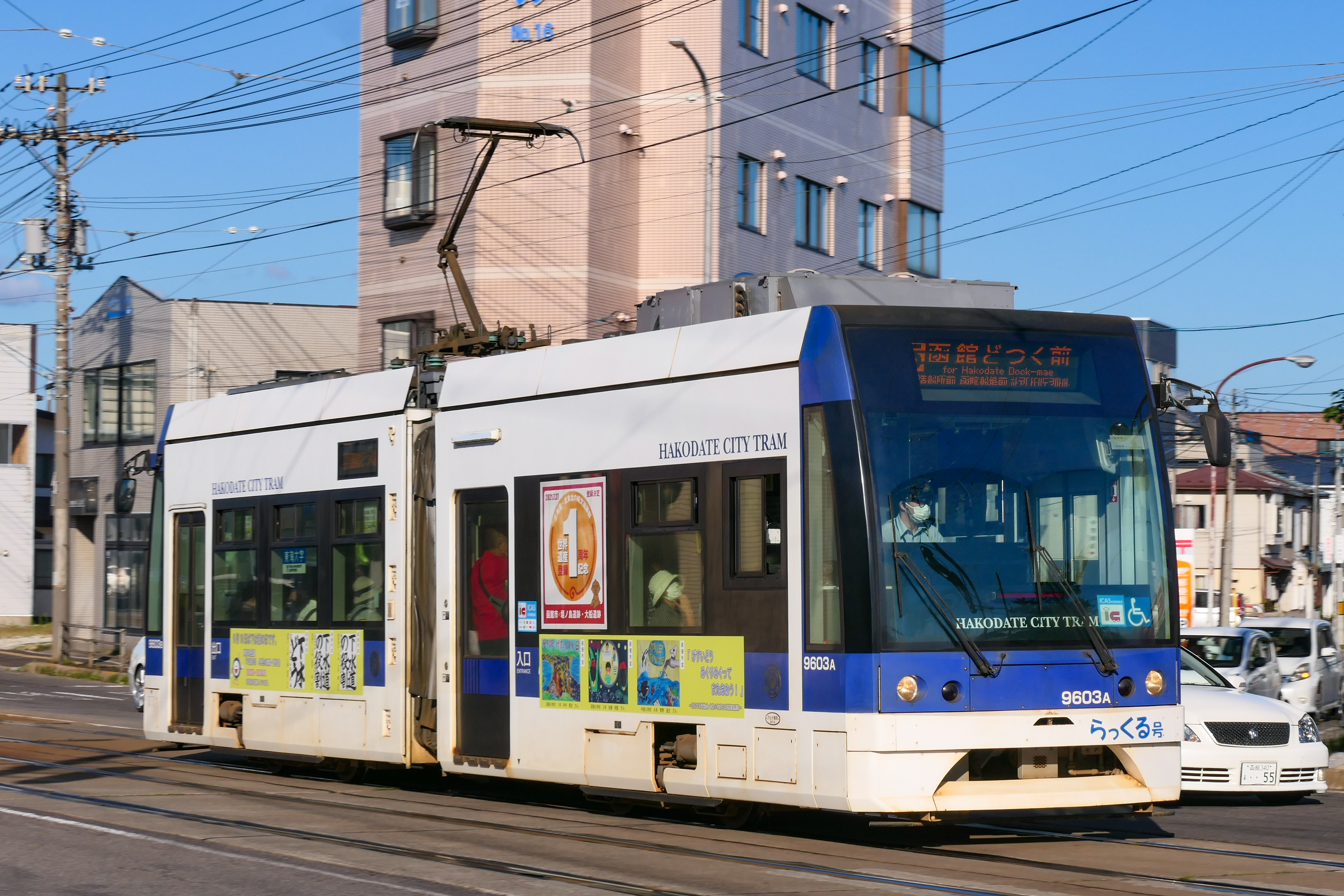
Little Dancer Type C in Hakodate

- Little Dancer

Kinki Sharyo

- Hiroden 5100 series Green Mover Max
- Hiroden 1000 series (II) Green Mover LEX
- Kinki Sharyo SLRV (low-floor centre section)

Niigata Transys

- Fukui Railway F1000 (ja:福井鉄道F1000形電車)
- Kumamoto City Tram 0800 (ja:熊本市交通局0800形電車)
- Kumamoto City Tram 9700 series (ja:熊本市交通局9700形電車)
- Man'yosen MLRV 1000 (ja:万葉線MLRV1000形電車)
- Okayama Electric Tramway 9200 (ja:岡山電気軌道9200形電車)
- Toyama City Tram Line 9000 series (ja:富山地方鉄道9000形電車)
- Toyama Light Rail TLR 0600 (ja:富山ライトレールTLR0600形電車)
- Utsunomiya Light Rail HU300 series

=== Poland ===
Konstal

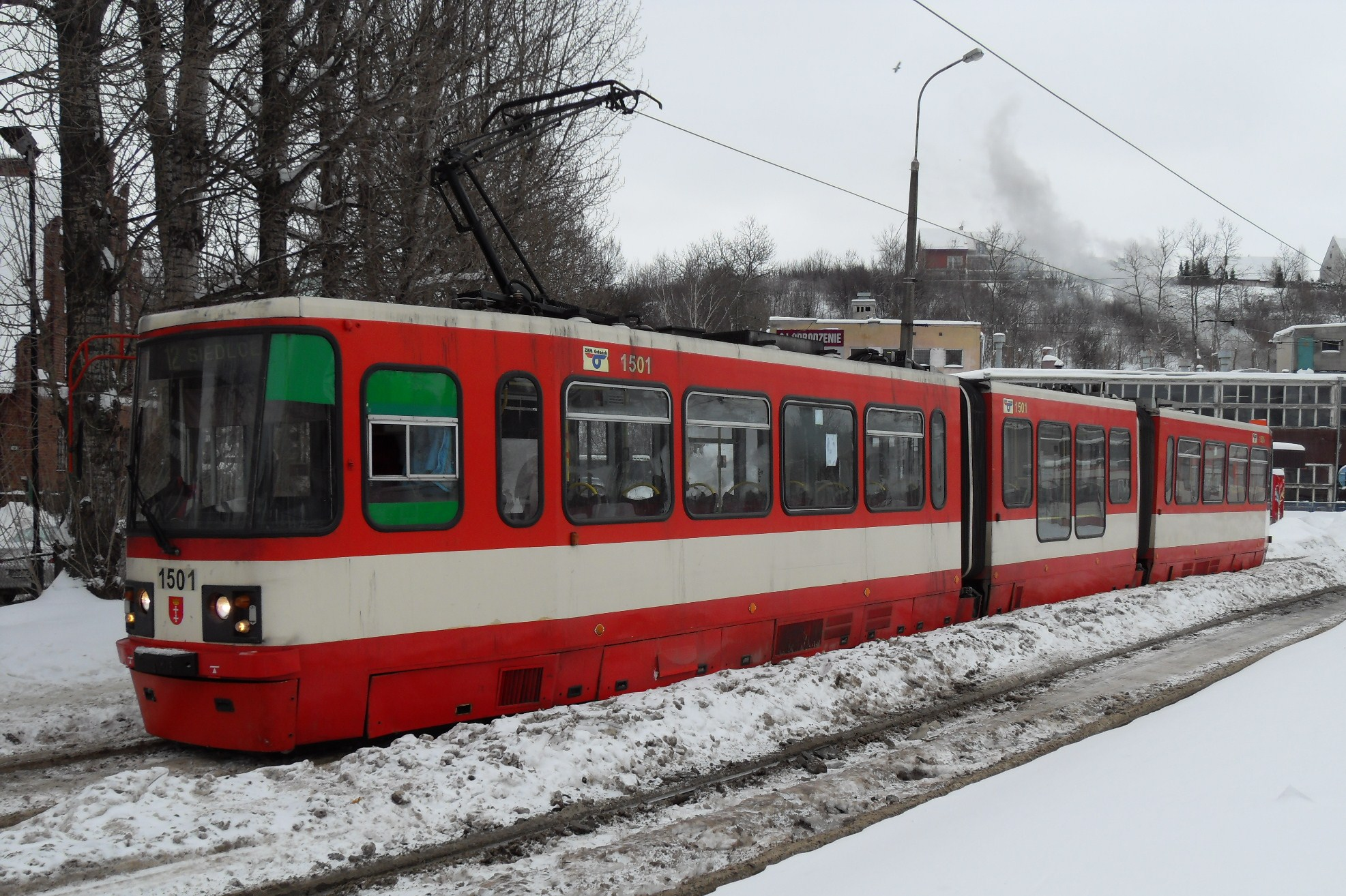
Konstal 114Na in Gdańsk

- Konstal 112N
- Konstal 114Na
- Konstal 116N/116Na
- Konstal NGd99
- Konstal 116Nd

Modertrans

- Moderus Beta MF 01, MF 13, MF 14 AC BD, MF 18 (reconstruction with low-floor middle section)
- Moderus Beta MF 02 AC, MF 15 AC, MF 16 AC BD, MF 19 AC (new trams with low-floor middle section)

Pesa

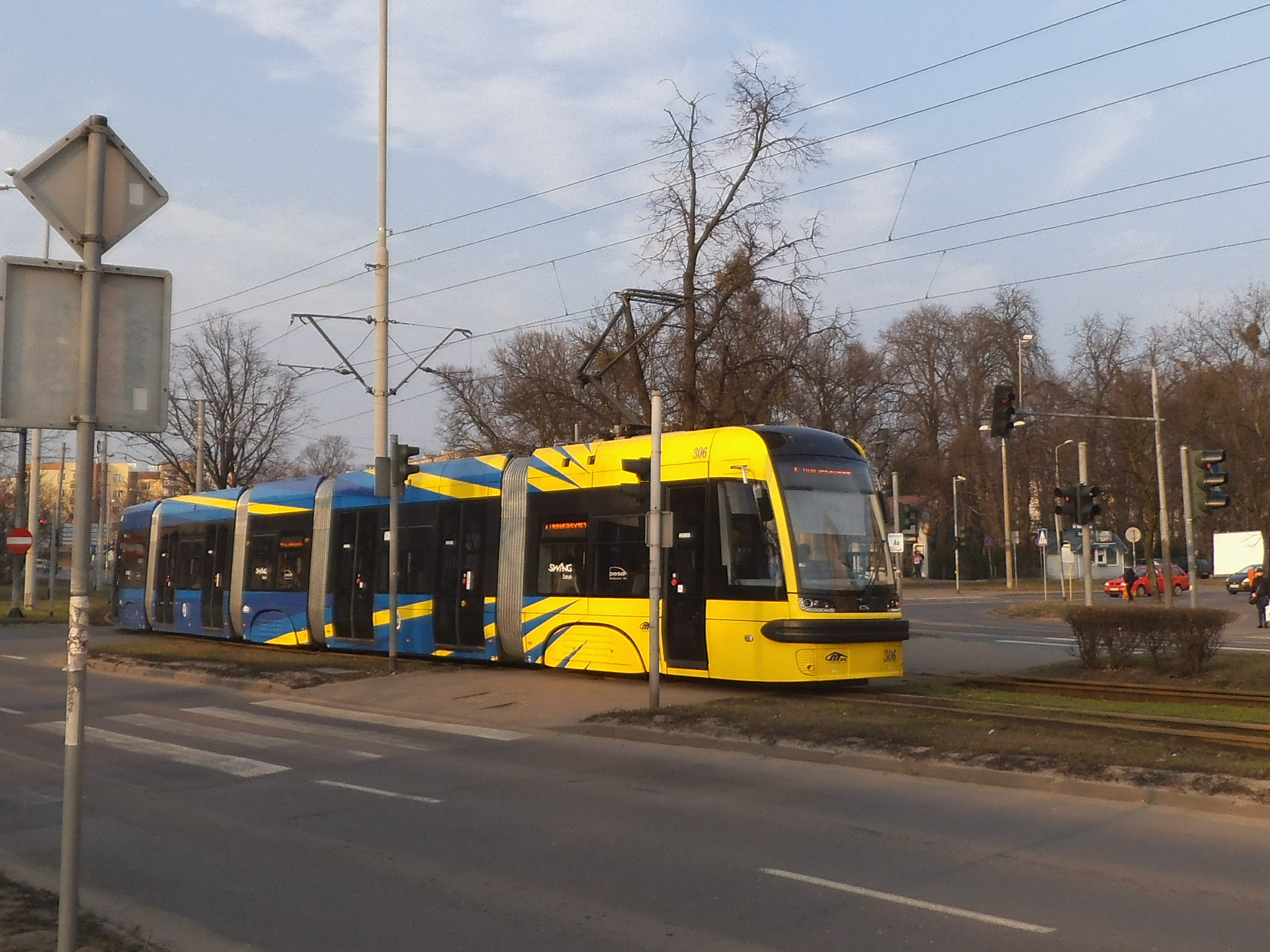
Pesa Swing 122NbT in Toruń

- Tramicus 120N, 121N and 122N
- Swing
- Jazz
- Twist 2010N, 2012N, 2014N Krakowiak and 71-414 Fokstrot

Protram

- Protram 205 WrAs
- Protram 405N, one prototype produced in 2012 and used since then in Kraków

Solaris Bus & Coach

- Solaris Tramino

=== Romania ===
Astra Vagoane Călători

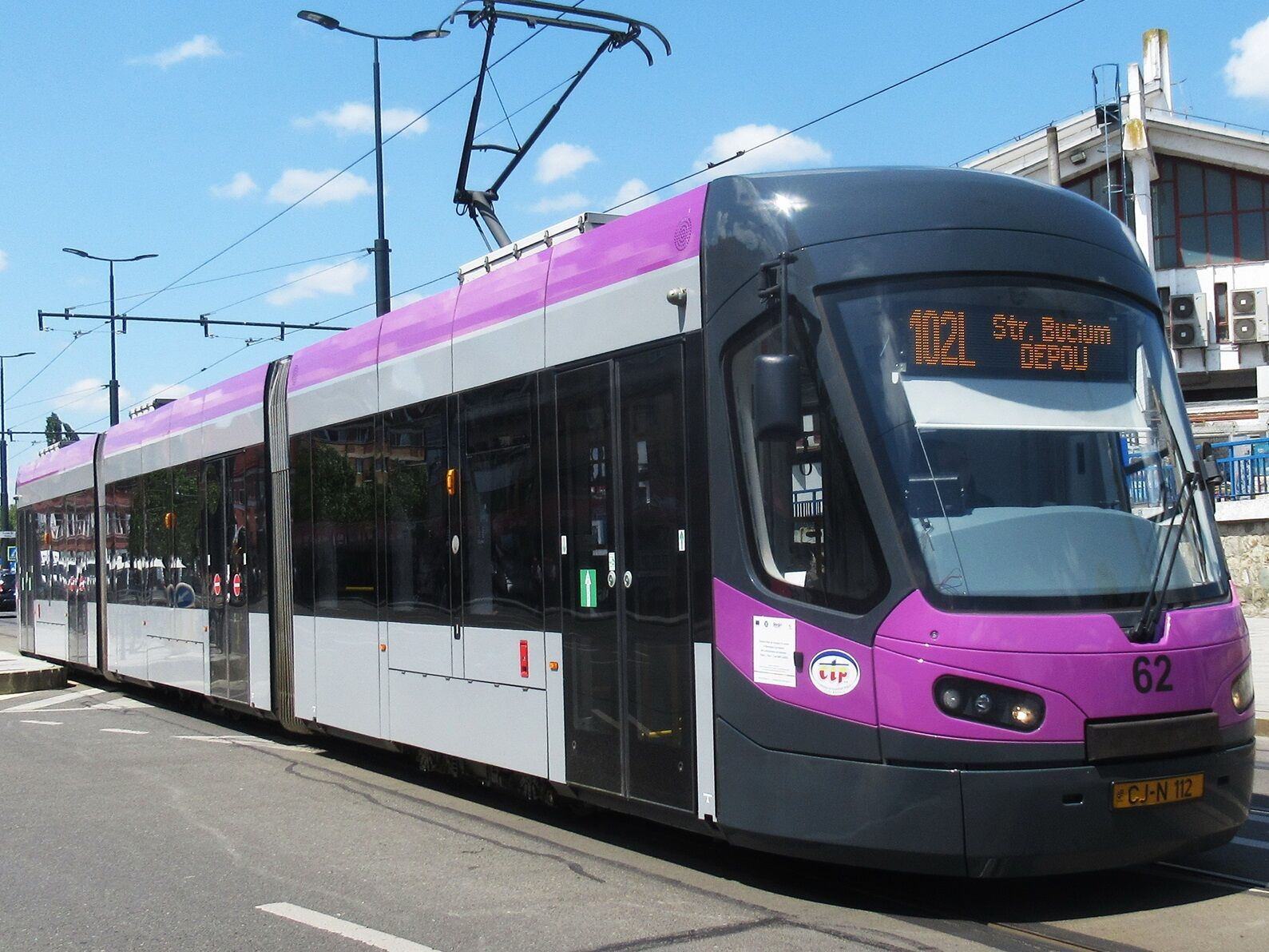
Astra Imperio tram in Cluj-Napoca

- Autentic
- Imperio

URAC Bucharest

- Bucur LF (65% low floor)
- V3A-93-CH/CA-PPC (low-floor middle section)
- V3A-93-PPC (reconstruction with low-floor middle section)

=== Russian Federation ===
PTMZ (Petěrburgskij tramvajno-mechaničeskij zavod)

- LVS-2005
- LVS-2008
- LVS-2009 (71-154) and 71-154М

UKVZ (Usť-Katavskij vagonstrojitělnyj zavod imeni Sergeje Mironoviče Kirova)

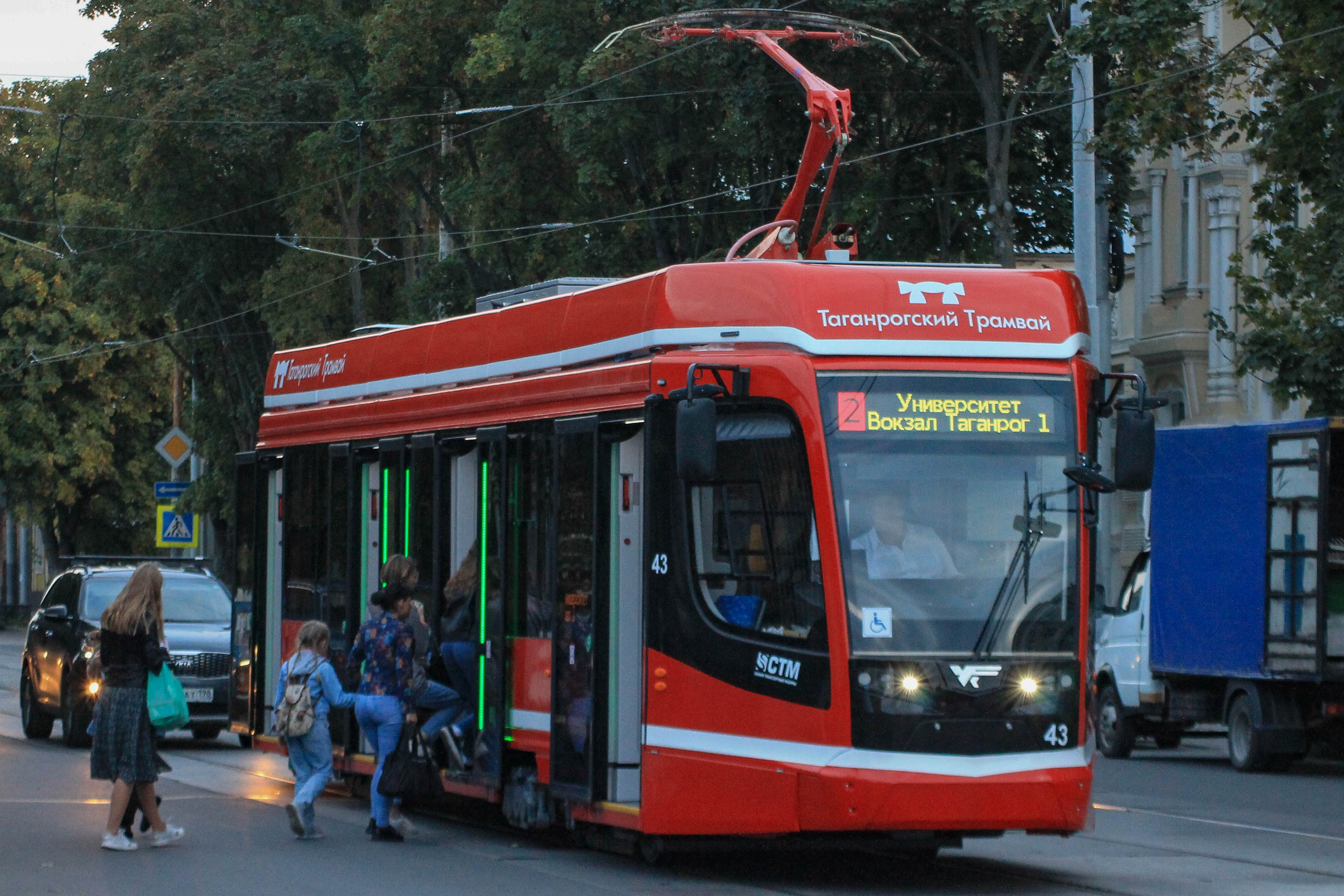
71-628 in Taganrog

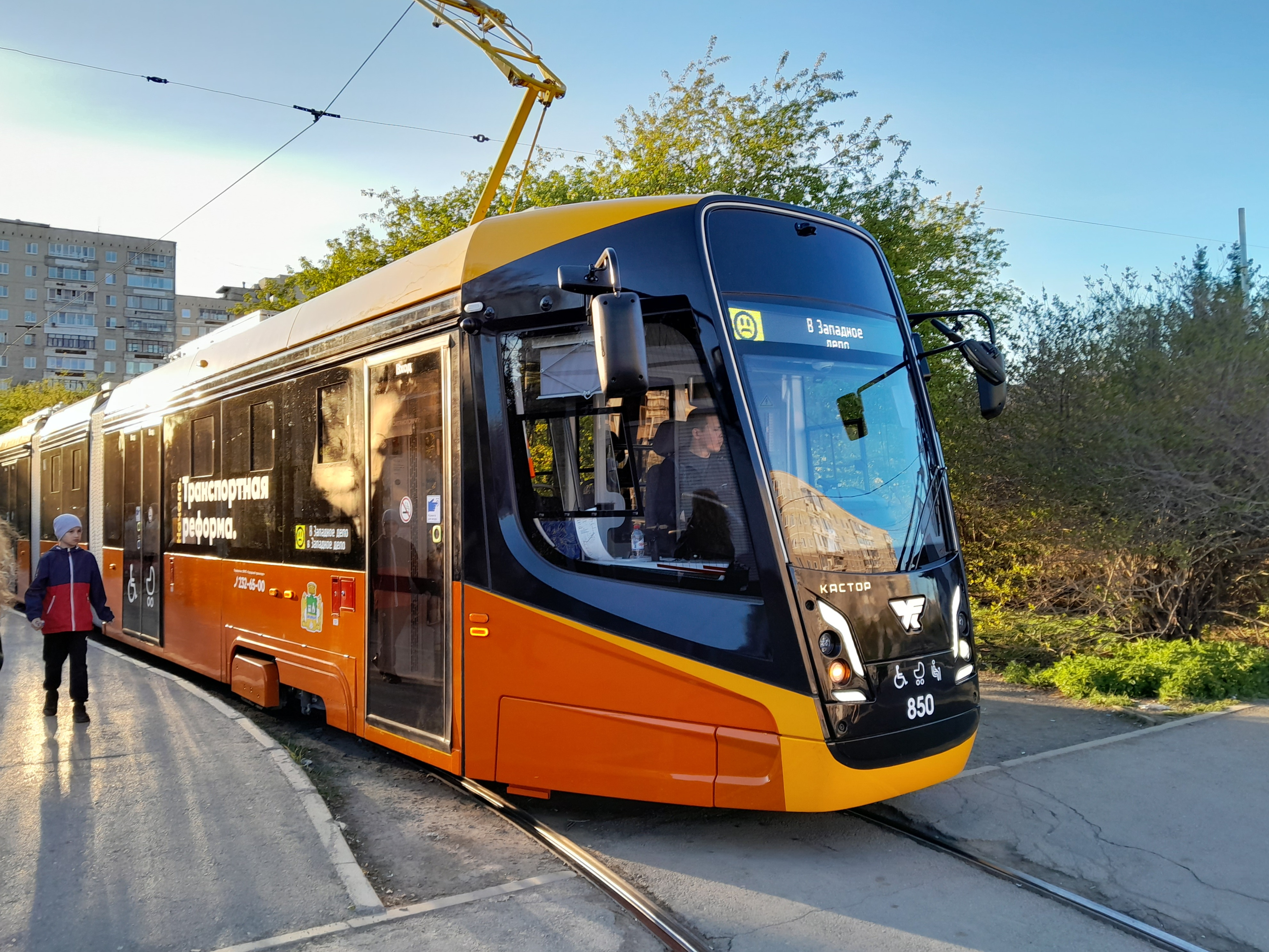
71-639 (Castor) in Yekaterinburg

- 71-623
- 71-624
- 71-628, 71-628-01, 71-628-02 and 71-628M
- 71-630
- 71-631
- 71-633
- 71-639 (Castor)

Uraltransmash

- 71-412 (partially low-floor)
- 71-415

Tver Carriage Works (PC Transport Systems contract)

- 71-911 and 71-911E (City Star)
- 71-911ЕМ (Lionet)
- 71-921 (Corsair)
- 71-922 (Varyag)
- 71-923 (Bogatyr) and 71-923M (Bogatyr M)
- 71-931 (Vityaz), 71-931M (Vityaz-M) and 71-931AM (Vityaz-Leningrad)
- 71-932 (Nevsky)
- 71-934 (Lion)

=== Spain ===
Construcciones y Auxiliar de Ferrocarriles (CAF)

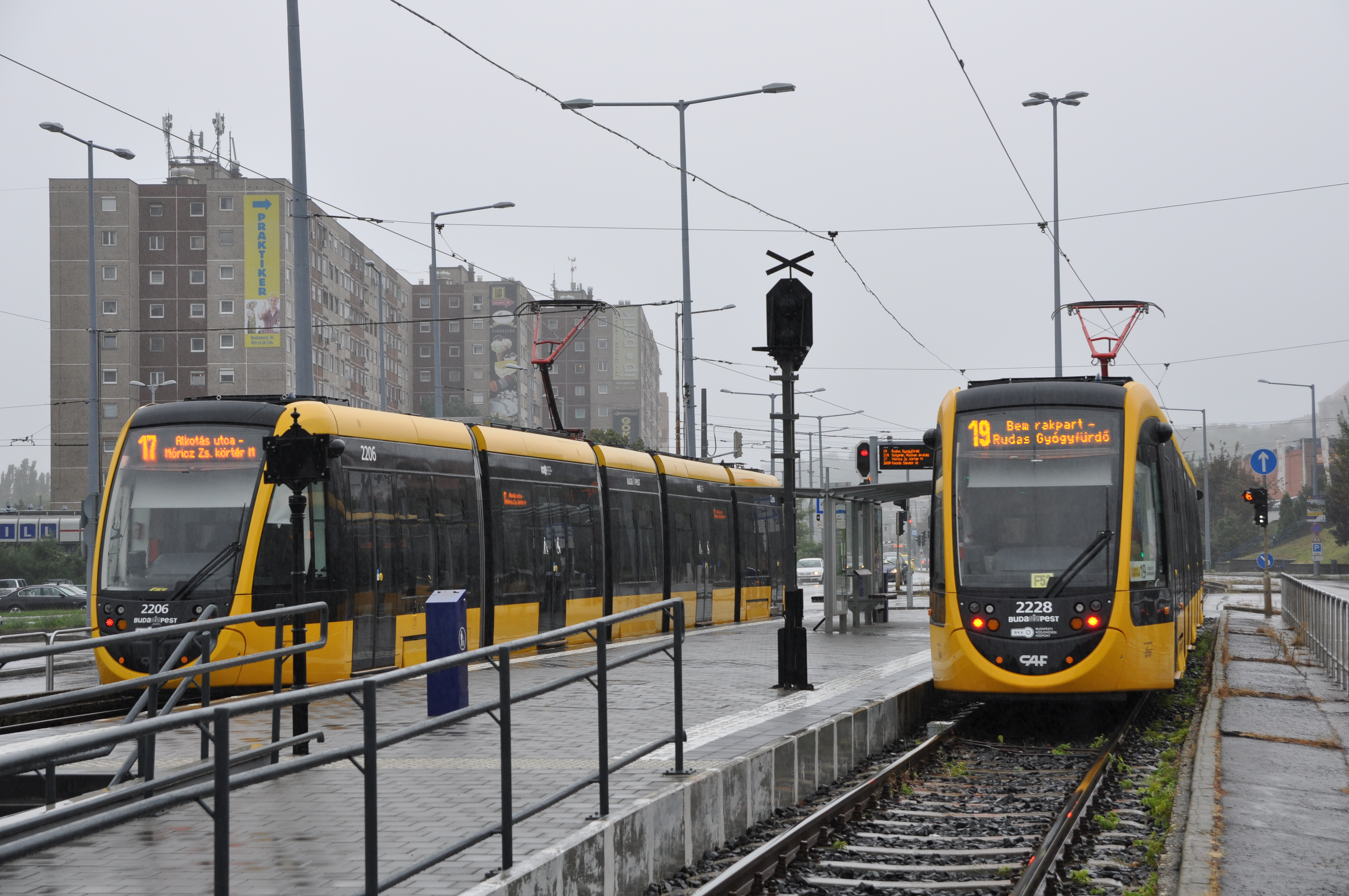
Urbos trams in Budapest

- Urbos 1
- Urbos 2
- Urbos 3
- Urbos AXL
- Urbos TT
- Urbos LRV

Vossloh España

- Citylink, including Sheffield Supertram Class 399
- Tramlink

=== Switzerland ===
ABB

- Tram 2000 Be 4/8 (low-floor middle section)
- Variobahn

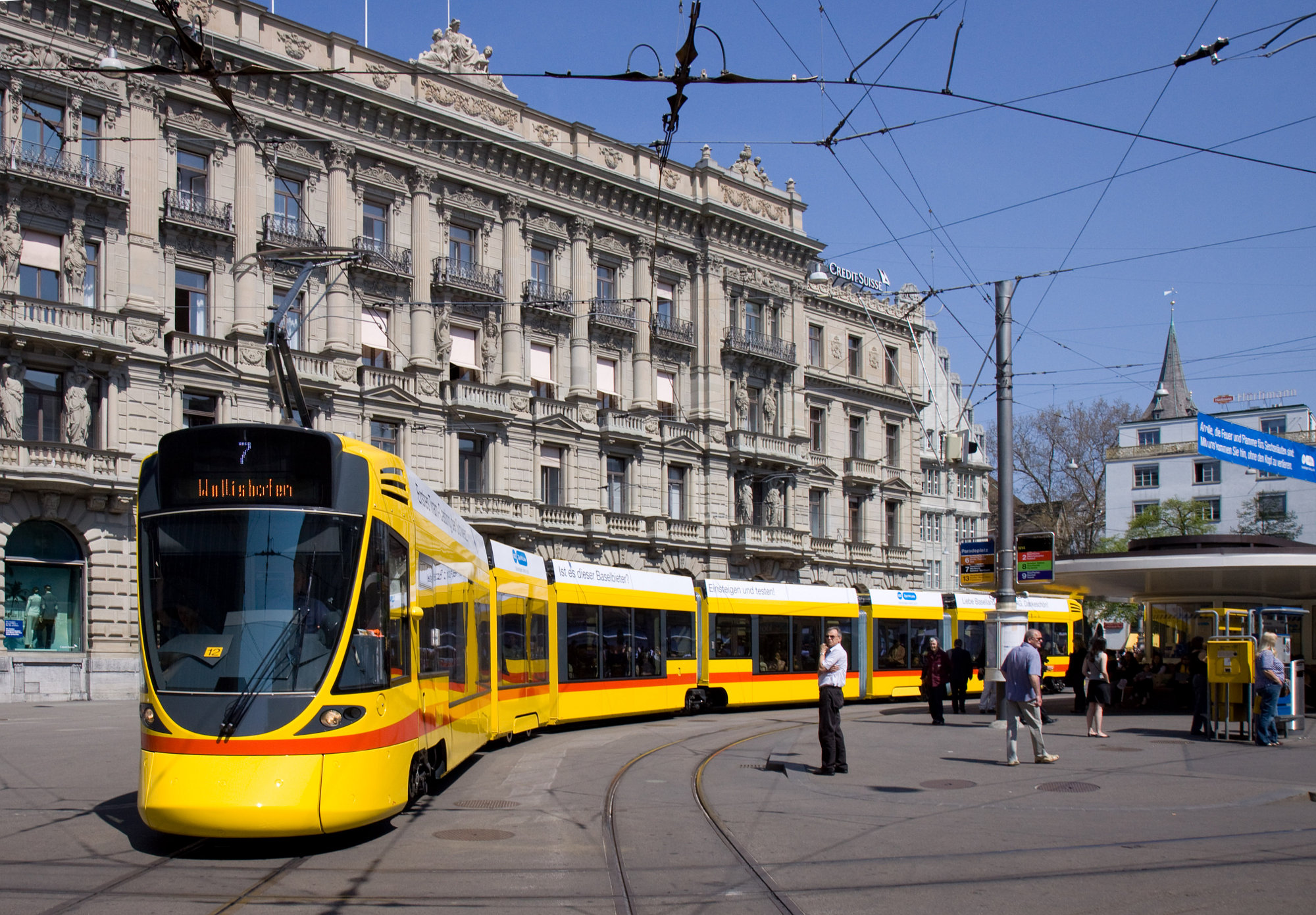
Tango tram from Basel on test in Zürich

Stadler Rail

- Citylink, including Supertram Class 399
- Tango, only some models
- TINA
- Tramlink

=== Turkey ===
Durmazlar

- Panorama
- Silkworm

Bozankaya

=== Ukraine ===
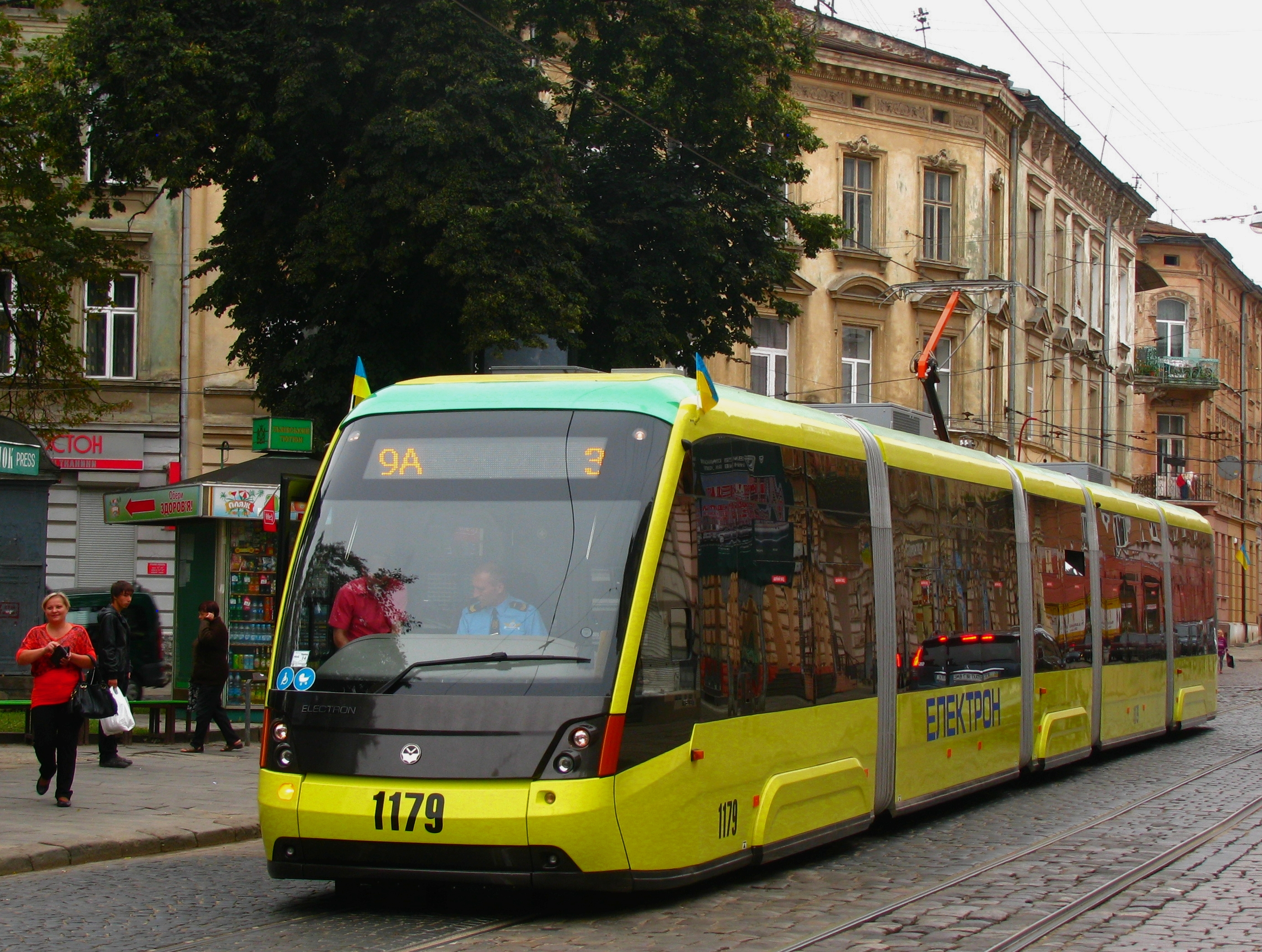
Electron T5L64 in Lviv

Electrontrans

- Electron T3L44, T5L64 and T5B65

Tatra-Yug

- K-1M6
- K-1M8
- K-1M
- K-1T

=== United States ===
Brookville Equipment

- Liberty

United Streetcar

- 10 T

=== Other trams ===
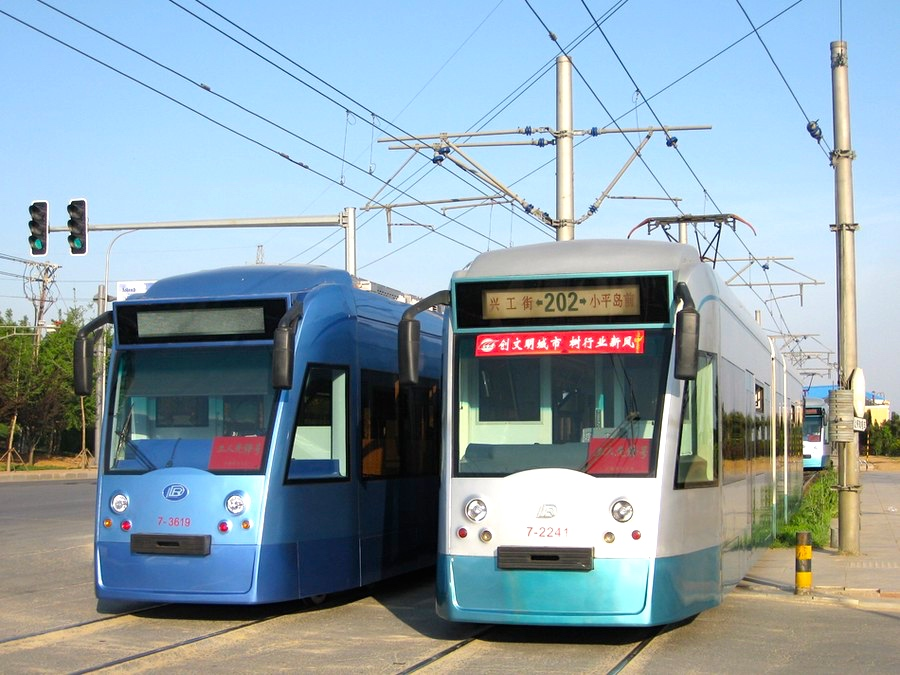
DL6WA of Dalian Tram

- BKM 85300M
- DL6WA, mark Dalianren (meaning "Dalian people") manufactured by Tram Factory of Dalian, in Dalian.
- Cegielski 118N Puma
- Tram Power City Class
- Hedley-Doyle Stepless car (1912)
- M31 in Gothenburg tram network (reconstruction with low-floor middle section)
- ja:SWIMO
- Newag Nevelo
- NGT6DD and NGT8DD in Dresden

== See also ==
- Accessibility
- Low-floor bus
- Railway platform height
