= 71-628 =

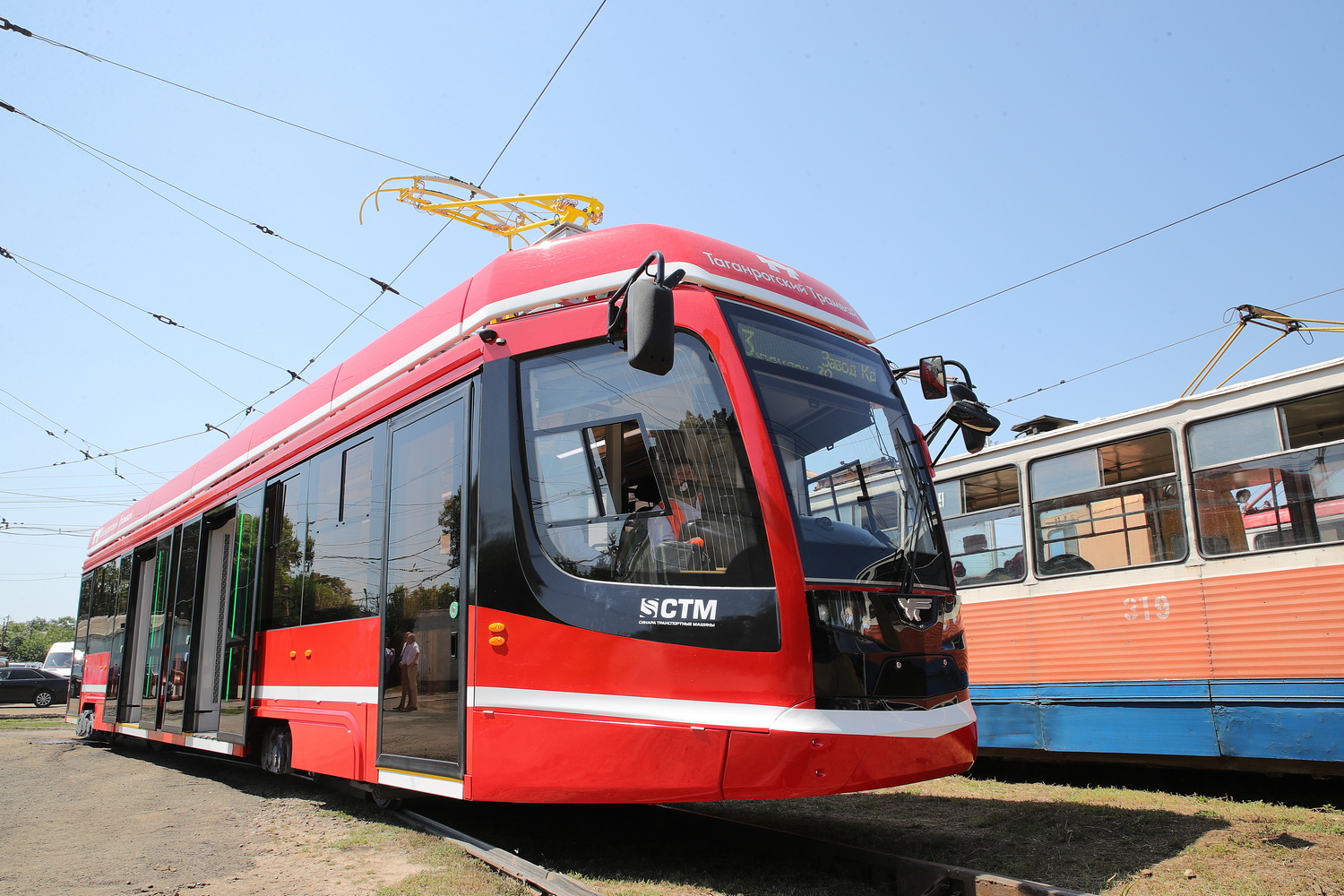
- 71-628 in Taganrog, Russia
- Manufacturer: UKVZ
- Assembly: Ust-Katav
- Family name: 71-628
- Constructed: 2021-
- Entered service: 2021-
- Number built: 374
- Capacity: Max: 166; Nominal: 116
- Operator: LLC 'Sinara-GNR Taganrog'

Specifications
- Car length: 16,500 mm (54 ft 2 in)
- Width: 2,500 mm (8 ft 2 in)
- Height: 3,700 mm (12 ft 2 in)
- Low-floor: 100%
- Entry: Low floor
- Doors: 4 (2 double leaf, 2 single leaf)
- Wheel diameter: 620 mm (24 in)
- Wheelbase: Bogie: 1,800 mm (71 in)
- Maximum speed: 75 km/h (47 mph)
- Weight: 22,000 kg (48,502 lb)
- Engine type: Asynchronous motors
- Tractive effort: 248 kW
- HVAC: Air conditioned
- Electric system: 550V
- Braking systems: Disc brakes, track brake
- Seating: 33
- Track gauge: 1,524 mm (5 ft)

The 71-628 is a Russian fully low-floor tram model built by Ust-Katav Wagon-Building Plant since 2020. The tram is based on the unrealised 71-625 project and is a development of the partially low-floor 71-623 tram.

== History and design ==
The design of the tram traces back to the 71-623, which was a 40% low floor tram, that entered service in January 2008, although the desires for a fully low floor tram date to 2002, when UKVZ had intended to launch the serial production of the 71-625. Again, in 2013, it was planned to build a fully low floor tram by the end of the year, which did not materialise. In 2014, when the bogie for the tram was ready, UKVZ broke relationships with its trading house due to a change in management, which owned the patents on the design of the bogies. The design would be applied in the 71-911, developed by PC Transport Systems on the basis of the bogie for the 71-625, which the former director of the trading house, Felix Vinokur had joined. With the loss of the bogie design, UKVZ suffered setbacks in fully low floor tram production.

From 2015 to 2019, two fully low floor, three section articulated tram 71-633 was built, however, it proved a failure, with the trial tram provided to Chelyabinsk breaking down on its first run in the city. Although problems were quickly rectified within a few days as the tram had an onboard computer that recorded failures, it had too high demands for the quality of the track and was unsuitable for the majority of Russian tram networks. The same tram model had also been tested in Saint Petersburg, where it had been rejected.

=== New low floor tram ===
Eventually, in 2021, the new 71-628 was formally presented at Chelyabinsk. The tramcar uses two swivelling bogies on a two-stage suspension, and has support for visually and hearing impaired passengers. The tramcar has air conditioning, thermal curtains for doors, mood lighting, WiFi, individually heated seats, anti-corrosion lining on the side and USB charging sockets. The tramcar interior features environmentally friendly materials.

=== Orders ===
==== Moscow ====
Despite not competing in the contract for 90 low-floor, single section trams for Moscow, UKVZ ultimately became the supplier to the contract, as while Sinara Transport Machines had contested the contract, they did not actually have any suitable vehicles; they were originally planned to be built in a joint venture with Škoda Transportation that had been agreed upon in December 2019 but no vehicles have yet to be built under this joint venture. Without an adequate vehicle, Sinara tried to engage with Uraltransmash (which had its own low-floor tram model 71-415), but were unable to reach an agreement. The contract had only fixed the total number of vehicles, but not the actual type, so Sinara was able to negotiate with UKVZ to build the trams. 50 trams are to be delivered by the end of 2021, and all 90 by April 2022. With these deliveries, it is planned to retire all trams built under the Soviet Union. The trams are the 71-628M variant, which will feature a different exterior, have wheel lubricators and autonomous running for at least 1 km, although the delivery date has then been changed to 'by the end of next year'.

The contract between Moscow Metro and Sinara was cancelled on 23 November 2021, due to the failure of Sinara to deliver the trams on time. 30 tramcars were to be delivered by the end of November, while only 1 was delivered in September, and the only car delivered was not accepted for service. As a result of this, a new tender for 90 tramcars was called.

==== Taganrog ====
60 trams are to be supplied to Taganrog for the renewal of its tram network with 10 sent in 2021, under an agreement with Sinara Group, which also includes repairs, installation of new rails and operation of the network. The trams are to be painted in red and white. The first tram arrived on 23 July 2021.

Another 40 trams were ordered, to be delivered in 2023.

==== Chelyabinsk ====
The number of 71-628 trams to be purchased has to be finalised due to the need to eliminate defects, but the test vehicle, in a long-standing tradition of operating the first vehicle of each type produced by UKVZ, will be sold to the city after issues are resolved and the car is painted in the city's livery, although other sources say that it may only return if an order is placed for the same model.

30 tramcars were ordered in 2022, after a meeting between Rogozin and Texeler, the mayor of Chelyabinsk.

== Production and service ==
City	Model	Number on balance sheet	Total orders	Years of service	Notes
Taganrog	71-628	10	60 (up to 2022) and 40 (2023)	2021-	Operated under a concession by LLC 'Sinara-GNR Taganrog'
Moscow	71-628M	0	90 (cancelled)		Different design, contract cancelled
Chelyabinsk	71-628M		30		To be delivered in 2022
