= 71-412 =

71-412/71-411
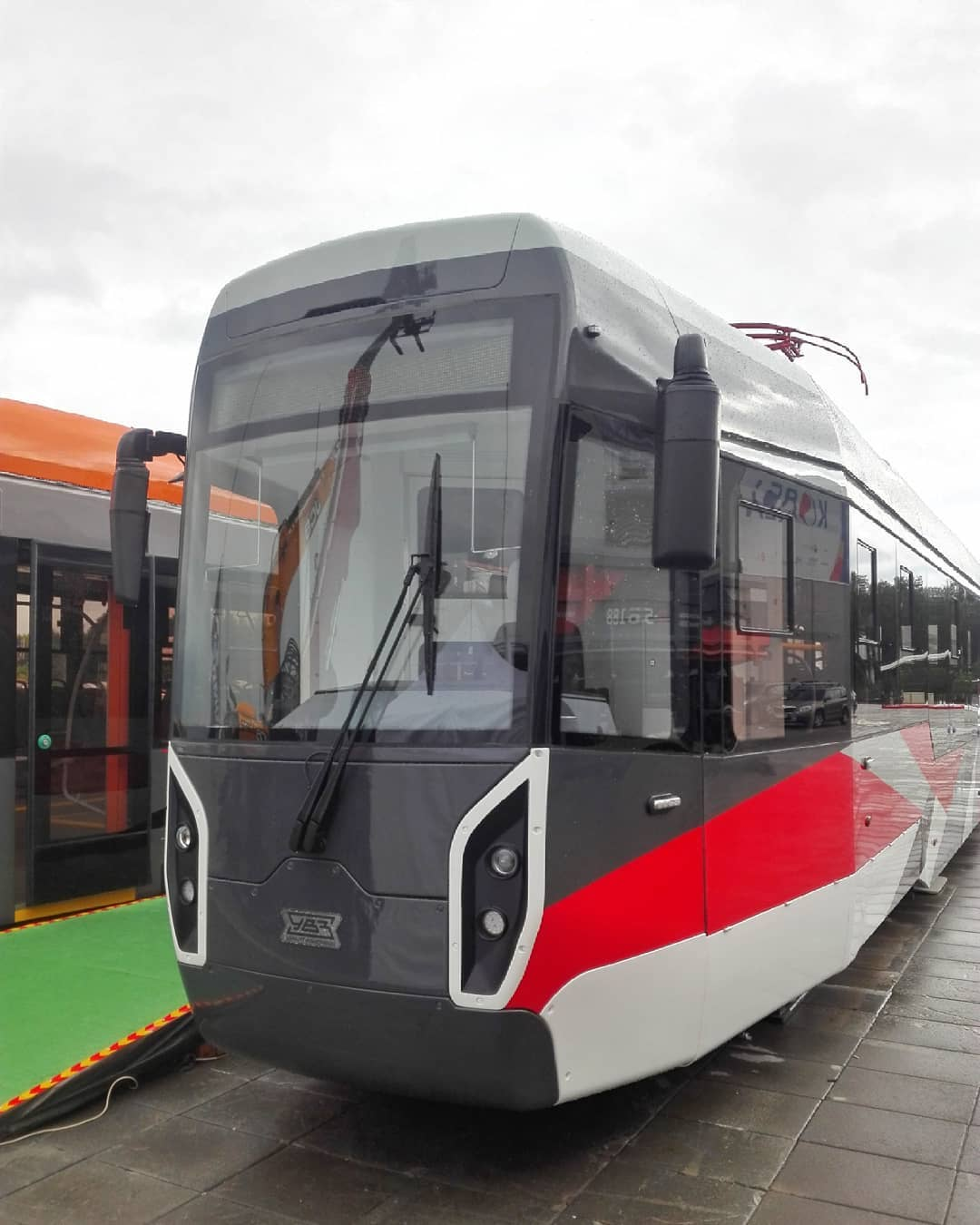
- Tram car model 71-412 at the INNOPROM-2018 exhibition in Yekaterinburg
- Manufacturer: Uralvagonzavod
- Constructed: 2018-
- Number built: 71-412: 4; 71-411: 7; 71-412-03: 1
- Capacity: 28+1 seats, 178 standing (at 8 p/m2)

Specifications
- Train length: 15,800 mm (51 ft 10 in)
- Width: 2,490 mm (8 ft 2 in)
- Height: 3,060 mm (10 ft 0 in)
- Doors: 3
- Power supply: 550 V
- Current collection: Pantograph
- Bogies: 3
- Track gauge: 71-412: 1,524 mm (5 ft); 71-411:1,000 mm (3 ft 3 3/8 in)

71-412 (also 71-411 - for 1000 mm gauge) is a Russian four-axle tram car with a variable floor level in the middle part of the cabin.

Model based on Tatra T3SU chassis equipped with a modified car body.

In 2020 4 copies were delivered for operation to Omsk. They are currently in operation.

== 71-411 ==
71-411 tram of model is a partially low-floor single-section car in 71-412 car form factor designed for a narrow gauge of 1000 mm. It has a narrower body (2.2 m instead of 2.5 m in 71-412).

On January 13, 2021, the administration of the Yevpatoria City District (City Council) signed a contract with "JSC Ural Plant of Transport Engineering" for 27 new cars supply to Yevpatoria at the end of 2021.

There are two variants:

- 71-411 — basic model, one-sided single-cabin, with three doors on the right side;
- 71-411-03 — double-sided double-cab model with front and middle doors on each side, similar to Tatra K5AR trams.

== Operation ==
State	City	Rail system	Type	Years of production	Quantity	Depot numbering	Comment	Notes
Crimea	Yevpatoria	Trams in Yevpatoria	71-411; 71-411-03	2021	4 (+4 awaiting commissioning, 12 ordered); 0 (+1 awaiting commissioning, 6 ordered)	42х-43x		
Russia	Omsk	Trams in Omsk	71-412	2018	4	150-153		

== Gallery ==
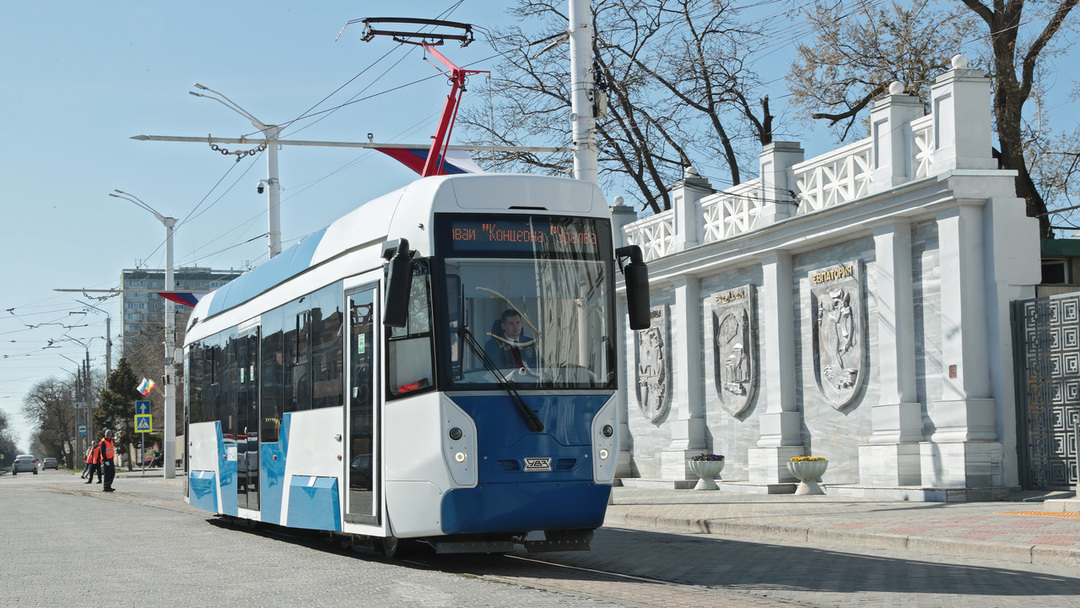
Presentation 71-411 in Yevpatoria, 2021

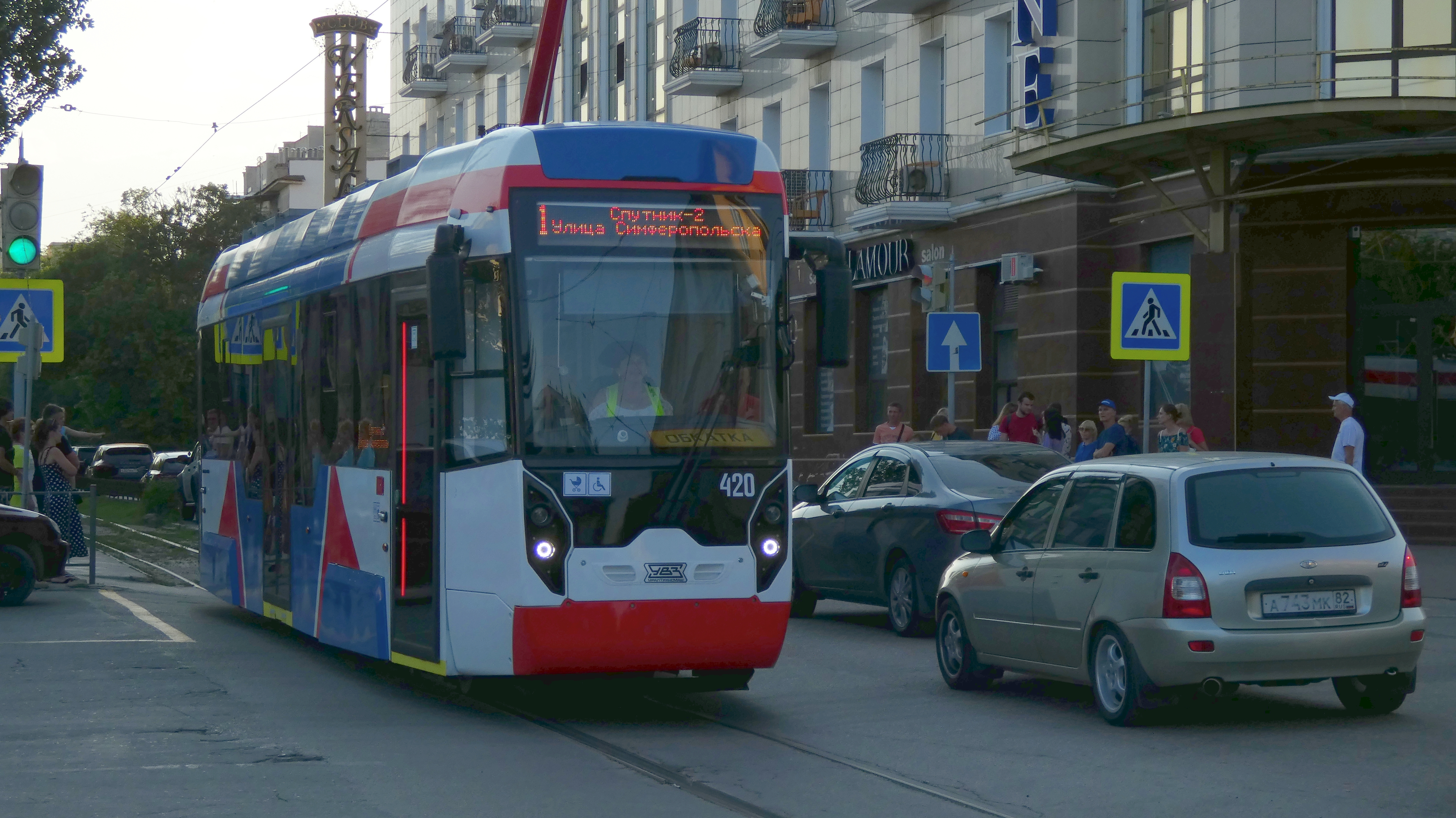
71-411 on 1 route in Yevpatoria.

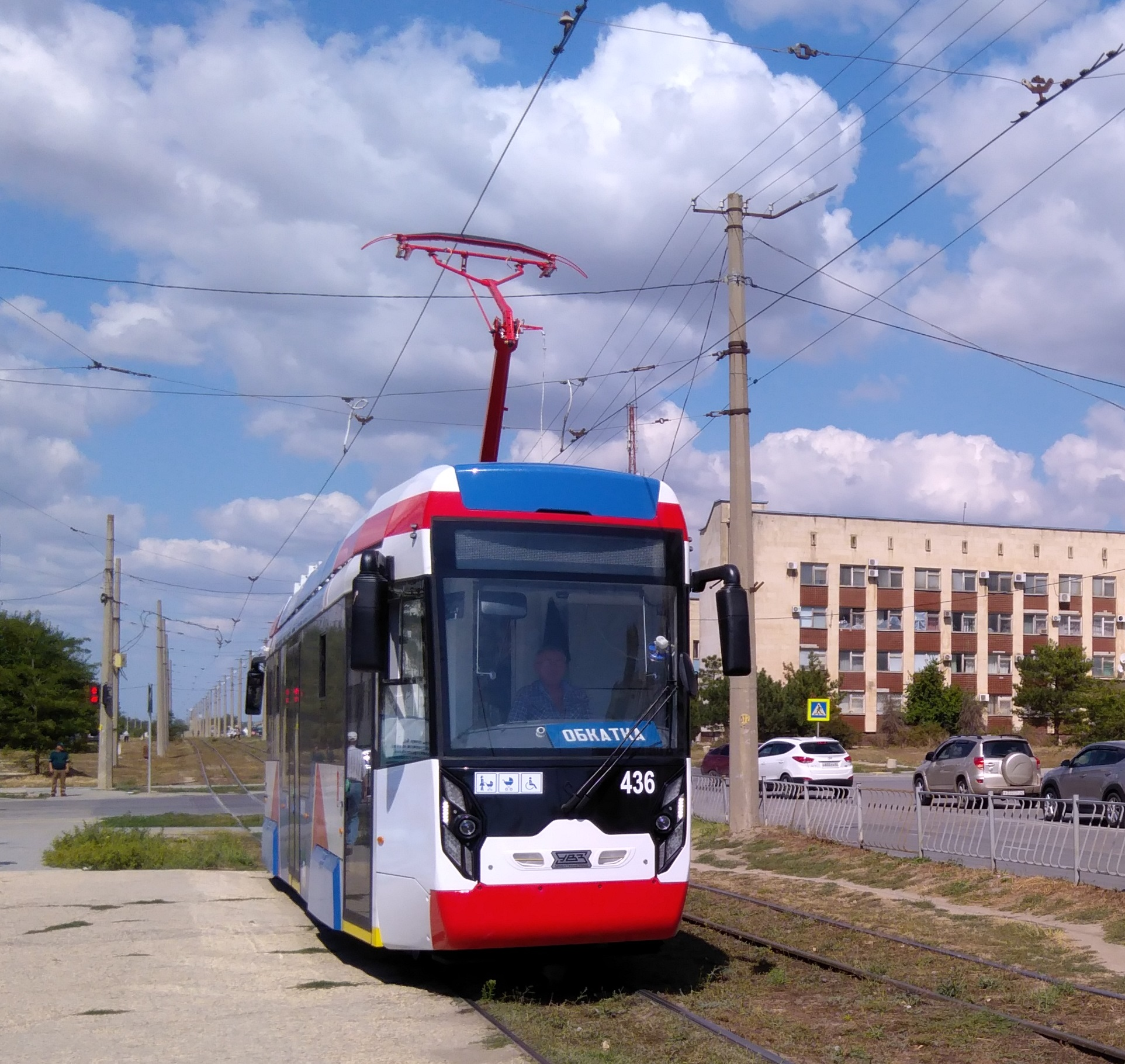
71-411-03 (two-cabin) in Yevpatoria.
