= Trams in Yevpatoria =

Tram system in Yevpatoria

Yevpatoria tram system
- Євпаторійський трамвай
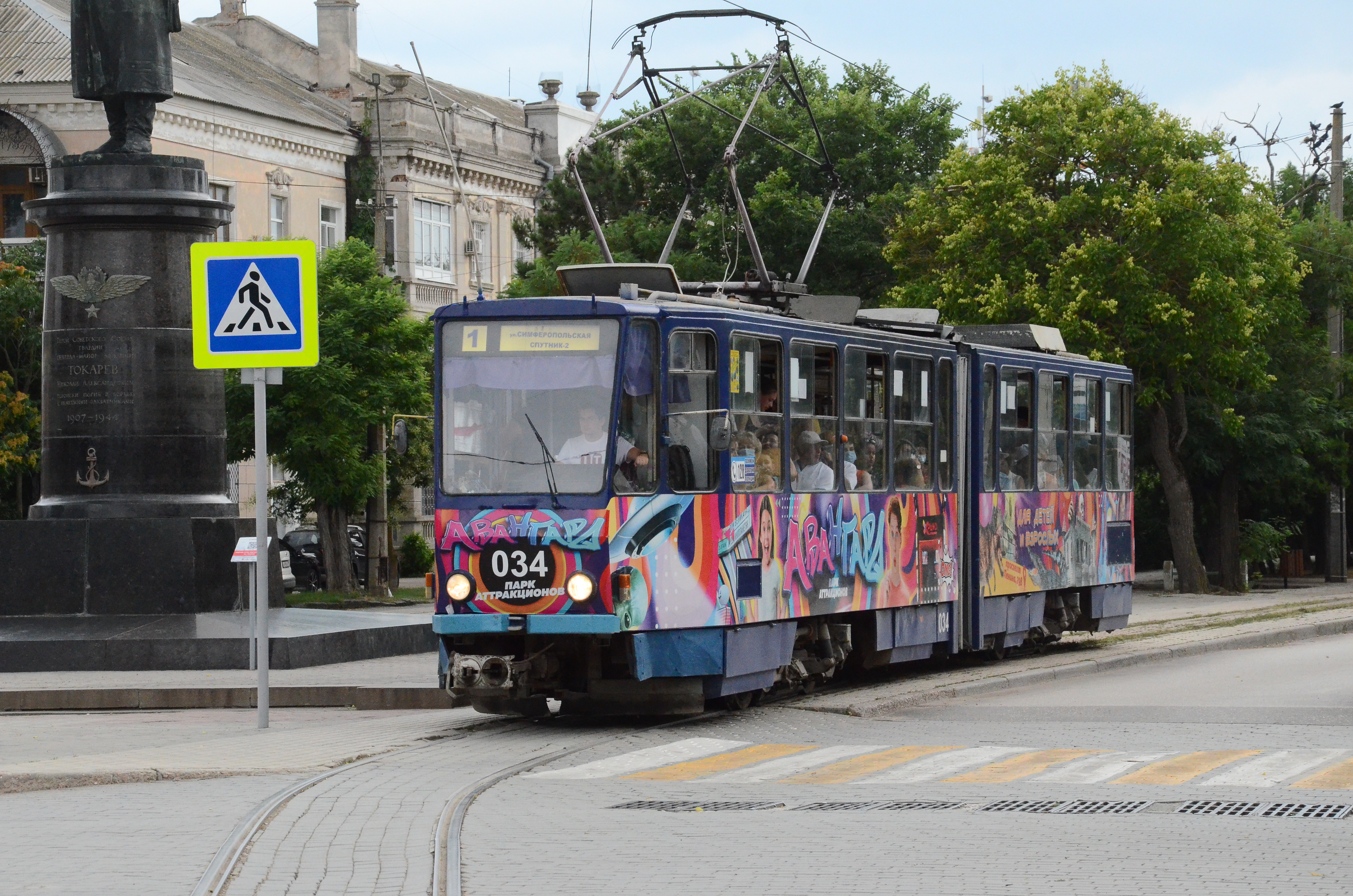
- A tram in 2021

Operation
- Locale: Yevpatoria
- Open: 23 May, 1914
- Status: Operational
- Lines: 4

Infrastructure
- Track gauge: 1,000 mm (3 ft 3 3/8 in)
- Depot: 1
- Stock: 28

Statistics
- Track length (total): 32.75 km (20 mi)
- Route length: 20 km (12 mi)
Overview
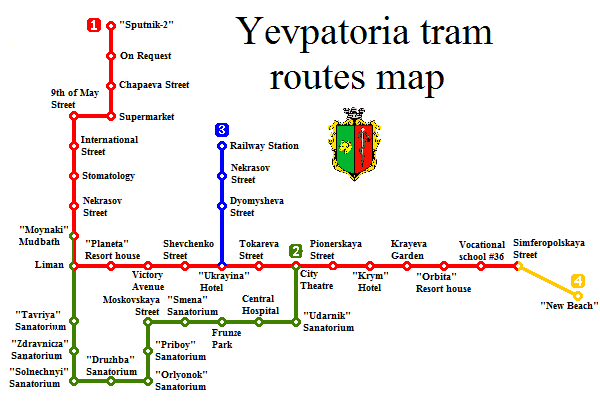

The Yevpatoria tram system (Ukrainian: Євпаторійський трамвай, romanized: Yevpatoriyskyy tramvay) is a tram system operating in Yevpatoria, in the disputed territory of Crimea.

== Routes ==
Map	Route
	Suputnyk-2 ↔ Simferopolska Street, Peremogy Avenue — 9th of May street — 60th anniversary of VLKSM — Polupanova street — Lenin Avenue — Revolutions street The route is single-track with junctions. In a small section, two-track.
	Lyman ↔ City Theater Polupanova street — Mayakovsky street - Moskovska street- Kirova street - Gogolya street The summer route passes through the resort area; a single track with junctions.
	Railway station ↔ Hotel Ukraine Frunze street The route is single-track, and the interchange at Demysheva Street was eliminated in 2015.
	Simferopolska street ↔ New beach Simferopolska street The summer route connects remote beaches with the city; single-track without junctions

== Inventory ==
As of 1st of January, 2010
Year	Type	Number
1958	T-57	3
1960	B-57	1
1960	T-57	4
1961	B-57	3
1961	T-57	1
1987	Tatra KT4SU	1
1988	Tatra KT4SU	8
1990	Tatra KT4SU	7
Total		28

== Fares ==
A 1-month pass for an adult costs 1020 rubles, or 510 for a child.
