= 71-415 =

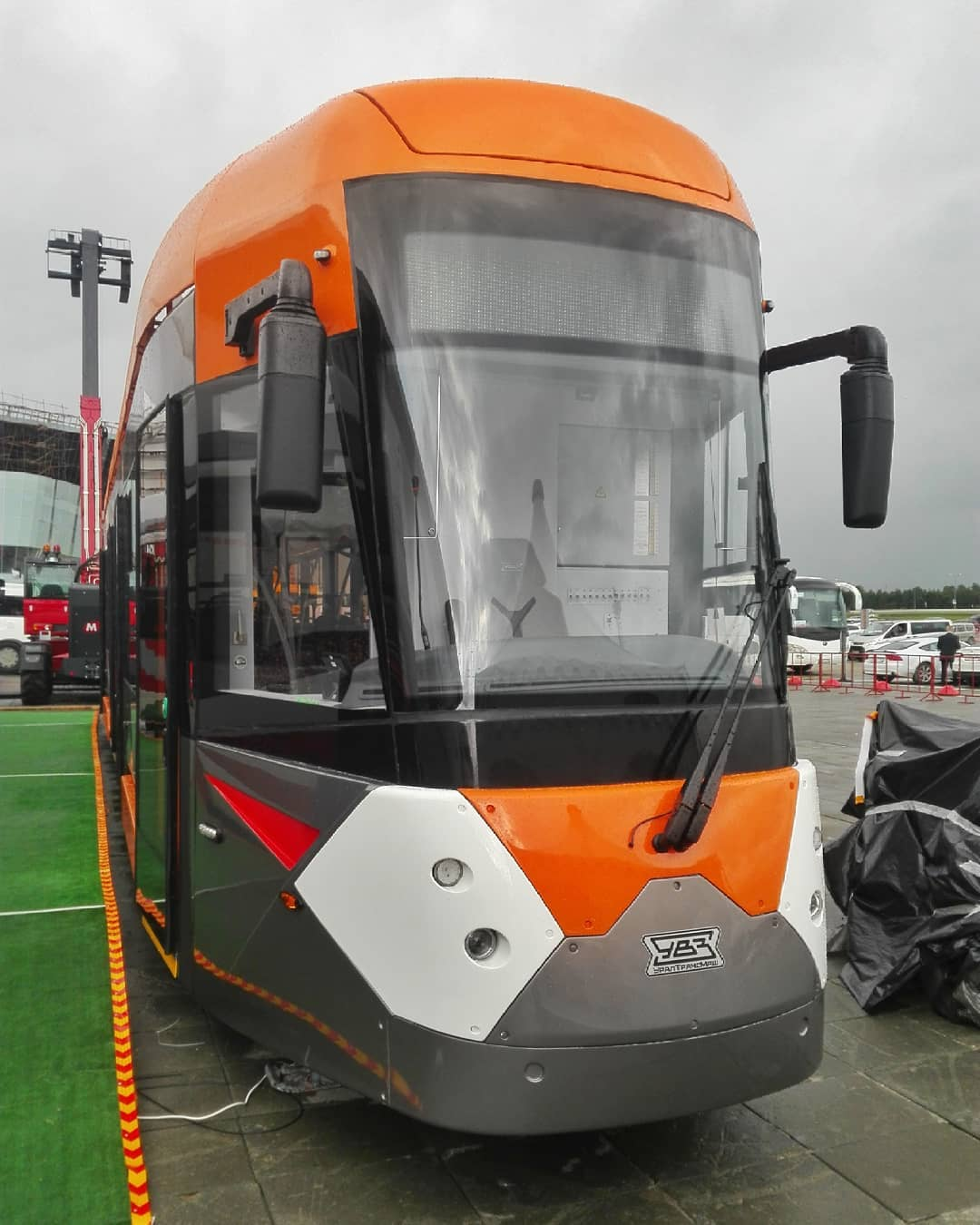
- 71-415 at InnoProm 2018
- Manufacturer: Uraltransmash Russia
- Constructed: 2018
- Number built: 5
- Number in service: 3

Specifications
- Doors: 4
- Maximum speed: 75
- Power supply: 550 V
- Current collector(s): Pantograph
- AAR wheel arrangement: Bo-Bo
- Bogies: 2
- Track gauge: 1,524 mm (5 ft)

71-415 is the first four-axle Uraltransmash tram on slewing trolleys with full low-level floor. A new chassis trolley with a two-stage spring suspension has been developed for this model. More than 70% of materials and components used in the tram are domestically manufactured. That tram presented at the INNOPROM-2018 exhibition.

The tram car received a certificate of conformity (issued by the Ministry of Transport of the Russian Federation) in December 2018 and accepted for serial production.

Currently, the 3 cars are in service in Nizhny Tagil while two other demonstrators have been transferred back to the factory.

== Design ==
The vehicle uses a new bogie design with a two-stage spring suspension. This allows for the creation of a wide aisle, easing the movement of passengers within the cabin. The exterior has been designed in a modular way, making replacement of body parts in depots easier due to it being a removable element.

== Related developments ==
=== 71-415R ===
The 71-415R is a variant of the tram car designed with a retro exterior and interior. The dimensions are the same but they feature more seats for less standing space. So far, one vehicle has been produced and is in service in Chelyabinsk.

=== 71-418 ===
The 71-418 is a fully low floor, 3 section articulated tram. The largest similarity to the 71-415 is that the bogies on these vehicles are the same.
