= Inekon 12 Trio =

Czech tram model

Inekon 12 Trio / 121 Trio
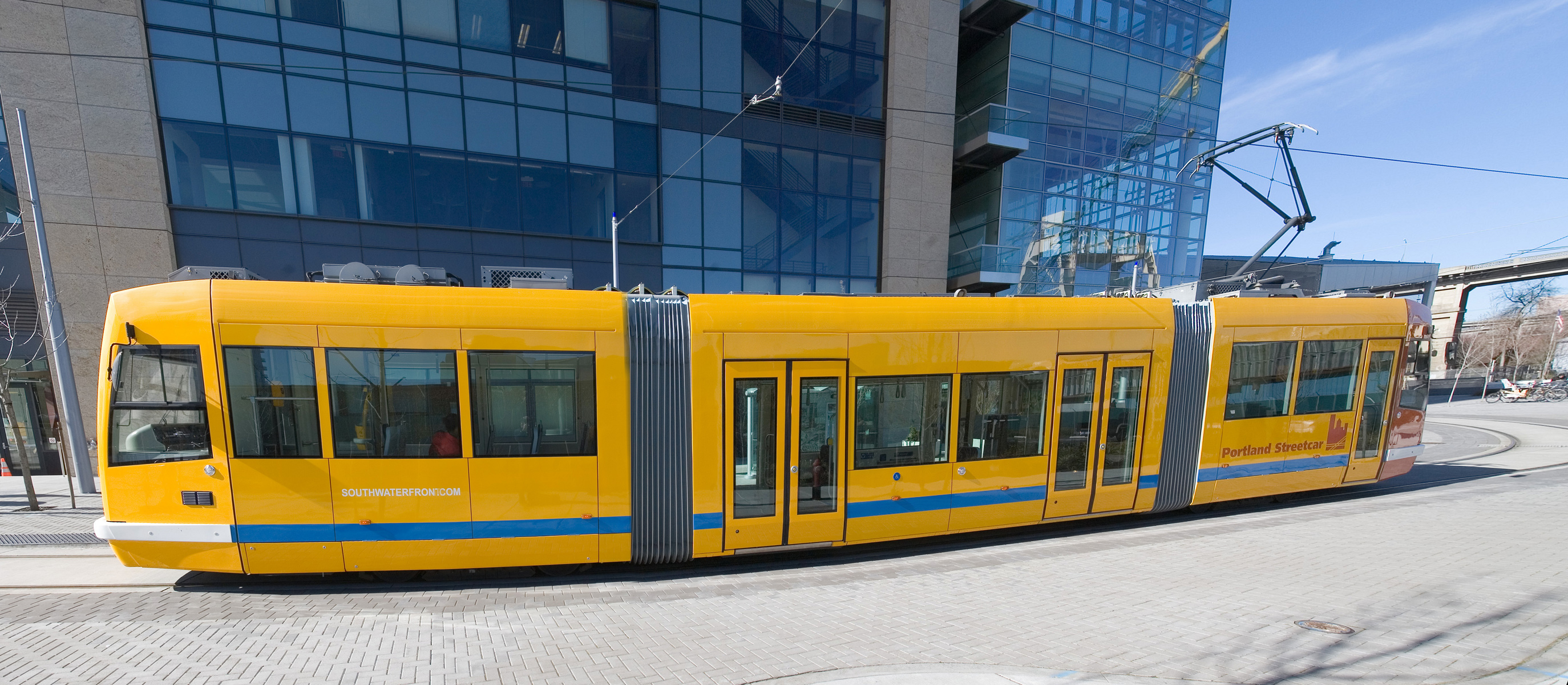
- Assembly: Most cars: In Ostrava, Czech Republic; Four 121-Trio cars for Seattle: In Seattle, U.S.
- Constructed: 2006–2015
- Number built: 16
- Predecessor: Škoda 03 T
- Capacity: 27 (Seated); 113 (Standing)

Specifications
- Weight: 29 metric tons (32.0 short tons; 28.5 long tons)

The Inekon 12 Trio is an articulated low-floor tram manufactured by Inekon Trams in the Ostrava factory. Production is performed in cooperation with the city transport company of Ostrava. The 12 Trio is a double-ended (bi-directional) version of the Inekon 01 Trio tram. The 01 Trio is conceptually based on the Škoda 03 T developed by Škoda Transportation and Inekon Group. While the 01 Trio Tram is operated on the local market in the Czech Republic, the 12 Trio model was designed for export. The standard model is designated as 12 Trio, but in 2012–13 Inekon introduced a variant that is capable of limited operation on batteries only, and this is designated 121 Trio. As of 2016, the 121 model has only been purchased by Seattle.

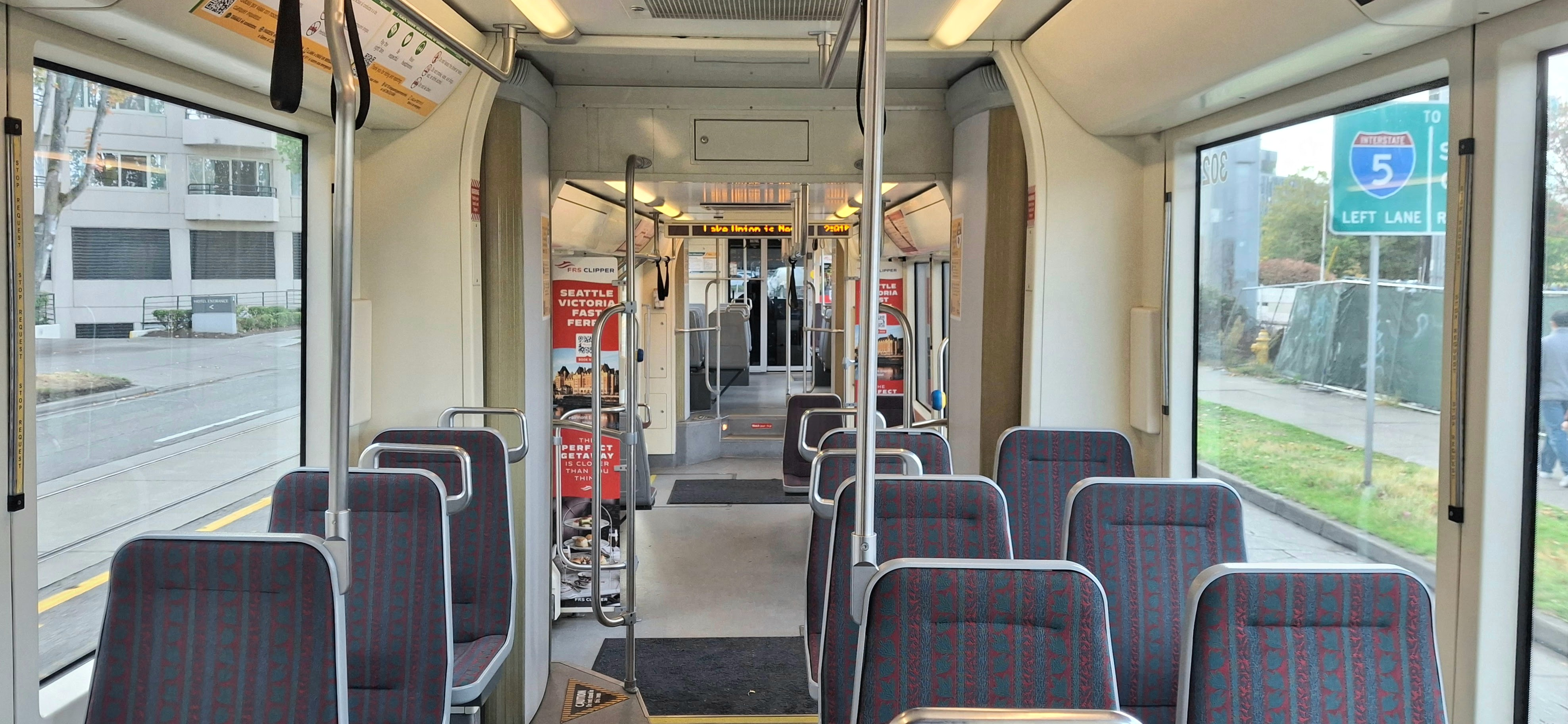
The interior of a 12 Trio used by the Seattle Streetcar system in the United States

== Deliveries and operation ==
Trams of this type have been purchased by three U.S. cities, as follows:

- Portland Streetcar: 3 cars (nos. 008–010), built in 2006 and delivered in 2007
- Seattle Streetcar: 10 cars by 2016. First order was for 3 cars, delivered in 2007. Another six cars were ordered in late 2011 for use on a planned second line, and these are model 121-Trio, capable of "off-wire" operation part of the time. A seventh car was added to the order in late 2012. Delivery began in 2015.
- The Department of Transportation of Washington, D.C. for the D.C. Streetcar line: 3 cars, completed in 2007 but not shipped to the USA until late 2009, due to delays in construction of the tram line and carhouse (storage and maintenance building) in Washington.

All nine of the standard 12-Trio cars manufactured to date (in 2006–07) were equipped with propulsion control systems made by Elin EBG.
