= DC Streetcar =

Former streetcar line in Washington, D.C.

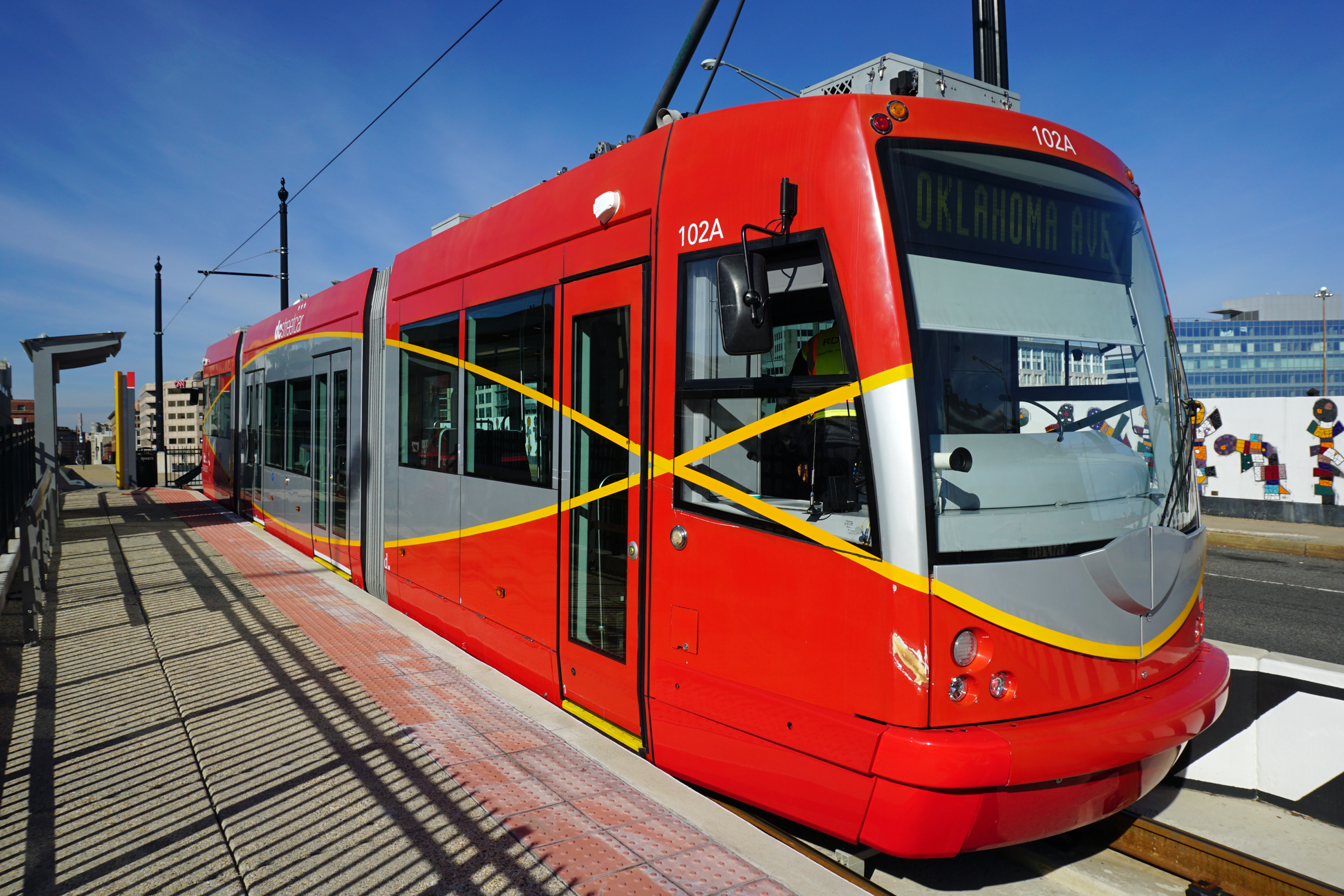
- DC Streetcar at Union Station stop at the end of the H Street NE line

Overview
- Owner: Government of the District of Columbia
- Locale: Washington, D.C.
- Transit type: Streetcar
- Number of lines: 1
- Annual ridership: (2025)

Operation
- Began operation: February 27, 2016; 10 years ago
- Ended operation: March 31, 2026; 7 months ago
- Operator: RATP Dev
- Character: Street running

Technical
- System length: 2.4 mi (3.9 km); 37 mi (60 km) planned
- Track gauge: 4 ft 8 1/2 in (1,435 mm) standard gauge
- Electrification: Overhead line, 750 V DC
Route diagram
H Street/Benning Road Line highlighted in red

The DC Streetcar was a streetcar system in Washington, D.C. that operated from 2016 to 2026 along a single 2.2-mile (3.5 km) line on H Street and Benning Road in the city's Northeast quadrant.

The streetcars were the first to run in the District of Columbia since 1962, when a previous streetcar system was dismantled. In 2009, the city government began laying track for two lines in Anacostia and Benning along street-running routes chosen to revitalize blighted commercial corridors. The Anacostia line never opened; operation began on the H Street/Benning Road Line on February 27, 2016. In 2025, it handled 836,438 riders. The system was owned by the District of Columbia Department of Transportation (DDOT) and managed and operated by RATP Dev USA, the US arm of RATP Dev, a French transportation company. A trolleybus line was proposed to replace it by 2027.

== Development ==
=== First iteration of streetcars ===
Between 1862 and 1962, streetcars in Washington, D.C., were a common mode of transportation, but the system was dismantled in the early 1960s as part of a switch to bus service.

=== Second iteration of streetcars ===
In the late 1990s, the Washington Metropolitan Area Transit Authority, commonly referred to as "Metro," began considering a series of rapid bus, light rail, and streetcar projects throughout the Washington, D.C., metropolitan region as a means of providing intra-city and intra-regional mass transit and to meet the transit needs of the quickly growing population of the area. The first project was proposed for Alexandria, Virginia, in 1999. In January 2002, District of Columbia officials began studying the economic feasibility and costs of constructing a 33-mile (53.1 km) system of streetcars throughout the city. The project received Metro's backing. DDOT studied the feasibility of both a citywide system and one or more "starter" lines. D.C. Council Member David Catania specifically requested that DDOT study adding streetcars in the Anacostia neighborhood.

==== First line proposal ====
DDOT issued a favorable report, and the D.C. Council approved an expenditure of $310 million for the streetcar project in September 2002. The first line to be built would be a 7.2-mile (11.6 km) "starter" streetcar line in Anacostia. The goal of the project was to bring light rail to Anacostia first (rather than last, as had happened with Metrorail), and to provide a speedier, more cost-effective way to link the neighborhood with the rest of the city.

Initially, the line was planned to run along the abandoned CSX railway tracks (known as the Shepherd Industrial Spur) from the Minnesota Avenue Metro station to the Anacostia Metro station, then cross the 11th Street Bridges before connecting with the Navy Yard–Ballpark and Waterfront Metro stations. DDOT originally planned to purchase diesel multiple unit cars (self-propelled rail cars powered by diesel engines) from Colorado Railcar. Layton Lyndsey, reporting in The Washington Post, asserted the cars would be the first of their kind to be built in the United States and approved by the Federal Railroad Administration.

==== Financial problems ====
Financing for the plan proved problematic. In November 2002, the same month that the D.C. government agreed to co-fund the streetcar project, Metro formally changed its strategic plan and proposed spending $12 billion over 10 years on rapid bus, light rail, and streetcar projects throughout the D.C. area. Metro proposed allocating half the total amount to build the D.C. streetcar line, complete the Silver Line, build a streetcar line on Columbia Pike in Arlington County in Virginia, and build a Purple Line light rail link between Bethesda and New Carrollton in Maryland. However, state and local governments said they were unable to fund Metro's proposal at that time, and the planned projects died. (Metro opened a portion of the Silver Line in 2014 and the remainder of the line opened in late 2022. The Purple line project was later funded through Maryland state and local funds and federal grants, and was scheduled to open in 2027.)

The District of Columbia subsequently decided to build the initial components of the DC Streetcar system on its own. The Anacostia line was scaled back to a demonstration project just 2.7 miles (4.3 km) in length with only four stations: Bolling Air Force Base, the Anacostia Metro station, the intersection of Martin Luther King, Jr. Avenue SE and Good Hope Road SE, and the Minnesota Avenue Metro station. DDOT began an environmental assessment of the CSX tracks in July 2003. In September 2004, Metro agreed to move ahead with the project (whose $45 million cost was now being funded completely by the District of Columbia), with construction to start in November 2004 and end in 2006.

==== Circulator oversight ====
In December 2009, D.C. Councilmember Jim Graham proposed establishing a D.C. Transit Board to oversee the DC Circulator bus system as well as the DC Streetcar system. The board would oversee the establishment of routes and transit fares. In order to determine whether the local business community would support the streetcar project, several local real estate and commercial developers visited the Portland Streetcar system which operates in Portland, Oregon. The goal of the trip was to investigate whether streetcars had the intended positive economic consequences and whether the return on investment seemed worthwhile. Local media reports indicated that the D.C. developers were impressed by the effect streetcars had on Portland's economic development.

==== 2011 announcement and more delays ====
On August 22, 2011, DDOT announced the first streetcars would roll on the H Street line in the summer of 2013.

In April 2014, DDOT estimated that the H Street Line would open in the fall of 2014. A temporary car barn at the former Spingarn High School was scheduled for completion in July. Testing of the system would take several weeks, and then the system would need to be certified for operation by the Federal Transit Administration (FTA), which would take another 60 to 80 days. DDOT also said it needed to take delivery of a sixth streetcar, likely in June, before any testing could begin. With a decision on the fare structure still months off, Council Member Marion Barry threatened to cancel all funding for all planned DC Streetcar lines. Barry argued that the rider subsidy was too high and that the $800 million planned for construction of the remaining lines could be better used for road maintenance and school construction.

==== Closure ====
DC Streetcar shortly before service ended, 8th St and H St, Washington, DC

In May 2025, DC Mayor Muriel Bowser announced a 2026 budget proposal that would end funding for the streetcars. She said the service would be replaced within two years by an electric trolleybus that will use its overhead electric wires. In October 2025, she announced more budget cuts and said the system would close in March 2026.

The system ceased operations on March 31, 2026.

== Rolling stock ==
=== Railcar fleet ===
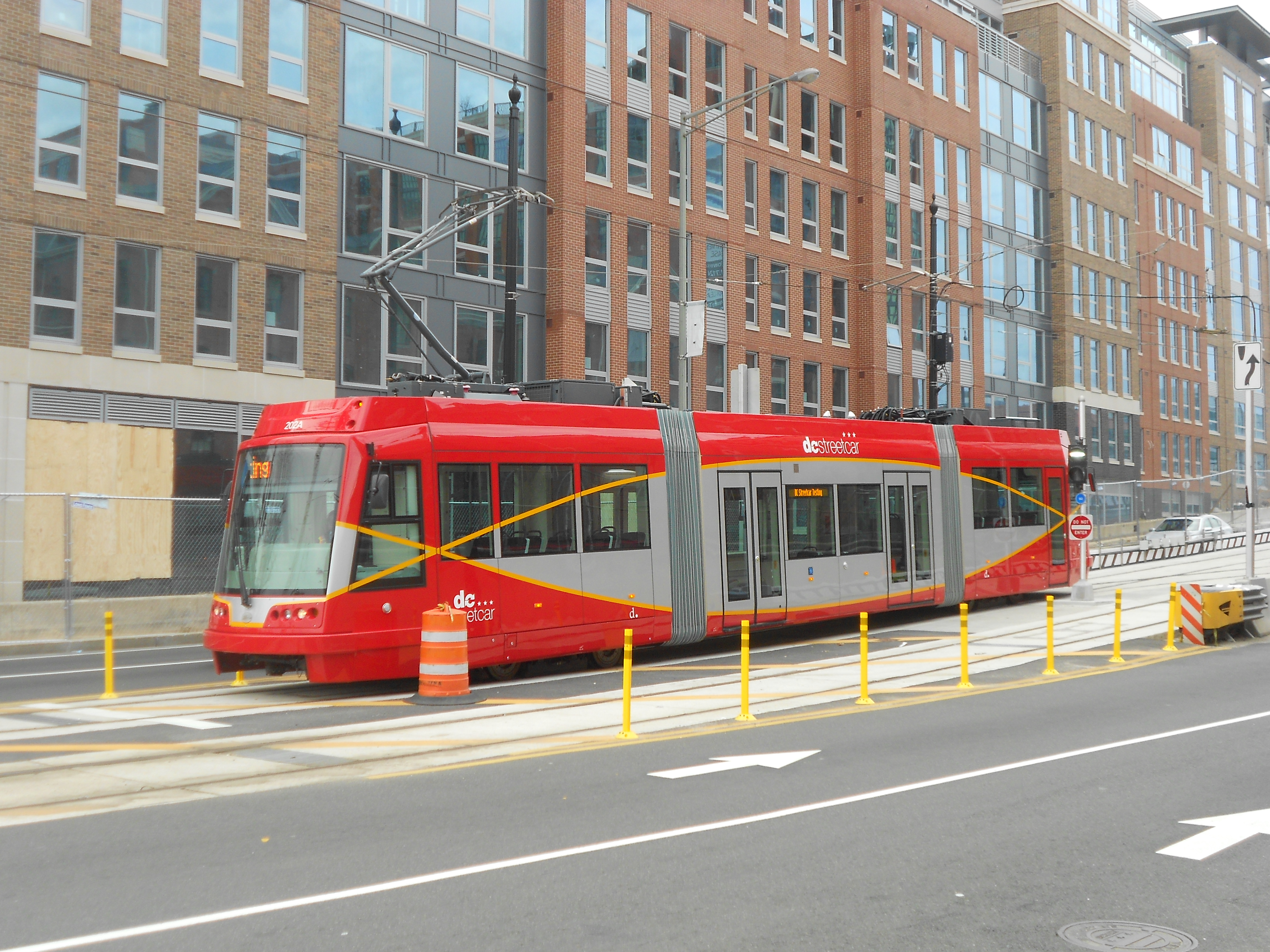
A United Streetcar-built streetcar to be used on the DC Streetcar system being tested along H Street NE in December 2014.

The D.C. government owned six streetcars that served the system, built by two manufacturers to very similar designs.

The first three streetcars, numbered 101 through 103, were ordered in 2005 and built in the Czech Republic in 2007 by Inekon Trams, for the Anacostia line, but because of delays in the start of construction of the line in Washington, they were stored in the Czech Republic until December 2009. They are model 12 Trio. The second set of streetcars, initially numbered 13-001 through 13-003 (subsequently renumbered 201–203), were built in the U.S. in 2013 by United Streetcar, of Oregon, based on a Skoda design (model Skoda 10T) that was originally developed jointly by Inekon and Skoda, and the shared design history explains the similarity between the two designs. They are United Streetcar model 100. The first United car was delivered to DC Streetcar in January 2014 and the third and last in June 2014. Visually, the United units differ from the Inekon cars in appearance with different fiberglass driver compartments, and cowling, but the overall dimensions are identical.

Each car was 8 ft (2.438 m) wide and 66 feet (20.12 m) long, and each car consists of three connected sections, a design known as an articulated streetcar.

=== Rolling stock problems ===
Although DDOT awarded contracts to United Streetcar to build streetcars for the H Street/Benning Road line in mid-2011, these contracts were withdrawn and new bids solicited after the contract process was found to be flawed. D.C. City Council member Mary Cheh, chair of the council's transportation committee, said the DDOT's management of the streetcar project had lost the confidence of the public and that she would seek legislation establishing an independent authority to run the system. A new contract was awarded to United Streetcar in April 2012, for two streetcars, and the order was expanded to three cars in August 2012.

== Lines ==
=== Operated lines ===
==== H Street NE/Benning Road Line ====
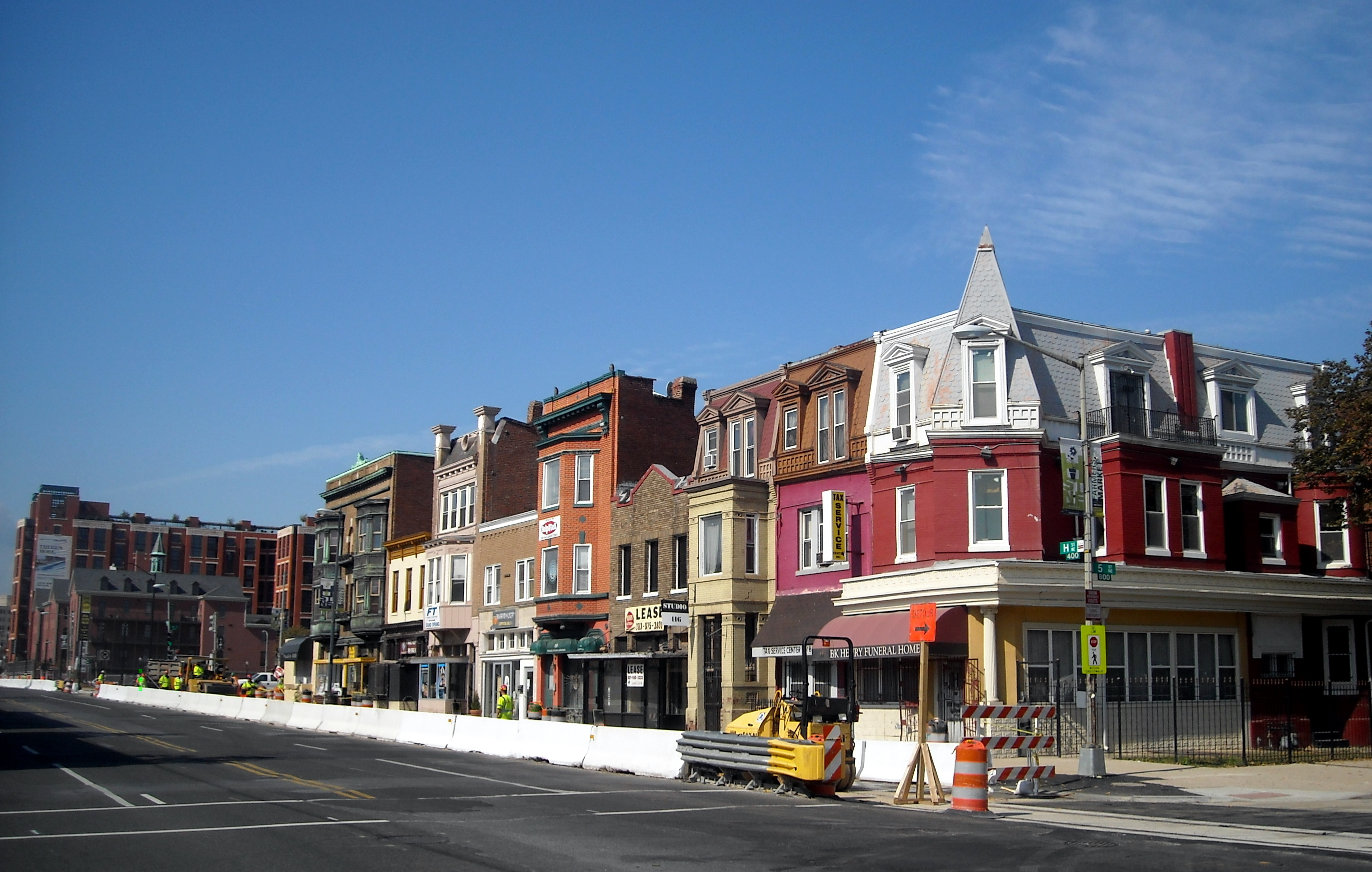
Construction of the H Street NE/Benning Road Line in October 2009

In 2003, then-Mayor Anthony A. Williams unveiled a draft Strategic Development Plan which proposed redeveloping and revitalizing six blighted areas of the city, including H Street NE and Benning Road. Among the proposals to revitalize H Street was the construction of a streetcar line to downtown D.C. in five to 10 years. On January 20, 2006, the District of Columbia Department of Transportation announced that it would build a $13 million streetcar line on H Street NE, from Union Station to Benning Road and the Minnesota Avenue Metro station as part of its Great Streets initiative, on much of the same route established by the Columbia Railway Company in 1870. By 2008, the extension to the Minnesota Avenue Metro station had been dropped. Streetcar tracks were installed on H Street as part of the H Street/Benning Road Great Streets project that was started in December 2007 and ended on June 30, 2011.

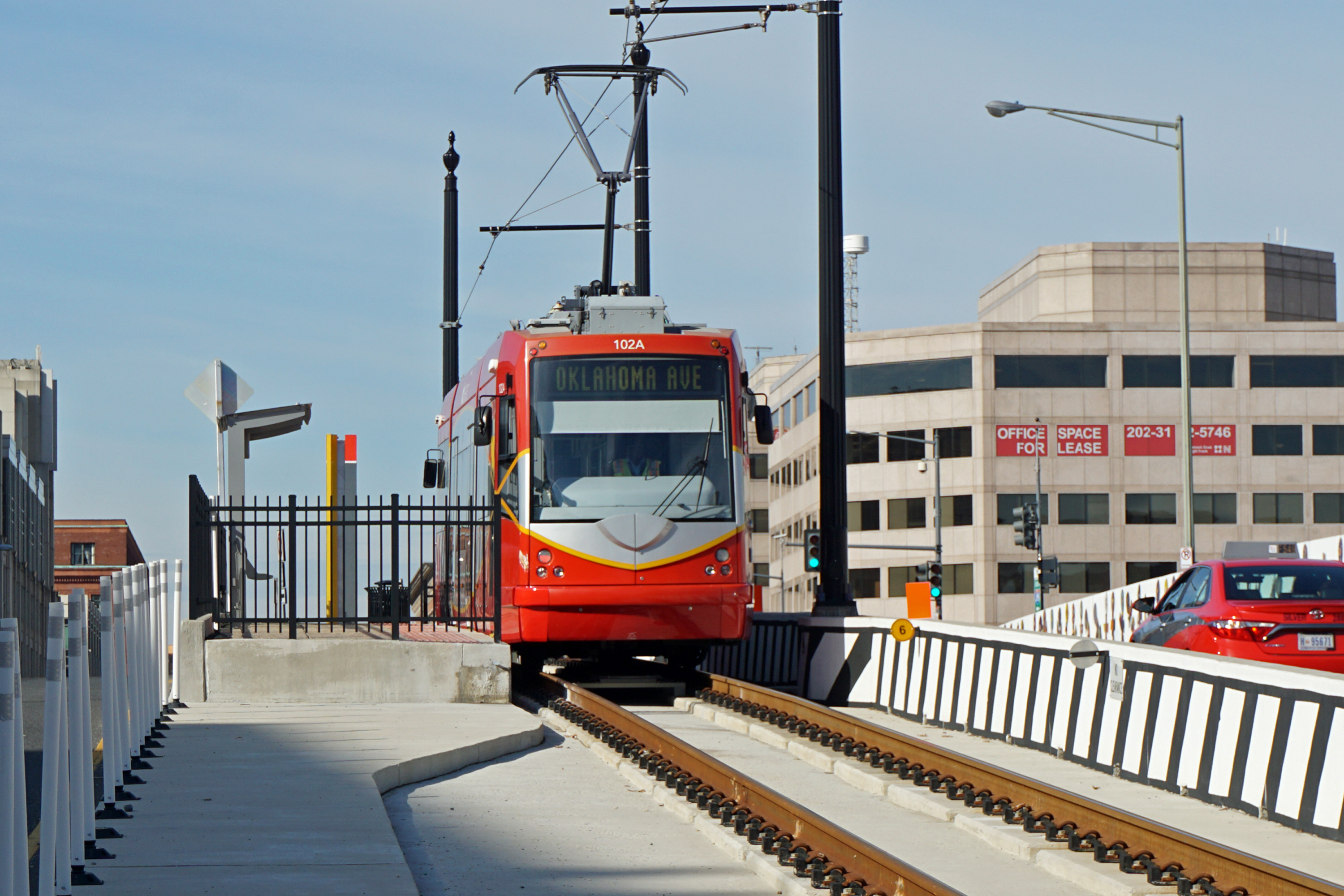
DC Streetcar at Union Station stop at the end of the H Street NE line.

In late August 2011, DDOT announced the H Street Line would begin operation in the summer of 2013. City officials said all platform stops had been constructed along the route, but overhead electricity lines, turnarounds at each end of the line, a streetcar overnight holding facility ("car barn"), maintenance facility, and three power substations remained to be built. On December 17, 2012, DC Streetcar officials said only 20 percent of the H Street line remained to be completed, and that they anticipated streetcars to be rolling in October 2013. Testing on the H Street-Benning Road Line began in August 2014, with a planned opening date for the line in late 2014. After more delays, the line had been tentatively projected to open in January 2015, but on January 16 the DDOT's director Leif Dormsjo announced that the Department would no longer issue any estimates for an opening date and that he intended to reorganize the project's management team. On February 21, 2015, a brief flash fire was ignited on the top of a streetcar in simulated service. In early March 2015, DDOT suggested that the project may be scrapped entirely, if an outside review being conducted by the American Public Transportation Association found "fatal flaws", but the findings, released on March 16, found no "fatal flaws" in the project. Dan Malouff, a writer for the Greater Greater Washington website, reported on July 10, 2015, that a review prepared for the DDOT had identified 33 causes for continued delay in rolling out fare service. He said that none of the reported causes for delay were considered "fatal", but the DDOT had not yet responded to the report with a prediction as to when all the problems would be attended to.

The DC Streetcar's H Street/Benning line eventually began public service operations on February 27, 2016.

As of December 2021, DDOT intended to extend the line by two miles east (3.2 km) to the Benning Road Metro stop. This proposed extension was delayed indefinitely in 2023.

In 2025, construction of 24/7 bus and streetcar-only lanes was planned between 3rd Street NE and Benning Road, alongside improvements to bus stops and transit signal priority.

=== Lines partially constructed but never finished or lines never built ===
==== Anacostia Line ====
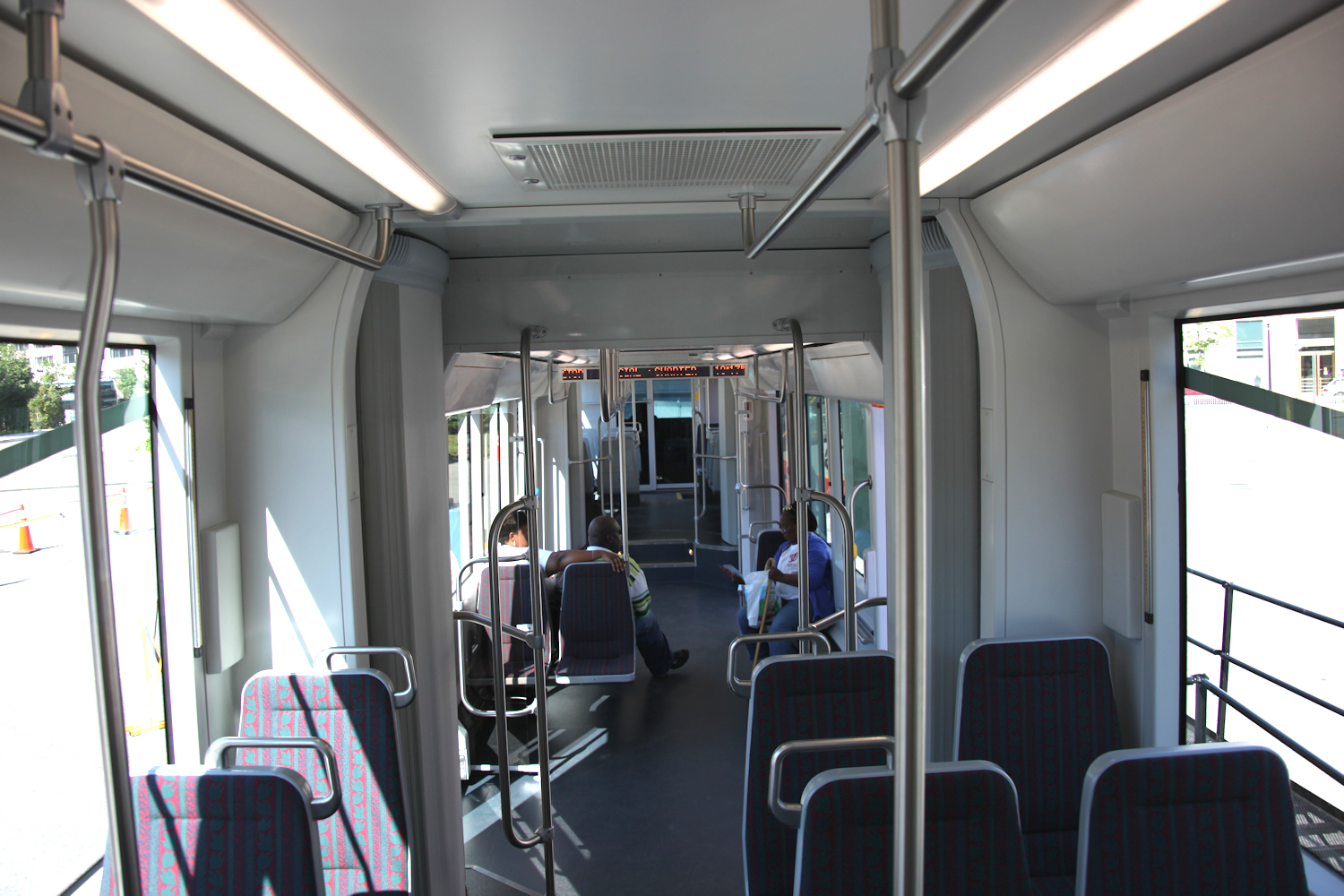
Interior of a DC Streetcar vehicle constructed in 2006–7 for use on the Anacostia line.

Ground was broken for the Anacostia Line on November 13, 2004. However, 10 months into the project, DDOT and Metro temporarily mothballed the streetcar line. Two days after the groundbreaking, CSX announced it would abandon the railway track but refuse to allow the city to use it for the streetcar project. DDOT officials say they believed that only the city and CSX owned the land under the tracks, but a legal review found that CSX was not the only private owner. The city was unwilling to build the project on the CSX tracks, only to have the other owners demand payment in the future. CSX disputed these claims, saying that it had the legal right to lease the tracks and land in perpetuity to the city for $16 million. Subsequently, DDOT announced that the streetcars would run on city streets instead of heavy railroad track, angering local residents who said the streetcars would worsen traffic congestion, eliminate parking, and reduce bus service.

DDOT and Metro announced in April 2006 that work on the revised streetcar line in Anacostia would start again in a few months. The new deadline for completion of the now-$10 million, 1.1-mile (1.7 km) line was set for the spring of 2008. DDOT opened bids for the now-$45 million contract to construct the Anacostia Line's tracks and infrastructure in August 2008. In April 2009, DDOT announced that the Anacostia streetcar line would not be complete until at least 2012. The delays had caused the warranty on the mothballed Czech-produced streetcars to expire, and storage costs were running $860,000 a year. Track to the Anacostia station finally began to be laid in September 2009, with a completion date in the fall of 2012.

On August 26, 2010, DDOT officials ordered construction of the Anacostia Line shut down after city officials refused to extend the construction contract or give a new contract to another firm. Although $25 million had been spent over the past two years, rails at the intersection of Firth Stirling Avenue SE and Suitland Parkway were buried under asphalt and weeds grew among the rails at South Capitol Street and Bolling Air Force Base. In 2014, DDOT said it was planning to spend $64 million to begin construction on the Anacostia Line Extension from the Anacostia Metro station to the 11th Street Bridges. The agency said it would also spend another $16 million to acquire the right-of-way currently owned by railroad company CSX Transportation and $15 million to build a car barn for the line extension. DDOT applied for a $20 million National Infrastructure Investments — Consolidated Appropriations Act grant to assist it in building the extension. However, as of January 2023, no further work has taken place on the line.

=== Proposed lines ===
In October 2010, D.C. officials unveiled tentative plans to build a streetcar line up Georgia Avenue. The city began holding public hearings on construction of the line ahead of schedule, due to the imminent 2011 closing of Walter Reed Army Medical Center. The streetcar line was part of a proposed $500 million, 62-acre (25 ha) mixed-use housing, office, and retail development that would begin construction in 2013. D.C. officials moved up hearings on (and potential construction of) the Georgia Avenue Line because the redevelopment of the Walter Reed site would be heavily dependent on the streetcar reaching the area by the time the new homes and businesses opened. In March 2011, the Washington Business Journal said that the city's reuse plan for its portion of the Walter Reed Campus included a retail hub serviced by a streetcar line.

In January 2010, The Washington Post reported that the K Street Line would probably be the third line to be constructed. The K Street Line would extend from Union Station to K Street NE, then run west to 26th Street NW. It would link with the H Street/Benning Road Line at Union Station via a pedestrian bridge which would require passengers to alight at Union Station and board an unconnected line. The two lines would thus form a cross-city streetcar line, although not directly. DDOT officials confirmed in August 2011 that linking to the H Street Line was still the option. To help move the K Street line forward, the Downtown D.C. Business Improvement District (Downtown BID) proposed in March 2012 to fund a plan that would lay out how K Street should be reconfigured for streetcars, and how a K Street streetcar line would be planned, constructed, maintained, and serviced. The board of directors of the Downtown BID proposed a self-imposed $258 million tax on hotels and commercial property within the district to fund BID projects, which included the streetcar design proposal. It was included in the Constrained Long-Range Transportation Plan.

Another streetcar line was proposed for Maine Avenue SW. In October 2010, the D.C. government unveiled its long-awaited, $1.5 billion development proposal for the city's southwest waterfront district. This proposal included a DC Streetcar line down the middle of the entire length of Maine Avenue.

In May 2026, WMATA preposed a bus rapid transit line, the Gold line, which would traverse the route of the former streetcar line.

== Stations ==
| Station | Mile | Former connections |
|---|---|---|
| Union Station | Mile 0 | Metro Red Line, Metrobus, Amtrak, VRE, MARC, Commercial Buses |
| H St & 3rd St. NE | Mile .16 | Metrobus |
| H St & 5th St. NE | Mile .29 | None |
| H St & 8th St. NE | Mile .54 | Metrobus |
| H St & 13th St. NE | Mile .89 | None |
| Benning Rd & 15th St. NE | Mile 1.17 | Metrobus |
| Benning Rd & 19th St. NE | Mile 1.55 | None |
| Benning Rd & Oklahoma Ave, NE | Mile 1.9 | Metro Blue, Orange, and Silver lines at Stadium Armory via a 20 min walk |

== Accidents and incidents ==
- On September 8, 2016, a person was injured after a streetcar and a vehicle collided.
- On June 2, 2017, ten people were injured after a streetcar and bus collided.
- On June 23, 2018, a cyclist was killed when one of his bicycle tires got caught in the streetcar track, causing him to fall into the path of a charter bus.

== See also ==
- Light rail in the United States
- Streetcars in North America
