= Seattle Streetcar =

Modern streetcar system in Seattle, Washington

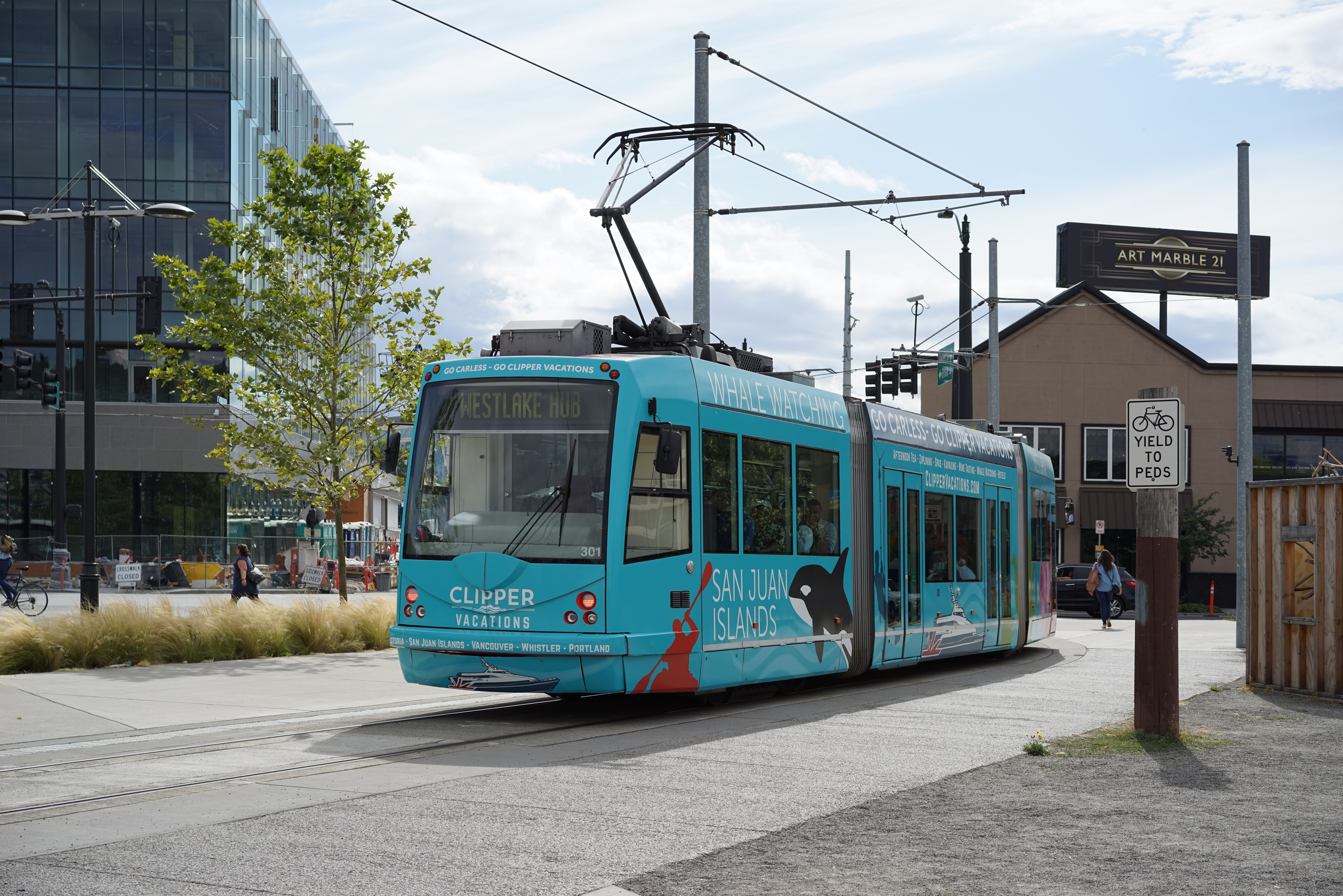
- Streetcar at Lake Union Park

Overview
- Owner: Seattle Department of Transportation
- Locale: Seattle, Washington
- Transit type: Streetcar
- Number of lines: 2
- Number of stations: 17 stops
- Daily ridership: 5,300 (weekdays, Q2 2026)
- Annual ridership: 1,519,100 (2025)
- Website: Seattle Streetcar

Operation
- Began operation: December 12, 2007
- Operator: King County Metro
- Character: Street running
- Number of vehicles: 3 Inekon 12 Trio; 7 Inekon 121 Trio

Technical
- System length: 3.8 miles (6.1 km)
- Track gauge: 4 ft 8 1/2 in (1,435 mm) standard gauge
- Electrification: Overhead line, 750 V DC
System map
The Seattle Streetcar network, as built and planned in 2019:
South Lake Union Streetcar (opened in 2007)
First Hill Streetcar (opened in 2016)
Center City Connector (on hold)

The Seattle Streetcar is a system of two modern streetcar lines operating in the city of Seattle, Washington. The South Lake Union line opened first in 2007 and was followed by the First Hill line in 2016. The two lines are unconnected, but share similar characteristics: frequent service, station amenities, and vehicles. Streetcars typically arrive every 10–15 minutes most of the day, except late at night. The streetcar lines are owned by the Seattle Department of Transportation and operated by King County Metro. The system carried 1,519,100 passengers in 2025.

== Current lines ==
=== South Lake Union Streetcar ===
The South Lake Union Streetcar is a 1.3-mile-long (2.1 km), seven-stop line serving the South Lake Union neighborhood of Seattle. Its route goes from the Westlake transit hub to the Fred Hutchinson Cancer Research Center in South Lake Union. The South Lake Union Streetcar connects with Link light rail (at the Downtown Seattle Transit Tunnel Westlake Station), the Seattle Center Monorail (at the 3rd floor of Westlake Center) and the RapidRide C Line (at several stops). The line opened to the public in 2007.

=== First Hill Streetcar ===
The First Hill Streetcar is a 2.5-mile-long (4.0 km), 10-stop line that connects Pioneer Square and Capitol Hill via Chinatown, Little Saigon, Yesler Terrace, and First Hill. The First Hill Streetcar connects with Amtrak and Sounder Trains (at King Street Station) and Link Light Rail (at both the International District/Chinatown and Capitol Hill stations). The line opened to the public in January 2016.

== Future expansion ==
=== Culture Connector ===
The Culture Connector project, formerly known as the Center City Connector, would connect the existing South Lake Union Streetcar at Westlake to the First Hill Streetcar with new tracks along 1st Avenue and Stewart Street in Downtown Seattle. It is planned to serve popular downtown destinations like Pike Place Market, the Seattle Art Museum, Colman Dock and Pioneer Square. The two existing lines would overlap within downtown, increasing frequencies, and the streetcars would operate in an exclusive transit lane. The project is expected to greatly increase ridership on the Seattle Streetcar Network to 20,000–24,000 riders per day (compared to about 5,000 today).

The project was scheduled to begin construction at the beginning 2018 (with utility relocation work starting in mid-2017) and be completed in 2020. In June 2017, the city accepted a $50 million federal grant for the project. In October 2017, members of the Seattle City Council debated cancelling the project and re-appropriating the funds for bus service, but no budget amendments were made.

In March 2018, Mayor Jenny Durkan ordered an investigation of the project and a construction halt for the duration of the review—estimated to take up to three months—in the wake of rising capital costs that were estimated to leave a $23 million shortfall in an overall $200 million budget for building the line. Mayor Durkan announced in January 2019 that the project would be revived if funding is found to cover the entire $286 million cost; due to new engineering and design work that would be required, its opening was pushed back to 2026 at the earliest. As of 2023, the project remains on hold and unfunded.

=== Broadway Extension ===
The currently halted Broadway Streetcar project would have extended the First Hill Streetcar a half-mile farther north on Capitol Hill into the commercial core of Broadway with two stops near Harrison Street and Roy Street at a cost of $28 million. The project would have also included an extension of the protected bike lanes to Roy Street and improvements to the surrounding streetscape. In December 2016, the project was placed on an indefinite hold after the city had completed design work to the 90% stage at a cost of $3 million. The planned extension was halted due to a lack of support from businesses for the design (particularly a shortage of loading zones for delivery trucks) and the financial plan, which would involve taxing properties located along the alignment.

=== Other proposals ===
The city government approved the study of a larger, citywide streetcar network in December 2008, estimated to cost up to $600 million. Among the lines studied were a central connector between Seattle Center and the Central District; an extension of the South Lake Union line to the University District; a line traveling to Fremont and Ballard; and an extension of the First Hill line via Rainier Avenue.

== Ridership ==
Ridership Statistics
Year	annual			weekday average
Year	SLU line	FH line	total	weekday average
2007	78,325		78,325	-
2008	414,200		414,200	1,300
2009	451,300		451,300	1,400
2010	520,800		520,800	1,800
2011	714,700		714,700	2,500
2012	750,300		750,300	2,500
2013	760,900		760,900	2,600
2014	707,700		707,700	2,200
2015	622,000		622,000	1,800
2016	518,249	840,049	1,358,298	-
2017	535,288	882,219	1,417,500	4,800
2018	513,523	1,159,904	1,685,700	5,500
2019	503,374	1,360,035	1,863,400	6,000
2020	89,414	660,029	743,600	1,700
2021	107,145	698,975	806,000	3,100
2022	180,211	937,394	1,093,500	3,600
2023	236,121	1,175,767	1,326,500	4,200
Sources: APTA Ridership Reports - years 2008-2015 and 2017-2023 (annual total and weekday average); SDOT 2021 Annual Streetcar Operations Report - year 2016, 2017-2021 (annual SLU and FH line); SDOT 2023 Annual Streetcar Operations Report - year 2022-2023 (annual SLU and FH line)

View chart definition.

== Rolling stock ==
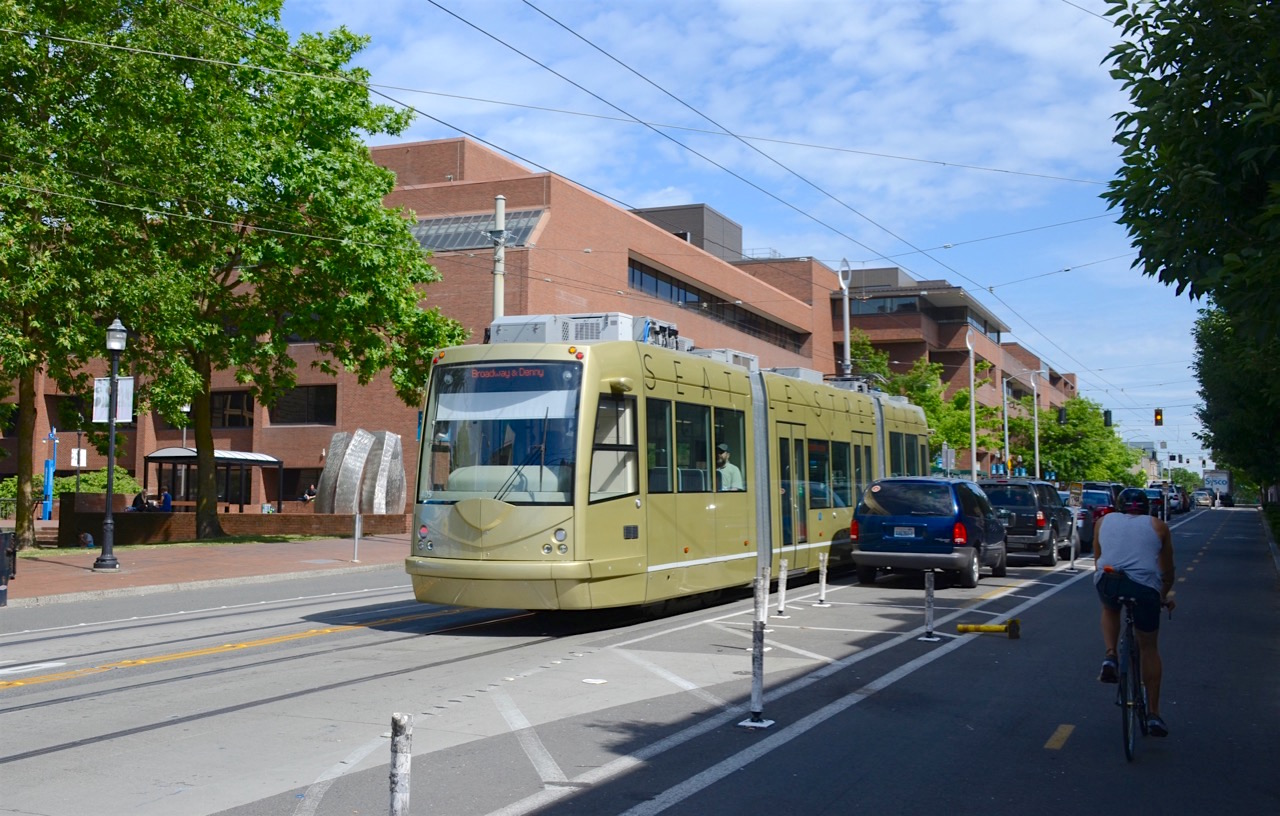
An Inekon 121-Trio streetcar operating on battery power on the First Hill Streetcar line in 2016

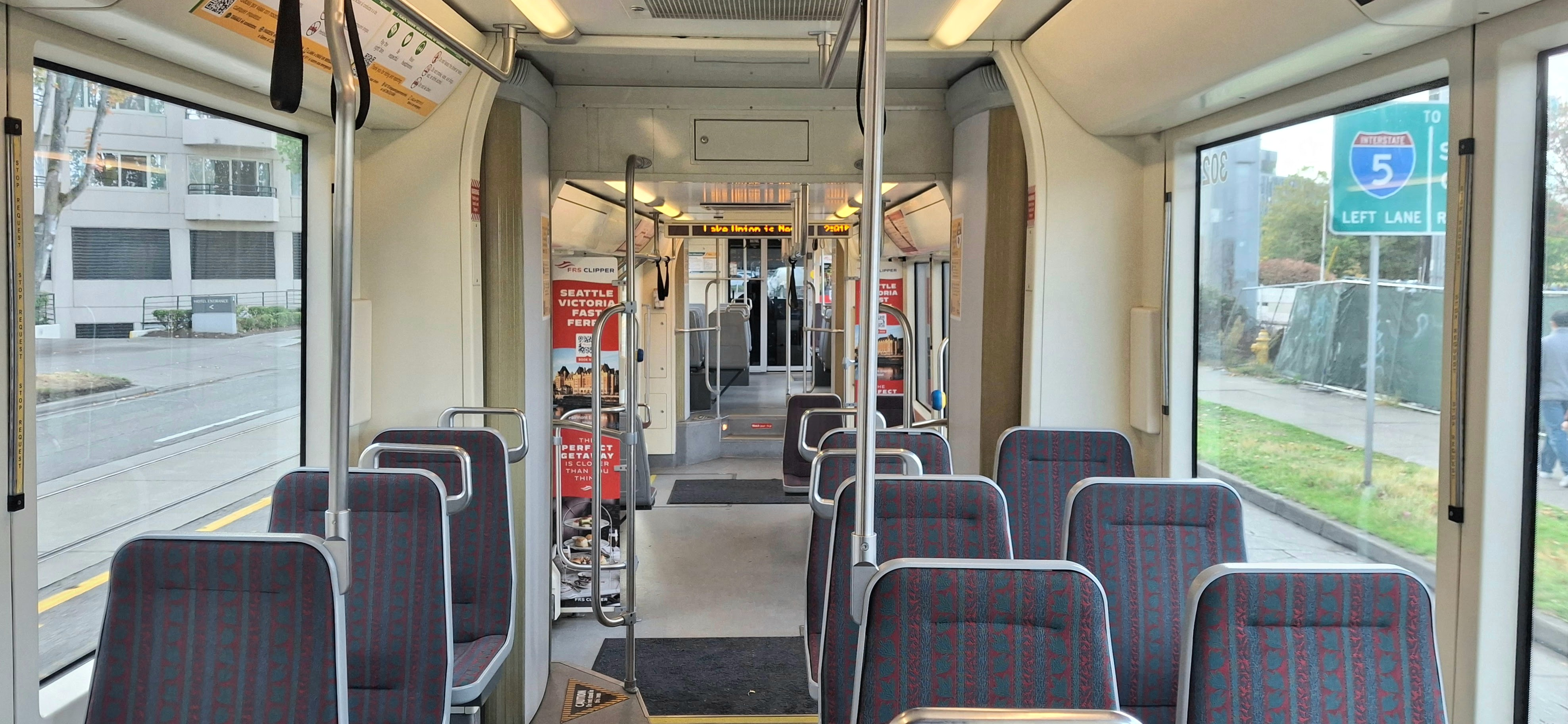
The interior of a Trio-12 tram on the South Lake Union line

The Seattle Streetcar system uses a fleet of streetcars manufactured by Inekon Trams in the Czech Republic. The original South Lake Union fleet, consisting of three double-ended low-floor Inekon Trio-12 streetcars measuring 66 feet (20 m) in length were delivered in 2007 and are numbered 301–303. A decade later, six Trio Model 121 streetcars were manufactured for the First Hill line, along with an additional streetcar for additional service in South Lake Union; these are numbered 401–407. Three of the model-121 streetcars were assembled in the Czech Republic and four were assembled, under contract, by Pacifica Marine in Seattle. The Trio Model 121 streetcars are equipped with electric batteries, which are used for a portion of the First Hill route. The delivery of the cars fell behind schedule, leading to delays in opening the First Hill Streetcar.

Before the Center City Connector was put on hold, in 2018, it was planned that the original South Lake Union fleet would be replaced with battery-equipped streetcars when the new connection opened. To this end, in October 2017, the Seattle Department of Transportation awarded a contract to Construcciones y Auxiliar de Ferrocarriles (CAF) to supply 10 100-percent-low-floor streetcars of CAF Urbos series for the Seattle Streetcar system. All were to be equipped with an on-board energy storage system enabling them to operate away from the overhead wires. Seven of the 10 were for the fleet expansion needed for the opening of the Center City Connector, then projected for 2020, and three for replacement of the oldest South Lake Union cars (Nos. 301–303, Inekon model Trio-12), which were to be sold after their replacements entered service. Cars 301–303 lack the capability of "off-wire" operation, which means they can only be operated on the South Lake Union line. However, SDOT canceled the contract with CAF in 2019 in view of the ongoing pause in the project amid escalating cost projections.

== See also ==
- Seattle Street Railway – The streetcar network that operated in Seattle between 1884 and 1941
- Waterfront Streetcar – A streetcar line that operated in Seattle between 1982 and 2005
- Link light rail – Regional light rail network operated by Sound Transit
- Sounder commuter rail – Regional commuter rail service operated by Sound Transit
- Streetcars in North America
- List of streetcar systems in the United States (all-time list)
