= Benning / Dorothy I. Height Neighborhood Library =

Public library in Washington, D.C.

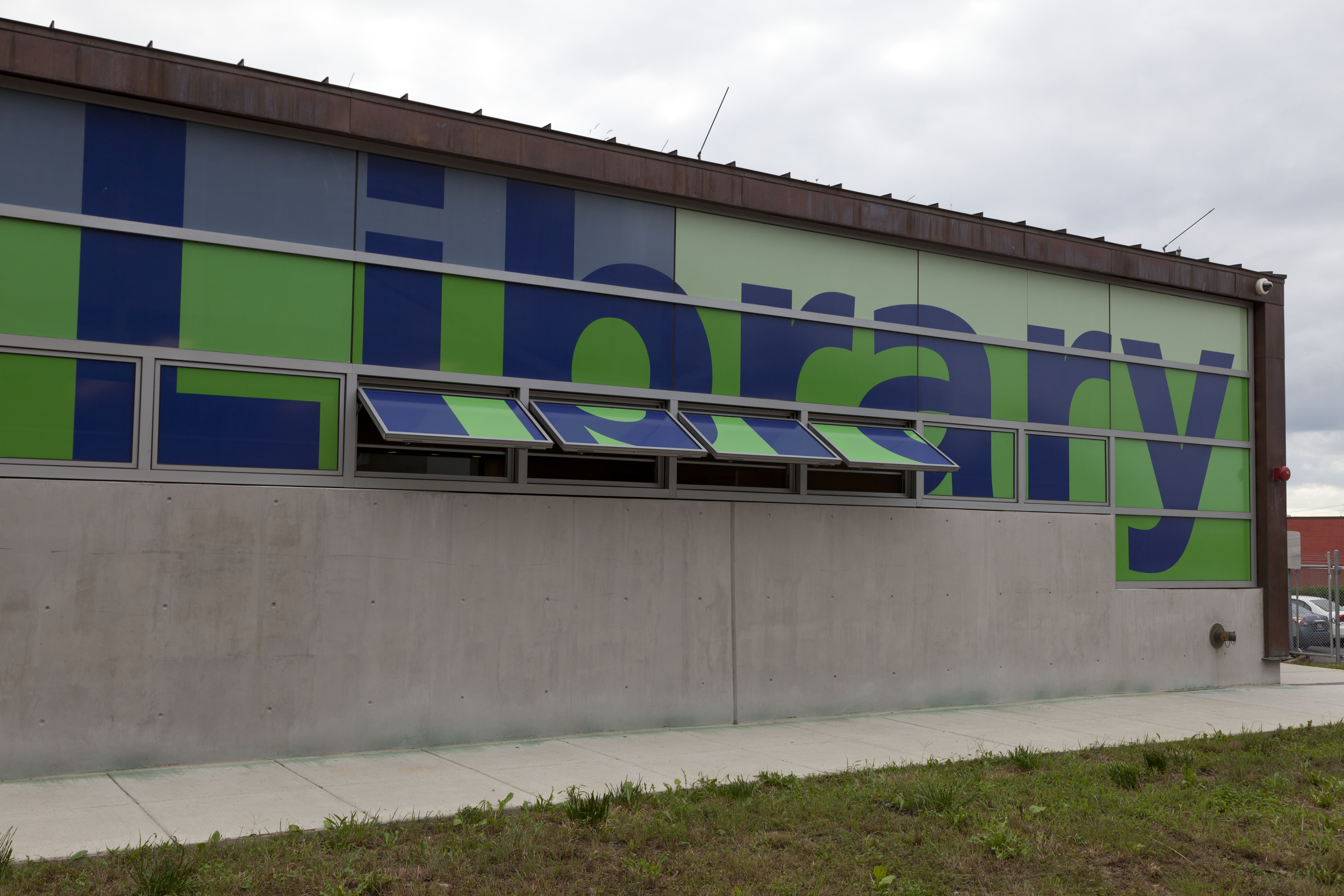
- 38.894099°N 76.947765°W
- Location: 3935 Benning Road NE, Washington, D.C. 20019, United States
- Type: Public library
- Established: 1962; reopened 2010
- Branch of: District of Columbia Public Library

Other information

The Benning / Dorothy I. Height Neighborhood Library is a branch of the District of Columbia Public Library system, located in Benning, a neighborhood in Northeast Washington, D.C.

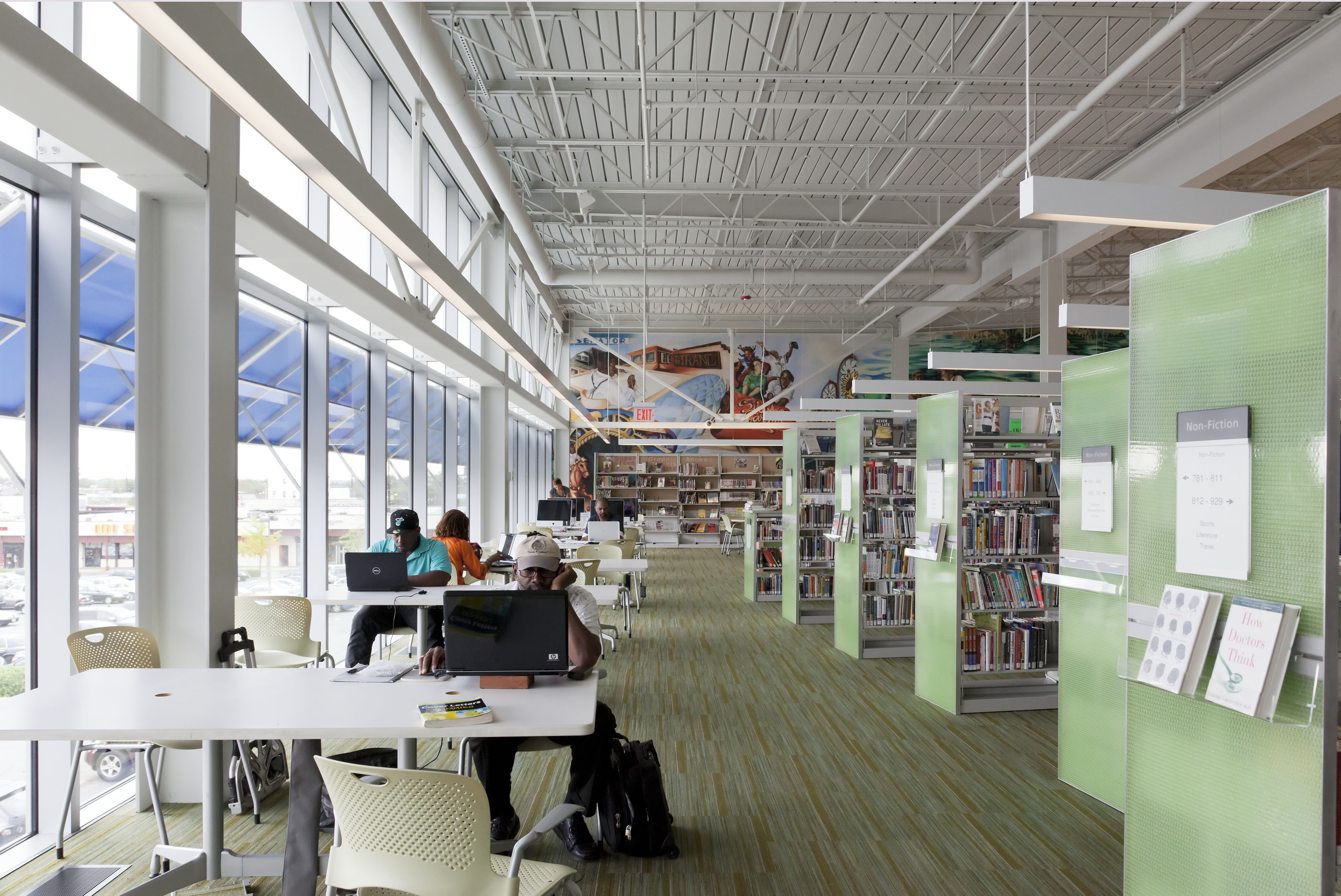
The interior of the new Benning / Dorothy I. Height Neighborhood Library, pictured in 2011.

The site at 3935 Benning Road NE was previously home to a library designed by Clark T. Harmon as part of a D.C. Public Works Program initiative, a one-story brick-and-concrete building that opened in 1962. The library had played an important role in the surrounding community since its inception. In 2004, the original library was closed to make way for a new structure on the same site, as part of a citywide push to revamp D.C.'s public libraries. An interim library served the Benning community while construction was underway.

The new Benning / Dorothy I. Height branch of the DCPL opened on April 5, 2010. It was named in honor of Dorothy Height, an influential civil rights and women's rights activist. The new library was designed by the architecture firm Davis Brody Bond Aedas. Construction of the two-story, 22,000-square-foot building cost $12 million. The library features public art from artists based in D.C.'s Ward 7.

== See also ==
- District of Columbia Public Library
- Benning (Washington, D.C.)
