= Inekon Trams =

Company in the Czech Republic

Inekon Trams, a.s.
- Type: Joint-stock company
- Industry: Transportation
- Founded: 2001
- Defunct: 2018
- Headquarters: Ostrava, Czech Republic
- Products: Trams
- Services: Tram refurbishment and repair, track rebuilding
- Parent: Inekon Group, a.s.
- Website: Official website

Inekon Trams, a.s. was a manufacturer of trams, or streetcars, located in the Czech Republic, and had supplied new trams to several cities in the Czech Republic and the United States. The company also carries out modernisation and repair of trams, as well as track reconstruction. It is a joint-stock company (Czech: Akciová společnost, or a.s.).

== History ==
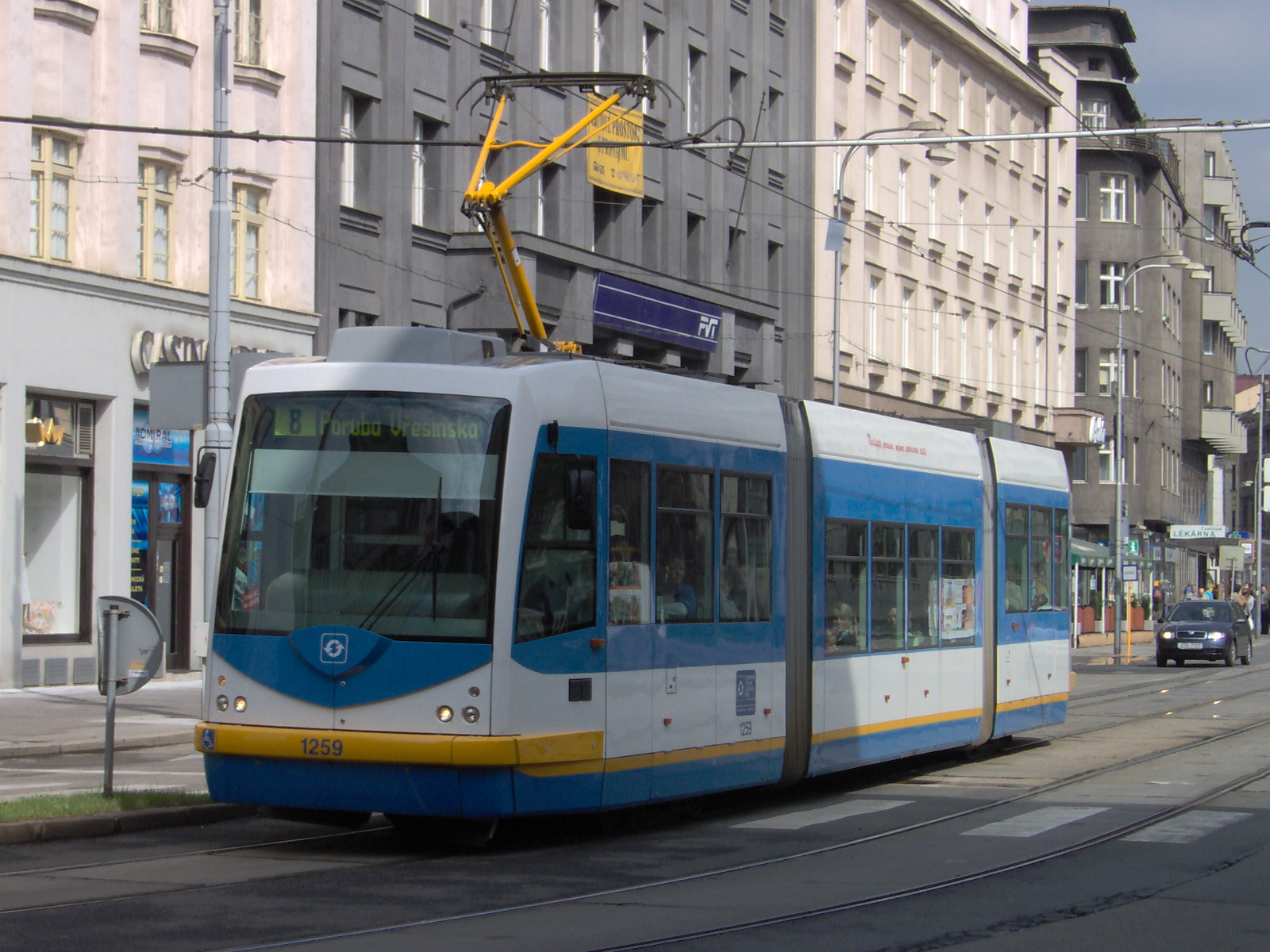
An Inekon 01-Trio in Ostrava

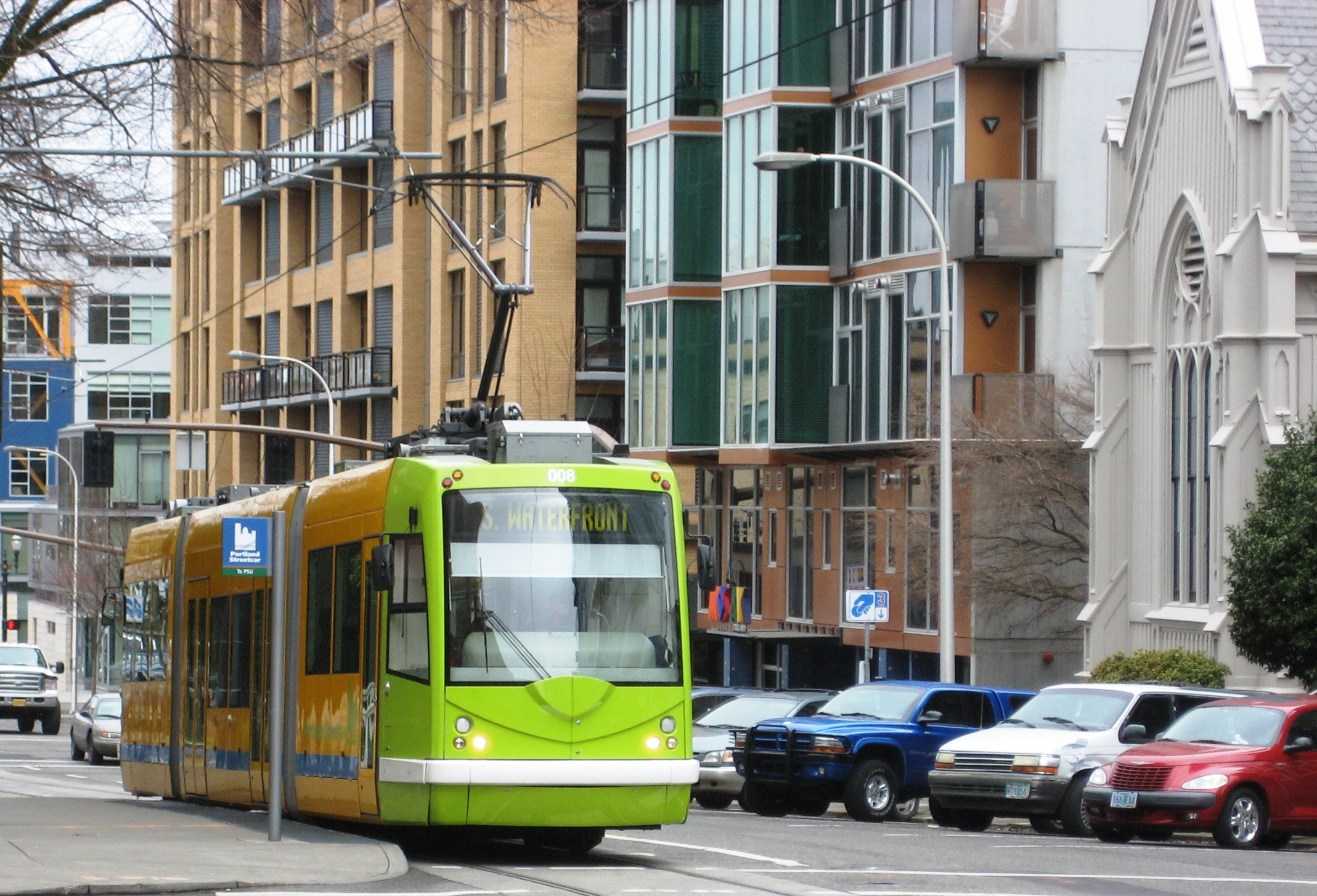
Portland car 008 is a 2006-built Inekon 12-Trio

Formed in 2001, the company was originally a joint venture of Inekon Group and the Ostrava Public Transport Agency (Dopravní Podnik Ostrava, or DPO), and was named DPO Inekon. The name was changed to Inekon Trams in 2005, after Inekon Group purchased the shares of DPO and became sole owner, but DPO's Ostrava facilities continue to be used for most production and assembly.

In the early 1990s Inekon Group tried to gain control of ČKD, which was one of the largest engineering companies in the country at the time, and which had produced almost 20,000 trams, including 14,000 Tatra T3. While the effort to acquire the company failed, some of ČKD's employees were dissatisfied with the new owners and decided to come over to Inekon. Thus, Inekon Group acquired engineers from one of the world's largest producer of trams.

From 1996 until 2001/2, parent company Inekon Group had participated in a joint venture with Škoda Transportation Systems, known as Škoda-Inekon, for the construction of trams. Most of the mechanical design work was undertaken by Inekon Group subsidiary Kolejová Doprava (in Prague), while the production was carried out by Škoda (in Plzeň), and the electrical propulsion equipment was made by Škoda and the Austrian company Elin EBG Traction. Marketing was also handled by Inekon Group. The Škoda-Inekon partnership built the Astra model, of which the unidirectional version, model 03T, was supplied to several Czech cities and the bi-directional version, model 10T, was supplied to two U.S. cities (Portland and Tacoma).

The partnership collapsed in 2001, and strong disagreements resulted in both companies filing lawsuits against the other. Škoda continued producing some of the same models on its own, and retaining the same model designations (such as 03T) as had originally been adopted under Škoda-Inekon, but with Inekon no longer involved. Inekon formed a new joint venture with DPO for production, using DPO's workshops at Martinov, but the design and development of new trams continued to be carried out by Kolejová Doprava, which remains a subsidiary of Inekon Group. For this reason, Inekon's 01-Trio is nearly identical to the Škoda 03T in most respects, while the same is the case for the Inekon 12-Trio and Škoda 10T, respectively. One transport operator, the Portland Streetcar, has a fleet that includes seven Škoda-Inekon 10T cars (built in 2001–2), three Inekon 12-Trio cars and one newer 10T built by United Streetcar under licence from Škoda, and all eleven have identical overall dimensions, configuration, and other technical specifications, and use mostly the same parts. Škoda and Inekon Group settled their differences in 2006, and even forged a new alliance specifically for the purpose of winning a large contract for new trams for Toronto, but that contract was awarded to a different manufacturer, and since then the two companies have continued to work separately.

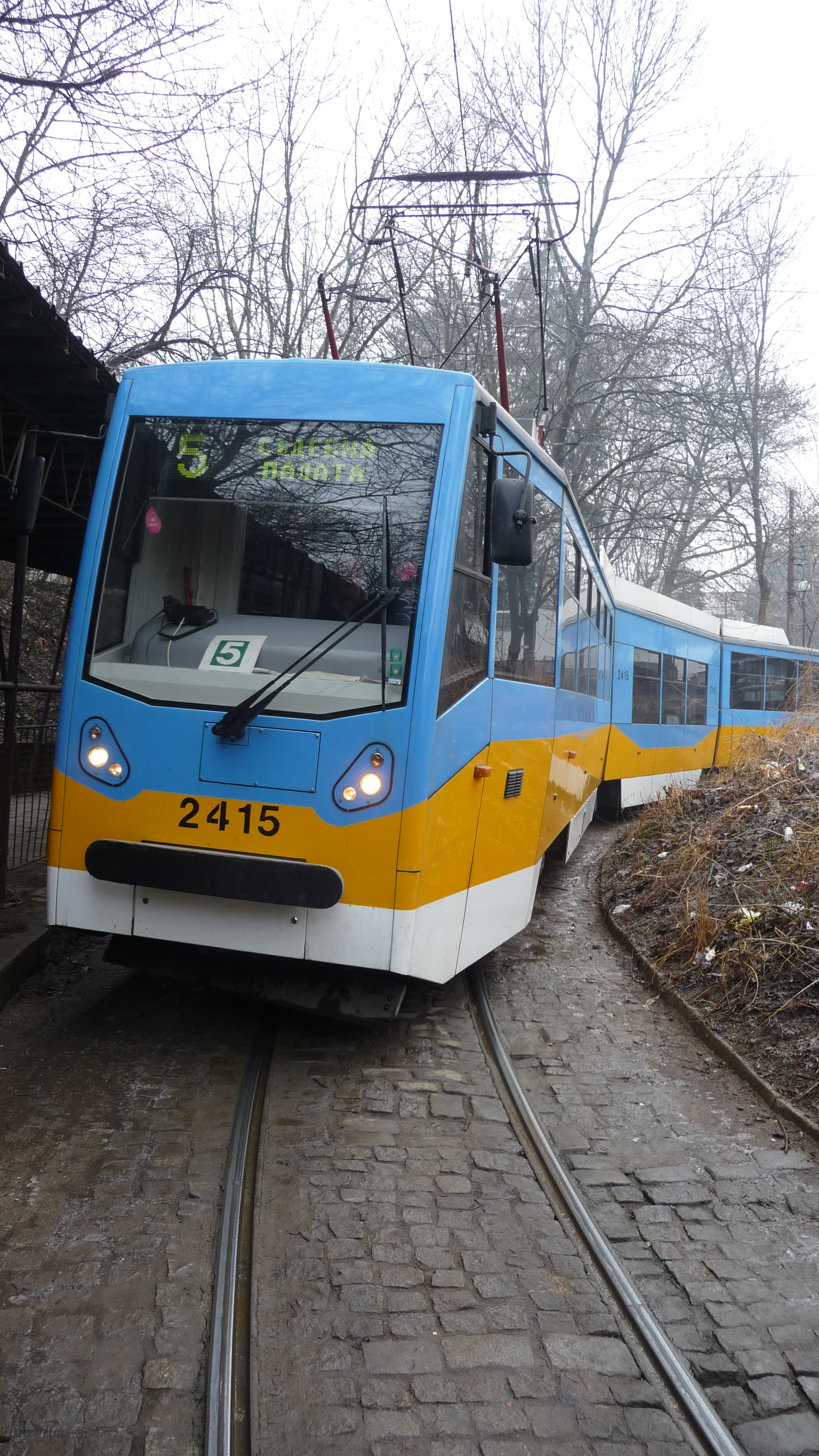
An Inekon-refurbished tram in Sofia, Bulgaria

The first tramcar completed by DPO-Inekon was Ostrava tram system's car 1251, a Trio delivered in 2002. Renamed Inekon Trams in 2005, the company developed additional tramcar designs and expanded into other types of work, in particular overhaul and modernization of older trams and reconstruction and upgrading of tracks. The tram system in Izhevsk, Russia, awarded Inekon a 1 million-euro contract for track repair in 2006, and the city of Ufa also contracted with Inekon for tramway upgrading. Trams have been modernized for Sofia, Bulgaria, and other cities.

In 2007, the Portland Streetcar and Seattle Streetcar systems both took delivery of three Inekon 12-Trio cars each, all six built and assembled in the Czech Republic.

In 2011, Inekon won a tender for 6 new tramcars for the Seattle Streetcar system's "First Hill" line. The Czech company partnered with Seattle-based Pacifica Marine, a transport vehicles refurbisher, in order to meet the requirement of 60% of U.S. content, which is needed for the project to be eligible for Federal funding. While the manufacturing of the major parts would still take place in the Czech Republic, assembly, painting and testing was to be carried by the American company for this order. At the time, Inekon and Pacifica planned to bid also for streetcar projects in other U.S. cities, with plans to eventually start building streetcars completely in the U.S., similar to United Streetcar's partnership with Škoda. The Seattle order was later expanded by one car, to seven cars, but after production fell behind schedule, the plans for U.S. assembly were scaled back. Three of the new Seattle cars were assembled in the Czech Republic, and only four by Pacifica Marine in Seattle. The three Inekon trams purchased by Seattle earlier, in 2007, were model 12-Trio, whereas the new cars purchased by Seattle in 2013–15 are a variant called 121-Trio, which is capable of operating on batteries only (without power from overhead wires) part of the time.

Due to low figures of production, Inekon's manufacture of trams has been loss-making and the parent company has to subsidise the tram division from its other activities, such as constructing large cement mills (currently planned or under construction in Egypt, Morocco, Syria and Vietnam), modernisations of trains as well as train corridors and construction of large sewage plants (in Ireland, the Netherlands, Italy, Latvia, etc.). Nevertheless, Inekon maintains capacities for production of trams as well as for their development, aiming to sell them especially in the American, Russian and Chinese tramway markets.

Insolvency proceedings were initiated in 2018 at the request of the creditor.

== Tramcar models ==
Models of new trams currently available include the Trio series, Superior and Pento. All are low-floor models, either partially or fully, and are articulated.

=== Trio ===
The Trio is a three-carbody-section, four-axle (two-bogie) design, in which the low-floor area represents 50% of the entire vehicle floor area. The overall length is 20.13 metres (66.0 ft).

The 01-Trio is a single-ended (uni-directional) version, buyers of which have included (as of 2008) the transport agencies in Olomouc and Ostrava. The first car was built in 2002, for Ostrava's tram system (DPO).

The 12-Trio is a double-ended (bi-directional) model designed for export. The standard model is designated as 12-Trio, but in 2012–13 Inekon introduced a variant that is capable of limited operation on batteries only, and this is designated 121-Trio. As of 2016, the 121 model has only been purchased by Seattle.

Trams of this type have been purchased by three U.S. cities, as follows:

- Portland Streetcar: 3 cars (nos. 008–010), built in 2006 and delivered in 2007
- Seattle Streetcar: 10 cars by 2016. First order was for 3 cars, delivered in 2007. Another six cars were ordered in late 2011 for use on a planned second line, and these are model 121-Trio, capable of "off-wire" operation part of the time. A seventh car was added to the order in late 2012. Delivery began in 2015.
- The Department of Transportation of Washington, D.C. for the D.C. Streetcar line: 3 cars, completed in 2007 but not shipped to the USA until late 2009, due to delays in construction of the tram line and carhouse (storage and maintenance building) in Washington.

All nine of the standard 12-Trio cars manufactured to date (in 2006–07) were equipped with propulsion control systems made by Elin EBG.

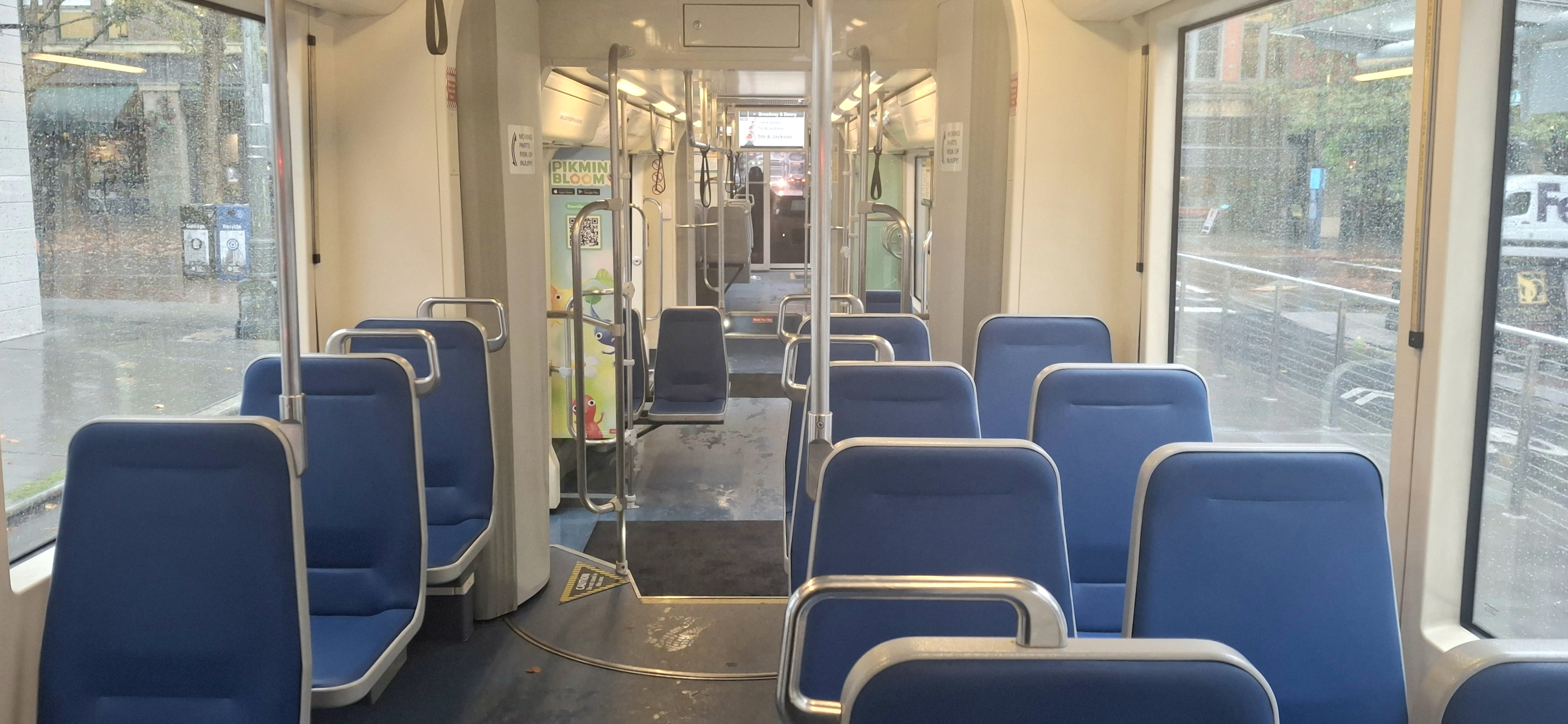
The inside of a Inekon 121 in Seattle

=== Other models ===
- Inekon 04, the Superior, is a three-section, 32.6-metre (107 ft) unidirectional car with at least 50% low-floor area. No trams of this design have been constructed thus far.
- Inekon 11, the Pento, is essentially a longer version of the Trio. It is a five-section, 30.2-metre (99 ft) unidirectional car with 64% low-floor area.
- Inekon Superior Plus was a design developed together with Škoda in 2008 for the Toronto Transit Commission's bid for 204 new streetcars. It is a 100% low-floor tram designed in order to meet specific requirements of the Toronto tramway tracks, especially its unusually small 36-foot (10.973 m)-radius curves. The tram's appearance was created by designer Patrik Kotas, who is also responsible for the look of Škoda's newest ForCity tram. The Škoda-Inekon consortium was not permitted to take part in the bidding process, which was in the end won by Bombardier, for its Flexity Outlook, which met the commission's Canadian content requirement.

== See also ==
- List of tram builders
