= Škoda 03 T =

Tram type

Škoda 03 T Astra (Anitra)
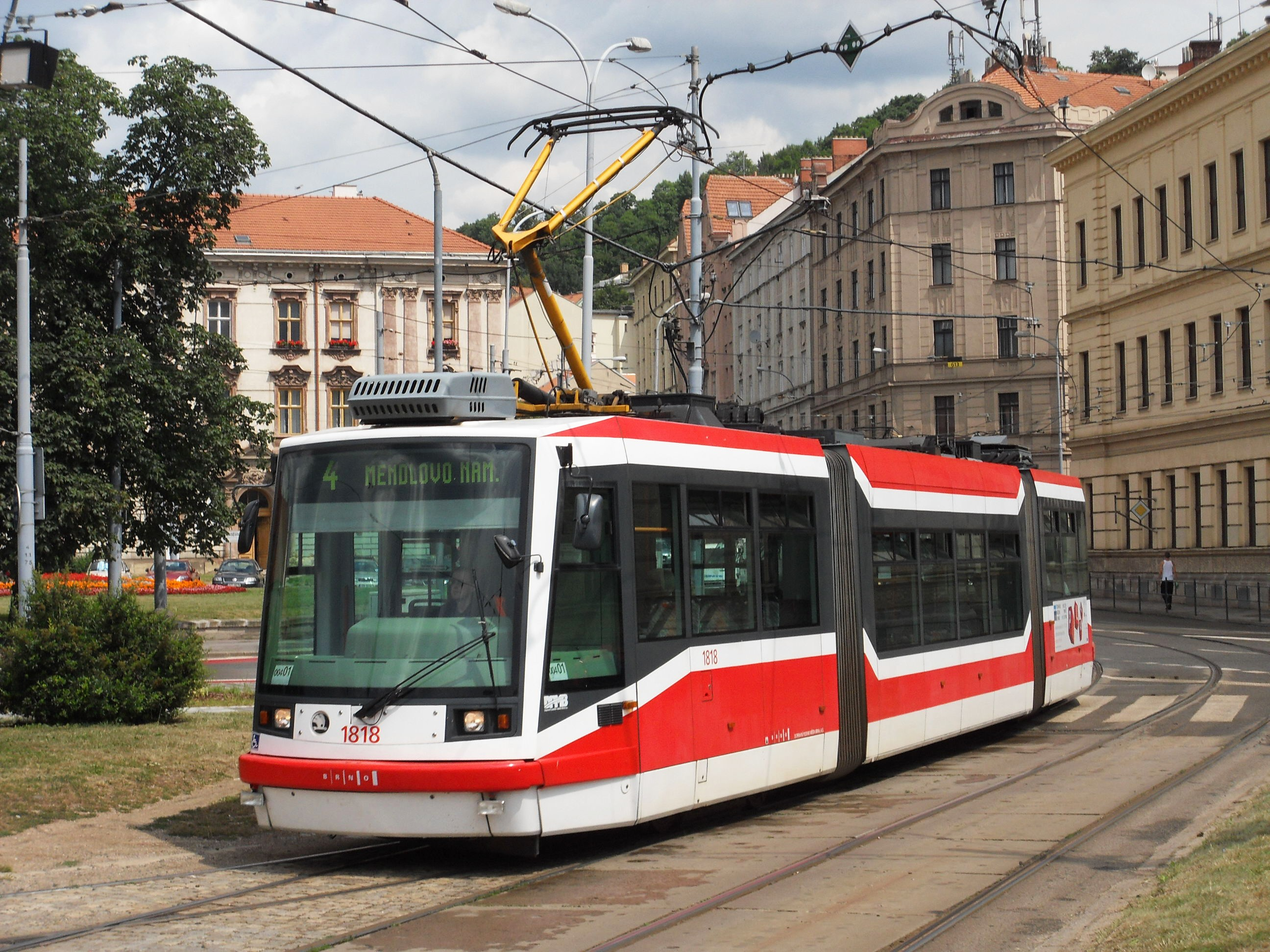
- Škoda 03T in Brno, June 2011
- Manufacturer: Škoda Transportation
- Assembly: Plzeň, Czech Republic
- Constructed: 1998–2005
- Capacity: 42 (Seated); 113 (Standing)

Specifications
- Train length: 20,090 mm (65 ft 11 in)
- Width: 2,460 mm (8 ft 1 in)
- Height: 3,440 mm (11 ft 3 in)
- Floor height: 350 mm (13.78 in); 780 mm (30.71 in)
- Low-floor: 50%
- Articulated sections: 2
- Maximum speed: 70 km/h (43 mph)
- Weight: 24.2 t (23.8 long tons; 26.7 short tons)
- Power output: 340 kW (460 hp) (4 × 85 kW or 114 hp); 360 kW (480 hp) (4 × 90 kW or 120 hp)
- Wheels driven: 100% (8/8)
- Bogies: fixed
- Track gauge: 1,435 mm (4 ft 8 1/2 in)

The Škoda 03 T (sold as Škoda Astra, later Škoda Anitra (Asynchronní nízkopodlažní tramvaj; Asynchronous Low-floor Tram)) is a three-section low-floor tram developed by Škoda Transportation and Inekon Group. The design was introduced in 1996, and the first car was completed in 1998. The joint venture between Škoda and Inekon was dissolved in 2001, after which Škoda continued to sell the 03 T, while Inekon formed a new partnership with DPO (Dopravní podnik Ostrava, the city transport company of Ostrava), known as DPO Inekon, and in 2002 began selling a nearly identical version of the Astra, under the name Trio.

The 03 T is uni-directional and has a low floor over half of its length. The front and rear sections, under which the wheels are placed, have a high floor; the middle section, between these, has a low floor.

Some other Škoda trams, such as the 05 T and 10 T, are based on the Astra.

== Deliveries and operation ==
City	Year	Delivered	In operation	Numbers	Note
Brno (Czech Republic)	2003–2006	17	17	1805–1821	
Most–Litvínov (Czech Republic)	2001–2002	2	1	201, 202	
Olomouc (Czech Republic)	1999	4	4	201-204	
Ostrava (Czech Republic)	1998–2001	14	14	1201–1214	
Plzeň (Czech Republic)	1998–2000	11	none	300-310	Nr. 300 withdrawn in January 2006 after accident, rest of the fleet withdrawn by 2021
TOTAL		48	36		

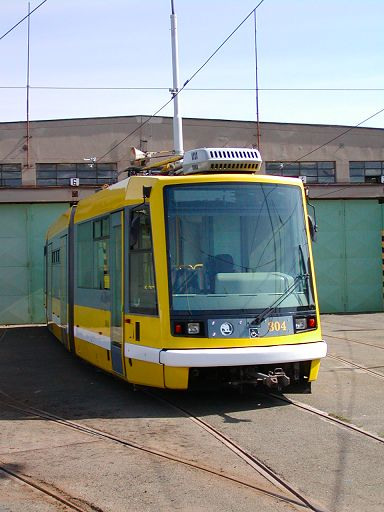
Škoda Astra in yellow livery of Plzeň transport company inside of the tram depot

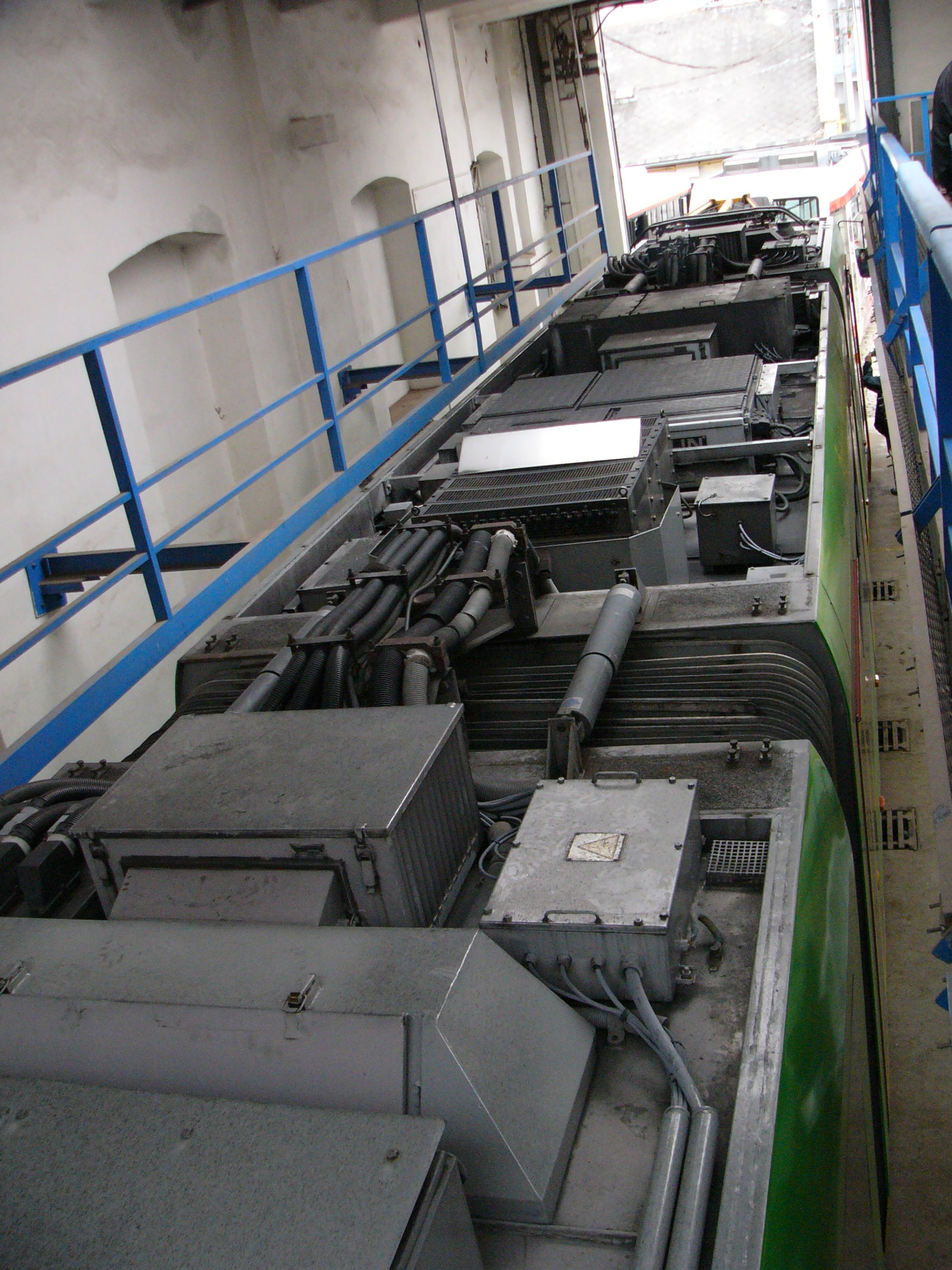
Mechanism for regenerative brake on the roof of a Škoda Astra.

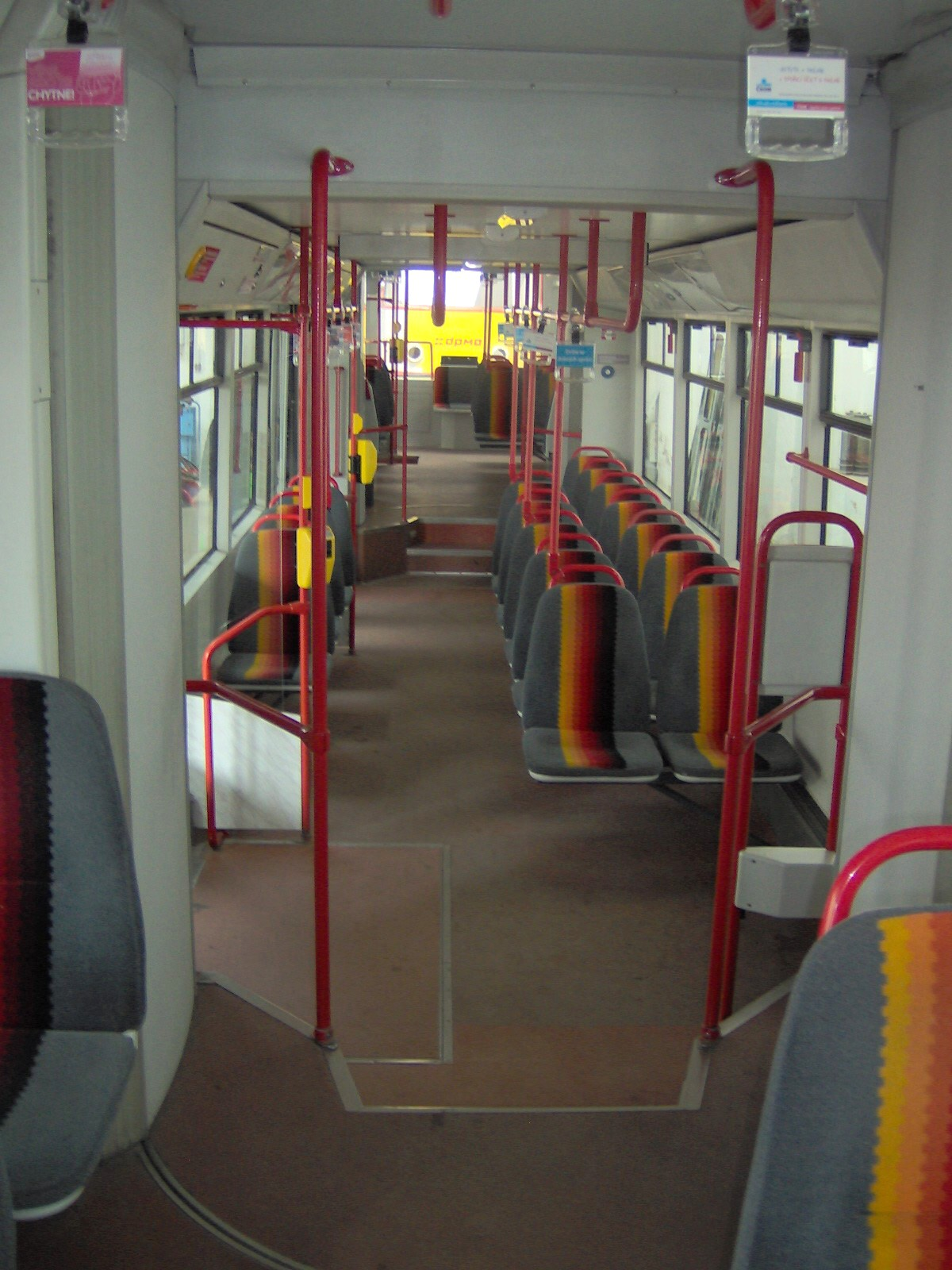
Interior of a Škoda Astra

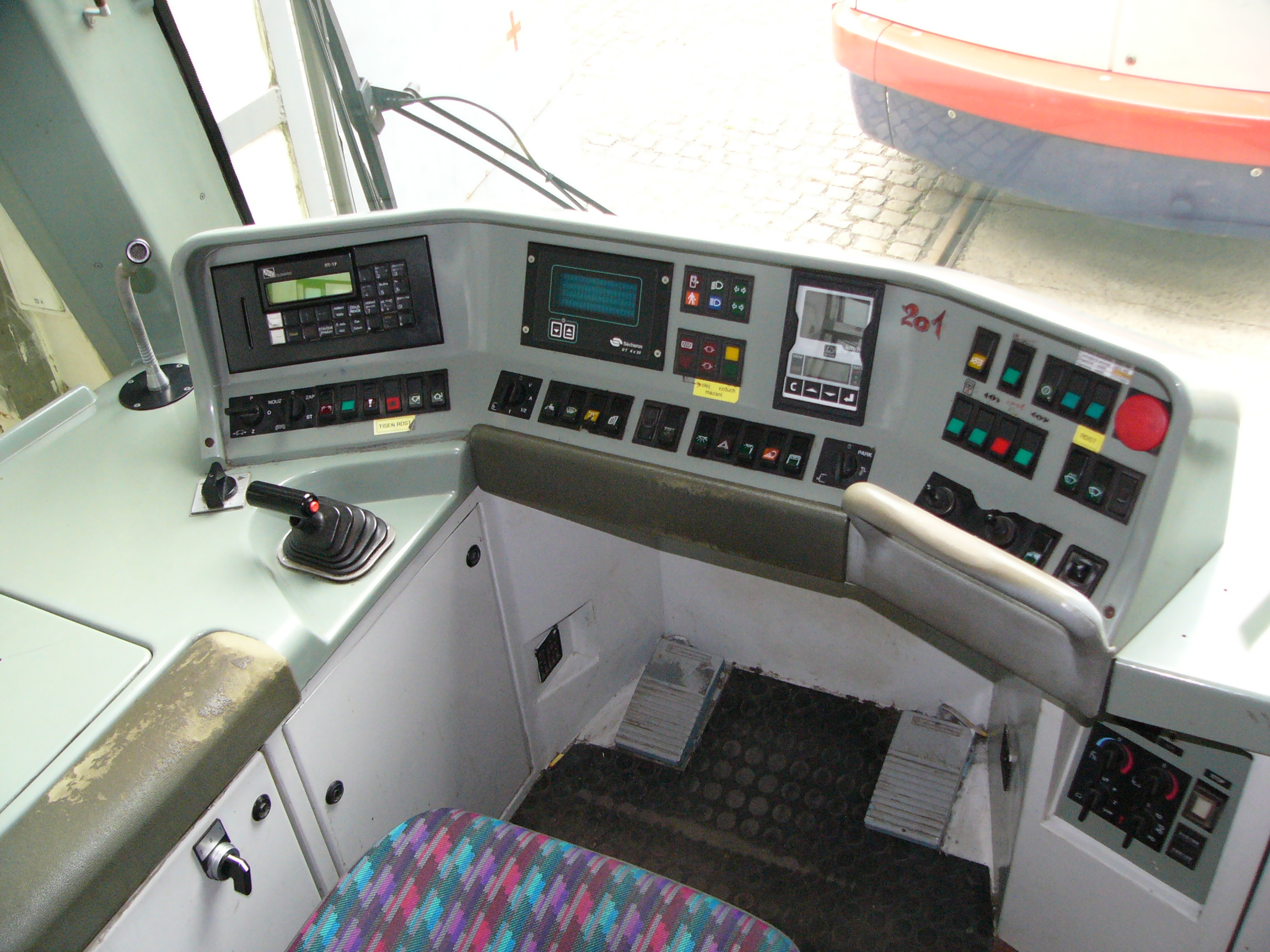
Operator's cab of a Škoda Astra.
