= Benning (Washington, D.C.) =

Coordinates: 38.895°N 76.9492°W

- Neighborhood of Washington, D.C.
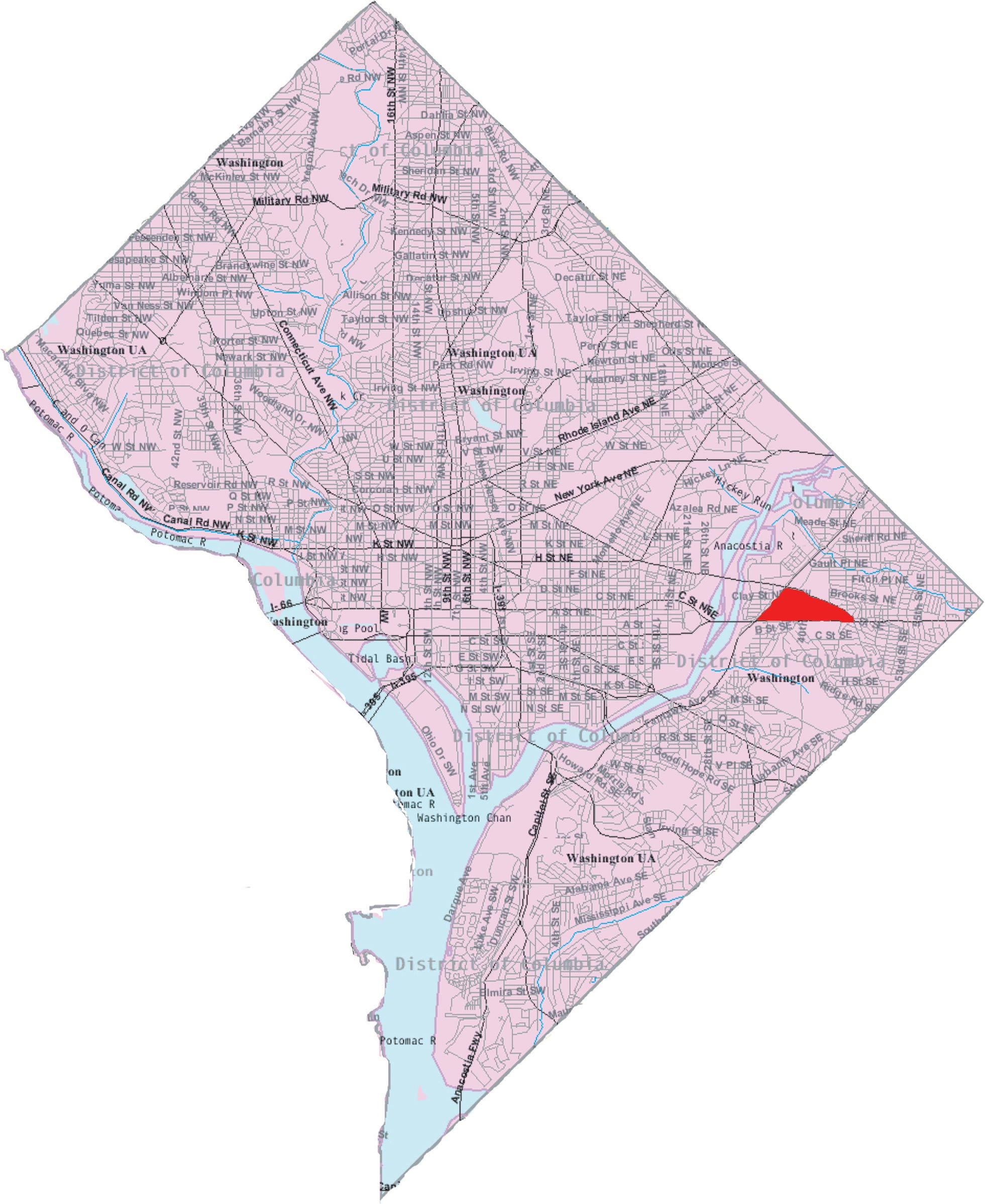
- Benning within the District of Columbia
- Country: United States
- District: Washington, D.C.
- Ward: Ward 7

Government
  - Councilmember: Wendell Felder

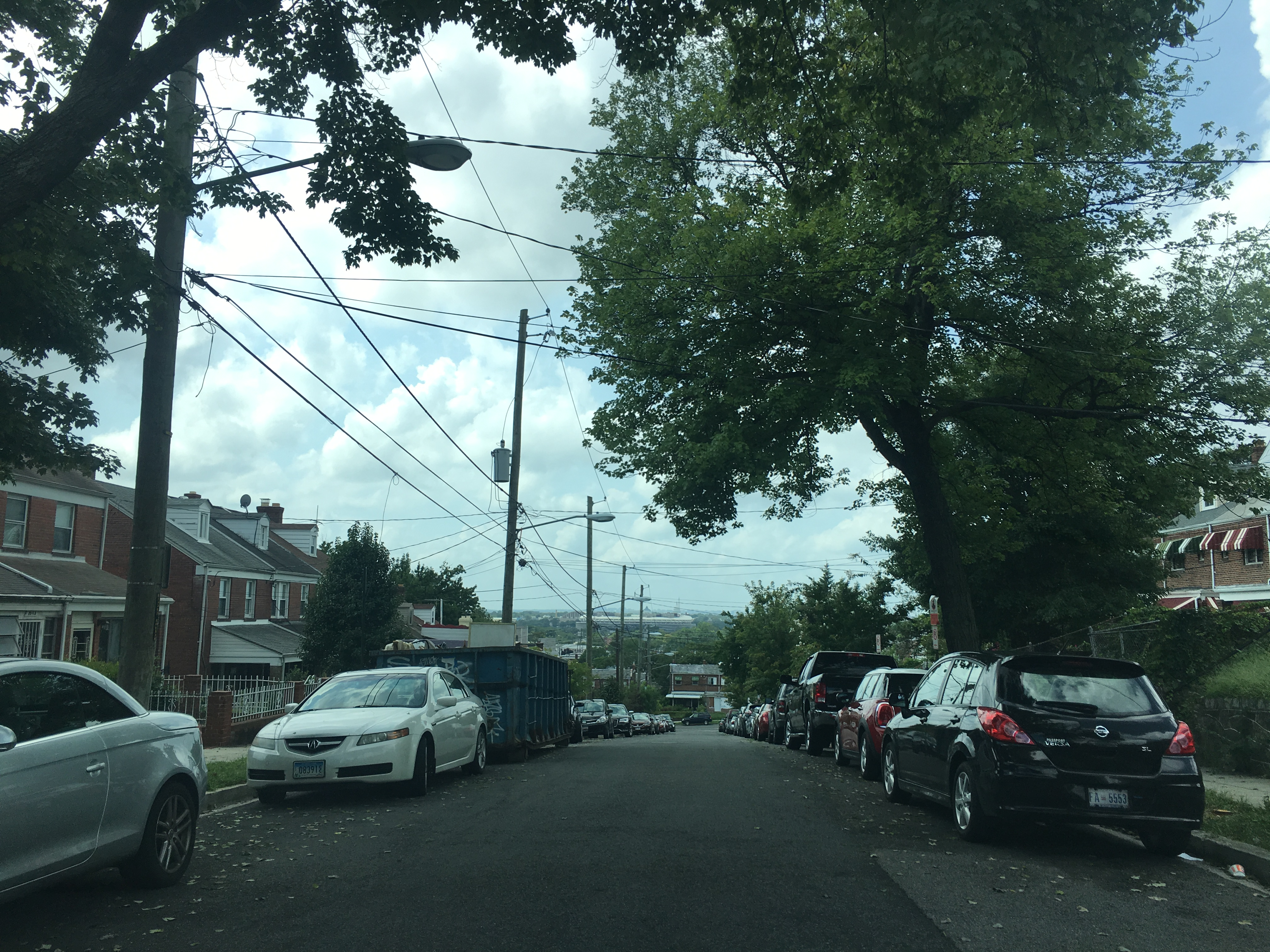
Benning neighborhood at the intersection of 40th St and Ames St. NE, September 2018

Benning is a residential neighborhood located in Ward 7 of Northeast Washington, D.C. It is bounded by East Capitol Street to the south, Minnesota Avenue to the west, and Benning Road (for which the neighborhood is named) on the north and east. It is served by the Benning Road station on the Blue and Silver Lines of the Washington Metro.

== Education ==
The District of Columbia Public Schools operates public schools. The District of Columbia Public Library operates the Benning Neighborhood Library.
