= Inekon 01 Trio =

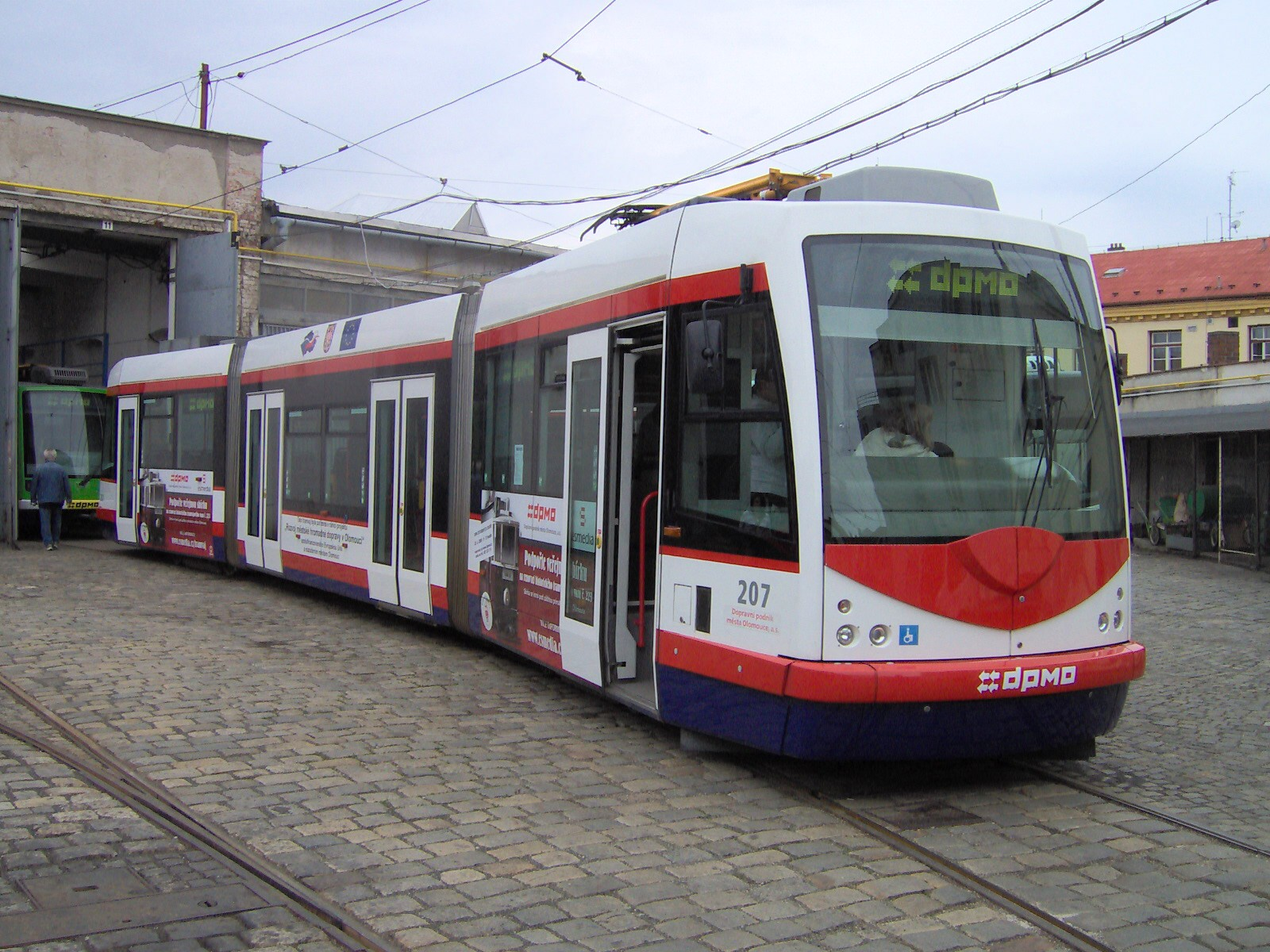
- Manufacturer: Inekon Trams
- Assembly: Ostrava, Czech Republic
- Constructed: 2002–2006
- Number built: 12
- Predecessor: Škoda 03 T
- Capacity: 41 (Seated); 99 (Standing)

Specifications
- Train length: 20,130 mm (66 ft 1/2 in)
- Width: 2,460 mm (8 ft 7/8 in)
- Height: 3,460 mm (11 ft 4 1/4 in)
- Floor height: 350 mm (13 3/4 in); 750 mm (29 1/2 in)
- Low-floor: 50%
- Articulated sections: 2 (3 body sections)
- Maximum speed: 70 km/h (43 mph)
- Weight: 26 t (28.7 short tons; 25.6 long tons)
- Steep gradient: 8%
- Power output: 360 kW (480 hp) (4 × 90 kW or 120 hp)
- Wheels driven: 100% (8/8)
- Bogies: fixed
- Track gauge: 1,435 mm (4 ft 8 1/2 in)

The Inekon 01 Trio is an articulated low-floor tram manufactured by company Inekon Trams. The company is a member of Inekon group. The tram is conceptually based on the Škoda 03 T developed by Škoda Transportation and Inekon Group.

== Design ==
The joint venture between Škoda and Inekon was dissolved in 2001, after which Škoda continued to sell the 03 T, while Inekon formed a new partnership with DPO (Dopravní podnik Ostrava, the city transport company of Ostrava), known as DPO Inekon, and in 2002 began selling a nearly identical version of the Astra, under the name Trio. The Trio is a three-carbody-section, four-axle (two-bogie) design, in which the low-floor area represents 50% of the entire vehicle floor area. The overall length is 20.13 metres (66.0 ft). The Inekon 01 Trio is a single-ended (uni-directional) version, buyers of which have included (as of 2008) the transport agencies in Olomouc and Ostrava. The first car was built in 2002, for Ostrava's tram system (DPO).

== Deliveries and operation ==
City	Year	Delivered	In operation	Numbers
Olomouc (Czech Republic)	2006	3	3	205–207
Ostrava (Czech Republic)	2002–2005	9	9	1251–1259
TOTAL		12	12	
