= List of tram systems by gauge and electrification =

The following is a list of tram/streetcar (including heritage trams/heritage streetcars), or light rail systems with their track length, track gauge, electrification system.

The majority of tram systems use 1,435 mm (4 ft 8 1/2 in) standard gauge. Standard gauge is used for most new systems (except in the former Soviet Union where Russian gauge is used), even in places where another gauge is used for heavy rail systems. Metre gauge is mainly present in some older systems in Central Europe.

The electrification system for older systems is generally 600 V DC while more recent systems use 750 V DC. Some old systems upgraded to 750 V in recent years (mostly in Germany) while some systems (e.g. Romania) downgraded the voltage to 600 V to use the second-hand vehicles coming from the upgraded German networks. Most systems draw power from overhead catenary wires, while some use APS and ACR systems or internal power sources such as battery or ultracapacitors. A few vintage systems are horse-drawn tram or cable car.

== Systems in operation ==
Note: Overhead line electrification unless specified differently. All systems use direct current

Country	Network	Route length	Gauge	Voltage	Notes
Algeria	Algiers tramway	23.2 km	1,435 mm (4 ft 8 1/2 in)	750 V	
Algeria	Constantine tramway	18.3 km	1,435 mm (4 ft 8 1/2 in)	750 V	
Algeria	Mostaganem Tramway	14.2 km	1,435 mm (4 ft 8 1/2 in)	750 V	
Algeria	Oran Tramway	18.7 km	1,435 mm (4 ft 8 1/2 in)	750 V	
Algeria	Ouargla tramway	9.7 km	1,435 mm (4 ft 8 1/2 in)	750 V	
Algeria	Sétif tramway	22.4 km	1,435 mm (4 ft 8 1/2 in)	750 V	
Algeria	Sidi Bel Abbès Tramway	13.7 km	1,435 mm (4 ft 8 1/2 in)	750 V	
Argentina	Premetro (Buenos Aires)	7.4 km	1,435 mm (4 ft 8 1/2 in)	750 V	
Argentina	Historic Tramway of Buenos Aires	2 km	1,435 mm (4 ft 8 1/2 in)	750 V	Heritage streetcar
Argentina	Metrotranvía Mendoza	12.5 km	1,435 mm (4 ft 8 1/2 in)	600 V	
Australia	Glenelg tram line	15 km	1,435 mm (4 ft 8 1/2 in)	600 V	Originally built as 1,600 mm (5 ft 3 in)
Australia	Trams in Ballarat	1.37 km	1,435 mm (4 ft 8 1/2 in)	600 V	Heritage streetcar
Australia	Trams in Bendigo		1,435 mm (4 ft 8 1/2 in)	600 V	Heritage streetcar
Australia	Light rail in Canberra	12 km	1,435 mm (4 ft 8 1/2 in)	750 V	
Australia	Light rail in Gold Coast	27 km	1,435 mm (4 ft 8 1/2 in)	750 V	
Australia	Trams in Melbourne	250 km	1,435 mm (4 ft 8 1/2 in)	600 V	Largest network in the world. Partially 1,600 mm (5 ft 3 in) until 1959
Australia	Light rail in Newcastle	2.7 km	1,435 mm (4 ft 8 1/2 in)	750 V, at stops and depot only (ACR), for charging Ultracapacitors	Standard gauge used on both original tramways (from 1887 to 1950) and light rail (opened in February 2019).
Australia	Light rail in Sydney	36.7 km	1,435 mm (4 ft 8 1/2 in)	750 V (partially on APS and ACR)	Standard gauge used on both original tramways (from 1879 to 1961) and light rail (opened in August 1997). Includes Parramatta Light Rail
Australia	Victor Harbor Horse Drawn Tram	3.1 km	1,600 mm (5 ft 3 in)	Horse-drawn	Heritage system reinstated in 1986
Austria	Gmunden Tramway	20.1 km	1,000 mm (3 ft 3 3/8 in)	600 V	Includes Traunseebahn interurban tram
Austria	Trams in Graz	67.2 km	1,435 mm (4 ft 8 1/2 in)	600 V	
Austria	Trams in Innsbruck	44.8 km	1,000 mm (3 ft 3 3/8 in)	900 V	Includes Stubai Valley Railway interurban tram
Austria	Trams in Linz	26.8 km	900 mm (2 ft 11 7/16 in)	600 V	
Austria	Pöstlingbergbahn	4.1 km	900 mm (2 ft 11 7/16 in)	600 V	Operated as a separate metre gauge line until regauging and integration with the Linz tramway in 2009
Austria	Trams in Vienna	180 km	1,435 mm (4 ft 8 1/2 in)	600 V	
Austria	Badner Bahn	30.4 km	1,435 mm (4 ft 8 1/2 in)	600 V	
Belarus	Mazyr tram	20.3 km	1,524 mm (5 ft)	600 V	
Belarus	Trams in Minsk	62.8 km	1,524 mm (5 ft)	600 V	Converted from metre gauge in 1929
Belarus	Trams in Navapolatsk	13.7 km	1,524 mm (5 ft)	550 V	
Belarus	Vitebsk tram	34.5 km	1,524 mm (5 ft)	600 V	
Belgium	Antwerp Tramway	83.7 km	1,000 mm (3 ft 3 3/8 in)	600 V	Includes Antwerp Pre-metro
Belgium	Trams in Brussels	147.9 km	1,435 mm (4 ft 8 1/2 in)	750 V	
Belgium	Trams in Liège	11.7 km	1,435 mm (4 ft 8 1/2 in)	750 V	Original network (1893–1968), restarted in 2025. Both as standard gauge.
Belgium	Métro Léger de Charleroi	33 km	1,000 mm (3 ft 3 3/8 in)	600 V	
Belgium	Coast Tram	68 km	1,000 mm (3 ft 3 3/8 in)	600 V	
Belgium	Trams in Ghent	30 km	1,000 mm (3 ft 3 3/8 in)	600 V	Metre gauge since 1904, converted from standard gauge (1874–1904)
Bolivia	Mi Tren	5,3 km	1,435 mm (4 ft 8 1/2 in)	750 V	
Bosnia and Herzegovina	Trams in Sarajevo	17.3 km	1,435 mm (4 ft 8 1/2 in)	600 V	1885–1960 at 760 mm (2 ft 5 15/16 in), converted to metre gauge in 1960
Brazil	Rio de Janeiro Light Rail	28 km	1,435 mm (4 ft 8 1/2 in)	750 V on APS and ultracapacitors	
Brazil	Baixada Santista Light Rail	11.5 km	1,435 mm (4 ft 8 1/2 in)		
Brazil	Salvador LRT	4 km	1,435 mm (4 ft 8 1/2 in)	750 V	
Brazil	Santa Teresa Tram	12.2 km	1,100 mm (3 ft 7 5/16 in)	600 V	Collect current with trolley pole.
Brazil	Santos tramways		1,350 mm (4 ft 5 5/32 in)		Closed 1971, heritage streetcar opened 2000
Bulgaria	Trams in Sofia	114 km	1,009 mm (3 ft 3 23/32 in)	600 V	
Bulgaria	Trams in Sofia	40 km	1,435 mm (4 ft 8 1/2 in)	600 V	
Canada	CTrain	59.9 km	1,435 mm (4 ft 8 1/2 in)	600 V	Street running in Downtown Calgary
Canada	Edmonton LRT	24.3 km	1,435 mm (4 ft 8 1/2 in)	600 V	Capital Line and Metro Line
Canada	Edmonton LRT	13.1 km	1,435 mm (4 ft 8 1/2 in)	750 V	Valley Line
Canada	Edmonton High Level Bridge Streetcar	3 km	1,435 mm (4 ft 8 1/2 in)		Heritage streetcar. Last part of Edmonton Radial Railway (1908–1951) (same gauge)
Canada	Nelson Electric Tramway	1.2 km	1,435 mm (4 ft 8 1/2 in)	600 V	Heritage streetcar
Canada	Ottawa Confederation Line 1	12.5 km	1,435 mm (4 ft 8 1/2 in)	1500 V	Ottawa Electric Railway (1891–1959) with the same gauge
Canada	Toronto streetcar system	83 km	4 ft 10 7/8 in (1,495 mm)	600 V	Collect current with trolley pole.
Canada	Toronto subway	29.3 km	1,435 mm (4 ft 8 1/2 in)	750 V	Line 5 Eglinton and Line 6 Finch West
Canada	Waterloo Ion Light Rail	19 km	1,435 mm (4 ft 8 1/2 in)	750 V	
China	Trams in Beijing	20.6 km	1,435 mm (4 ft 8 1/2 in)	750 V	Xijiao line and Yizhuang T1 line
China	Changchun Tram	12.8 km	1,435 mm (4 ft 8 1/2 in)	600 V	
China	Changchun Light rail	68 km	1,435 mm (4 ft 8 1/2 in)	750 V	Line 3, Line 4 and Line 8
China	Chengdu Tram	39.3 km	1,435 mm (4 ft 8 1/2 in)		
China	Chengdu Tram	18 km	Unclear		Anren tramway - Heritage tram Chengdu / Anren (Dayi County, Sichuan)
China	Dalian Tram	23.4 km	1,435 mm (4 ft 8 1/2 in)	550 V	
China	Gaoming Tram	6.5 km	1,435 mm (4 ft 8 1/2 in)	Fuel cells	Foshan Tram
China	Nanhai Tram	9.5 km	1,435 mm (4 ft 8 1/2 in)	750 V	Foshan Tram
China	Guangzhou Tram	24.9 km	1,435 mm (4 ft 8 1/2 in)	750 V, at stops only, for charging Ultracapacitors	The trams recharge their onboard energy storage units at stops
China	Huai'an Tram	20.1 km	1,435 mm (4 ft 8 1/2 in)	900 V, at stops only, for charging Ultracapacitors	The trams recharge their onboard energy storage units at stops
China	Jiaxing Tram	13.8 km	1,435 mm (4 ft 8 1/2 in)	??? V, at stops only, for charging Battery	The trams recharge their onboard energy storage units at stops
China	Nanjing Trams	17.2 km	1,435 mm (4 ft 8 1/2 in)	750 V, mostly at stops only, for charging Battery	The trams recharge their onboard energy storage units at stops
China	Qingdao Tram	8.8 km	1,435 mm (4 ft 8 1/2 in)	750 V	
China	Sanya Tram	8.37 km	1,435 mm (4 ft 8 1/2 in)	1500 V, at stops only, for charging Ultracapacitors	
China	Songjiang Tram	31 km	1,435 mm (4 ft 8 1/2 in)	750 V	Tram in Shanghai
China	Shenyang Tram	60 km	1,435 mm (4 ft 8 1/2 in)	750 V, Catenary and ultracapacitors	
China	Shenzhen Tram	11.7 km	1,435 mm (4 ft 8 1/2 in)	900 V, at stops only, for charging Ultracapacitors	
China	Suzhou Tram	46.1 km	1,435 mm (4 ft 8 1/2 in)	750 V	
China	Tianshui Tram	12.93 km	1,435 mm (4 ft 8 1/2 in)	battery	
China	Trams in Wuhan	53.2 km	1,435 mm (4 ft 8 1/2 in)	750-900 V, at stops only, for charging Ultracapacitors	The trams recharge their onboard energy storage units at stops
Hong Kong	Hong Kong Tramways	13 km	1,067 mm (3 ft 6 in)	550 V	Collect current with trolley pole.
Hong Kong	Hong Kong Light Rail	36.2 km	1,435 mm (4 ft 8 1/2 in)	750 V	
Colombia	Ayacucho Tram	4.3 km	Rubber-tyred tram	750 V	Translohr
Croatia	Trams in Osijek	12 km	1,000 mm (3 ft 3 3/8 in)	600 V	
Croatia	Trams in Zagreb	54.2 km	1,000 mm (3 ft 3 3/8 in)	600 V	1891–1911 at 760 mm (2 ft 5 15/16 in), converted to 1,000 mm (3 ft 3 3/8 in) in 1910
Czech Republic	Trams in Brno	70.4 km	1,435 mm (4 ft 8 1/2 in)	600 V	Negative polarity
Czech Republic	Trams in Liberec and Jablonec	21.5 km	1,435 mm (4 ft 8 1/2 in)	600 V	Includes Liberec–Jablonec interurban tram
Czech Republic	Trams in Most and Litvínov	18.6 km	1,435 mm (4 ft 8 1/2 in)	600 V	
Czech Republic	Trams in Olomouc	15 km	1,435 mm (4 ft 8 1/2 in)	600 V	
Czech Republic	Trams in Ostrava	62.7 km	1,435 mm (4 ft 8 1/2 in)	600 V	Negative polarity
Czech Republic	Trams in Plzeň	20.3 km	1,435 mm (4 ft 8 1/2 in)	600 V	
Czech Republic	Trams in Prague	150.3 km	1,435 mm (4 ft 8 1/2 in)	600 V	
Denmark	Aarhus Letbane	107 km	1,435 mm (4 ft 8 1/2 in)	750 V	
Denmark	Odense Letbane	14.4 km	1,435 mm (4 ft 8 1/2 in)	750 V	
Denmark	Greater Copenhagen Light Rail	27 km	1,435 mm (4 ft 8 1/2 in)	750 V	
Denmark	Skjoldenæsholm Tram Museum	1.8 km and 2.0 km	1,000 mm (3 ft 3 3/8 in) and 1,435 mm (4 ft 8 1/2 in)		
Ecuador	Cuenca Tramway	20.4 km	1,435 mm (4 ft 8 1/2 in)	750 V (partially on APS)	
Egypt	Trams in Alexandria	32 km	1,435 mm (4 ft 8 1/2 in)		Collect current with trolley pole.
Estonia	Trams in Tallinn	22.2 km	1,067 mm (3 ft 6 in)	600 V	
Ethiopia	Addis Ababa Light Rail	31.6 km	1,435 mm (4 ft 8 1/2 in)	750 V	
Finland	Trams in Helsinki	94 km	1,000 mm (3 ft 3 3/8 in)	750 V	600 V until 2025
Finland	Tampere light rail	24 km	1,435 mm (4 ft 8 1/2 in)	750 V	
France	Angers tramway	22.4 km	1,435 mm (4 ft 8 1/2 in)	750 V (partially on APS)	Originally metre gauge (1896–1949), restarted in 2011 as standard gauge
France	Aubagne tramway	2.8 km	1,435 mm (4 ft 8 1/2 in)	750 V	
France	Avignon tramway	5.2 km	1,435 mm (4 ft 8 1/2 in)	750 V	
France	Trams in Besançon	14.5 km	1,435 mm (4 ft 8 1/2 in)	750 V	Originally metre gauge (1897–1952), restarted in 2014 as standard gauge
France	Bordeaux tramway	82 km	1,435 mm (4 ft 8 1/2 in)	750 V (partially on APS)	Originally metre gauge (1880–1958), restarted in 2003 as standard gauge
France	Brest tramway	19.4 km	1,435 mm (4 ft 8 1/2 in)	750 V	Originally metre gauge (1898–1944), restarted in 2012 as standard gauge
France	Caen tramway	15.7 km	1,435 mm (4 ft 8 1/2 in)	750 V	Originally metre gauge (1860–1937). Guided bus in 2002–2017. Restarted in 2019 as standard gauge conventional tram
France	Dijon tramway	19 km	1,435 mm (4 ft 8 1/2 in)	750 V	Originally metre gauge (1895–1961), restarted in 2012 as standard gauge
France	Clermont-Ferrand tramway	15.7 km	Rubber-tyred tram	750 V	Translohr
France	Grenoble tramway	43.7 km	1,435 mm (4 ft 8 1/2 in)	750 V	Originally metre gauge (1894–1952), restarted in 1987 as standard gauge
France	Le Havre tramway	13 km	1,435 mm (4 ft 8 1/2 in)	750 V	Original network (1874–1951), restarted in 2012. Both as standard gauge
France	Le Mans tramway	18.8 km	1,435 mm (4 ft 8 1/2 in)	750 V	Originally metre gauge (1897–1947), restarted in 2007 as standard gauge
France	Lille tramway	17.5 km	1,000 mm (3 ft 3 3/8 in)	750 V	Continuously operating since 1874. Partially at standard gauge until 1907
France	Lyon tramway	106.5 km	1,435 mm (4 ft 8 1/2 in)	750 V	Originally both metre gauge and standard gauge (1880–1956), restarted in 2001 as standard gauge. Includes Rhônexpress
France	Marseille tramway	19.2 km	1,435 mm (4 ft 8 1/2 in)	750 V	Continuously operating since 1876 (2004-2007 closed for renovation works)
France	Montpellier tramway	71.6 km	1,435 mm (4 ft 8 1/2 in)	750 V	Originally metre gauge (1897–1949), restarted in 2000 as standard gauge
France	Mulhouse tramway	16.2 km	1,435 mm (4 ft 8 1/2 in)	750 V	Originally metre gauge (1882–1957), restarted in 2006 as standard gauge
France	Nantes tramway	43.5 km	1,435 mm (4 ft 8 1/2 in)	750 V	Original network (1879–1958), restarted in 1985. Both as standard gauge
France	Nice tramway	24.2 km	1,435 mm (4 ft 8 1/2 in)	750 V and battery	Original network (1878–1953), restarted in 2007. Both as standard gauge
France	Orléans tramway	29.3 km	1,435 mm (4 ft 8 1/2 in)	750 V (partially on APS)	Original network (1877–1938), restarted in 2000. Both as standard gauge
France	Tramways in Île-de-France	116.8 km	1,435 mm (4 ft 8 1/2 in)	750 V and 25 kV	Original network (1855–1938), restarted in 1992. Both as standard gauge
France	Tramways in Île-de-France	20.6 km	Rubber-tyred tram	750 V	Translohr, Line 5 and Line 6
France	Reims tramway	11.2 km	1,435 mm (4 ft 8 1/2 in)	750 V (partially on APS)	Originally metre gauge (1881–1939), restarted in 2011 as standard gauge
France	Rouen tramway	15.1 km	1,435 mm (4 ft 8 1/2 in)	750 V	Original network (1877–1953), restarted in 1994. Both as standard gauge
France	Saint-Étienne tramway	16 km	1,000 mm (3 ft 3 3/8 in)	600 V	Continuously operating since 1881
France	Strasbourg tramway	53.1 km	1,435 mm (4 ft 8 1/2 in)	750 V	Originally both metre gauge and standard gauge (1878–1960), restarted in 1994 as standard gauge
France	Toulouse tramway	16.7 km	1,435 mm (4 ft 8 1/2 in)	750 V	Original network (1862–1957), restarted in 2010.
France	Tours tramway	14.8 km	1,435 mm (4 ft 8 1/2 in)	750 V (partially on APS)	Originally metre gauge (1877–1949), restarted in 2013 as standard gauge
France	Valenciennes tramway	33.8 km	1,435 mm (4 ft 8 1/2 in)	750 V	Originally metre gauge (1881–1966), restarted in 2006 as standard gauge
Germany	Trams in Augsburg	45.4 km	1,000 mm (3 ft 3 3/8 in)		
Germany	Kirnitzschtal tramway	7.9 km	1,000 mm (3 ft 3 3/8 in)	600 V	
Germany	Trams in Berlin	196.3 km	1,435 mm (4 ft 8 1/2 in)	750 V	First network with electric trams (1881). 600 V until 2023
Germany	Bielefeld Stadtbahn	33.1 km	1,000 mm (3 ft 3 3/8 in)	750 V	600 V until 2011
Germany	Trams in Bochum/Gelsenkirchen	86.2 km	1,000 mm (3 ft 3 3/8 in)	600/750 V	
Germany	Bochum Stadtbahn	15 km	1,435 mm (4 ft 8 1/2 in)	750 V	
Germany	Trams in Bonn and Bonn Stadtbahn	125.4 km	1,435 mm (4 ft 8 1/2 in)	750 V	
Germany	Trams in Brandenburg an der Havel	17.6 km	1,000 mm (3 ft 3 3/8 in)	600 V	
Germany	Trams in Braunschweig	39.6 km	1,100 mm (3 ft 7 5/16 in)	600 V	
Germany	Trams in Bremen	114.6 km	1,435 mm (4 ft 8 1/2 in)	600 V	
Germany	Trams in Chemnitz	30.6 km	1,435 mm (4 ft 8 1/2 in)	600 V	Converted from 914 mm (3 ft) (1893-ca 1914) and 925 mm (3 ft 13/32 in) (ca 1914-1950s / 1988)
Germany	Cologne Stadtbahn	198 km	1,435 mm (4 ft 8 1/2 in)	750 V	Both lines between Cologne and Bonn were originally heavy load train lines electrified at 1,200 V. Line 18 once was metre gauge
Germany	Trams in Cottbus	20.1 km	1,000 mm (3 ft 3 3/8 in)	600 V	
Germany	Trams in Darmstadt	42 km	1,000 mm (3 ft 3 3/8 in)	600 V	
Germany	Dortmund Stadtbahn	75 km	1,435 mm (4 ft 8 1/2 in)	750 V	600 V until 1999
Germany	Trams in Dresden	134.3 km	1,450 mm (4 ft 9 3/32 in)	600 V	1,440 mm (4 ft 8 11/16 in) until 1903
Germany	Trams in Duisburg	43.7 km	1,435 mm (4 ft 8 1/2 in)	750 V	Partially on metre gauge until 1966
Germany	Trams in Düsseldorf	56.8 km	1,435 mm (4 ft 8 1/2 in)	600 V	
Germany	Düsseldorf Stadtbahn	98.6 km	1,435 mm (4 ft 8 1/2 in)	750 V	
Germany	Erfurt Stadtbahn	45.2 km	1,000 mm (3 ft 3 3/8 in)	750 V	600 V until 2014
Germany	Trams in Essen	52.5 km	1,000 mm (3 ft 3 3/8 in)	750 V	
Germany	Essen Stadtbahn	21.5 km	1,435 mm (4 ft 8 1/2 in)	750 V	
Germany	Trams in Frankfurt (Oder)	19.5 km	1,000 mm (3 ft 3 3/8 in)	600 V	
Germany	Trams in Frankfurt am Main	68.7 km	1,435 mm (4 ft 8 1/2 in)	600 V	In process of being converted to 750 V
Germany	Frankfurt U-Bahn	64.85 km	1,435 mm (4 ft 8 1/2 in)	600 V	In process of being converted to 750 V
Germany	Trams in Freiburg im Breisgau	34.7 km	1,000 mm (3 ft 3 3/8 in)	750 V	600 V until 1983
Germany	Trams in Gera	18.5 km	1,000 mm (3 ft 3 3/8 in)	600 V	
Germany	Trams in Görlitz	11.8 km	1,000 mm (3 ft 3 3/8 in)	600 V	
Germany	Trams in Gotha	25 km	1,000 mm (3 ft 3 3/8 in)	600 V	
Germany	Trams in Halberstadt	11.7 km	1,000 mm (3 ft 3 3/8 in)	600 V	
Germany	Trams in Halle	87.6 km	1,000 mm (3 ft 3 3/8 in)	750 V	
Germany	Hanover Stadtbahn	127 km	1,435 mm (4 ft 8 1/2 in)	600 V	
Germany	Trams in Heidelberg	25.1 km	1,000 mm (3 ft 3 3/8 in)	750 V	
Germany	Trams in Jena	23.26 km	1,000 mm (3 ft 3 3/8 in)	600 V	
Germany	Trams in Karlsruhe	71.5 km	1,435 mm (4 ft 8 1/2 in)	750 V	
Germany	Trams in Kassel	73.6 km	1,435 mm (4 ft 8 1/2 in)	600 V	
Germany	Trams in Krefeld	36.7 km	1,000 mm (3 ft 3 3/8 in)		
Germany	Trams in Leipzig	148.3 km	1,458 mm (4 ft 9 13/32 in)	600 V	
Germany	Trams in Magdeburg	64.1 km	1,435 mm (4 ft 8 1/2 in)	600 V	
Germany	Trams in Mainz	29.7 km	1,000 mm (3 ft 3 3/8 in)	750 V	600 V until 2018
Germany	Trams in Mannheim/Ludwigshafen	61 km	1,000 mm (3 ft 3 3/8 in)	750 V	600 V until 2006
Germany	Trams in Mülheim/Oberhausen	32 km	1,000 mm (3 ft 3 3/8 in)	750 V	
Germany	Trams in Munich	84.5 km	1,435 mm (4 ft 8 1/2 in)	750 V	600 V until 2001
Germany	Trams in Naumburg	2.9 km	1,000 mm (3 ft 3 3/8 in)	600 V	Heritage streetcar
Germany	Trams in Nordhausen	18 km	1,000 mm (3 ft 3 3/8 in)	600 V/diesel	
Germany	Trams in Nuremberg	33 km	1,435 mm (4 ft 8 1/2 in)	600 V	
Germany	Trams in Plauen	16.4 km	1,000 mm (3 ft 3 3/8 in)	600 V	
Germany	Trams in Potsdam	28.9 km	1,435 mm (4 ft 8 1/2 in)	750 V	600 V until 2015
Germany	Trams in Rostock	35.6 km	1,435 mm (4 ft 8 1/2 in)	750 V	600 V until 2017
Germany	Saarbahn	43.4 km	1,435 mm (4 ft 8 1/2 in)	750 V	
Germany	Schöneiche bei Berlin tramway	14.1 km	1,000 mm (3 ft 3 3/8 in)		
Germany	Trams in Schwerin	21 km	1,435 mm (4 ft 8 1/2 in)	600 V	
Germany	Strausberg Railway	6.2 km	1,435 mm (4 ft 8 1/2 in)	750 V	
Germany	Stuttgart Stadtbahn	131 km	1,435 mm (4 ft 8 1/2 in)	750 V	Originally metre gauge. Part of the network on dual gauge until 2007. Some parts still on dual gauge only for heritage rolling stocks
Germany	Trams in Ulm	19.1 km	1,000 mm (3 ft 3 3/8 in)	750 V	
Germany	Woltersdorf Tramway	5.6 km	1,435 mm (4 ft 8 1/2 in)	600 V	Heritage streetcar
Germany	Trams in Würzburg	19.7 km	1,000 mm (3 ft 3 3/8 in)	750 V	
Germany	Trams in Zwickau	20.2 km	1,000 mm (3 ft 3 3/8 in)	600 V	
Greece	Athens Tram	32.4 km	1,435 mm (4 ft 8 1/2 in)	750 V	Originally metre gauge (1882–1960), restarted in 2004 as standard gauge
Hungary	Trams in Budapest	149.0 km	1,435 mm (4 ft 8 1/2 in)	600 V	Opened in 1866. Anciently partially on metre gauge
Hungary	Trams in Debrecen	8.8 km	1,435 mm (4 ft 8 1/2 in)	600 V	
Hungary	Trams in Miskolc	12 km	1,435 mm (4 ft 8 1/2 in)	600 V	
Hungary	Trams in Szeged	17 km	1,435 mm (4 ft 8 1/2 in)	600 V	
India	Trams in Kolkata	28 km	1,435 mm (4 ft 8 1/2 in)	550 V	Collect current with trolley pole.
Ireland	Luas	42.1 km	1,435 mm (4 ft 8 1/2 in)	750 V	Closed 1949, new system opened 2004
Israel	Jerusalem Light Rail	22.5 km	1,435 mm (4 ft 8 1/2 in)	750 V	
Israel	Tel Aviv Light Rail	24 km	1,435 mm (4 ft 8 1/2 in)	1500 V	Red Line runs partially as a premetro
Italy	Bergamo–Albino light rail	12.5 km	1,435 mm (4 ft 8 1/2 in)	750 V	
Italy	Cagliari light rail	12 km	950 mm (3 ft 1 3/8 in)	750 V	Since 2008
Italy	Trams in Florence	16.5 km	1,435 mm (4 ft 8 1/2 in)	750 V	
Italy	Trams in Messina	7.7 km	1,435 mm (4 ft 8 1/2 in)	750 V	950 mm (3 ft 1 3/8 in) from 1917 to 1951, restarted as standard gauge in 2003
Italy	Trams in Milan	118 km	1,445 mm (4 ft 8 7/8 in)	550 V	
Italy	Trams in Naples	11.8 km	Unclear	750 V	600 V until 2001 (changed with the new fleet of AnsaldoBreda Sirio). Unclear if the gauge is 1,445 mm (4 ft 8 7/8 in) or standard gauge
Italy	Trams in Padua	10.3 km	Rubber-tyred tram	750 V	Translohr
Italy	Trams in Palermo	23.3 km	1,435 mm (4 ft 8 1/2 in)	750 V	Originally metre gauge (1878–1947), restarted in 2015 as standard gauge
Italy	Trams in Rome	36 km	1,445 mm (4 ft 8 7/8 in)	550 V	
Italy	Metrosassari	4.9 km	950 mm (3 ft 1 3/8 in)	750 V	
Italy	Rittnerbahn	6.6 km	1,000 mm (3 ft 3 3/8 in)	750 V	Opened 1907 passenger light railway, or rural tram
Italy	Trieste–Opicina tramway	5.2 km	1,000 mm (3 ft 3 3/8 in)	600 V	Opened 1902
Italy	Trams in Turin	88 km	1,445 mm (4 ft 8 7/8 in)	550 V	
Italy	Trams in Mestre	20 km	Rubber-tyred tram	750 V	Translohr since 2010; former, classic system 1907–1941
Japan	Chikuhō Electric Railroad Line	16 km	1,435 mm (4 ft 8 1/2 in)	600 V	
Japan	Hakodate City Tram	10.9 km	4 ft 6 in (1,372 mm)	600 V	
Japan	Hankai Tramway	19.6 km	1,435 mm (4 ft 8 1/2 in)	600 V	
Japan	Hiroshima Electric Railway	35.1 km	1,435 mm (4 ft 8 1/2 in)	600 V	
Japan	Kagoshima City Transportation Bureau	13.1 km	1,435 mm (4 ft 8 1/2 in)	600 V	
Japan	Tosaden Kōtsū	25.3 km	1,067 mm (3 ft 6 in)	600 V	
Japan	Kumamoto City Transportation Bureau	12.2 km	1,435 mm (4 ft 8 1/2 in)	600 V	
Japan	Iyotetsu Tram	9.2 km	1,067 mm (3 ft 6 in)	600 V	
Japan	Nagasaki Electric Tramway	11.5 km	1,435 mm (4 ft 8 1/2 in)	600 V	
Japan	Okayama Electric Tramway	4.7 km	1,067 mm (3 ft 6 in)	600 V	
Japan	Manyosen	12.8 km	1,067 mm (3 ft 6 in)	600 V	Man'yōsen Shinminatokō Line and Man'yōsen Takaoka Kidō Line
Japan	Sapporo Streetcar	8.9 km	1,067 mm (3 ft 6 in)	600 V	
Japan	Toden Arakawa Line	12.2 km	4 ft 6 in (1,372 mm)	600 V	
Japan	Setagaya Line	5 km	4 ft 6 in (1,372 mm)	600 V	
Japan	Toyama City Tram Line	7.3 km	1,067 mm (3 ft 6 in)	600 V	
Japan	Toyama Chihō Railway Toyamakō Line	7.6 km	1,067 mm (3 ft 6 in)	600 V	
Japan	Toyohashi Railroad	5.4 km	1,067 mm (3 ft 6 in)	600 V	
Japan	Utsunomiya Light Rail	14.6 km	1,067 mm (3 ft 6 in)	750 V	
Kazakhstan	Astana Light Metro	22.6 km	1,524 mm (5 ft)	600 V	
Kazakhstan	Ust-Kamenogorsk tram	33 km	1,524 mm (5 ft)	550 V	
Kazakhstan	Pavlodar tram	44.6 km	1,524 mm (5 ft)	550 V	
Kazakhstan	Temirtau tram		1,524 mm (5 ft)	550 V	
Latvia	Daugavpils Satiksme	27 km	1,524 mm (5 ft)		Collect current with trolley pole.
Latvia	Trams in Liepāja	15.8 km	1,000 mm (3 ft 3 3/8 in)	600 V	
Latvia	Trams in Riga	61 km	1,524 mm (5 ft)		Collect current with trolley pole.
Luxembourg	Trams in Luxembourg	16 km	1,435 mm (4 ft 8 1/2 in)	750 V	Standard gauge 1875-1908 and since 2017, metre gauge 1874–1964
Mauritius	Metro Express	30 km	1,435 mm (4 ft 8 1/2 in)	750 V	
Mexico	Sistema de Tren Eléctrico Urbano (Guadalajara)	46.4 km	1,435 mm (4 ft 8 1/2 in)	750 V	
Mexico	Mexico City Light Rail	13 km	1,435 mm (4 ft 8 1/2 in)		
Morocco	Casablanca Tramway	73.5 km	1,435 mm (4 ft 8 1/2 in)	750 V	
Morocco	Rabat–Salé tramway	19.5 km	1,435 mm (4 ft 8 1/2 in)	750 V	
Netherlands	Trams in Amsterdam	95 km	1,435 mm (4 ft 8 1/2 in)	600 V	1,422 mm / 4 ft 8 in until 1906
Netherlands	Trams in The Hague	105 km	1,435 mm (4 ft 8 1/2 in)	600 V	Connects with the trams in Rotterdam through Delft with RandstadRail service
Netherlands	Trams in Rotterdam	75 km	1,435 mm (4 ft 8 1/2 in)	600 V	Some parts originally 1,067 mm (3 ft 6 in) and metre gauge
Netherlands	Utrechtse sneltram	28.3 km	1,435 mm (4 ft 8 1/2 in)	750 V	
Netherlands; Aruba	Trams in Oranjestad	1.9 km	1,435 mm (4 ft 8 1/2 in)	Fuel cells and battery	Heritage streetcar
New Zealand	Trams in Auckland	1.2 km	1,435 mm (4 ft 8 1/2 in)		Currently a heritage streetcar. Original system 1902-1956 also used standard gauge.
New Zealand	Christchurch tramway system	1.5 km	1,435 mm (4 ft 8 1/2 in)	600 V	Heritage streetcar. Collect current with trolley pole.
North Korea	Trams in Chongjin	13 km	1,435 mm (4 ft 8 1/2 in)	600 V	
North Korea	Trams in Pyongyang	3.5 km	1,000 mm (3 ft 3 3/8 in)	600 V	Kŭmsusan Line only
North Korea	Trams in Pyongyang	50 km	1,435 mm (4 ft 8 1/2 in)	600 V	Line 1,2 and 3
Norway	Bergen Light Rail	28.4 km	1,435 mm (4 ft 8 1/2 in)	750 V	
Norway	Bergen Tramway	0.3 km	1,435 mm (4 ft 8 1/2 in)	600 V, 750 V on heritage trams.	1897–1964. Heritage tram since 1993
Norway	Trams in Oslo	36.9 km	1,435 mm (4 ft 8 1/2 in)	750 V	600 V until 2000
Norway	Trondheim Tramway	8.8 km	1,000 mm (3 ft 3 3/8 in)	600 V	
Poland	Trams in Bydgoszcz	29.1 km	1,000 mm (3 ft 3 3/8 in)	600 V	Horse-drawn 1888–1896, electric since 1896
Poland	Trams in Częstochowa	14.7 km	1,435 mm (4 ft 8 1/2 in)	600 V	Since 1959, negative polarity
Poland	Trams in Elbląg	16 km	1,000 mm (3 ft 3 3/8 in)	600 V	Since 1895, negative polarity
Poland	Trams in Gdańsk	58.1 km	1,435 mm (4 ft 8 1/2 in)	600 V	Horse-drawn 1873–1896, electric since 1896
Poland	Trams in Gorzów Wielkopolski	12.2 km	1,435 mm (4 ft 8 1/2 in)	600 V	Since 1899 (break 1922–1924), negative polarity
Poland	Trams in Grudziądz	9 km	1,000 mm (3 ft 3 3/8 in)	600 V	Horse-drawn 1896–1899, electric since 1899, negative polarity
Poland	Trams in Kraków	107.5 km	1,435 mm (4 ft 8 1/2 in)	600 V	Horse-drawn 1882–1901, electric (900 mm gauge) 1901–1953, electric standard gauge since 1913. Includes Kraków Fast Tram
Poland	Trams in Łódź	124.1 km	1,000 mm (3 ft 3 3/8 in)	600 V	Electric since 1898, steam-powered 1916–1927. Extensive suburban service. Negative polarity.
Poland	Horse Tram in Mrozy	1.75 km	900 mm (2 ft 11 7/16 in)	Horse-drawn	Horse-drawn 1902-1967 and since 2012
Poland	Trams in Olsztyn	11 km	1,435 mm (4 ft 8 1/2 in)	600 V	Originally metre gauge (1907–1965), restarted in 2015 as standard gauge
Poland	Trams in Poznań	65.6 km	1,435 mm (4 ft 8 1/2 in)	600 V	Horse-drawn 1880–1898, electric since 1898. Includes Poznań Fast Tram
Poland	Silesian Interurbans	181 km	1,435 mm (4 ft 8 1/2 in)	660 V	Steam-powered 1894–1901, horse-drawn 1895–1899, electric (785 mm gauge) 1898–1951, electric standard gauge since 1912
Poland	Trams in Szczecin	64 km	1,435 mm (4 ft 8 1/2 in)	600 V	Horse-drawn 1879–1898, electric since 1897
Poland	Trams in Toruń	22 km	1,000 mm (3 ft 3 3/8 in)	600 V	Horse-drawn 1891–1902, electric since 1899
Poland	Trams in Warsaw	150 km	1,435 mm (4 ft 8 1/2 in)	600 V	Horse-drawn 1866–1916, electric since 1908, diesel-powered (one route) in 1924. Converted from 1,524 mm (Russian gauge) in 1946–1950.
Poland	Trams in Wrocław	84 km	1,435 mm (4 ft 8 1/2 in)	600 V	Horse-drawn 1877–1906, electric since 1893
Portugal	Metro Transportes do Sul	13.5 km	1,435 mm (4 ft 8 1/2 in)	750 V	
Portugal	Trams in Lisbon	31 km	900 mm (2 ft 11 7/16 in)	600 V	Converted from standard gauge in 1888. Collect current with trolley pole and pantograph.
Portugal	Trams in Porto	8.9 km	1,435 mm (4 ft 8 1/2 in)	600 V	Heritage streetcar. Collect current with trolley pole.
Portugal	Porto Metro	67 km	1,435 mm (4 ft 8 1/2 in)	750 V	
Portugal	Trams in Sintra	11.5 km	1,000 mm (3 ft 3 3/8 in)		Heritage streetcar. Collect current with trolley pole.
Qatar	Msheireb Tram	2.12 km	1,435 mm (4 ft 8 1/2 in)	fuel cells	
Qatar	Education City tram	2.4 km	1,435 mm (4 ft 8 1/2 in)	Catenary at stops only, for charging Ultracapacitors	
Qatar	Lusail Tram	19 km	1,435 mm (4 ft 8 1/2 in)	750 V (partially on APS)	
Romania	Trams in Arad	48 km	1,000 mm (3 ft 3 3/8 in)	750 V	
Romania	Trams in Botoșani	7.4 km	1,435 mm (4 ft 8 1/2 in)	600 V	Voltage lowered from Romanian standard 750 V due to massive import of second hand German trams
Romania	Trams in Brăila	22.7 km	1,435 mm (4 ft 8 1/2 in)	600 V	
Romania	Bucharest Light rail	143 km	1,435 mm (4 ft 8 1/2 in)	750 V	
Romania	Trams in Cluj-Napoca	11.7 km	1,435 mm (4 ft 8 1/2 in)	750 V	
Romania	Trams in Craiova	16.7 km	1,435 mm (4 ft 8 1/2 in)	600 V	Voltage lowered from Romanian standard 750 V due to massive import of second hand German trams
Romania	Trams in Galați	20.4 km	1,435 mm (4 ft 8 1/2 in)	750 V	
Romania	CTP Iași	35 km	1,000 mm (3 ft 3 3/8 in)	600 V	825 V until 2005
Romania	Trams in Oradea	16.7 km	1,435 mm (4 ft 8 1/2 in)	600 V	
Romania	Trams in Ploiești	10.3 km	1,435 mm (4 ft 8 1/2 in)	750 V	
Romania	Trams in Reșița	10.3 km	1,435 mm (4 ft 8 1/2 in)	750 V	
Romania	Trams in Timișoara	37.5 km	1,435 mm (4 ft 8 1/2 in)	600 V	
Russia	Achinsk tram	26.5 km	1,524 mm (5 ft)		
Russia	Angarsk tram	34 km	1,524 mm (5 ft)	550 V	
Russia	Trams in Barnaul	125 km	1,524 mm (5 ft)		
Russia	Biysk tram	71 km	1,524 mm (5 ft)	600 V	
Russia	Chelyabinsk tram	68.7 km	1,524 mm (5 ft)		
Russia	Cherepovets tram		1,524 mm (5 ft)		
Russia	Cheryomushki tram	5.5 km	1,524 mm (5 ft)		
Russia	Trams in Irkutsk	23.4 km	1,524 mm (5 ft)	600 V	
Russia	Trams in Izhevsk	75.5 km	1,524 mm (5 ft)		
Russia	Trams in Kaliningrad	21.5 km	1,000 mm (3 ft 3 3/8 in)		
Russia	Kazan tram	120 km	1,524 mm (5 ft)	550 V	
Russia	Kemerovo tram	56.1 km	1,524 mm (5 ft)	550 V	
Russia	Trams in Khabarovsk	33.5 km	1,524 mm (5 ft)	660 V	
Russia	Kolomna tram	46 km	1,524 mm (5 ft)		
Russia	Krasnodar tram	123.6 km	1,524 mm (5 ft)		
Russia	Krasnoturyinsky tram	3.5 km	1,524 mm (5 ft)		
Russia	Trams in Krasnoyarsk	19 km	1,524 mm (5 ft)		
Russia	Kursk tram	40.4 km	1,524 mm (5 ft)	600 V	
Russia	Lipetsk tram	37 km	1,524 mm (5 ft)	600 V	
Russia	Magnitogorsk tram	76 km	1,524 mm (5 ft)	600 V	
Russia	Trams in Moscow	181 km	1,524 mm (5 ft)	550 V	
Russia	Naberezhnye Chelny tram	50.6 km	1,524 mm (5 ft)	550 V	
Russia	Nizhnekamsk tram	63.5 km	1,524 mm (5 ft)		
Russia	Trams in Nizhny Novgorod	98.5 km	1,524 mm (5 ft)	600 V	
Russia	Nizhny Tagil tram		1,524 mm (5 ft)		
Russia	Novocherkassk tram	43.5 km	1,524 mm (5 ft)		
Russia	Trams in Novokuznetsk	52.2 km	1,524 mm (5 ft)	600 V	
Russia	Trams in Novosibirsk	83 km	1,524 mm (5 ft)		
Russia	Novotroitsk tram	13 km	1,524 mm (5 ft)	550 V	
Russia	Omsk tram	60 km	1,524 mm (5 ft)	550 V	
Russia	Orsk tram	36 km	1,524 mm (5 ft)	600 V	
Russia	Oryol tram	38.9 km	1,524 mm (5 ft)	600 V	
Russia	Osinniki tram	18.6 km	1,524 mm (5 ft)	550 V	
Russia	Perm tram	110 km	1,524 mm (5 ft)		
Russia	Prokopyevsk tram	36.1 km	1,524 mm (5 ft)	550 V	
Russia	Pyatigorsk tram	47.8 km	1,000 mm (3 ft 3 3/8 in)		
Russia	Tram in Rostov-on-Don	67.2 km	1,435 mm (4 ft 8 1/2 in)	550 V	
Russia	Trams in Saint Petersburg	230 km	1,524 mm (5 ft)	550 V	
Russia	Salavat tram	26.7 km	1,524 mm (5 ft)	550 V	
Russia	Samara tram	69 km	1,524 mm (5 ft)		
Russia	Saratov tram	142 km	1,524 mm (5 ft)	550 V	
Russia	Smolensk tram	41.3 km	1,524 mm (5 ft)	550 V	
Russia	Stary Oskol tram	26.9 km	1,524 mm (5 ft)	550 V	
Russia	Taganrog tram	45 km	1,524 mm (5 ft)		
Russia	Tomsk tram	45.1 km	1,524 mm (5 ft)	550 V	
Russia	Tula tram	92.1 km	1,524 mm (5 ft)	550 V	
Russia	Trams in Ufa	97 km	1,524 mm (5 ft)		
Russia	Ulan-Ude tram	56.5 km	1,524 mm (5 ft)		
Russia	Ulyanovsk tram	130 km	1,524 mm (5 ft)		
Russia	Tram of Usolye-Sibirskoye	11.8 km	1,524 mm (5 ft)	550 V	
Russia	Ust-Katav tram	4 km	1,524 mm (5 ft)		
Russia	Vladikavkaz tram	46.5 km	1,524 mm (5 ft)		
Russia	Trams in Vladivostok	5.5 km	1,524 mm (5 ft)		
Russia	Trams in Volchansk	7.9 km	1,524 mm (5 ft)	550 V	
Russia	Volgograd tram	135 km	1,524 mm (5 ft)	550 V	
Russia	Volgograd Metrotram	17.3 km	1,524 mm (5 ft)	550 V	
Russia	Volzhsky tram		1,524 mm (5 ft)	550 V	
Russia	Yaroslavl tram	40.3 km	1,524 mm (5 ft)	600 V	
Russia	Yekaterinburg tram	80.6 km	1,524 mm (5 ft)		
Russia	Zlatoust tram	22.7 km	1,524 mm (5 ft)	550 V	
Serbia	Trams in Belgrade	43.5 km	1,000 mm (3 ft 3 3/8 in)	600 V	
Slovakia	Trams in Bratislava	45.4 km	1,000 mm (3 ft 3 3/8 in)	600 V	
Slovakia	Trams in Košice	33.7 km	1,435 mm (4 ft 8 1/2 in)	600 V	Negative polarity
Slovakia	Trams in Trenčianske Teplice	5.4 km	760 mm (2 ft 5 15/16 in)	600 V	
South Africa	Trams in Kimberley	1.4 km	1,067 mm (3 ft 6 in)	500 V	Heritage streetcar. Collect current with trolley pole.
Spain	Alicante Tram	110.7 km	1,000 mm (3 ft 3 3/8 in)	750 V (partially diesel)	
Spain	Cádiz Bay tram-train	24 km	1,668 mm (5 ft 5 21/32 in)	750 V	
Spain	Trams in Barcelona	30.4 km	1,435 mm (4 ft 8 1/2 in)	750 V	
Spain	Bilbao tram	5.6 km	1,000 mm (3 ft 3 3/8 in)	750 V	
Spain	Granada Metro	15.9 km	1,435 mm (4 ft 8 1/2 in)	750 V	
Spain	Jaén Tram	4.7 km	1,435 mm (4 ft 8 1/2 in)	750 V	
Spain	Metro Ligero	27.8 km	1,435 mm (4 ft 8 1/2 in)	750 V	
Spain	Málaga Metro	13.2 km	1,435 mm (4 ft 8 1/2 in)	750 V	
Spain	Murcia tram	17.5 km	1,435 mm (4 ft 8 1/2 in)	750 V	
Spain	Parla Tram	8.3 km	1,435 mm (4 ft 8 1/2 in)	750 V	
Spain	MetroCentro	3.5 km	1,435 mm (4 ft 8 1/2 in)	ACR	
Spain	Seville Metro	18 km	1,435 mm (4 ft 8 1/2 in)	750 V	
Spain	Tranvía de Sóller	4.9 km	914 mm (3 ft)	600 V	Heritage streetcar
Spain	Tenerife Tram	15.1 km	1,435 mm (4 ft 8 1/2 in)	750 V	
Spain	Metrovalencia	21.7 km	1,000 mm (3 ft 3 3/8 in)	750 V	Lines 4, 6 and 8 only
Spain	Vitoria-Gasteiz tram	7.8 km	1,000 mm (3 ft 3 3/8 in)	750 V	
Spain	Zaragoza tram	12.8 km	1,435 mm (4 ft 8 1/2 in)	750 V and ACR	Originally metre gauge (1885–1976), restarted in 2011 as standard gauge
Sweden	Gothenburg tram	95 km	1,435 mm (4 ft 8 1/2 in)	750 V	
Sweden	Trams in Malmö	2 km	1,435 mm (4 ft 8 1/2 in)		Heritage streetcar
Sweden	Lund tramway	5.5 km	1,435 mm (4 ft 8 1/2 in)	750 V	
Sweden	Trams in Norrköping	18.7 km	1,435 mm (4 ft 8 1/2 in)	750 V	
Sweden	Trams in Stockholm	38 km	1,435 mm (4 ft 8 1/2 in)	750 V	
Switzerland	Trams in Basel	46.6 km	1,000 mm (3 ft 3 3/8 in)	600 V	
Switzerland	Trams in Bern	33.4 km	1,000 mm (3 ft 3 3/8 in)	600 V	
Switzerland	Trams in Geneva	36 km	1,000 mm (3 ft 3 3/8 in)	600 V	
Switzerland	Lausanne light rail	7.8 km	1,435 mm (4 ft 8 1/2 in)	750 V	
Switzerland	Trams in Neuchâtel	8.8 km	1,000 mm (3 ft 3 3/8 in)	600 V	
Switzerland	Riffelalp tram	0.675 km	800 mm (2 ft 7 1/2 in)	Battery, previously 550V AC	1899-1960 and since 2001. Battery 80 V / 400 Ah
Switzerland	Trams in Zürich	77 km	1,000 mm (3 ft 3 3/8 in)	600 V	Includes Stadtbahn Glattal interurban tram and Limmattalbahn portion at 600 V. Converted from standard gauge, 1890?
Switzerland	Trams in Zürich	9.2 km	1,000 mm (3 ft 3 3/8 in)	1200 V	Limmattalbahn portion at 1200 V
Taiwan	Danhai light rail	7.3 km	1,435 mm (4 ft 8 1/2 in)	750 V	
Taiwan	Circular light rail	22.1 km	1,435 mm (4 ft 8 1/2 in)	ACR	
Tunisia	Tunis Light Rail	45.2 km	1,435 mm (4 ft 8 1/2 in)	750 V	
Turkey	Trams in Antalya	30.1 km	1,435 mm (4 ft 8 1/2 in)	750 V	
Turkey	Trams in Bursa	14.1 km	1,435 mm (4 ft 8 1/2 in)	750 V	
Turkey	Bursa heritage tramway	2.2 km	1,000 mm (3 ft 3 3/8 in)	750 V	
Turkey	EsTram	57.6 km	1,000 mm (3 ft 3 3/8 in)	750 V	
Turkey	Gaziantep Tram	22 km	1,435 mm (4 ft 8 1/2 in)	750 V	
Turkey	Istanbul nostalgic tramways	4.2 km	1,000 mm (3 ft 3 3/8 in)	750 V	Heritage streetcar
Turkey	Istanbul Tram	42.6 km	1,435 mm (4 ft 8 1/2 in)	750 V (partially on APS)	T5 Line uses APS
Turkey	Tram İzmir	32.6 km	1,435 mm (4 ft 8 1/2 in)	750 V	
Turkey	Akçaray	16.2 km	1,435 mm (4 ft 8 1/2 in)	750 V	
Turkey	Kayseray	17.8 km	1,435 mm (4 ft 8 1/2 in)	750 V	
Turkey	Konya Tram	41 km	1,435 mm (4 ft 8 1/2 in)	750 V	
Turkey	Samsun Tram	36 km	1,435 mm (4 ft 8 1/2 in)	750 V	
Ukraine	Trams in Dnipro	88 km	1,524 mm (5 ft)	600 V	
Ukraine	Trams in Donetsk	129.5 km	1,524 mm (5 ft)	600 V	
Ukraine	Trams in Druzhkivka	26.4 km	1,524 mm (5 ft)	600 V	
Ukraine	Trams in Horlivka	56.7 km	1,524 mm (5 ft)	600 V	
Ukraine	Trams in Kamianske	77.6 km	1,524 mm (5 ft)	600 V	
Ukraine	Trams in Kharkiv	217.6 km	1,524 mm (5 ft)	600 V	
Ukraine	Kyiv Light Rail	21 km	1,524 mm (5 ft)	600 V	
Ukraine	Trams in Kyiv	230.2 km	1,524 mm (5 ft)	600 V	
Ukraine	Trams in Konotop	28 km	1,524 mm (5 ft)	600 V	
Ukraine	Trams in Kryvyi Rih	88.1 km	1,524 mm (5 ft)	600 V	
Ukraine	Trams in Lviv	78.4 km	1,000 mm (3 ft 3 3/8 in)	600 V	Horse-drawn 1880–1908, electric since 1894
Ukraine	Trams in Mariupol	100.3 km	1,524 mm (5 ft)	600 V	
Ukraine	Trams in Mykolaiv	48.2 km	1,524 mm (5 ft)	600 V	
Ukraine	Trams in Odesa	197.3 km	1,524 mm (5 ft)	600 V	
Ukraine	Trams in Vinnytsia	21.2 km	1,000 mm (3 ft 3 3/8 in)	600 V	Since 1913
Ukraine	Trams in Yenakiieve	32.7 km	1,524 mm (5 ft)	600 V	
Ukraine	Trams in Yevpatoria	20 km	1,000 mm (3 ft 3 3/8 in)	600 V	Since 1914
Ukraine	Zaporizhzhia Tram	99.3 km	1,524 mm (5 ft)	600 V	
Ukraine	Trams in Zhytomyr	17.5 km	1,000 mm (3 ft 3 3/8 in)	600 V	Horse-drawn freight service since 1897, electric passenger service since 1899
United Arab Emirates	Dubai Tram	9.5 km	1,435 mm (4 ft 8 1/2 in)	750 V on APS	
United Kingdom	Blackpool Tramway	17.7 km	1,435 mm (4 ft 8 1/2 in)	600 V	550 V until 2011
United Kingdom	Edinburgh Trams	18.5 km	1,435 mm (4 ft 8 1/2 in)	750 V	
United Kingdom	Great Orme Tramway	1.5 km	1,067 mm (3 ft 6 in)	Cable car	Only remaining cable-operated street tramway in UK, and one of only a few surviving in the world
United Kingdom	Tramlink	28 km	1,435 mm (4 ft 8 1/2 in)	750 V	Some street running in Croydon
United Kingdom	Manchester Metrolink	100 km	1,435 mm (4 ft 8 1/2 in)	750 V	
United Kingdom	Nottingham Express Transit	32 km	1,435 mm (4 ft 8 1/2 in)	750 V	
United Kingdom	Seaton Tramway	4.8 km	2 ft 9 in (838 mm)	120 V	Since 1970 Heritage streetcar. Collect current with trolley pole.
United Kingdom	South Yorkshire Supertram	34.6 km	1,435 mm (4 ft 8 1/2 in)	750 V	Part of the route operates as a Tram-train
United Kingdom	Telford steam tram		2 ft (610 mm)	Steam	
United Kingdom	Volk's Electric Railway	1.6 km	2 ft 8 1/2 in (825 mm)	110 V third rail	
United Kingdom	West Midlands Metro	24 km	1,435 mm (4 ft 8 1/2 in)	750 V	
United Kingdom	Wirral Tramway	1.1 km	1,435 mm (4 ft 8 1/2 in)	550 V	Heritage streetcar. Collect current with trolley pole.
Isle of Man	Douglas Bay Horse Tramway	2.6 km	914 mm (3 ft)	Horse-drawn	Heritage horse tram
Isle of Man	Manx Electric Railway	27 km	914 mm (3 ft)	550 V	Heritage streetcar. Collect current with trolley pole.
Isle of Man	Snaefell Mountain Railway	8 km	1,067 mm (3 ft 6 in)	550 V	Heritage streetcar. Collect current with Bow collector, The third rail is for the Fell Brake and does not carry any power
USA	Atlanta Streetcar	4.3 km	1,435 mm (4 ft 8 1/2 in)	750 V	
USA	Baltimore Light Rail	48.3 km	1,435 mm (4 ft 8 1/2 in)	750 V	Baltimore Streetcar System used 1,638 mm (5 ft 4 1/2 in) until its closure. Gauge now used only in the Baltimore Streetcar Museum.
USA	Boston Green Line	43 km	1,435 mm (4 ft 8 1/2 in)	600 V	
USA	Boston Mattapan Trolley	4.1 km	1,435 mm (4 ft 8 1/2 in)	600 V	PCC streetcars. Collect current with trolley pole.
USA	Buffalo Metro Rail	10.3 km	1,435 mm (4 ft 8 1/2 in)	650 V	
USA	Camden-Trenton River line (New Jersey)	55 km	1,435 mm (4 ft 8 1/2 in)	Diesel	
USA	Charlotte, CityLynx Gold Line	6.4 km	1,435 mm (4 ft 8 1/2 in)	750 V	
USA	Charlotte, Lynx Blue Line	31.1 km	1,435 mm (4 ft 8 1/2 in)	750 V	
USA	Cincinnati Streetcar	5.8 km	1,435 mm (4 ft 8 1/2 in)	750 V	Originally 1,588 mm (5 ft 2 1/2 in) (1859–1951) former system operated by Cincinnati Street Railway, restarted in 2016 standard gauge
USA	Cleveland, Blue Line, Green Line, and Waterfront Line	24.6 km	1,435 mm (4 ft 8 1/2 in)	600 V	
USA	DART rail	150 km	1,435 mm (4 ft 8 1/2 in)	750 V	
USA	Dallas Streetcar	3.9 km	1,435 mm (4 ft 8 1/2 in)	750 V	
USA	M-Line Trolley, Dallas	7.4 km	1,435 mm (4 ft 8 1/2 in)	600 V	Heritage streetcar. Collect current with trolley pole.
USA	Denver RTD Light Rail, C Line (RTD), D, E, F, H, L, R, W	93.6 km	1,435 mm (4 ft 8 1/2 in)	750 V	Originally 1,067 mm (3 ft 6 in) (?), restarted in 1994 as standard gauge. Some street running
USA	Streetcar in Detroit	5.3 km	1,435 mm (4 ft 8 1/2 in)	750 V and battery	
USA	El Paso Streetcar	7.7 km	1,435 mm (4 ft 8 1/2 in)	650 V	
USA	Galveston Island Trolley	10.9 km	1,435 mm (4 ft 8 1/2 in)	Diesel	
USA	Houston Light Rail	24.5 km	1,435 mm (4 ft 8 1/2 in)	600/750 V	
USA	Hudson–Bergen Light Rail	27.4 km	1,435 mm (4 ft 8 1/2 in)	750 V	
USA	Kansas City Streetcar	9.2 km	1,435 mm (4 ft 8 1/2 in)	750 V	
USA	Streetcars in Kenosha, Wisconsin	2.7 km	1,435 mm (4 ft 8 1/2 in)	600 V	Heritage streetcar. Collect current with trolley pole.
USA	Streetcar in Little Rock	5.5 km	1,435 mm (4 ft 8 1/2 in)	600 V	Heritage streetcar. Collect current with trolley pole.
USA	Los Angeles Light Rail	157.8 km	1,435 mm (4 ft 8 1/2 in)	750 V	Only A, C, E, and K Lines
USA	Streetcar in Memphis	10.1 km	1,435 mm (4 ft 8 1/2 in)	600 V	Heritage streetcar
USA	Milwaukee Streetcar	4 km	1,435 mm (4 ft 8 1/2 in)	750 V	
USA	Minneapolis-Saint Paul Light Rail	35.1 km	1,435 mm (4 ft 8 1/2 in)	750 V	
USA	Newark Light Rail	10 km	1,435 mm (4 ft 8 1/2 in)	750 V	
USA	New Orleans Streetcar	35.9 km	1,588 mm (5 ft 2 1/2 in)	600 V	Collect current with trolley pole.
USA	Norfolk Light Rail	11.9 km	1,435 mm (4 ft 8 1/2 in)	750 V	
USA	Oklahoma City Streetcar	7.7 km	1,435 mm (4 ft 8 1/2 in)	740 V and battery	
USA	Philadelphia Light Rail, D, T and Philadelphia Streetcars, G	72.3 km	1,581 mm (5 ft 2 1/4 in)	600 V	SEPTA Subway–Surface Trolley Lines, Media–Sharon Hill Line and Route 15. Collect current with trolley pole except Media-Sharon Hill.
USA	Phoenix Light Rail	62 km	1,435 mm (4 ft 8 1/2 in)	750 V	
USA	Pittsburgh Light Rail	42.2 km	1,588 mm (5 ft 2 1/2 in)	650 V	Pittsburgh Railways (1902–1964) use the same track gauge and partially the same route
USA	Portland Light Rail	96.6 km	1,435 mm (4 ft 8 1/2 in)	750/825 V	Sections west of NE 9th Avenue & Holladay Street utilize a 750 V system
USA	Portland Streetcar	11.6 km	1,435 mm (4 ft 8 1/2 in)	750 V	
USA	Sacramento, SacRT light rail	69 km	1,435 mm (4 ft 8 1/2 in)	750 V	
USA	St. Louis MetroLink	82.4 km	1,435 mm (4 ft 8 1/2 in)	750 V	
USA	St. Louis Loop Trolley	3.5 km	1,435 mm (4 ft 8 1/2 in)	600 V	Heritage streetcar
USA	Salt Lake City Light Rail	72.1 km	1,435 mm (4 ft 8 1/2 in)	750 V	
USA	Salt Lake City Streetcar	3.2 km	1,435 mm (4 ft 8 1/2 in)		
USA	San Diego Trolley	103.8 km	1,435 mm (4 ft 8 1/2 in)	600 V	Oldest "second-generation" light rail system in the United States
USA	San Francisco cable car system	8.3 km	1,067 mm (3 ft 6 in)	Cable car	Part of San Francisco Municipal Railway
USA	San Francisco Muni Metro	62.6 km	1,435 mm (4 ft 8 1/2 in)	600 V	Part of San Francisco Municipal Railway
USA	San Francisco, E Embarcadero and F Market & Wharves	9.7 km	1,435 mm (4 ft 8 1/2 in)	600 V	Heritage streetcar, part of San Francisco Municipal Railway. Collect current with trolley pole.
USA	San Jose, VTA light rail	67.9 km	1,435 mm (4 ft 8 1/2 in)	750 V	
USA	Seattle Link Light rail	100.2 km	1,435 mm (4 ft 8 1/2 in)	1500 V	1 Line and 2 Line
USA	Seattle Link Light rail	6,4 km	1,435 mm (4 ft 8 1/2 in)	750 V	T Line. Originally 1,067 mm (3 ft 6 in) until 1938, restarted in 2003 as standard gauge
USA	Seattle Streetcar	6.1 km	1,435 mm (4 ft 8 1/2 in)	750 V	
USA	TECO Line Streetcar	4.3 km	1,435 mm (4 ft 8 1/2 in)	600 V	Heritage streetcar. Collect current with trolley pole.
USA	Tucson Streetcar	6.3 km	1,435 mm (4 ft 8 1/2 in)	750 V	
Uzbekistan	Trams in Samarkand	11.7 km	1,524 mm (5 ft)		

== Track gauge of defunct systems ==
=== Narrow gauge ===
Gauge	Country	Network	Comment
381 mm (15 in)	United Kingdom	Claude Lane at Rhyl	1952–1956
610 mm (2 ft)	Puerto Rico	Trams in Mayagüez	Horse-drawn 1895–1912
610 mm (2 ft)	United Kingdom	Claude Lane at Eastbourne	1956–1969
610 mm (2 ft)	United Kingdom	Fairbourne Railway	Horse-drawn 1895–1916
610 mm (2 ft)	United Kingdom	Harlech Tramway	Horse-drawn c.1878–c.1886
750 mm (2 ft 5 1/2 in)	Puerto Rico	Tranvía de la Capital a Río Piedras	1880–1900
760 mm (2 ft 5 15/16 in)	Austria	Ybbs tram	1907–1953
760 mm (2 ft 5 15/16 in)	Croatia	Trams in Dubrovnik	1910–1970
762 mm (2 ft 6 in)	United Kingdom	Alford and Sutton Tramway	Steam Tramway 1884–1889
762 mm (2 ft 6 in)	United Kingdom	Pwllheli Corporation Tramways	Horse-drawn 1899–1919
914 mm (3 ft)	Canada	Whitehorse Waterfront Trolley	2000-2017 Heritage tram The former track was part of the White Pass and Yukon Route
914 mm (3 ft)	Isle of Man	Upper Douglas Cable Tramway	Cable tramway 1896–1929
914 mm (3 ft)	United Kingdom	Portstewart Tramway	Steam tram 1882–1926
914 mm (3 ft)	United Kingdom	Rye and Camber Tramway	1895-1939
914 mm (3 ft)	United Kingdom	Wrexham and District Tramway	1876-1901
950 mm (3 ft 1 3/8 in)	Italy	Trams in Pescara	1934–1963
1,000 mm (3 ft 3 3/8 in)	Belgium	Vicinal tramway	1884–1991
1,000 mm (3 ft 3 3/8 in)	Croatia	Trams in Opatija	1908–1933
1,000 mm (3 ft 3 3/8 in)	Croatia	Trams in Pula	1904–1934
1,000 mm (3 ft 3 3/8 in)	Croatia	Trams in Rijeka	1899–1952
1,000 mm (3 ft 3 3/8 in)	Egypt	Trams in Cairo	1896–2019
1,000 mm (3 ft 3 3/8 in)	Finland	Trams in Turku	Originally standard gauge (1890–1892), rebuilt to metre gauge (1908–1972)
1,000 mm (3 ft 3 3/8 in)	Finland and Russia	Trams in Vyborg	1912-1957 Note: Vyborg was part of Finland until 1940, then became part of the Soviet Union.
1,000 mm (3 ft 3 3/8 in)	France	Blois Tramway	1910–1933
1,000 mm (3 ft 3 3/8 in)	France	Colmar Tramway	1902–1960
1,000 mm (3 ft 3 3/8 in)	France	Tramway of Puy-en-Velay	1896–1914
1,000 mm (3 ft 3 3/8 in)	France	Lourdes Tramway	1899–1930
1,000 mm (3 ft 3 3/8 in)	France	Pau Tramway	1894–1931
1,000 mm (3 ft 3 3/8 in)	France	Perpignan Tramway	1900–1955
1,000 mm (3 ft 3 3/8 in)	France	Poitiers Tramway	1899–1946
1,000 mm (3 ft 3 3/8 in)	France	Sète tramway	1901–1933
1,000 mm (3 ft 3 3/8 in)	Germany	Trams in Aachen	1880–1974
1,000 mm (3 ft 3 3/8 in)	Germany	Altenburg tram	1895–1920
1,000 mm (3 ft 3 3/8 in)	Germany	Bamberg tram	1897–1922
1,000 mm (3 ft 3 3/8 in)	Germany	Detmold tram	1900–1954
1,000 mm (3 ft 3 3/8 in)	Germany	Guben tram	1904-1938
1,000 mm (3 ft 3 3/8 in)	Germany	Hamm tram	1898–1961
1,000 mm (3 ft 3 3/8 in)	Germany	Hof tram	1901–1922
1,000 mm (3 ft 3 3/8 in)	Germany	Jüterbog tram	1897–1928
1,000 mm (3 ft 3 3/8 in)	Germany	Koblenz tram	1887–1967
1,000 mm (3 ft 3 3/8 in)	Germany	Landshut tram	1902–1945
1,000 mm (3 ft 3 3/8 in)	Germany	Lockwitztal Tramway	1906–1977
1,000 mm (3 ft 3 3/8 in)	Germany	Marburg tram	1903–1951
1,000 mm (3 ft 3 3/8 in)	Germany	Mühlhausen tram	1898–1969
1,000 mm (3 ft 3 3/8 in)	Germany	Trams in Münster	1901–1954
1,000 mm (3 ft 3 3/8 in)	Germany	Trams in Osnabrück	1906–1960
1,000 mm (3 ft 3 3/8 in)	Germany	Trams in Paderborn	1900–1963
1,000 mm (3 ft 3 3/8 in)	Germany	Pforzheim tram	1911–1964
1,000 mm (3 ft 3 3/8 in)	Germany	Pirmasens tram	1905–1943
1,000 mm (3 ft 3 3/8 in)	Germany	Regensburg tram	1903–1964
1,000 mm (3 ft 3 3/8 in)	Germany	Riesa tram	1889–1924
1,000 mm (3 ft 3 3/8 in)	Germany	Schweinfurt tram	1895–1921
1,000 mm (3 ft 3 3/8 in)	Germany	Solingen tram	1897–1959
1,000 mm (3 ft 3 3/8 in)	Germany	Stendal tram	1892–1926
1,000 mm (3 ft 3 3/8 in)	Germany	Stralsund tram	1900–1966
1,000 mm (3 ft 3 3/8 in)	Germany	Trams in Sylt	1888–1970
1,000 mm (3 ft 3 3/8 in)	Germany	Trams in Warnemünde	1910–1945
1,000 mm (3 ft 3 3/8 in)	Germany	Weimar tram	1899–1937
1,000 mm (3 ft 3 3/8 in)	Germany	Werder tram	1895–1926
1,000 mm (3 ft 3 3/8 in)	Germany	Wittenberg tram	1888–1921
1,000 mm (3 ft 3 3/8 in)	Germany	Worms tram	1906–1956
1,000 mm (3 ft 3 3/8 in)	Germany	Zerbst tram	1891–1928
1,000 mm (3 ft 3 3/8 in)	Italy	Tram network of Bari	1910–1948
1,000 mm (3 ft 3 3/8 in)	Italy	Tram network of Bergamo	1884–1958
1,000 mm (3 ft 3 3/8 in)	Italy	Bolzano tram network	1909–1948
1,000 mm (3 ft 3 3/8 in)	Italy	Tram network of Catania	1905–1951
1,000 mm (3 ft 3 3/8 in)	Italy	Civitanova Electric Tramway	1911–1955
1,000 mm (3 ft 3 3/8 in)	Italy	Como Tram Network	1906–1952
1,000 mm (3 ft 3 3/8 in)	Italy	Ferrara Tram Network	1903–1938
1,000 mm (3 ft 3 3/8 in)	Italy	Tram network of Genoa	1878–1966
1,000 mm (3 ft 3 3/8 in)	Italy	Gorizia tram network	1909–1935
1,000 mm (3 ft 3 3/8 in)	Italy	Tram network of Merano	1908–1956
1,000 mm (3 ft 3 3/8 in)	Italy	Modena tram network	1881–1950
1,000 mm (3 ft 3 3/8 in)	Italy	Tramway network of Padua (1883-1954)	1883–1954
1,000 mm (3 ft 3 3/8 in)	Italy	Trams in Perugia	1899–1946
1,000 mm (3 ft 3 3/8 in)	Italy	Pisa Tram Network	1912–1952
1,000 mm (3 ft 3 3/8 in)	Italy	Reggio Calabria Tramway	1918–1937
1,000 mm (3 ft 3 3/8 in)	Italy	Savona-Vado Ligure Tramway	1912–1948
1,000 mm (3 ft 3 3/8 in)	Italy	Sulmona Tramway	1908–1943
1,000 mm (3 ft 3 3/8 in)	Italy	Taranto Tram Network	1922–1950
1,000 mm (3 ft 3 3/8 in)	Italy	Trapani Tramway	1915–1951
1,000 mm (3 ft 3 3/8 in)	Italy	Treviso Tram Network	1910–1938
1,000 mm (3 ft 3 3/8 in)	Italy	Udine tram network	1887–1952
1,000 mm (3 ft 3 3/8 in)	Latvia	Tram traffic in Kemeros(Kemeri)	1912–1935
1,000 mm (3 ft 3 3/8 in)	Lithuania	Klaipeda tram	1904-1929 and 1950–1967
1,000 mm (3 ft 3 3/8 in)	Lithuania	Vilnius tram	Horse-drawn 1893–1916, diesel-powered 1924-1926
1,000 mm (3 ft 3 3/8 in)	Luxembourg	Esch-sur-Alzette Tramway	1927–1956
1,000 mm (3 ft 3 3/8 in)	Moldova	Trams in Chișinău	1888–1961
1,000 mm (3 ft 3 3/8 in)	Monaco	Monaco Tramway	1898–1931
1,000 mm (3 ft 3 3/8 in)	Netherlands	Trams in Groningen	1880–1949
1,000 mm (3 ft 3 3/8 in)	Netherlands	Trams in Haarlem	1899–1957
1,000 mm (3 ft 3 3/8 in)	Poland	Trams in Białystok	Horse-drawn 1895-1915
1,000 mm (3 ft 3 3/8 in)	Poland	Trams in Bielsko-Biała	1895-1971
1,000 mm (3 ft 3 3/8 in)	Poland	Trams in Cieszyn	1911-1921
1,000 mm (3 ft 3 3/8 in)	Poland	Trams in Inowrocław	1912-1962
1,000 mm (3 ft 3 3/8 in)	Poland	Trams in Jelenia Góra	Gas-powered standard gauge 1897–1899, electric metre gauge 1900-1969
1,000 mm (3 ft 3 3/8 in)	Poland	Trams in Kostrzyn nad Odrą	Horse-drawn 1903–1923, electric 1925-1945
1,000 mm (3 ft 3 3/8 in)	Poland	Trams in Legnica	1898-1969
1,000 mm (3 ft 3 3/8 in)	Poland	Trams in Słubice	1898-1945 (until 1945 as part of trams in Frankfurt (Oder) network)
1,000 mm (3 ft 3 3/8 in)	Poland	Trams in Słupsk	1910-1959
1,000 mm (3 ft 3 3/8 in)	Poland	Trams in Sulejówek	Horse-drawn 1898-1914
1,000 mm (3 ft 3 3/8 in)	Poland	Trams in Tarnów	1911-1942
1,000 mm (3 ft 3 3/8 in)	Poland	Trams in Wałbrzych	1898-1966
1,000 mm (3 ft 3 3/8 in)	Poland	Trams in Zgorzelec	Horse-drawn standard gauge 1882–1897, electric metre gauge 1897-1945
1,000 mm (3 ft 3 3/8 in)	Portugal	Trams in Coimbra	1874–1980
1,000 mm (3 ft 3 3/8 in)	Puerto Rico	Mayagüez Tramway Company	Battery-powered 1915–1927
1,000 mm (3 ft 3 3/8 in)	Puerto Rico	Trams in Ponce	Horse-drawn metre gauge 1880–1883, electric metre gauge 1902–1927
1,000 mm (3 ft 3 3/8 in)	Romania	The tram from Sibiu	1905–2011
1,000 mm (3 ft 3 3/8 in)	Russia	Trams in Pskov	1909–1944
1,000 mm (3 ft 3 3/8 in)	Russia	Trams in Sovetsk, Kaliningrad Oblast	1900–1944
1,000 mm (3 ft 3 3/8 in)	Switzerland	Trams in Biel/Bienne	Standard gauge 1877–1902, metre gauge 1902–1948
1,000 mm (3 ft 3 3/8 in)	Switzerland	Trams in Lausanne	1986–1964
1,000 mm (3 ft 3 3/8 in)	Thailand	Trams in Bangkok	Horse-drawn unknown gauge 1888–1892, electric metre gauge 1892–1968
1,000 mm (3 ft 3 3/8 in)	Thailand	Trams in Lopburi	1955–1962
1,000 mm (3 ft 3 3/8 in)	Ukraine	Trams in Molochnoye	1989–2014
1,000 mm (3 ft 3 3/8 in)	Ukraine	Trams in Simferopol	1914–1970
1,067 mm (3 ft 6 in)	Australia	Trams in Fremantle	1905–1952
1,067 mm (3 ft 6 in)	Australia	Trams in Hobart	1893–1961
1,067 mm (3 ft 6 in)	Australia	Trams in Kalgoorlie	1902–1952
1,067 mm (3 ft 6 in)	Australia	Trams in Launceston	1911–1952
1,067 mm (3 ft 6 in)	Australia	Trams in Perth	1899–1958
1,067 mm (3 ft 6 in)	Australia	Trams in Rockhampton	1909–1939
1,067 mm (3 ft 6 in)	Ireland	Dublin tramways	1872–1949
1,067 mm (3 ft 6 in)	Myanmar	Trams in Mandalay	1904–1942
1,067 mm (3 ft 6 in)	New Zealand	Dunedin cable tramway	1881–1957
1,067 mm (3 ft 6 in)	New Zealand	Maori Hill tramway (Dunedin)	1901–1936. Other electric tramlines in Dunedin were 4 ft 8 in (1,422 mm).
1,067 mm (3 ft 6 in)	New Zealand	Trams in Napier	1913–1931
1,067 mm (3 ft 6 in)	Panama	Trams in Panama	1893–1941
1,067 mm (3 ft 6 in)	United Kingdom	Birmingham Corporation Tramways	1904–1953
1,067 mm (3 ft 6 in)	United Kingdom	Camborne and Redruth Tramways	1902–1934
1,067 mm (3 ft 6 in)	United Kingdom	City of Carlisle Electric Tramways	1900–1931
1,067 mm (3 ft 6 in)	United Kingdom	Colchester Corporation Tramways	1904–1929
1,067 mm (3 ft 6 in)	United Kingdom	Wrexham and District Electric Tramways	1903–1927
1,067 mm (3 ft 6 in)	USA	Denver Tramway	1886–1950
1,067 mm (3 ft 6 in)	USA	Los Angeles Railway	1901–1963
1,067 mm (3 ft 6 in)	USA	Pelham Park and City Island Railway	1910-1913 Converted to 4 ft 8 1/2 in (1,435 mm) standard gauge in 1913
1,067 mm (3 ft 6 in)	USA	Portland Railway, Light and Power Company	1906–1924, Portland Electric Power Company (PEPCO) on April 26, 1924.
1,067 mm (3 ft 6 in)	USA	Portland Street Railway Company	1872–1906
1,067 mm (3 ft 6 in)	USA	San Diego Electric Railway	1892-1898 Converted to 4 ft 8 1/2 in (1,435 mm) standard gauge in 1898
1,100 mm (3 ft 7 5/16 in)	Germany	Trams in Kiel	1881–1985
1,100 mm (3 ft 7 5/16 in)	Germany	Lübeck tram	1881–1959
1,100 mm (3 ft 7 5/16 in)	Italy	Trams in Varese	1895–1950
1,188 mm (3 ft 10 25/32 in)	Indonesia	Trams in Jakarta, Trams in Surabaya	1869–1962
4 ft (1,219 mm)	New Zealand	Wellington tramway system	1904–1964
4 ft (1,219 mm)	United Kingdom	Accrington Steam Tramways Company; Accrington Corporation Tramways; Haslingden Corporation Tramways; Rossendale Valley Tramways; Rawtenstall Corporation Tramways	1886–1932
4 ft (1,219 mm)	United Kingdom	Barrow-in-Furness Tramways Company	1885–1932
4 ft (1,219 mm)	United Kingdom	Blackburn and Over Darwen Tramways Company; Blackburn Corporation Tramways; Darwen Corporation Tramways	1887–1949
4 ft (1,219 mm)	United Kingdom	Bradford Tramways Company; Bradford and Shelf Tramway Company; Bradford Corporation Tramways	1882-1950 Note: Tapering Gauge at Stanningley Town Street to connect to Leeds standard gauge, using splined axles.
4 ft (1,219 mm)	United Kingdom	Burnley Corporation Tramways; Nelson Corporation Tramways; Colne and Trawden Light Railway Company	1881–1935
4 ft (1,219 mm)	United Kingdom	Keighley Tramways Company	Horse-drawn 1889–1904
4 ft 7 3/4 in (1,416 mm)	United Kingdom	Glasgow Corporation Tramways	1872–1962
4 ft 7 3/4 in (1,416 mm)	United Kingdom	Huddersfield Corporation Tramways	1882–1940
4 ft 7 3/4 in (1,416 mm)	United Kingdom	Lanarkshire Tramways	1903–1931
4 ft 8 in (1,422 mm)	New Zealand	Dunedin electric trams	1903–1956. All lines except Maori Hill which was 1,067 mm (3 ft 6 in).

=== Standard gauge ===
Gauge	Country	Network	Comment
1,435 mm (4 ft 8 1/2 in)	Argentina	Tranvía del Este	2007–2012
1,435 mm (4 ft 8 1/2 in)	Australia	Trams in Brisbane	1885–1969
1,435 mm (4 ft 8 1/2 in)	Australia	Trams in Geelong	1912–1956
1,435 mm (4 ft 8 1/2 in)	Canada	Streetcars in Montreal	1861–1959
1,435 mm (4 ft 8 1/2 in)	Canada	Vancouver Downtown Historic Railway	Heritage streetcar (1998–2011)
1,435 mm (4 ft 8 1/2 in)	Canada	Cornwall Street Railway	Defunct. Used for both trams and for freight cars from the CN mainline. Used for freight only under catenary until 9 October 1971
1,435 mm (4 ft 8 1/2 in)	Canada	BC Electric Railway	Defunct, a part is used by the Southern Railway of British Columbia for freight.
1,435 mm (4 ft 8 1/2 in)	China	Trams in Shanghai	1908–1975
1,435 mm (4 ft 8 1/2 in)	China	Trams in Zhuhai	750V, TramWave and catenary in depot only 2017-2021
1,435 mm (4 ft 8 1/2 in)	Denmark	Trams in Copenhagen	1863–1972
1,435 mm (4 ft 8 1/2 in)	Germany	Trams in Bingen	1906–1955
1,435 mm (4 ft 8 1/2 in)	Germany	Trams in Bremerhaven	1881–1982
1,435 mm (4 ft 8 1/2 in)	Germany	Cuxhaven tram	1899–1914
1,435 mm (4 ft 8 1/2 in)	Germany	Trams in Eberswalde	1910–1940
1,435 mm (4 ft 8 1/2 in)	Germany	Trams in Gießen	1909–1953
1,435 mm (4 ft 8 1/2 in)	Germany	Trams in Hamburg	1866–1978
1,435 mm (4 ft 8 1/2 in)	Germany	Hildesheim tram	1905–1945
1,435 mm (4 ft 8 1/2 in)	Germany	Ingolstadt tram	1878–1921
1,435 mm (4 ft 8 1/2 in)	Germany	Kaiserslautern tram	1916–1935
1,435 mm (4 ft 8 1/2 in)	Germany	Oldenburg tram	1884–1888
1,435 mm (4 ft 8 1/2 in)	Germany	Stadthagen tram	1897–1930
1,435 mm (4 ft 8 1/2 in)	Germany	Trier tram	1890–1951
1,435 mm (4 ft 8 1/2 in)	Germany	Wilhelmshaven tram	1913–1945
1,435 mm (4 ft 8 1/2 in)	Isle of Man	Douglas Southern Electric Tramway	1896–1939
1,435 mm (4 ft 8 1/2 in)	Paraguay	Trams in Asunción	1871–1996
1,435 mm (4 ft 8 1/2 in)	Peru	Lima Tramway	1878–1965
1,435 mm (4 ft 8 1/2 in)	Poland	Trams in Koszalin	1911-1945
1,435 mm (4 ft 8 1/2 in)	Puerto Rico	Trams in San Juan	1900–1946
1,435 mm (4 ft 8 1/2 in)	South Africa	Trams in Johannesburg	1906–1961
1,435 mm (4 ft 8 1/2 in)	Spain	Vélez-Málaga Tram	2006-2012
1,435 mm (4 ft 8 1/2 in)	Ukraine	Trams in Kolomyia	Steam-powered 1886-ca.1944
1,435 mm (4 ft 8 1/2 in)	United Arab Emirates	Dubai Trolley	Heritage streetcar Fuel cells and battery, 2015–2019
1,435 mm (4 ft 8 1/2 in)	United Kingdom	Cambridge Street Tramways	Horse-drawn tramway service operating two routes, 1880–1914
1,435 mm (4 ft 8 1/2 in)	United Kingdom	Coventry Corporation Tramways	Coventry Corporation Tramways era: 1912–1940 Track gauge 1,435 mm (4 ft 8+1/2 in) Electric.
1,435 mm (4 ft 8 1/2 in)	United Kingdom	Leeds Corporation Tramways	1891-November 1959
1,435 mm (4 ft 8 1/2 in)	United Kingdom	Swansea and Mumbles Railway	Originally a mineral line, regauged and relaid a number of times, operated latterly as a tramway using the largest doubledeck trams ever made for UK use, often in pairs, closed by local bus company in 1960
1,435 mm (4 ft 8 1/2 in)	United Kingdom	Wisbech and Upwell tramway	A tramway in East Anglia that was built and operated by the Great Eastern Railway, operated later by the London and North Eastern Railway and finally operated by British Railways. 1883-1927 (Passengers), 1883-1966 (Goods)
1,435 mm (4 ft 8 1/2 in)	USA	Chicago Surface Lines	1913–1947
1,435 mm (4 ft 8 1/2 in)	USA	San Diego Electric Railway	1892-1949 (1,067 mm [3 ft 6 in] 1892–1898)
1,435 mm (4 ft 8 1/2 in)	USA	Greater Los Angeles Area, Pacific Electric	1901–1961
1,435 mm (4 ft 8 1/2 in)	USA	Streetcars in Washington, D.C.	1862-1962
1,435 mm (4 ft 8 1/2 in)	USA	DC Streetcar	2016-2026

=== Broad gauge ===
Gauge	Country	Network	Comment
1,445 mm (4 ft 8 7/8 in)	Italy	Trams in Bologna	1880–1963
1,445 mm (4 ft 8 7/8 in)	Italy	Tramway Milan-Limbiate	1882–2022
1,445 mm (4 ft 8 7/8 in)	Italy	Tramway Milan-Carate/Giussano	1881–2011
1,448 mm (4 ft 9 in)	South Africa	Trams in Cape Town	1896–1930
1,448 mm (4 ft 9 in)	United Kingdom	Belfast Corporation Tramways	1905–1954
1,450 mm (4 ft 9 3/32 in)	Germany	Zittau tram	1902 only, converted to 1,000 mm (3 ft 3 3/8 in), 1904–1919
1,450 mm (4 ft 9 3/32 in)	Puerto Rico	Ferrocarril Urbano de la Villa de Mayagüez	Horse-drawn 1875–1886
1,524 mm (5 ft)	Armenia	Yerevan tram	Originally 914 mm (3 ft) (1906–1918), 1933–2004
1,524 mm (5 ft)	Azerbaijan	Trams in Baku	1889–2004
1,524 mm (5 ft)	Azerbaijan	Trams in Ganja, Azerbaijan	1933–1976
1,524 mm (5 ft)	Azerbaijan	Trams in Sumgait	1959–2003
1,524 mm (5 ft)	Georgia	Trams in Tbilisi	914 mm (3 ft) (1883–1910) and metre gauge (1904–1934), 1,524 mm (5 ft) 1934–2006
1,524 mm (5 ft)	Kazakhstan	Trams in Almaty	1937–2015
1,524 mm (5 ft)	Kazakhstan	Trams in Karaganda	1950–1997
1,524 mm (5 ft)	Russia	Trams in Astrakhan	1900–2007
1,524 mm (5 ft)	Russia	Trams in Arkhangelsk	1916–2004
1,524 mm (5 ft)	Russia	Trams in Dzerzhinsk	1933–2015
1,524 mm (5 ft)	Russia	Trams in Grozny	1932-1994/95
1,524 mm (5 ft)	Russia	Trams in Ivanovo	1953–2008
1,524 mm (5 ft)	Russia	Trams in Karpinsk	1946–1994
1,524 mm (5 ft)	Russia	Trams in Komsomolsk-on-Amur	1957–2018
1,524 mm (5 ft)	Russia	Trams in Malyshev Log	1957–1961
1,524 mm (5 ft)	Russia	Trams in Novorossiysk	1934–1969
1,524 mm (5 ft)	Russia	Trams in Noginsk	1924–2013
1,524 mm (5 ft)	Russia	Trams in Ryazan	1963–2010
1,524 mm (5 ft)	Russia	Trams in Tver	1901–2018
1,524 mm (5 ft)	Russia	Trams in Ust-Ilimsk	1988–2022
1,524 mm (5 ft)	Russia	Trams in Voronezh	1926–2009
1,524 mm (5 ft)	Ukraine	Trams in Avdiivka	1965–2017
1,524 mm (5 ft)	Ukraine	Trams in Berdychiv	1892–1921
1,524 mm (5 ft)	Ukraine	Trams in Bilhorod-Dnistrovskyi	1904–1930
1,524 mm (5 ft)	Ukraine	Trams in Brovary	1934–1941
1,524 mm (5 ft)	Ukraine	Trams in Kerch	1935–1941
1,524 mm (5 ft)	Ukraine	Trams in Kostiantynivka	1931–2016
1,524 mm (5 ft)	Ukraine	Trams in Kramatorsk	1937–2017
1,524 mm (5 ft)	Ukraine	Trams in Luhansk	1934–2015
1,524 mm (5 ft)	Ukraine	Trams in Makiivka	1924–2006
1,524 mm (5 ft)	Ukraine	Trams in Stakhanov	1937–2008
1,524 mm (5 ft)	Ukraine	Trams in Sviatohirsk	1930–1941
1,524 mm (5 ft)	Ukraine	Trams in Vuhlehirsk	1958–1980
1,524 mm (5 ft)	USA	Trams in Camden	1871–1935
1,524 mm (5 ft)	USA	Trams in Louisville	?-1948
1,524 mm (5 ft)	Uzbekistan	Trams in Samarkand	1942–1973
1,524 mm (5 ft)	Uzbekistan	Trams in Tashkent	1912–2016
1,575 mm (5 ft 2 in)	USA	Trams in Columbus	1863–1948
1,588 mm (5 ft 2 1/2 in)	USA	Streetcars in Cincinnati	1859–1951
1,600 mm (5 ft 3 in)	Australia	Tramways in Adelaide	1879-?, Port Adelaide to Albert Park only
1,600 mm (5 ft 3 in)	Australia	St Kilda to Brighton Beach Street Railway (Melbourne)	1906–1959. Operated by Victorian Railways.
1,600 mm (5 ft 3 in)	Ireland	Dublin and Blessington Steam Tramway	Steam Tram 1888–1932
1,600 mm (5 ft 3 in)	Ireland	Hill of Howth Tramway	1901–1959
1,600 mm (5 ft 3 in)	USA	Trams in Altoona	188_-1954
1,676 mm (5 ft 6 in)	Chile	Trams in Valparaiso	1904–1952

== See also ==
- Acumulador de Carga Rápida
- Battery electric multiple unit
- Comparison of train and tram tracks
- Ground-level power supply
- List of tram and light rail transit systems
- List of battery operated trams
- List of track gauges
- List of railway electrification systems
- Narrow gauges used
- Rapid transit track gauge
- Reserved track
- Railway electrification
- Tramway track
- Traction current pylon
- Track gauge
- Tramway (disambiguation)
- Tramway (industrial)
