= Trams in Bielsko-Biała =

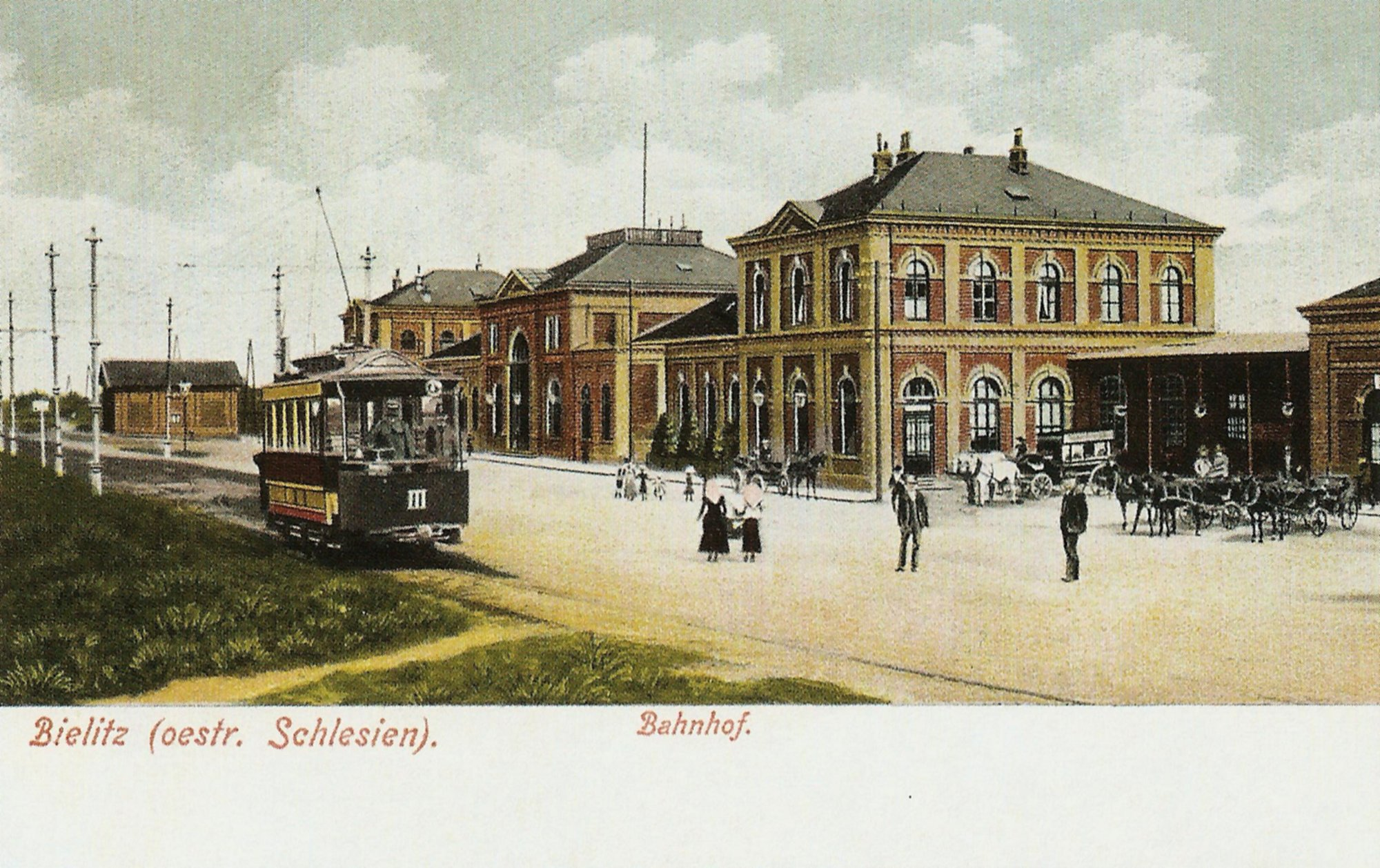

Overview
- Locale: Bielsko-Biała, Poland
- Transit type: Tram
- Number of lines: 2

Operation
- Began operation: 1895
- Ended operation: 1971

Technical
- Track gauge: 1,000 mm (3 ft 3 3/8 in)

Trams in Bielsko-Biała was a public transit system that operated in Bielsko-Biała, Poland from 1895 to 1971.

== History ==
The need for a city of Bielsko spoken widely in the last twenty years, the nineteenth century. Already in the year 1884 Bielska Gmina Council considered the idea of a tram line from the city's train station to the Cygański Las (Gypsy Wood), a forest in southern part of Bielsko-Biała. This area was a popular place for recreation and ceremonial area Bielszczan Willow.

In 1893, she was running a city power plant. Immediately after running one of its directors, Max Deri, and bielski Councilor Alojzy Bernaczik, had the authority to consent to build tram lines Train - Romany Forest. Its construction of the tram in years in October 1894 created the Committee of Local Railways Capital Iron. 7 February 1895, City Municipal Bielsko it concluded an agreement concerning the operation of the tramway.

They immediately began construction work. Buildings erected in the tram today remizy ul. Guerrillas (Blichowa) and built a wooden shed and waiting for the final stop in Gypsy Forest. Purchased tram fleet, which consisted of 5 motor cars type "Kummer" in Dresden, which may be used in two directions (line Bielska did not have end-loop) and 2 wagons with label doczepnych in Graz.

The first trial Bielsko tram ride took place on 23 October 1895 and was dropped remarkably successful. Normal operation of rolling stock was launched 11 December 1895.

Running in Bielsko tram line had 4,959 meters in length and was single line, with track gauge 1,000 mm (3 ft 3 3/8 in). This is maintained until the end of its existence. Traction was originally equipped with 7 turnouts, of which 2 were in the path ends, and in 14 stops. Proficiency route (today's street names): Railway Station - May 3 - Castle - May 1 - pl. Mickiewicza - Partyzantów - Kustronia - Olszowka - Romany Forest. Half of the lines were Sparkasse (savings Kasa, now square Bolesława Chrobrego) - Romany Forest. Average train speed then was 14 km / h. In 1908 brick depot was built in Gypsy Forest tramway.

== Liquidation ==
In the late 60s the existence of tramway traction in Bielsko-Biala faced the question, then similar to other Polish cities, about the liquidation of the tramway lines. The traffic in the city center was greatly increased, while the tramways reached their maximum transport capacities. A formal decision for the liquidation of the tramways was made in the MRN session on 16 September 1970.

Despite numerous protests by people of Bielsko-Biała, the line 2 was closed on 25 November 1970, and from 1 May 1971 the public transport was based only on buses. Line 2 has replaced the bus line K (Aleksandrowice - Partyzantów - 1 May - Aleksandrowice) with an option K bis (ZOR II – Dworzec) extended after the liquidation of the tram line 1 to People's Park.

After the liquidation of the tram network MPK bus transport was significantly expanded, based on 35 buses Ikarus which arrived from Łódź in exchange for tram cars not used in Bielsko-Biała.
