= Trams in Legnica =

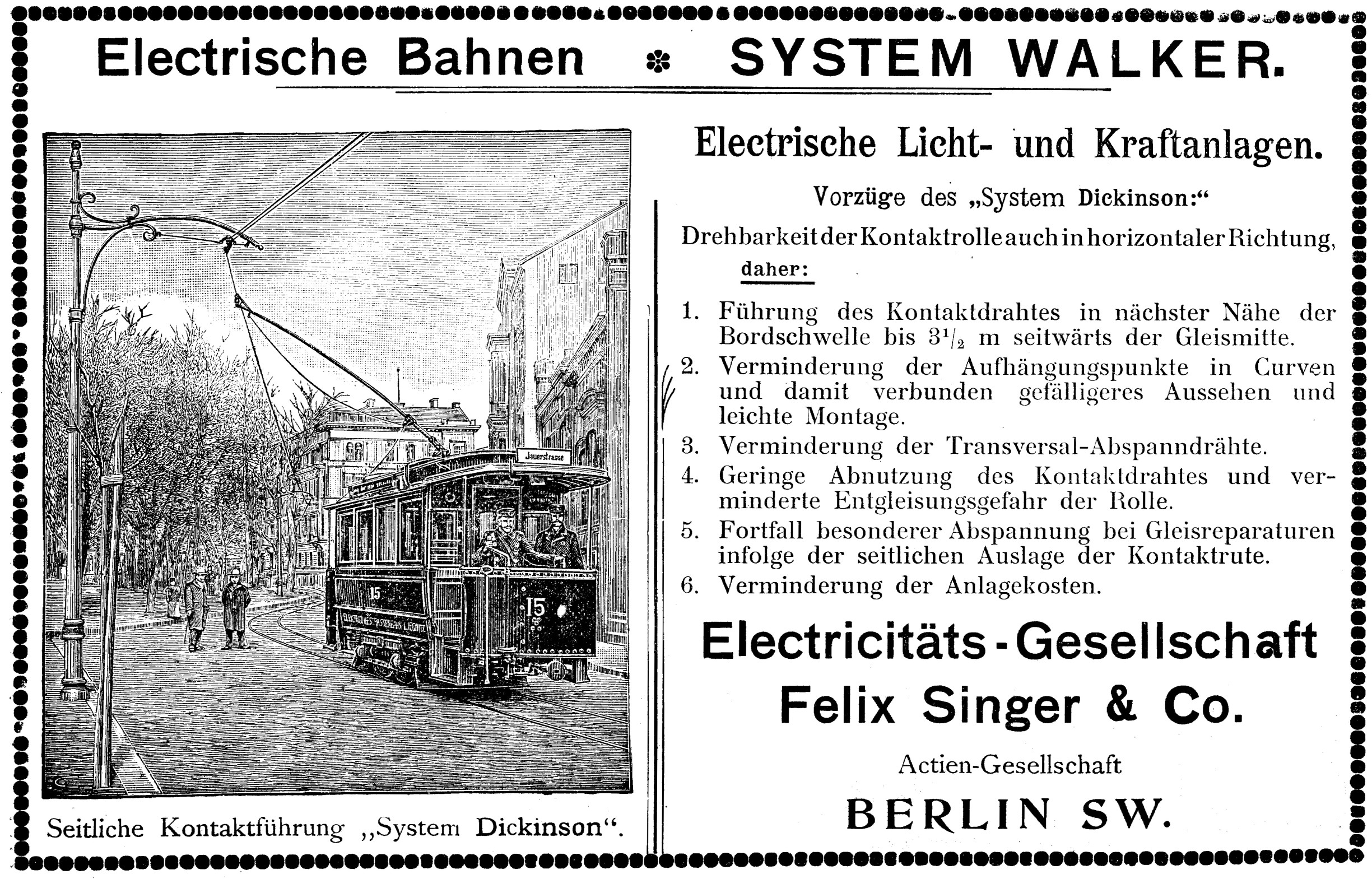
Advertisement of Electricitäts-Gesellschaft Felix Singer & Co. AG from Berlin from 1898, illustrated with Legnica motor streetcar no 15

Trams in Legnica was a former streetcar system operating in Legnica, Poland, between the years 1898–1968.

== Origin ==
Due to its medieval location, Legnica has functioned within the boundary of the city walls, the demolition of which was initiated in 1760 and ended with an intensive action of demolishing after 1860. The effects of the Industrial Revolution: the Berlin-Wrocław Railroad and the creation of the factory district resulted in an influx of workers into the city, which had about 7,000 inhabitants in the early 19th century[4]. After 1860, companies erected quarters of four-story tenement houses for workers around the Old Town (Kartuzy district, outskirts of Tarninowo), which increased the area of the city and enabled the influx of people, and in consequence, triggered the need to organize public transportation.

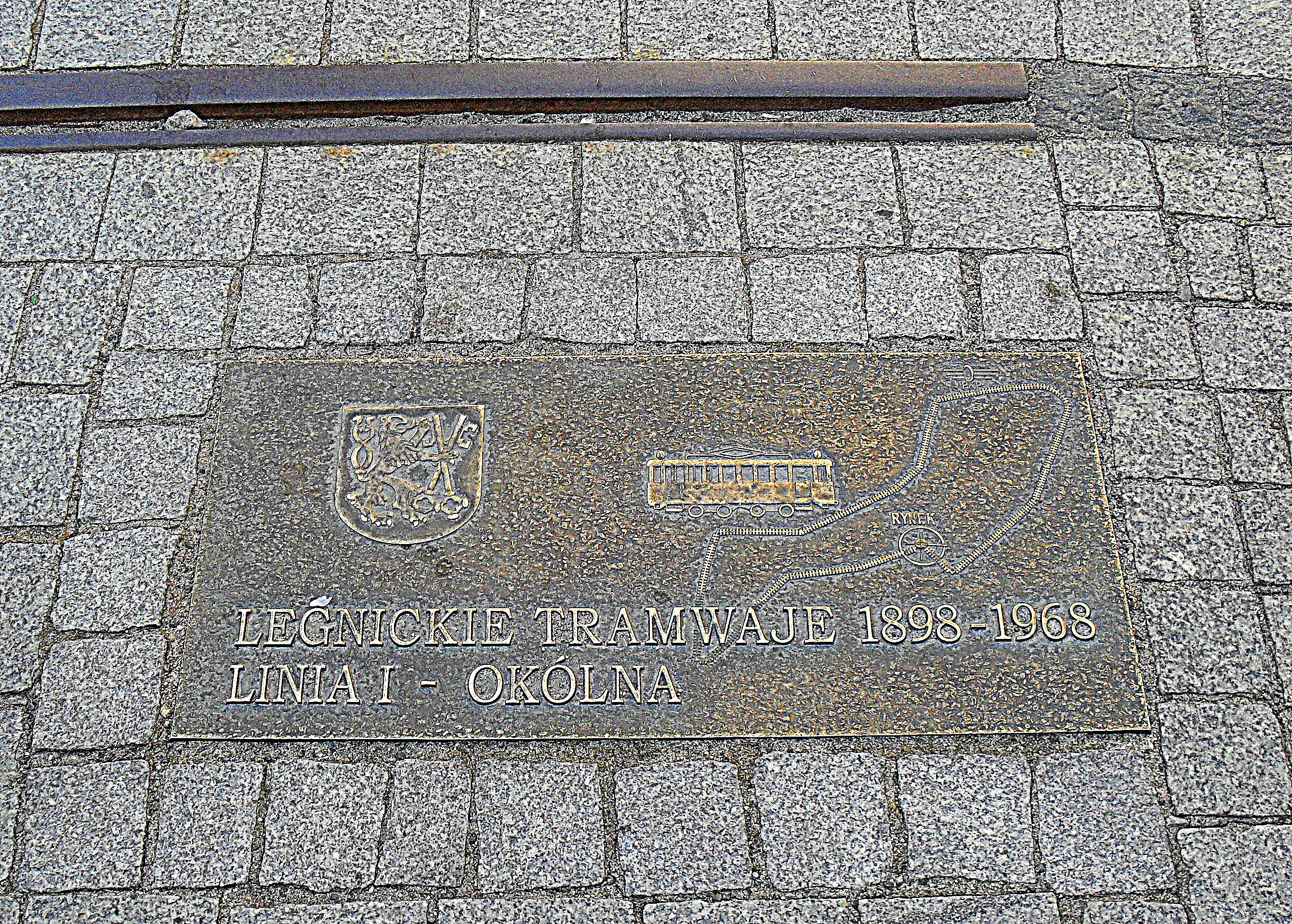
Commemorative plaque on the Market Square

In 1878–1880, the local government of Legnica rejected proposals for the introduction of passenger and passenger-cargo horse streetcars by private concessionaires, as well as the introduction of freight transport using a steam streetcar in 1880 and a gas passenger streetcar in 1896. Refusals were based on unsatisfactory financial conditions of the offers. On June 22–24, 1896, Felix Singer & Co. from Berlin (which already had a streetcar network in Bamberg at the time) was granted a concession for the parallel construction of a narrow-gauge (1000 mm) electric streetcar and equipping the city with a power network, which Legnica lacked at that time. Felix Singer & Co.'s special-purpose subsidiary „Gesellschaft Elektrizitäts-Werk Liegnitz” (using the acronym EWL) has gained a monopoly on the sale of electricity in the city in exchange for the obligation to provide city transport and transfer part of the ticket revenues to the municipal budget. The construction of streetcar lines and equipping the city with electricity was part of the policy of the long-time mayor Ottomar Oertel, who focused on the development of the municipal infrastructure in his early years.

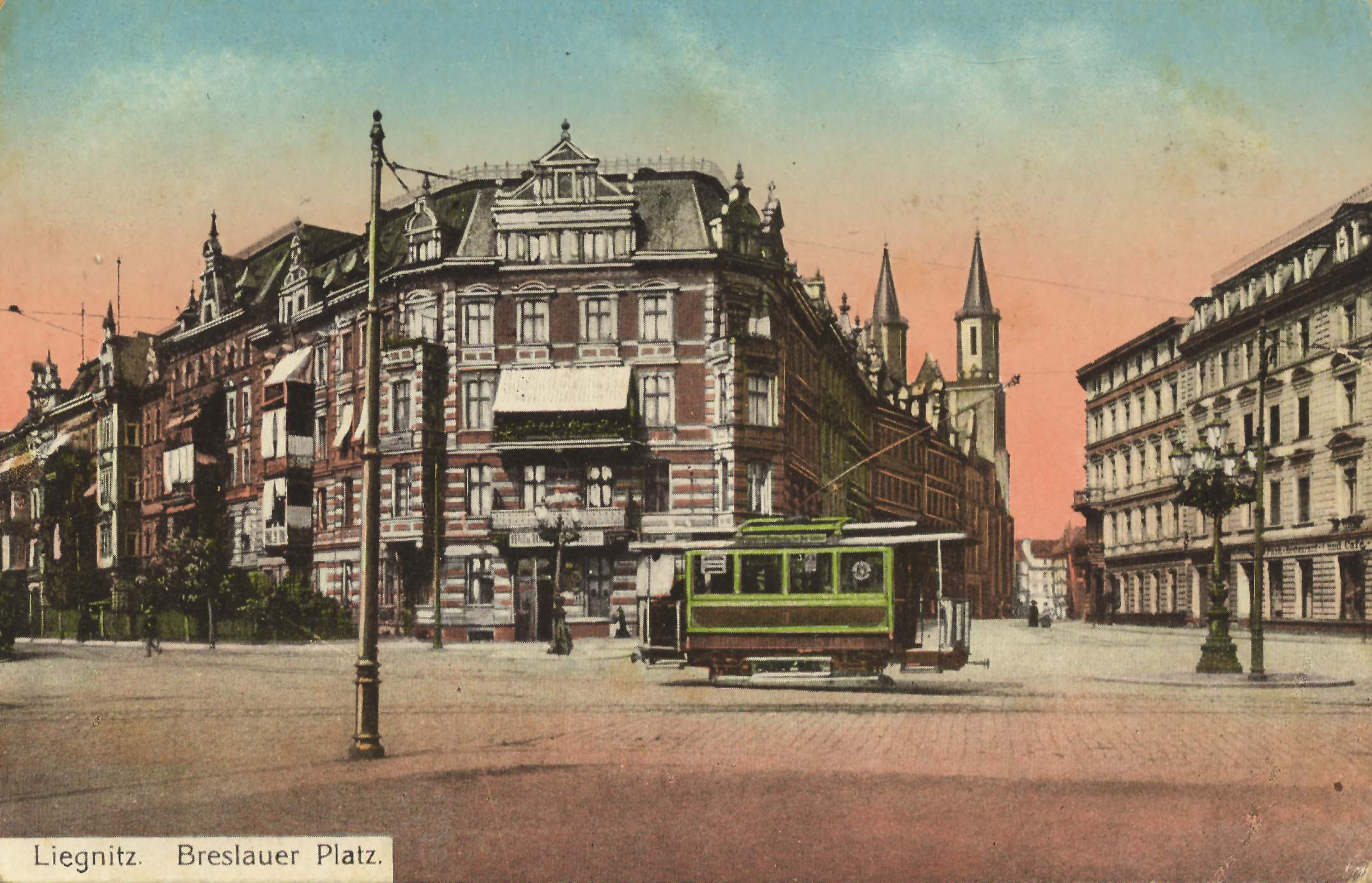
A pre-war postcard with a streetcar on Wilson Square

After 1945, there was a widespread opinion in press articles and publications that the horse streetcar project was realized in 1882[4]. More recent research has shown that these claims were wrong.

== 1898-1945 ==
(The original street names used at the time are given in italics.)

The streetcar routes and the first power plant in Legnica, which had 50,000 inhabitants at the time, were opened on 21 January 1898 after construction that lasted for 6 months.

Initially three routes were built:

- A circular line, from the railroad station through Libana Street, Wilson Square (Breslauer Platz), Witelona and Skarbka Street (Gartenstr.), Cathedral Square (Passage), Market Square (Ring), Złotorska (Goldberger Str.), Hutników (Grenadierstr.), Chojnowska (Haynauer Str.), Market, Grodzka (Burgstr.) and Nowa (Glogauer Str.) to the station.
- Transversal line from Sciegienny Street (Hedwigstr.) through Skłodowska-Curie (Lübenerstr.), Rycerska (Ritterstr.), Cathedral Square (Passage), Slavic Square (Friedrichplatz), Mickiewicza street (Luisenstr.), Łukasiński Str. (Schützenstr.) and Jaworzyńska (Jauerstr.) to Tarnów.
- A line to the cemetery from Wilson Square (Breslauer Platz) through Wroclawska Str. (Breslauer Str.) to the municipal cemetery (the depot was erected on the opposite side).

Streetcars running on different lines in the years 1898-1940 were marked with colored shields.

The entire network consisted of 9.271 km of single track with loops (including marginal), the rolling stock built for the Legnica network consisted of 18 motor cars and 5 trailers built at the Waggonfabrik Breslau factory. Initially, the circular line ran at a frequency of up to 7.5 minutes, while other lines every 10 minutes.

The completed layout of the city lines turned out to be incorrect and the financial results of the streetcar operator differed from previous projections. On January 31, 1900, with the consent of the city council, traffic was suspended on the least frequented section of the network from Cathedral Square to Ściegiennego Street. In March 1901, pushing the snow on the tracks suspended traffic on the entire network for five days. The management of the streetcar company applied for permission to reduce the frequency of trams and change the circular line into a straight one, moving the tracks to Skarbowa (Klosterstr.) and Najswietszej Maria Panny (Frauenstr.) streets. Eventually, before the extension in 1911, traffic on the network was carried out on two lines:

- Cathedral Square (Passage), Market Square (Ring), Złotoryjska (Goldberger Str.), Hutników (Grenadierstr.), Chojnowska (Haynauer Str.) streets, Market Square, Grodzka (Burgstr.) and Nowa (Glogauer Str.) streets, at the railroad station, Lebana (Gartenstrasse), and Wroclawska (Breslauer Str.) streets to the cemetery.
- Cathedral Square (Passage), Slavic Square (Friedrichplatz), Mickiewicz (Luisenstr.), Łukasiński (Schützenstr.) and Jaworzyńska (Jauerstr.) streets to the "Dornbusch" in Traninów.

Before World War II Legnica was an agricultural town. Between 1911 and 1913, the tram network was extended to suburban areas: on May 9, 1913, the line south of Tarninów was extended to the Tivoli Inn near Wielogórska Street in Przybków (Prinkendorf), and on August 29, 1913, the line towards the cemetery to the Musentempel Inn in the suburb of Piekary Wielkie (Groß-Beckern). The extension was accompanied by an expansion of the rolling stock by 4 motor and two trailer cars, similar to those already in possession (with the difference of built-in trailer platforms), and the introduction of vehicles on all lines every 15 minutes (frequency drop).

From December 31, 1922 to July 5, 1924, the operation of streetcars was suspended due to hyperinflation in Germany. Tram traffic was only resumed on the city line on the section Cathedral Square (Passage) - Market Square (Ring) - Złotoryjska Street (Goldberger Str.) with a frequency of 15 minutes and on suburban lines to Piekary Wielkie and Przybkow (courses every 15 and 30 minutes respectively).

The extension of the town's outskirts with new buildings of rent societies resulted in the expansion of the existing tracks - a branch of the former circular line. The track in Chojnowska Street was extended from Hutników Street to Boczna Street, and in Złotoryjska Street to Łużycki Square (Logauplatz). On July 18, 1927 all three lines were directed to the railroad station, and on August 25, 1927 two routes were extended to sections of the extensions to the temporary end stops: the city line from Hutników Street to the corner of Złotoryjska and Grunwaldzka streets (Friedrich-Ebert Str.), and the line from Piekary Wielkie to the reactivated track through the Old Town, then through a new section in Chojnowska Street to the corner with today's Szweczenko Street. The track in Hutników Street was thus cut off from the network. The target length of the network (13.9 km) was reached in 1928. Municipal and Piekary Wielkie lines operated at 15-minute intervals. The line to Przybkow operated every 30 minutes, but in 1928 additional courses were introduced after 12:00 which supplemented the cycle to run every 15 minutes. In 1933 the track in Złotoryjska Street was extended to Łużycki Square.

In the years 1927–1933, only small investments in infrastructure were made: construction of streetcar waiting rooms and network renovations (short fragments of tracks and catenary wire network). The streetcar rolling stock was modified by converting selected motor vehicles into trailers and thus obtaining 16 double-car drafts of cars. Next, all engine cars were replaced with more massive and capacious cars produced by MAN, imported from Zwickau (5 cars from 1910 to 1911, imported between December 10 and 13, 1927 and implemented after a few months in 1928) and Essen (12 cars from 1899 to 1900 built in the Falkenried factory, 1929–1932), whereas the existing motor cars were converted into trailers.

The technical condition of Legnica's tram infrastructure and rolling stock in the 1930s was insufficient and required high financial resources to maintain its functionality. The greatest problem with the increasing number of passengers was the limited capacity of the single-track narrow-gauge network. On September 17, 1937, the connection between the new districts in the north and south of the city (Głogów and Bielany suburbs) and the old town and the railroad station was launched, it was run by the first public city bus line operated by a streetcar company. The bus line was extended in 1939, and at the turn of 1939 and 1940, due to the war (shortage of liquid fuels), it was temporarily suspended and then re-opened on a shorter route.

The licence of the Legnica streetcar operator expired at the end of 1938. The Magistrate of Legnica signed a new licence contract with the EWL company for 66 years (covering the years 1939–2004), which included the right of the city council to share in profits (should they be made).

The public-private company Elektricitäts-Werke Liegnitz (EWL) focused on making profits from selling electricity. In 1939, the shareholders of EWL (55% owned by Elektrowerke AG of Berlin, 16% by the city of Legnica, 13% by the surrounding counties, and the remainder by the local governments where the company sold energy) urged the representatives of the Legnica city magistrate to give up streetcars for the trolleybuses developed in the Third Reich, which were considered cheaper and easier to operate. The management of the EWL proposed a complete replacement of tramways with trolleybuses within five years (1941-1946). Eventually, one trolleybus line was launched, partially duplicating the route of the streetcar line later designated as number 1 (Łużycki Square - railroad station), and an access route for trolleybuses to the depot was built (shared with the streetcars), which was to be part of the second trolleybus line to Piekary Wielkie.

On August 1, 1940, the existing streetcar lines were numbered. From then on there were three sequentially numbered lines:

- 1: Łużycki Square - railroad station,
- 2: Piekary Wielkie - railroad station - Chojnowska street,
- 3: Przybków - railroad station.

During World War II, the copper contact wire was replaced with steel (non-ferrous metals were confiscated for military purposes). In 1942, three wagons from Legnica were sold to German-occupied Łódź, and one trailer was imported from Görlitz.

Between 1898 and 1945, the streetcar company in Legnica owned 17 to 21 motor vehicles and 5 to 13 trailers at the same time. The electric voltage in the catenary line in Legnica was 500 volts.

At the beginning of 1945, in the face of the progress of the Lower Silesia operation of the Soviet Army and the approaching front, Legnica was being prepared for defense, and the public transport was immobilized.

== 1945-1968 ==
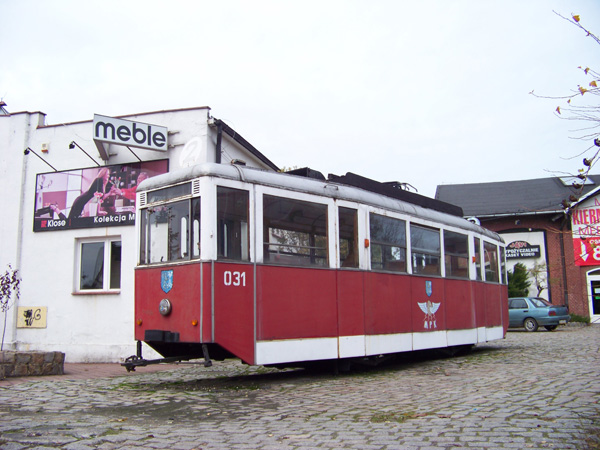
Konstal 5N originating from Elbląg, placed in front of the former streetcar depot between 1998 and 2014. The streetcar differs in details from those operated until 1968 in Legnica

On February 9, 1945 Legnica was captured by the Red Army. Immediately after World War II, the town was incorporated into Poland as part of the so-called Regained Territories under the international provisions of the Yalta Conference. Settlers and expatriates began to arrive in Legnica in April 1945. The Polish delegation officially took over from the Soviet commandantry on May 15, 1945. The tramway company was initially the only municipal enterprise transferred to the Polish authorities. A group of 27 people, thirteen pioneers and fourteen Germans, divided into three brigades (for the depot, track and power supply), immediately began work on rebuilding the streetcar company in the second half of May 1945. Streetcarts abandoned and scattered as barricades before the Russian entry were recovered from the streets: 13 motor vehicles and 7 trailers. The first key problems included: destroyed, collapsed tracks in the streets and partially looted depot and power plant. From July 15 to October 1945, the part of Legnica on the left bank of the Kaczawa River, including the old town and Tarninów, was closed by the Soviet army to the Polish population. The streetcars were ceremonially launched on October 31, 1945, on the day the town's authorities returned to the downtown area. Traffic was resumed with 4 renovated motor vehicles on three lines, which were shortened due to the devastation and incompleteness of the catenary network:

- 1: Łużycki Square - railroad station,
- 2: Wrocławska Street (intersection with Różana Street) - railroad station - Chojnowska Street (intersection with Żołnierska Street),
- 3: Przybków - railroad station.

In the years 1946–1950, with the acquisition of materials, the pre-war length of routes and the number of rolling stock was restored. It was based on the former German property, rails and carts were renovated. Streetcar engines from Katowice were acquired.

The bus line between Bielany and the streetcar line junction near the station, supplementing the Legnica transportation network, was launched on 23 May 1948 with vehicles obtained from the army. The infrastructure of the trolleybus line, which was to replace the streetcars before the war, was eventually moved to the "A" line, where buses and trolleybuses ran simultaneously in the years 1949–1956.

The company's names were changed frequently: Tram Management at the City Council, Municipal Electric Railway, Municipal Electric Trams, Municipal Transport Company. In the years 1950–1954, the tramway company was part of the municipal utility company, and then, at the beginning of 1955, it was separated as the Municipal Transport Company.

By the decision of the government of the People's Republic of Poland made in 1951, as part of a six-year plan, copper industry plants were located in Legnica. The construction of the Legnica Copper Smelter resulted in the extension of streetcar line no. "1" by 2.5 kilometers, from the existing terminus to the plant. The original idea was to bring the "1" line to the Pawłowice Małe railroad station, where the employees were commuting, eventually the line was completed with a loop near the management building of the plant. On December 13, 1952, a street loop at the other end of the line, in the center of Legnica, was put into operation, using a track connection through the marketplace, partly with tracks not used since 1900. The streetcar tracks used on the route from Łużycki Square to the steelworks cracked under the weight of the vehicles, which is why they were replaced in 1955 with track used for railroad transport.

In the years 1950–1955, worn out tramcars were exchanged for second-hand streetcars, acquired from:

- Katowice, 6 units, including:
  - at least 1 produced by Werkspoor Utrecht for Amsterdam in 1904, imported to Bytom in 1940 along with 5 similar carts; acquired for Legnica in 1950–1953,
- Łódź, 11 units, including:
  - 3 Simmering I type engine cars from the Viennese Maschinen-und Waggonbau-Fabriks-A.-G. factory produced for Łódź in 1927,
  - 2 Simmering II type engine cars from the above-mentioned factory, manufactured for Łódź in 1928,
  - 2 Lilpop type motor cars from 1927,
  - 2 Sanok motor cars from 1928,
  - 2 Herbrand trailers made by Herbrand
- Wałbrzych
  - 1 motor car produced by Linke-Hofmann Werke for Walbrzych from 1899 to 1900.

Two used streetcar trailers were acquired in 1956 from Jelenia Góra.

In 1951, for the first time since the launch of the network, a brand new streetcar, Konstal 2N, was delivered to Legnica (by decision of the Ministry of Municipal Economy, it was moved to Łódź a year later). Then, 4 similar streetcars type 2N were acquired in 1955, and in the years 1958-1961 19 Konstal 5N cars (12 motor cars and 7 trailers). The acquisition of second-hand rolling stock was related to the construction of the line to the steelworks. The allocation of new N-type streetcars by the Ministry of Municipal Economy allowed for the decommissioning of all pre-war production vehicles.

At the same time, since 1955, based on used, and since 1956 brand new buses, bus lines have been developed in the city's areas without streetcar lines (provided the same connections as the pre-war bus lines, connecting the railroad station, Bielany and Głogów suburbs) and in the suburban area[48]. In 1960, one bus VKT was 1/3 more expensive than that of the streetcars, but the trend was slowly reversing.

The end-of-life streetcar infrastructure posed problems in terms of traffic flow. The tracks were extremely worn out, frequent breakdowns consisting of axle fractures on bumps occurred repeatedly, followed by problems with voltage drop on the line to the steelworks after the introduction of heavier N-type vehicles.

Builty forty years earlier, functioning in different realities, single-track routes with loops did not guarantee adequate capacity, that would allow streetcars to run at a frequency providing efficient transport. Streetcars ran for many years without precise timetables. Until 1963, Legnica did not comply with the law on the right-hand traffic, which required to block the door on the left-hand side in the direction of driving, despite regulatory attempts made in 1959.

Due to the demolition of the destroyed Old Town in Legnica, the tramway service between the railroad station and Chojnowska Street was abandoned, and a bus line from Kartuzy was diverted there. As a result of the closure of the crossing through the Market Square between 10 April and 30 September 1961, a new street loop was constructed, via Dworcowa, Skarbowa and Parkowa streets to Wilson Square. In January 1961, three 5N motor streetcars were allocated to MPK Legnica (the last delivery of streetcars); attempts were made to increase the streetcars' capacity in the same year, by adding additional pass-bys. Ongoing repairs were carried out with the use of rails from demolished inner-city tracks and those acquired from MPK Wałbrzych.

After World War II, in the United States and in Europe, tramway networks were massively liquidated due to the improved availability of road transport (including trolleybuses and buses). Moreover, in the late 1950s and early 1960s in Poland, there was a tendency to keep streetcars functioning only in large cities. In the course of internal discussions on the comprehensive reconstruction of Lower Silesian cities, the provincial authorities in Wrocław decided to replace the inefficient narrow gauge streetcars in Legnica with more expensive but more efficient bus transport. The intention to replace all streetcar lines with buses was first communicated to the public by the Polish United Workers' Party authorities in 1961 in the pages of "Wiadomości Legnickie", informing that the liquidation of streetcars would be phased over ten years. The increase in production and availability of San buses accelerated the liquidation of individual lines. During the session of 4 August 1966 Presidium of the City National Council decided to replace the streetcar line to Przybkow by buses, which happened after the delivery of vehicles on 6 April 1967. Further allocations of buses enabled the liquidation of the streetcar line to the steelworks on 10 June 1968 and increase of its frequency (13 buses instead of 5 streetcars). Streetcars on the last functioning line, connecting the railroad station in Legnica and the village Piekary Wielkie, were replaced by new buses as of 1 July 1968.

On 3 July 1968 a special last streetcar (a motor car with a semi-trailer) set off from the depot in Wrocławska street, its journey across the network was a farewell ceremony for the streetcars of Legnica.

In the period 1945–1968, the tramway company in Legnica owned from 20 to 31 cars, including 13 to 23 motorized vehicles.

== Network decommissioning ==
On 28 July 1968 a brigade was appointed in MPK to liquidate the tramway infrastructure. The infrastructure of the Legnica streetcars was dismantled in the period from June to October 1968. The so-called rosettes (decorated anchors on which catenary cables were hung) were left on the walls of tenement houses. The separate tracks were dismantled between July and November 1968; the rails were sold to MZK in Grudziądz. Tracks installed in paved streets were left until their modernisation; sometimes, along with cobblestones, they were covered with asphalt. The longest exposed section of streetcar rails with a preserved passing track was located (until being dismantled during street renovation in 2017) in the course of Wrocławska Street in Kartuzy. Sent back in 1953, the first Legnica 2N-type car was used as a line car in Łódź until 1 November 1977, and, after conversion to a learning vehicle, until November 1991. The remaining 2N cars were sent to Bydgoszcz (1 engine car) and Grudziądz (2 engine cars) in 1967[64]. In 1968 the remaining cars were transferred to: Bydgoszcz (2 engine cars and 4 semi-trailer cars), Łódź (5 engine cars) and Toruń (10 cars: 6 engine cars and 4 semi-trailer cars). The seat of the MPK management was moved in 1965 to a new bus depot built in 1963–1965. The old depot was renovated while it was still in operation in 1966–1967, changing the appearance of the building significantly (rough façade, bigger metal gates), and returned to the disposal of the city authorities after the last streetcars were removed in September 1968.

In 1998, the Legnica Copper Museum acquired a 5N tramcar from Elbląg on the occasion of the anniversary of the launch and decommissioning of the Legnica streetcars, which was styled as a Legnica tramcar and placed in front of the former depot[67]. In 2015, the Municipal Transport Company of Legnica took the streetcar for renovation and reconstruction in the shape of the original 5N vehicles. During the renovation of the Market Square in 2010, a fragment of the tracks and a commemorative plaque were built into the cobblestones in the place of the former streetcar pass.

== Literature ==
- Eysymontt Rafał: Architektura i rozwój przestrzenny w XIX i na początku XX wieku. W: Legnica. Zarys monografii miasta. Dąbrowski Stanisław (red.). Wrocław-Legnica: Wydawnictwo DTSK Silesia, 1998, s. 320–352, seria: Monografie Regionalne Dolnego Śląska. ISBN 83-904226-4-6. (pol.)
- Ludger Kenning, Mattis Schindler: Obusse in Deutschland. T. 1: Berlin – Brandenburg – Mecklenburg-Vonpommern – Schleswig-Holstein – Hamburg – Bremen – Niedersachsen – Sachsen-Anhalt – Thüringen – Sachsen – Frühere deutsche Ostgebiete. Nordhorn: Verlag Kenning, 2008. ISBN 978-3-933613-34-9. (ger.)
- Przemysław Nadolski, Dariusz Walczak, Zbigniew Danyluk, Bohdan Turżański: Tramwaje dolnośląskie. T. 2: Historia tramwajów i trolejbusów w Legnicy. Rybnik: Wydawnictwo Eurosprinter, 2015. ISBN 978-83-63652-14-2. (pol. • ger.)
- Tadeusz Rollauer: 60 lat Miejskiego Przedsiębiorstwa Komunikacyjnego w Legnicy. Legnica: Wydawnictwo Edytor, 2006. (pol.)
- Szkurłatowski Zbigniew: Przemiany gospodarcze, procesy ludnościowe, warunki socjalne w latach 1945–1989. W: Legnica. Zarys monografii miasta. Dąbrowski Stanisław (red.). Wrocław-Legnica: Wydawnictwo DTSK Silesia, 1998, s. 464–508, seria: Monografie Regionalne Dolnego Śląska. ISBN 83-904226-4-6. (pol.)
- Zdancewicz Damian: Legnica. W: Tramwaje w Polsce. Żurawicz Justyna (red.). Łódź: Księży Młyn, 2013, s. 134–139. ISBN 978-83-7729-215-0. (pol.)
