= Trams in Białystok =

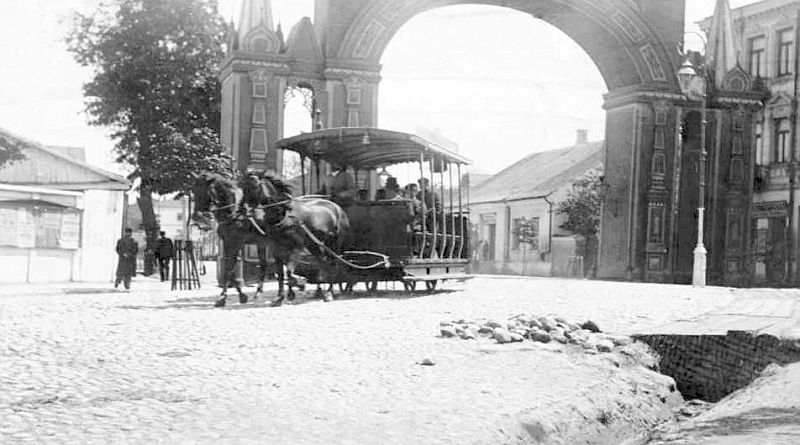
Photo of Lipowa street

Trams in Białystok were a tramway communication system operating in Białystok, Poland, between 1895 and 1915.

== History ==
In 1893, the City Council of Białystok signed a contract with Leontiy Feldzer to operate the first city's horse tram. In 1895 the first carts set off from the railway station through Lipowa Street to Świętojańska Street. During World War I stables and tram carriages burnt down, and the liquidation of tram tracks from the city area began.

In 1922 the Tram Society in Białystok was established. At the same time, a project for building an electric tram was started, but was never completed.
