= Trams in Münster =

Forgotten trams in Germany

Coordinates: 51°58′N 07°38′E

Münster tramway network
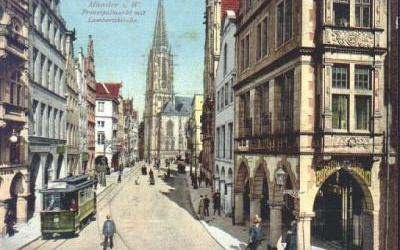
- A tram in Prinzipalmarkt, Münster, 1919

Operation
- Locale: Münster, North Rhine-Westphalia, Germany
- Open: 13 July 1901; 125 years ago
- Close: 25 November 1954; 71 years ago
- Status: Closed
- Operator: Stadtwerke Münster

Infrastructure
- Track gauge: 1,000 mm (3 ft 3 3/8 in) metre gauge
- Propulsion system: Electricity

Statistics
Overview
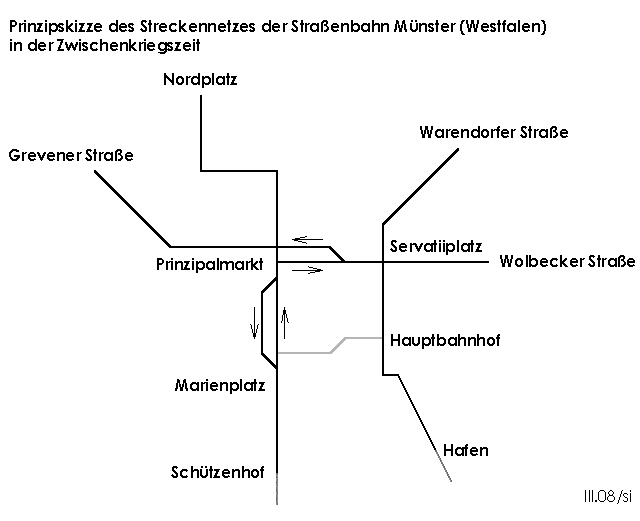
The network during the Interbellum
- Website: http://www.stadtwerke-muenster.de Stadtwerke Münster (in German)

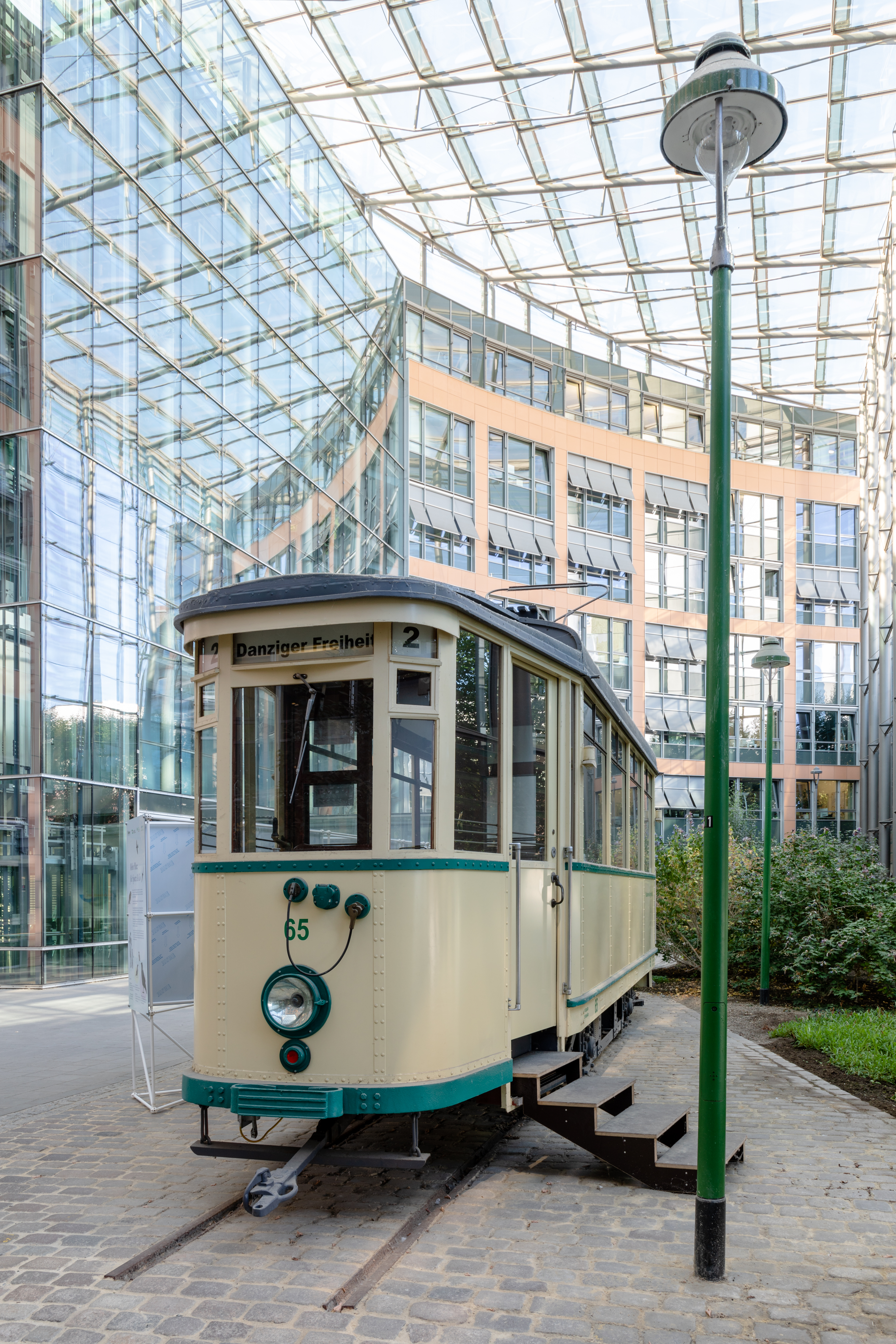
Restored Gothaer railcar 65 in the town house 3 in Münster

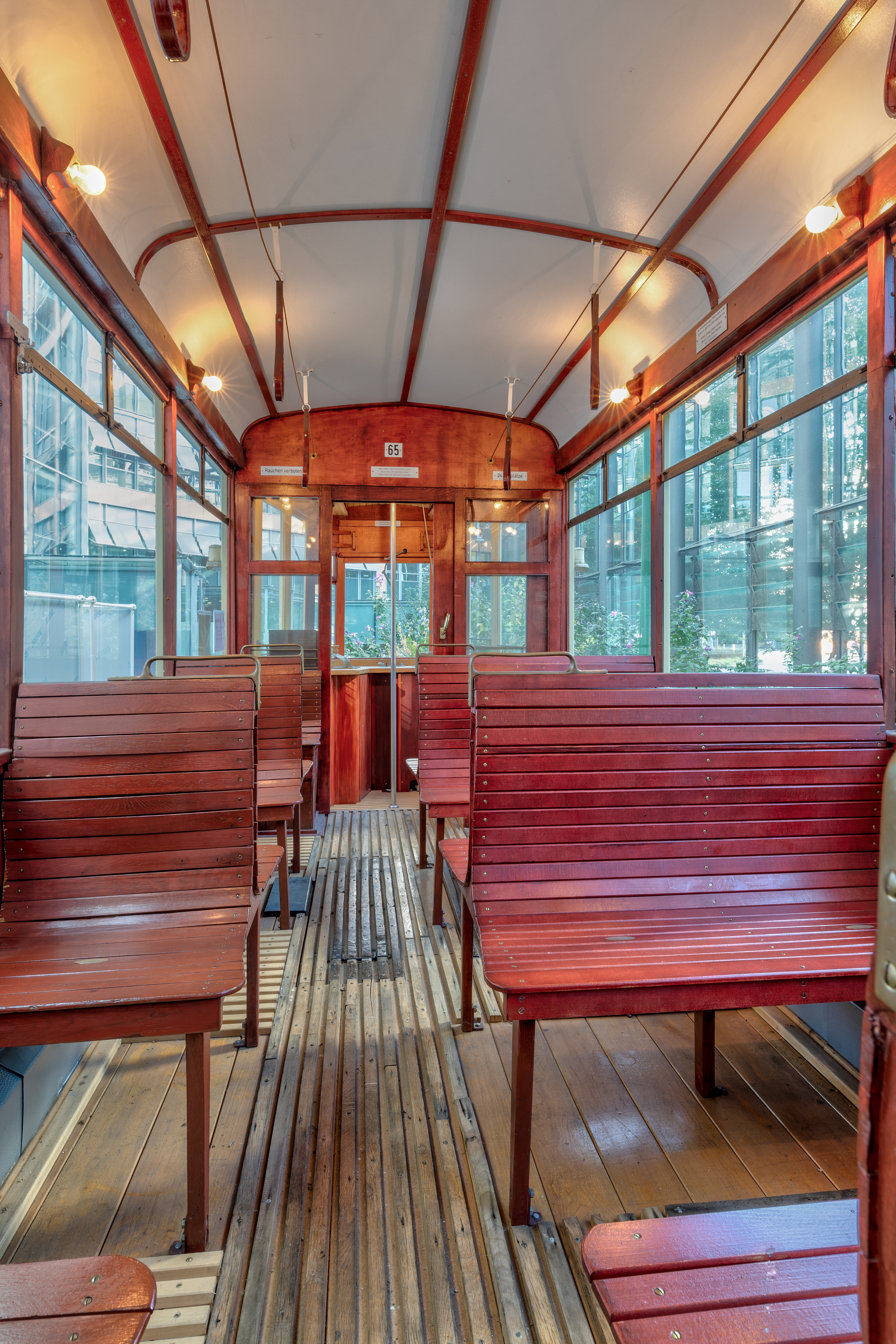
Restored Gothaer railcar 65 in the town house 3 in Münster

The Münster tramway network (German: Straßenbahnnetz Münster) once formed part of the public transport system in Münster, now in the federal state of North Rhine-Westphalia, Germany. Opened in 1901, the network lasted until 1954.

== See also ==
- List of town tramway systems in Germany
- Trams in Germany
