= Trams in Inowrocław =

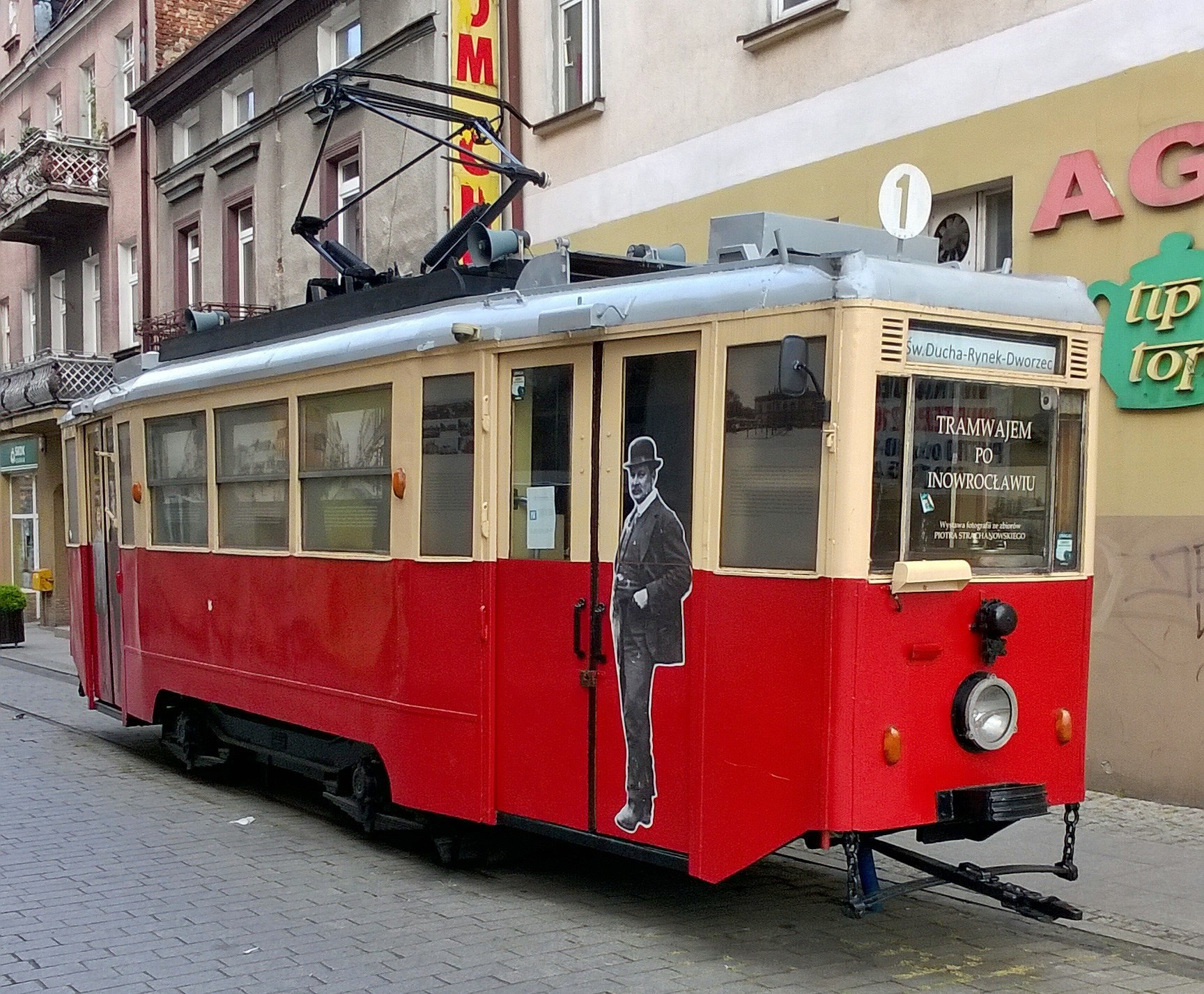
Example of a museum tram in the city

Trams in Inowrocław were a tramway communication system operating in Inowrocław in the years 1912–1962.

== History ==
The system was launched on 10 November 1912, when the first tram went from the railway station to the Market Square. In 1918, when Inowrocław became Polish property, the tramway communication was restarted.

The last section was closed on 31 December 1962.

By the inhabitants of Inowrocław, the tram was commonly called "bimba".
