= Trams in Koszalin =

There were three tram lines in Koszalin, Poland (formerly known as Köslin). The first line, 3.5 km long, was launched on 21 December 1911.

== History ==
The impulses for the creation of the system were the general electrification of the city and an industrial and craft exhibition planned for 1912. The line ran from the railway station, through the city center, to the end of the present Piłsudskiego Street.

In the years 1922–1924, due to an economic crisis, trams were suspended. The second line was created in 1925 and ran along the current Zwycięstwa Street to Rokosowo (the new section was 2.8 km long). Both these lines were liquidated on February 1, 1937. The third line started to operate on July 1, 1913, after the bankruptcy of the local railway from Uniescie to Koszalin (launched in 1905).

The tramway connection (called the "beach railway") used the existing infrastructure of the former railway. This line as the last one was closed on 30 September 1938.

== Literature ==
- Karl-Heinz Drewelow, Wolfgang Krüger: . Bufe-Fachbuch-Verlag, Egglham 1989, ISBN 3-922138-36-5.
- Jörn Müller, Rolf Roland Scholze: . VBN Verlag B. Neddermeyer, Berlin 2015, ISBN 978-3-941712-44-7.
