= Simferopol tram =

Simferopol tramway
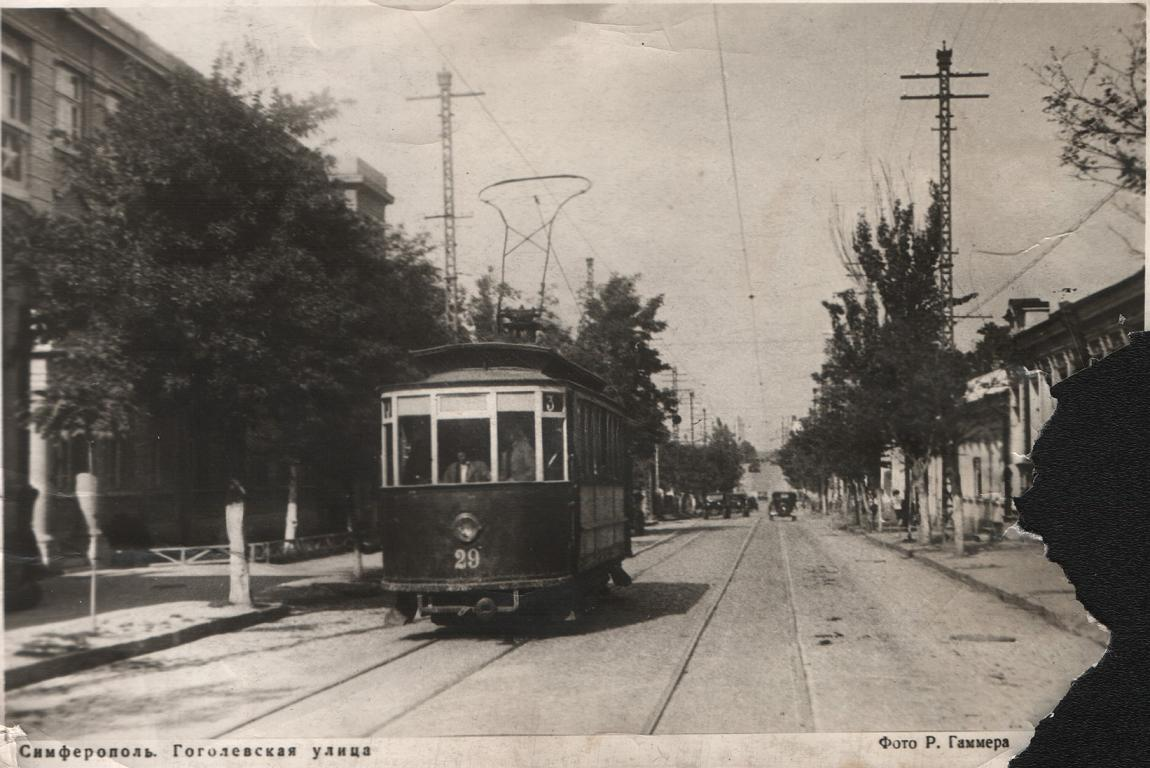
- Tram on Gogol street in Simferopol. 1930ss

Operation
- Locale: Russian Empire; USSR; Simferopol

Statistics
Tram era: 1914–1970
- Status: Closed
- Track gauge: 1,000 mm (3 ft 3 3/8 in)
- Propulsion system: Electric

Simferopol Tramway (Russian: Симферопольский трамвай Ukrainian: Сімферопольський трамвай) was the part of the public transportation system that worked in Simferopol, the administrative center of the Taurida Governorate of the Russian Empire. The tram system had a narrow rail gauge of 1,000 mm (3 ft 3 3/8 in).

== History ==
The system was built by Belgian «Simferopol Electric Tramway and Lighting Anonimous Society». The first test drives were carried out in June 1914. The official opening of the line was 13 August 1914. This line combined center with the railway station. In October 1914, in the city were three tram lines. During World War I and the Civil War, virtually no trams plied. Tram traffic was restored 12 March 1924. In 1941, the depot was more than 50 cars. In November 1941, suspended plying of trams. During the Second World War was blown up tram depot burned 12 cars, dismantled the entire rail network and more than 100 steel poles. After the war, the movement was resumed in November 1944. The reconstruction of the tram network was completed in 1946 when four tram lines were working.

Since 1955, start of deliveries of trams from the GDR. In 1957, most of the passengers were transported in the history of trams in Simferopol - 40 million. Since 1 January 1961, the city had 101 trams in the 57 railcars.

The last tram line closed on 1 December 1970. The reason for the liquidation of trams was no spare parts. The maximum length of tram routes in the city was 33 km.

== Routes ==
- Route No. 1 «Railway Station — Center — Nizhnehospitalnaya Street»
- Route No. 2 «Bitakskaya Street — Zastava»
- Route No. 3 «Hospital Place — Nizhnehospitalnaya Street»
- Route No. 4 «Railway Station — Oboronnaya Street»
