= Metre-gauge railway =

Railway track gauge (1000 mm)

Metre-gauge railways (US: meter-gauge railways) are narrow-gauge railways with track gauge of 1,000 mm (3 ft 3 3/8 in) or 1 metre.

Metre gauge is used in around 95,000 kilometres (59,000 mi) of tracks around the world. It was used by several European colonial powers including France, Britain and Germany in their colonies. In Europe, large metre-gauge networks remain in use in Switzerland, Spain and many European towns with urban trams, but most metre-gauge local railways in France, Germany and Belgium closed down in the mid-20th century, although some still remain. With the revival of urban rail transport, metre-gauge light metros were built in some cities. The slightly-wider 1,009 mm (3 ft 3 23/32 in) gauge is used in Sofia, Bulgaria. Another similar gauge is 3 ft 6 in (1,067 mm).

== Examples of metre-gauge ==
Country/territory	Railway
Argentina	11,080 km (6,880 mi): Ferrocarril General Manuel Belgrano
Austria	Innsbruck Tramway (operating); Gmunden Tramway (operating); Stubaitalbahn (operating); Achenseebahn (operating); Schlossbergbahn (Graz) (operating)
Bangladesh	1,830 km (1,140 mi), out of which 365 km (227 mi) are dual gauge with 1,676 mm (5 ft 6 in) gauge
Belgium	National Company of Light Railways — ceased operations, except: Belgian Coast Tram (operating); Charleroi Light Metro (operating); Several "museum lines" kept in operation for tourists by volunteers: tramway to the Caves of Han-sur-Lesse, Tramway touristique de l'Aisne, etc.; Antwerp Tram (operating); Ghent Tram (operating)
Benin	578 km (359 mi): National rail network.
Bolivia	3,600 km (2,200 mi): National rail network.
Brazil	23,489 km (14,595 mi): Mostly in cargo railways, including E.F Vitoria-Minas Passenger/Cargo Line and R.R. (operating); Fortaleza Metro (operating); Teresina Metro (operating); Rio de Janeiro Urban Rails - Vila Inhomirim and Guapimirim lines (operating)
Bulgaria	154 km (96 mi) of 1,009 mm (3 ft 3 23/32 in) gauge: Entire Sofia Tramway system, except for three lines that use standard gauge. (operating)
Burkina Faso	Abidjan-Ouagadougou railway (operating)
Burma	3,200 kilometres (2,000 mi) 160 kilometres (99 mi): Burmese railways, except for the Burma Mines Railway.
Cambodia	612 km (380 mi)
Cameroon	1,104 km (686 mi)
Chile	2,923 km (1,816 mi): Empresa de los Ferrocarriles del Estado (Ferronor), Ferrocarril de Antofagasta a Bolivia, Arica–La Paz railway.
China	Kunhe Railway (formerly the Yunnan–Vietnam Railway) (operating).; Dujiangyan–Siguniangshan mountain railway [zh] (in construction).; Former Datong–Puzhou railway and Zhengding-Taiyuan Railway. All regauged to standard gauge.
Croatia	Zagreb Tramway (operating); Osijek tram system (operating)
Czech Republic	Like other Sudeten cities, the trams of Liberec used metre gauge in the past. All lines however have been rebuilt to standard gauge.
Democratic Republic of the Congo	Several metre gauge railways
Denmark	See Metre gauge railways in Denmark and Narrow-gauge railways in Denmark. A few local railways. Only one remains, but regauged to standard gauge.: Århus tramway (closed), Danish Tramway Museum.; See also: List of town tramway systems in Denmark, List of heritage railways, List of railway museums, History of rail transport in Denmark, and Rail transport in Denmark
Egypt	Cairo tram (ceased operations)
Finland	Helsinki tram (operating)
France	Historically used in many local and regional railways, only a few of which remain today.: Blanc-Argent Railway, from Salbris to Valençay (operating); Chemins de fer de la Provence (Train des pignes) (operating); Chemins de fer de la Corse (2 operating lines); Chemin de fer de La Mure (operating); Panoramique des Dômes (operating); Lille tramway (operating); Saint-Étienne tramway (operating); Chemins de fer départementaux du Finistère (closed in 1946); Chemin de fer de la Baie de Somme (operating); Ligne de Cerdagne, Le Petit Train Jaune (Little Yellow Train), operating in the French Pyrenees.; Saint-Gervais–Vallorcine railway through Chamonix (operating); Mont Blanc tramway (operating); Chemin de fer du Montenvers (operating); Guignicourt–Rethel railway
Germany	Trams in Augsburg; Trams in Bad Schandau; Bielefeld Stadtbahn; Trams in Bochum/Gelsenkirchen; Trams in Brandenburg; Trams in Cottbus; Trams in Darmstadt; Erfurt Stadtbahn; Trams in Essen; Trams in Frankfurt (Oder); Trams in Freiburg im Breisgau; Trams in Görlitz; Trams in Gotha; Trams in Halberstadt; Trams in Halle (Saale); Trams in Heidelberg; Trams in Jena; Trams in Krefeld; Trams in Mainz; Trams in Mannheim/Ludwigshafen; Trams in Mülheim/Oberhausen; Trams in Naumburg (Saale); Trams in Nordhausen; Trams in Plauen; Trams in Schöneiche; Trams in Ulm; Trams in Würzburg; Trams in Zwickau; Harzer Schmalspurbahnen (operating); Bavarian Zugspitzbahn (operating)
Greece	The Piraeus, Athens and Peloponnese Railways used to be the largest metre-gauge network in Europe but are now largely abandoned. Only the suburban rail service of Patras, and the Olympia–Katakolo tourist railway still use the network. An undergoing project of Messinian Suburban Railway will bring back at least 40 kilometers of the unused metre gauge railway
Hungary	Szombathely tram (1897-1974); Sopron tram (1900-1923); Borsodnádasd record factory (defunct)
India	Nilgiri Mountain Railway (operating) Mailani - Nanpara Railway (operating)
Iraq	Mesopotamian Railways
Israel	Sections of 1,000 mm (3 ft 3 3/8 in) railways, later converted to 1,050 mm (3 ft 5 11/32 in) or 1,435 mm (4 ft 8 1/2 in) gauge
Italy	Trento–Malè–Marilleva railway, owned by Trentino Trasporti (operating); Ferrovia Genova–Casella (operating); Domodossola–Locarno international railway (operating); Trieste–Opicina tramway (operating); Rittnerbahn-ferrovia del Renon tramway (operating); Laas-Lasa marble quarry railway (operating); Bernina railway (crosses into Switzerland) (UNESCO World Heritage Site status shared with Albula Railway in Switzerland) (operating)
Ivory Coast	Abidjan-Ouagadougou railway (operating)
Kenya	Kenya Railway run by Kenya Railways Corporation. Metre gauge link from Nairobi Standard Gauge station to city centre (operating)
Laos	A 3.5 km extension of the metre-gauge State Railway of Thailand network across the border into Laos
Latvia	Liepāja tramway (operating)
Madagascar	875 km (544 mi). There are two unconnected systems operated by Madarail
Malaysia	Keretapi Tanah Melayu (Malayan Railway) - KTM Intercity, KTM ETS and KTM Komuter; Sabah State Railway; Penang Hill Railway
Mali	641 km (398 mi) Dakar–Niger Railway
Malta	Malta Railway
Morocco	Several industrial railways in former Spanish Morocco
New Zealand	Wellington Cable Car (operating)
Norway	Trondheim Tramway (operating); Fløibanen (operating); Thamshavn Line (operating as a museum railway)
Pakistan	Mirpur Khas–Nawabshah Railway (defunct); One section of Hyderabad–Khokhrapar Branch Line (converted to broad gauge)
Poland	Trams in Bydgoszcz (operating); Trams in Toruń (operating); there are plans to interconnect both cities' systems; Trams in Elbląg (operating); Tramways in Grudziądz (operating); Trams in Łódź (including suburban lines) (operating); Trams in Olsztyn (defunct 1965, newly-built system in 2015 is standard gauge); Gryficka Kolej Wąskotorowa (operating as a tourist railway); Koszalińska Kolej Wąskotorowa (operating as a tourist railway); Piaseczyńska Kolej Wąskotorowa (operating as a tourist railway)
Portugal	Several mainly mountainous branch lines, mostly abandoned in the 1990s, never fully interconnected — connected to the REFER network by means of shared stations and some dual-gauge stretches. Metro de Mirandela and Vouga line remain in use. Other metric networks include Funchal rack railway (defunct in 1943), Coimbra trams (defunct in 1980), and Sintra trams.
Puerto Rico	Full network of Puerto Rican 1000mm railways in 1920: 654 km (406 mi): American Railroad Company – 417 km (259 mi), (1891-c.1957) (defunct). After 1957, some tracks of American Railroad Company were acquired by Land Authority of Puerto Rico for sugar cane hauling: the Arecibo network (Central Cambalache: 1957-1981) (defunct) and the Aguada-Mayagüez line (Central Coloso: 1957-c.1970) (defunct); Fajardo Development Company – 59.9 km (37.2 mi) for sugar cane hauling between Carolina to Naguabo in eastern Puerto Rico (1902-1977) (defunct); Ferrocarril Histórico de Puerto Rico, Fajardo – 7.4 km (4.6 mi) tracks of Central Fajardo Railroad from Fajardo outskirts to El Yunque foothills used as right-of-way for this heritage railroad since 1971. Destroyed by Fajardo River flooding in 1974 (defunct); Ponce and Guayama Railroad – 97 km (60 mi) for sugar cane hauling between Ponce to Arroyo in southern Puerto Rico (1904-1990) (defunct); Train of the South – 6.4 km (4.0 mi) tracks of Ponce and Guayama Railroad from Guayama to Arroyo used as right-of-way for this heritage railroad between 1984-1988 and reused between 1996-2005 (defunct); Caguas Tramway (Río Piedras-Caguas Railway) – 28 km (17 mi) (1908-1928) (defunct); Mayagüez Tramway (1915-1927) (defunct); Ponce Tramway (1902-1927) (defunct)
Romania	Arad tram (operating); Iaşi tram (operating); Sibiu tram (operating); Was used in Galaţi tram until fully replaced by standard gauge in 1975.
Russia	Kaliningrad tramway (operating); Pyatigorsk tramway (operating)
Senegal	Dakar–Niger Railway – 1,287 km (800 mi)
Serbia	Belgrade Tram (operating)
Singapore	Singapore span of the Keretapi Tanah Melayu (Malayan Railway) for shuttle service.
Slovakia	Bratislava trams/streetcars (operating); Tatra Electric Railway (Tatranské elektrické železnice), a mountain railroad and a rack railway in the area of the High Tatras. (operating); Košice Children's Heritage Railway in Košice. (operating)
Spain	Euskotren Trena inter-city, commuter & metro lines and Euskotren Tranbia (Bilbao and Vitoria-Gasteiz) tram lines; Renfe lines in north-west Spain, including the Transcantábrico (operating); FGC Llobregat–Anoia Line and Barcelona Metro line 8; Bilbao Metro (operating); Cercanías Madrid C-9 (Cercedilla–Cotos) (operating); Cercanías Murcia/Alicante C-4 (Cartagena–Los Nietos) (operating); Palma de Mallorca Metro (operating); Valencia Metro (operating); Ferrocarrils de la Generalitat Valenciana (operating)
Sweden	Skansens bergbana (operating)
Switzerland	See also: List of funiculars in Switzerland: Albula Railway and Bernina railway (crosses into Italy). These railways share UNESCO World Heritage Site status as part of the Rhaetian Railway (operating); Appenzell–St. Gallen–Trogen railway, Altstätten–Gais railway line, Gossau–Wasserauen railway line, runs in the cantons of St. Gallen, Appenzell Innerrhoden and Appenzell Ausserrhoden (operating); Dolderbahn, Funicular railway in Zurich converted into a rack railway and extended in the early 1970s. (operating); Forchbahn, runs as a tram in Zürich city and as a train outside the city (operating); Zentralbahn, merged with Luzern Stans Engelbergbahn, Brünigbahn and Meiringen Innertkirchen Bahn (operating); Matterhorn Gotthard Bahn, (operating); Chemins de fer du Jura, (operating); La Chaux-de-Fonds–Glovelier line, (operating); La Chaux-de-Fonds–Les Ponts-de-Martel railway, (operating); Saignelégier–La Chaux-de-Fonds Railway, (operating); Le Locle–Les Brenets line, (operating); Trams in Neuchâtel, (operating); Centovalli railway, (operating); Lugano–Ponte Tresa Railway, (operating); Martigny–Châtelard Railway, (operating); Chemin de fer Nyon-St-Cergue-Morez, (operating); Chemin de fer Bière-Apples-Morges, (operating); Chemin de fer Yverdon–Ste-Croix, (operating); Chemin de fer Lausanne–Echallens–Bercher, (operating); Montreux–Lenk im Simmental line, (operating); Transports Publics du Chablais, (operating); Frauenfeld-Wil-Bahn, (operating); Regionalverkehr Bern-Solothurn, (operating); Biel–Täuffelen–Ins railway, (operating); Trams in Basel, (operating); Baselland Transport, (operating); Trams in Bern, (operating); Trams in Geneva, (operating); Berner Oberlandbahn, (operating); Montreux–Lenk im Simmental line, (operating); Gornergratbahn, (operating); Trams in Zürich, trams in Zürich city and Glattal (operating); Bienne–Evilard Funicular
Tanzania	Tanzania Railways Corporation – about 2,600 km (1,600 mi) (break of gauge with 3 ft 6 in (1,067 mm) TAZARA Railway)
Thailand	State Railway of Thailand, 4,346 km (2,700 mi).
Togo	568 km (353 mi).
Tunisia	1,674 km (1,040 mi) used along with standard gauge (471 km (293 mi))
Turkey	T3 Line of Burtram (operating); EsTram (operating); Istanbul nostalgic tramways (operating)
Uganda	Uganda Railway run by Uganda Railways Corporation. Metre gauge link from Malaba to Kampala city centre (operating, under rehabilitation); Metre gauge link from Malaba to Tororo (operating); Metre gauge link from Tororo - Gulu - Pakwach to Tororo (under rehabilitation)
Ukraine	Lviv tram (operating); Vinnytsia Tramway (operating); Zhytomyr tram (operating)
United Kingdom	Waltham Iron Ore Tramway; Wellingborough Tramway; Davington Light Railway; Cliff Quarry Mineral Railway. Apparently the first metre-gauge railway in the world. Now occupied by the standard gauge Crich Tramway.; Butts Tramway, Butts Extension Tramway, Lindal Moor Tramway, Eure Pits Tramway (coherent group of lines serving iron ore mines near Dalton-in-Furness, Cumbria, built 1849–1862)
United States	Sierra Lumber Company Railroad. A meter-gauge railway built in 1881 from Lyonsville, California into the redwood forests. It used three steam locomotives and worked until 1907.; Honda Express at Six Flags Magic Mountain; Red Car Trolley (located in Disney California Adventure) (defunct - park still operating)
Uzbekistan	Trams in Tashkent, switched to 1520 mm gauge by 1968
Vietnam	Vietnam Railways and KunHe Railway

== See also ==
- Italian metre gauge
- Narrow-gauge railways
