= List of town tramway systems in Germany =

This is a list of town tramway systems in Germany by Land. It includes all tram systems, past and present. Cities with currently operating systems, and those systems themselves, are indicated in bold and blue background colored rows. Those tram systems that operated on other than standard gauge track (where known) are indicated in the 'Notes' column.

== Baden-Württemberg ==
Name of System	Location	Traction Type	Date (From)	Date (To)	Notes
	Baden-Baden	Electric	24 Jan 1910	28 Feb 1951	Gauge: 1,000 mm (3 ft 3 3/8 in)
	Esslingen	Electric	24 May 1912	7 Jul 1944	Gauge: 1,000 mm (3 ft 3 3/8 in)
	Esslingen – Nellingen – Denkendorf	Electric	19 Dec 1926	28 Feb 1978	Gauge: 1,000 mm (3 ft 3 3/8 in)
Trams in Freiburg im Breisgau	**Freiburg im Breisgau**	Electric	14 Oct 1901		Gauge: 1,000 mm (3 ft 3 3/8 in)
	**Heidelberg**	Horse	13 May 1885	7 Oct 1902	Gauge: 1,000 mm (3 ft 3 3/8 in)
	**Heidelberg**	Electric	17 Mar 1903		Gauge: 1,000 mm (3 ft 3 3/8 in); See also: Mannheim.
	Heidelberg – Schwetzingen		?	4 Jan 1974	
	Schwetzingen – Ketsch	Electric	12 Dec 1910	31 Mar 1938	Gauge: 1,000 mm (3 ft 3 3/8 in)
	Walldorf (in Baden)	Horse	22 Feb 1902	21 Feb 1907	Gauge: 1,000 mm (3 ft 3 3/8 in)
	Walldorf (in Baden)	Electric	22 Feb 1907	1 Aug 1954	Gauge: 1,000 mm (3 ft 3 3/8 in); Separate undertaking to 3 September 1945.
	Wiesloch	Horse	1 Sep 1886	4 Jul 1901	Gauge: 1,000 mm (3 ft 3 3/8 in)
	Heidelberg – Wiesloch	Electric	24 Jul 1901	16 Jun 1973	
	**Heilbronn (am Neckar)**	Electric	29 May 1897	1 Apr 1955	Original tramway closed in 1955.
	**Heilbronn (am Neckar)**	Electric	2001		Heilbronn Stadtbahn: segment reopened as part of Karlsruhe Stadtbahn **light rail** regional system.
Trams in Karlsruhe	**Karlsruhe**	Horse	21 Jan 1877	19 Mar 1900	
Trams in Karlsruhe	**Karlsruhe**	Steam	16 Jul 1881	19 Mar 1900	
Trams in Karlsruhe	**Karlsruhe**	Accumulator (storage battery)	10 Feb 1900	1903	
Trams in Karlsruhe	**Karlsruhe**	Electric	10 Feb 1900		
Karlsruhe Stadtbahn	**Karlsruhe**	Electric	25 Sep 1992		**Light rail**
Alb Valley Railway	Karlsruhe – Ettlingen – Bad Herrenalb	Steam	1 Dec 1897	1911	
Alb Valley Railway	Karlsruhe – Ettlingen – Bad Herrenalb	Electric	1 Dec 1898		
Alb Valley Railway	Karlsruhe – Ettlingen		1 Dec 1897		
Alb Valley Railway	Ettlingen – Bad Herrenalb		2 Jul 1898		Opened in stages, completed 2 July 1898.
Alb Valley Railway	Branch Busenbach – Ittersbach		10 Apr 1899		
	Lörrach	Electric	16 Nov 1919	31 Aug 1967	Worked by tramcars hired from Basel Switzerland tramway. Operation suspended 1 September 1939 – 11 May 1947 because of closure of border.
Trams in Mannheim/Ludwigshafen	**Mannheim**	Horse	2 Jun 1878	22 May 1902	
Trams in Mannheim/Ludwigshafen	**Mannheim**	Steam	6 May 1884	23 Mar 1914	
Trams in Mannheim/Ludwigshafen	**Mannheim**	Electric	10 Dec 1900		Gauge: 1,000 mm (3 ft 3 3/8 in); Operated jointly with Ludwigshafen system (q.v.). See also Heidelberg.
Upper Rhine Railway Company (OGE)	**Mannheim – Heidelberg**	Steam	12 Dec 1887	31 Aug 1956	
Upper Rhine Railway Company (OGE)	**Mannheim – Heidelberg**	Electric	10 Dec 1900		Gauge: 1,000 mm (3 ft 3 3/8 in)
Upper Rhine Railway Company (OGE)	**Mannheim – Heidelberg**				Opened 1892. Electrified 1928–1929.
Upper Rhine Railway Company (OGE)	**Mannheim – Weinheim**				Opened 1887; electrified 1915.
Upper Rhine Railway Company (OGE)	**Heidelberg – Weinheim**				Gauge: 1,000 mm (3 ft 3 3/8 in); Opened 1890; electrified 1949–1956.
	Müllheim	Steam	15 Feb 1896	1913	Gauge: 1,000 mm (3 ft 3 3/8 in)
	Müllheim	Electric	7 Apr 1914	22 May 1955	Gauge: 1,000 mm (3 ft 3 3/8 in)
	Müllheim – Badenweiler			22 May 1955	
	Pforzheim	Electric	1 Dec 1911	10 Oct 1964	Gauge: 1,000 mm (3 ft 3 3/8 in)
	Ravensburg – Weingarten – Baienfurt	Steam	6 Jan 1888	12 Sep 1911	Gauge: 1,000 mm (3 ft 3 3/8 in)
	Ravensburg – Weingarten – Baienfurt	Electric	1 Sep 1910	1 Jul 1959	Gauge: 1,000 mm (3 ft 3 3/8 in)
	Reutlingen	Steam	1 Nov 1899	24 Jul 1912	Gauge: 1,000 mm (3 ft 3 3/8 in)
	Reutlingen	Electric	24 Jul 1912	19 Oct 1974	Gauge: 1,000 mm (3 ft 3 3/8 in)
	**Stuttgart**	Horse	28 Jul 1868	28 Nov 1896	
	**Stuttgart**	Electric	26 Sep 1895		Gauge: 1,000 mm (3 ft 3 3/8 in); First tunnel segment opened 1966.
Stuttgart Stadtbahn	**Stuttgart**	Electric	28 Sep 1985		**Light rail**. Stuttgart Stadtbahn operates on standard gauge, after the previous tram system was converted from metre gauge.
	**Bad Cannstatt**	Electric	20 Jul 1899		Separate undertaking to 1 January 1919.
	**Feuerbach**	Electric	30 Dec 1926		Separate undertaking to 1 January 1934.
	**Rack tramway**	Steam	23 Aug 1884	1907	
	**Rack tramway**	Electric	1 May 1904		
Trams in Ulm	**Ulm (an der Donau)**	Electric	15 May 1897		Gauge: 1,000 mm (3 ft 3 3/8 in)

== Bavaria (Bayern) ==
Name of System	Location	Traction Type	Date (From)	Date (To)	Notes
Trams in Augsburg	**Augsburg**	Horse	8 May 1881	31 Aug 1898	
Trams in Augsburg	**Augsburg**	Steam	12 Sept 1886	15 June 1887	
Trams in Augsburg	**Augsburg**	Electric	1 Sep 1898		Gauge: 1,000 mm (3 ft 3 3/8 in)
	Bamberg	Electric	1 Nov 1897	10 June 1922	Gauge: 1,000 mm (3 ft 3 3/8 in)
	Hof (an der Saale)	Electric	5 Aug 1901	14 Nov 1922	Gauge: 1,000 mm (3 ft 3 3/8 in)
	Ingolstadt (an der Donau)	Horse	10 Nov 1878	3 Mar 1921	
	Ingolstadt (an der Donau)	(Electric)			Gauge: 1,000 mm (3 ft 3 3/8 in); Construction on tramway started, but not completed (c.1914).
	Landshut (in Bayern)	Horse	1 July 1902	1913	Gauge: 1,000 mm (3 ft 3 3/8 in)
	Landshut (in Bayern)	Electric	15 Jan 1913	18 Mar 1945	Gauge: 1,000 mm (3 ft 3 3/8 in); Closed because of war damage.
Trams in Munich (owned by MVG)	**Munich (München)**	Horse	21 Oct 1876	1 Nov 1900	
Trams in Munich (owned by MVG)	**Munich (München)**	Steam	9 Jun 1883	15 Jul 1900	
Trams in Munich (owned by MVG)	**Munich (München)**	Accumulator (storage battery)	1 Jul 1886	17 Jul 1895	
Trams in Munich (owned by MVG)	**Munich (München)**	Electric	23 Jun 1895		
Trams in Nuremberg	**Nuremberg (Nürnberg)**	Horse	25 Aug 1881	20 Jul 1898	
Trams in Nuremberg	**Nuremberg (Nürnberg)**	Electric	7 May 1896		Gauge: 1,432 mm (4 ft 8 3/8 in) (formerly, since converted to standard gauge)
	Nuremberg – Fürth	Steam	7 Dec 1835	31 Oct 1922	Bayerische Ludwigsbahn, Nürnberg – Fürth, first railway in Germany.
	Nuremberg – Fürth	Electric	?	21 Jun 1981	Express tramway, built on alignment of closed railway (Ludwigsbahn). Closed, together with remaining tramway lines in Fürth, because of U-Bahn (metro) construction.
	Regensburg	Electric	21 Apr 1903	1 Aug 1964	Gauge: 1,000 mm (3 ft 3 3/8 in)
	Schweinfurt	Horse	5 May 1895	31 Jan 1921	Gauge: 1,000 mm (3 ft 3 3/8 in)
Trams in Würzburg	**Würzburg**	Horse	8 Apr 1892	4 Oct 1900	Gauge: 1,000 mm (3 ft 3 3/8 in)
Trams in Würzburg	**Würzburg**	Electric	30 Jun 1900; 18 Sep 1924	20 Apr 1920	Gauge: 1,000 mm (3 ft 3 3/8 in); Reopened as a new undertaking (in 1924); see also: Trams in Würzburg.

== Berlin ==
Name of System	Location	Traction Type	Date (From)	Date (To)	Notes
Trams in Berlin (owned by BVG)	**Berlin**	Horse	22 Jun 1865	8 Dec 1907	
Trams in Berlin (owned by BVG)	**Berlin**	Steam	5 May 1886	1919	
Trams in Berlin (owned by BVG)	**Berlin**	Accumulator (storage battery)	8 Feb 1895	1902	
Trams in Berlin (owned by BVG)	**Berlin**	Electric	16 May 1881		Note: Berlin tramway divided into East Berlin and West Berlin systems from 16 January 1953. West Berlin tramway lines replaced by motorbus starting from 1954, with final West Berlin tram closure on 2 October 1967. (See Trams in Berlin.) Following German reunification, some tramlines have returned to the western part of the city.
	Adlershof – Altglienicke	Electric	5 Jun 1909	31 Dec 1992	Separate tram undertaking to 16 April 1921.
	**Buchholz**	Horse	9 Jul 1904	8 Dec 1907	
	**Buchholz**	Electric	8 Dec 1907		Separate tram undertaking to 22 July 1907.
	Heiligensee an der Havel	Electric	29 May 1913	1 Jun 1958	Separate tram undertaking to 3 December 1920.
	**Köpenick (Cöpenick)**	Horse	18 Oct 1882	11 Aug 1903	
	**Köpenick (Cöpenick)**	Electric	11 Aug 1903		Separate tram undertaking to 1 October 1920.
	Schmöckwitz – Grünau	Petrol	9 Mar 1912	27 July 1912	The planned overhead line was not set up due to public protests regarding a ruined view of the waterfront. Higher than expected passenger numbers caused the management to change quickly its mind and to commission AEG with the installation of the overhead line.
	Schmöckwitz – Grünau	Electric	27 Jul 1912		Separate tram undertaking to 30 September 1924.
	Spandau	Horse	5 Jun 1892	17 Mar 1896	Gauge: 1,000 mm (3 ft 3 3/8 in)
	Spandau	Electric	18 Mar 1896	27 Oct 1907	Gauge: 1,000 mm (3 ft 3 3/8 in); Converted to standard gauge.
	Spandau	Electric	28 Oct 1907	2 Oct 1967	Converted from metre gauge.
	Spandau	Electric	18 Mar 1896	2 Oct 1967	Separate undertaking by AEG to 1 August 1920.
	Spandau – Nonnendamm	Electric	30 Sep 1908	2 Oct 1967	
	Spandau West – Hennigsdorf	Petrol	1 Aug 1923	11 Nov 1929	
	Spandau West – Hennigsdorf	Electric	11 Nov 1929	_ Apr 1945	
Grunewaldbahn	Steglitz	Electric	3 Dec 1905	2 May 1963	
	Berlin-Lichterfelde – Steglitz – Südende station – Mariendorf line	Electric	16 May 1881	14 Feb 1930	Incorporated Gross-Lichterfelde Tramway opened 1881 by Siemens & Halske, as world's first electric tramway.
	Berlin-Lichterfelde – Teltow – Stahnsdorf – Kleinmachnow (Canal lock)	Steam	1 Jul 1888	30 Mar 1907	
	Berlin-Lichterfelde – Teltow – Stahnsdorf – Kleinmachnow (Canal lock)	Electric	30 Mar 1907	2 May 1966	

== Brandenburg ==
Name of System	Location	Traction Type	Date (From)	Date (To)	Notes
Trams in Brandenburg an der Havel	**Brandenburg (an der Havel)**	Horse	1 Oct 1897	20 Apr 1911	Gauge: 1,000 mm (3 ft 3 3/8 in)
Trams in Brandenburg an der Havel	**Brandenburg (an der Havel)**	Electric	1 Apr 1911		Gauge: 1,000 mm (3 ft 3 3/8 in)
	Plaue (an der Havel)	Electric	24 Dec 1912	28 Sep 2002	Gauge: 1,000 mm (3 ft 3 3/8 in); Separate tram undertaking to 1 October 1952.
Trams in Cottbus	**Cottbus (Chóśebuz)**	Electric	8 Jul 1903		Gauge: 1,000 mm (3 ft 3 3/8 in)
	Eberswalde	Electric	1 Sep 1910	3 Nov 1940	
Trams in Frankfurt (Oder)	**Frankfurt an der Oder**	Electric	23 Jan 1898		Gauge: 1,000 mm (3 ft 3 3/8 in); See also: Słubice, List of town tramway systems in Poland.
	Guben	Electric	24 Feb 1904	8 Jun 1938	Gauge: 1,000 mm (3 ft 3 3/8 in); See also: Gubin, List of town tramway systems in Poland.
	Jüterbog	Horse	21 Mar 1897	29 Jul 1928	Gauge: 1,000 mm (3 ft 3 3/8 in)
	Küstrin	Electric	16 May 1927	30 Jan 1945	Gauge: 1,000 mm (3 ft 3 3/8 in); See also: Kostrzyn nad Odrą;, List of town tramway systems in Poland.
Trams in Potsdam (owned by ViP)	**Potsdam**	Horse	11 May 1880	1 Sep 1907	
Trams in Potsdam (owned by ViP)	**Potsdam**	Electric	2 Sep 1907		
	**Schöneiche (bei Berlin)**	Petrol	28 Aug 1910	30 May 1914	Gauge: 1,000 mm (3 ft 3 3/8 in)
	**Schöneiche (bei Berlin)**	Electric	30 May 1914		Gauge: 1,000 mm (3 ft 3 3/8 in)
Strausberg Railway	**Strausberg**	Steam	17 Aug 1893	15 Mar 1921	
Strausberg Railway	**Strausberg**	Electric	18 Mar 1921		
	Werder (an der Havel)	Horse	27 Jul 1895	7 Aug 1926	Gauge: 1,000 mm (3 ft 3 3/8 in)
Woltersdorf Tramway	**Woltersdorf (bei Berlin)**	Electric	17 May 1913		

== Bremen ==
Name of System	Location	Traction Type	Date (From)	Date (To)	Notes
Trams in Bremen	**Bremen**	Horse	4 Jun 1875	31 Oct 1911	
Trams in Bremen	**Bremen**	Electric	22 Jun 1890		
	Bremerhaven	Horse	26 Jun 1881	28 Aug 1908	
	Bremerhaven	Accumulator (storage battery)	21 Aug 1898	31 Jul 1908	
	Bremerhaven	Electric	4 Jun 1908	30 Jul 1982	

== Hamburg ==
Name of System	Location	Traction Type	Date (From)	Date (To)	Notes
Trams in Hamburg	Hamburg	Horse	16 Aug 1866	18 Dec 1922	
Trams in Hamburg	Hamburg	Steam	13 May 1878	22 Jun 1897	
Trams in Hamburg	Hamburg	Electric	5 Mar 1894	1 Oct 1978	Hamburg is the only major German city with only an U-Bahn (Hamburg U-Bahn), but no extant tram or light rail system. The Hamburg tram network was one of oldest and largest in Germany and largest closed system.
	Hamburg-Harburg	Electric	30 Sep 1899	24 Sep 1975	
	Alt-Rahlstedt – Volksdorf	Electric	30 Oct 1906	15 Apr 1923	Town tramway service on local railway (kleinbahn).
	Altona – Blankenese	Electric	26 Aug 1899	9 Nov 1921	

== Hessen ==
Name of System	Location	Traction Type	Date (From)	Date (To)	Notes
	Bad Homburg (vor der Höhe)	Electric	26 Jul 1899	31 Jul 1935	Served by line of Frankfurt am Main system to 1971 (this line was upgraded to the Frankfurt U-Bahn line that serves Bad Homburg).
Trams in Darmstadt	**Darmstadt**	Horse	25 Aug 1886	31 Mar 1922	Gauge: 1,000 mm (3 ft 3 3/8 in)
Trams in Darmstadt	**Darmstadt**	Electric	24 Nov 1897		Gauge: 1,000 mm (3 ft 3 3/8 in)
	Eltville – Schlangenbad	Steam	20 Jun 1895	17 Mar 1933	Gauge: 1,000 mm (3 ft 3 3/8 in)
Trams in Frankfurt am Main	**Frankfurt am Main**	Horse	19 May 1872	17 Jun 1904	
Trams in Frankfurt am Main	**Frankfurt am Main**	Steam	1 Sep 1888	13 Jul 1929	
Trams in Frankfurt am Main	**Frankfurt am Main**	Accumulator (storage battery)	1 Jan 1897	9 Sep 1900	
Trams in Frankfurt am Main	**Frankfurt am Main**	Electric	18 Feb 1884		
	Offenbach am Main	Horse	10 Apr 1884	28 Oct 1906	
	Offenbach am Main	Electric	27 Oct 1906	3 Nov 1963.	Operated as part of Trams in Frankfurt, 31 March 1907 – 3 November 1963. Offenbach am Main served by line of Trams in Frankfurt to 1 June 1996.
	Gießen	Electric	20 Nov 1909	31 Mar 1953	
	Hanau	Electric	15 Jun 1908	18 Mar 1945	Closed because of war damage.
Trams in Kassel	**Kassel**	Steam	9 Jul 1877	10 May 1899	
Trams in Kassel	**Kassel**	Horse	27 Apr 1884	28 Feb 1899	
Trams in Kassel	**Kassel**	Electric	14 Dec 1898		See also: **Kassel RegioTram**.
	**Kassel – Wolfsanger**	Horse	24 Sep 1897	20 Oct 1911	
	**Kassel – Wolfsanger**	Electric	20 Oct 1911		
Herkulesbahn	Kassel – Palmenbad, Brasselsberg, Herkules, Hohes Gras	Electric	27 Apr 1903	12 Apr 1966	Gauge: 1,000 mm (3 ft 3 3/8 in)
	Marburg (an der Lahn)	Horse	1 Oct 1903	10 Oct 1911	Gauge: 1,000 mm (3 ft 3 3/8 in)
	Marburg (an der Lahn)	Electric	28 Nov 1911	17 May 1951	Gauge: 1,000 mm (3 ft 3 3/8 in)
	Wiesbaden	Horse	16 Aug 1875	14 Aug 1900	
	Wiesbaden	Steam	18 May 1889	27 Aug 1900	Gauge: 1,000 mm (3 ft 3 3/8 in)
	Wiesbaden	Electric	16 May 1896	30 Apr 1955	Gauge: 1,000 mm (3 ft 3 3/8 in); See also: Mainz in List of town tramway systems in Germany#Rhineland-Palatinate (Rheinland-Pfalz).

== Lower Saxony (Niedersachsen) ==
Name of System	Location	Traction Type	Date (From)	Date (To)	Notes
	Bad Pyrmont	Horse	1 Jun 1879	12 Mar 1925	Gauge: 1,000 mm (3 ft 3 3/8 in)
	Bückeburg – Bad Eilsen	Electric	1918	21 May 1966	
Trams in Braunschweig	**Braunschweig**	Horse	11 Oct 1879	24 Sep 1904	Gauge: 1,100 mm (3 ft 7 5/16 in)
Trams in Braunschweig	**Braunschweig**	Electric	28 Oct 1897		Gauge: 1,100 mm (3 ft 7 5/16 in)
	Celle	Electric	1 Nov 1907	2 June 1956	Gauge: 1,100 mm (3 ft 7 5/16 in)
	Cuxhaven	Petrol-electric (Benzolelektrisch)	6 Jul 1914	2 Aug 1914	
	Emden	Electric	23 Feb 1902	30 Apr 1953	Gauge: 1,000 mm (3 ft 3 3/8 in)
	Göttingen	(Electric)			Construction on tramway started, but not completed (1914).
	**Hanover**	Horse	16 Sep 1872	1897	
	**Hanover**	Accumulator (storage battery)	10 Sep 1895	20 Nov 1903	
	**Hanover**	Electric	19 May 1893		Converted to **light rail** – see: Hanover Stadtbahn
	Hanover – Hildesheim	Electric	22 Mar 1899	16 Aug 1959	
	Hildesheim	Electric	7 Aug 1905	22 Mar 1945	Closed because of war damage.
	Osnabrück	Electric	31 Jan 1906	29 May 1960	Gauge: 1,000 mm (3 ft 3 3/8 in)
	Wilhelmshaven	Electric	17 Mar 1913	30 Mar 1945	Closed because of war damage.

== Mecklenburg-Western Pomerania (Mecklenburg-Vorpommern) ==
Name of System	Location	Traction Type	Date (From)	Date (To)	Notes
Trams in Rostock	**Rostock**	Electric	16 Oct 1888		
Trams in Schwerin	**Schwerin**	Electric	1 Dec 1908		
	Stralsund	Electric	25 Mar 1900	7 Apr 1966	Gauge: 1,000 mm (3 ft 3 3/8 in)
	Warnemünde	Electric	1 July 1910	30 Apr 1945	Gauge: 1,000 mm (3 ft 3 3/8 in); Closed because of war damage.

== North Rhine-Westphalia (Nordrhein-Westfalen) ==
Name of System	Location	Traction Type	Date (From)	Date (To)	Notes
Trams in Aachen	Aachen	Horse	26 Dec 1880	10 Sep 1897	
Trams in Aachen	Aachen	Caustic soda (Natronmotor)	Jun 1884	Mar 1885	Gauge: 1,000 mm (3 ft 3 3/8 in)
Trams in Aachen	Aachen	Electric	15 Jul 1895	29 Sep 1974	Gauge: 1,000 mm (3 ft 3 3/8 in)
	Eschweiler	Electric	1897	6 Oct 1969	
	Stolberg	Electric	1898	8 Jan 1967	
	Bad Salzuflen	Horse	1 July 1909	1924	Gauge: 1,000 mm (3 ft 3 3/8 in)
	Bad Salzuflen – Schötmar	Horse	15 Jun 1912	1915	
Bielefeld Stadtbahn	**Bielefeld**	Electric	20 Dec 1900		Gauge: 1,000 mm (3 ft 3 3/8 in); Converted to **light rail** in 1991.
	Düren	Steam	1 Apr 1893	1913	
	Düren	Electric	20 Nov 1913	30 June 1965	
Dürener Kreisbahn	Düren – Nörvenich – Besenich	Electric	6 Oct 1908	30 April 1963	Nörvenich – Besenich closed 31 January 1960. Düren – Nörvenich closed 30 April 1963.
	Gummersbach	Electric	1 Oct 1915	4 Oct 1953	
	Herford	Steam	10 Aug 1900	10 May 1932	
	Herford	Electric	26 June 1930	22 April 1966	Gauge: 1,000 mm (3 ft 3 3/8 in)
	Kleve	Electric	1 Oct 1911	31 Mar 1962	
	Minden (in Westfalen)	Steam	7 Sep 1893	7 Dec 1920	Gauge: 1,000 mm (3 ft 3 3/8 in)
	Minden (in Westfalen)	Electric	9 Dec 1920	29 Dec 1959	Gauge: 1,000 mm (3 ft 3 3/8 in)
	Münster (in Westfalen)	Electric	14 July 1901	25 Nov 1954	Gauge: 1,000 mm (3 ft 3 3/8 in)
	Paderborn	Electric	11 Nov 1900	27 Sep 1963	
	Detmold	Electric	1 Mar 1900	15 Aug 1954	Gauge: 1,000 mm (3 ft 3 3/8 in); Separate undertaking to 1920.
	Plettenberg	Steam	25 May 1896	1 Jan 1959	Gauge: 1,000 mm (3 ft 3 3/8 in)
	Rees – Empel	Steam	5 Sep 1897	1914	Gauge: 1,000 mm (3 ft 3 3/8 in)
	Rees – Empel	Electric	28 Feb 1915	30 Apr 1966	
	Wesel – Rees – Emmerich (am Rhein)	Electric	25 May 1914	30 Apr 1966	
	Siegen	Electric	14 Nov 1904	31 Aug 1958	
	Siegen – Kreuztal	Electric	14 Nov 1904	29 May 1952	

=== Rhine-Ruhr (Rhein-Ruhr) ===
Ruhrgebiet (Ruhr Area) towns in geographic order, west to east:

Name of System	Location	Traction Type	Date (From)	Date (To)	Notes
	Moers	Electric	1 Oct 1908	25 Sep 1954	Gauge: 1,000 mm (3 ft 3 3/8 in)
	Homberg	Electric	1 Apr 1909	25 Sep 1954	Gauge: 1,000 mm (3 ft 3 3/8 in); Separate undertaking to 1 January 1925.
Homberg lines extended to:	Ruhrort		1913	Mar 1945	
Homberg also served by:	Düsseldorf (Rheinbahn) system		1911	20 Oct 1958	
	Krefeld system		1918	2 Nov 1962	
	Moers – Kamp – Rheinberg	Electric	12 Feb 1915	11 Oct 1952	
Trams in Duisburg	**Duisburg**	Horse	24 Dec 1881	31 Jul 1898	
Trams in Duisburg	**Duisburg**	Steam	22 Jul 1882	25 Dec 1897	
Trams in Duisburg	**Duisburg**	Electric	3 Aug 1897		First Stadtbahn-like tunnel segment opened 11 July 1992.
Duisburg lines extend to:	Ruhrort		24 Dec 1881		
	Hamborn		24 Feb 1898		
	Dinslaken		1 May 1900		
	Mülheim an der Ruhr		1912		
	**Oberhausen (im Rheinland)**	Electric	4 Apr 1897; 1 June 1996	13 Oct 1968	Connects with Trams in Mülheim/Oberhausen system.
Oberhausen lines connected with:	Essen system				Now closed.
	Mülheim an der Ruhr system				Closed, now reopened.
	Recklinghausen system				Now closed.
	Duisburg system				No track connection at Duisburg–Holten because of gauge difference. Now closed.
Oberhausen also served by:	Mülheim an der Ruhr system			4 Apr 1971	
Trams in Mülheim/Oberhausen	**Mülheim an der Ruhr**	Electric	8 Jul 1897		First Stadtbahn tunnel opened 3 November 1979 (served by Essen system – see Essen Stadtbahn). First tunnel segment for Mülheim system opened 27 April 1985.
Mülheim an der Ruhr lines connect with:	Essen system				
	Oberhausen system				
Trams in Essen	**Essen**	Electric	23 Aug 1893		First tunnel segment opened 5 October 1967. First Stadtbahn tunnel segment opened 29 May 1977.
Essen lines connect with:	Mülheim an der Ruhr system				
	Bochum – Gelsenkirchen system				
	Recklinghausen system				Now closed.
Trams in Bochum/Gelsenkirchen	**Bochum – Gelsenkirchen**	Electric	23 Nov 1894		Gauge: 1,000 mm (3 ft 3 3/8 in); First tunnel segment (Bochum) opened 26 May 1979. First tunnel segment (Gelsenkirchen) opened 1 September 1984.
Bochum – Gelsenkirchen lines extend to:	Herne		23 Nov 1894		
	Wanne-Eickel		20 Oct 1896		
	Gelsenkirchen		3 Nov 1895		
	Buer		24 June 1901		
	Horst		24 Jun 1901	18 Oct 1955	Now closed.
	Hattingen		1 Oct 1902		
	Witten		21 Dec 1900		
	Castrop-Rauxel		20 Dec 1909	8 May 1967	
	Hattingen	Electric	12 Mar 1914	30 June 1969	Operation suspended 24 October 1923 – 31 May 1924 because of Occupation of the Ruhr. Separate undertaking to 1 October 1932.
Bochum Stadtbahn	**Bochum – Herne**	Electric	2 Sep 1989		**Light rail**. Gauge: 1,435 mm (4 ft 8 1/2 in); First Stadtbahn tunnel segment (Bochum – Herne) opened 2 September 1989.
	Herne	Electric	20 Dec 1906	30 Sep 1959	Lines extended to Castrop-Rauxel, 15 July 1910 – 1 January 1952.
	Castrop-Rauxel				
Served by:	Bochum – Gelsenkirchen system		1909	8 May 1967	
	Herne system		15 Jul 1910	30 Sep 1959	
	Dortmund system		1 Nov 1910	1 July 1962	
	**Dortmund**	Horse	1 Jun 1881	1897	
	**Dortmund**	Steam	Feb 1892	1896	
	**Dortmund**	Electric	1 Mar 1894	1984*	* First tunnel segment opened 1983, and **converted to light rail** in 1984.
Dortmund Stadtbahn	**Dortmund**	Electric	1984		First tunnel segment opened 1983.
Dortmund lines extended to:	Recklinghausen (Henrichenburg)		1 Nov 1910	1 July 1958	Now closed.
	Castrop-Rauxel		1 Nov 1910	1 July 1962	Now closed.
	Unna		1906	31 Mar 1965	Now closed.
	Unna – Kamen – Werne	Electric	1 Aug 1909	15 Dec 1950	See also Dortmund.
	Hamm (im Westfalen)	Electric	20 Oct 1898	2 Apr 1961	Gauge: 1,000 mm (3 ft 3 3/8 in)

Name of System	Location	Traction Type	Date (From)	Date (To)	Notes
Vestische Straßenbahn	Recklinghausen	Electric	26 Feb 1898	30 Dec 1982	Connected with Essen and Bochum – Gelsenkirchen systems.
	Lines extended to:				
	Herten in Westfalen		10 May 1901	30 May 1981	
	Wanne-Eickel		10 May 1901	15 Nov 1975	
	Buer		1907	1 Oct 1980	
	Gladbeck		1909	31 Oct 1978	
	Horst		1909	31 Oct 1978	
	Bottrop		1910	27 Nov 1976	

Bezirksregierung Düsseldorf (Düsseldorf Region) and Bezirksregierung Arnsberg (Arnsberg Region) towns not tabulated above, in geographic order, west to east:

Name of System	Location	Traction Type	Date (From)	Date (To)	Notes
	Mönchengladbach	Horse	10 Aug 1881	14 Feb 1900	Gauge: 1,000 mm (3 ft 3 3/8 in)
	Mönchengladbach	Electric	15 Feb 1900	15 Mar 1969	Gauge: 1,000 mm (3 ft 3 3/8 in); Lines extended to Rheydt (10 August 1881 – 5 October 1968). Connected with Krefeld system.
	Rheydt	Horse	10 Aug 1881	14 Feb 1900	
	Rheydt	Electric	15 Feb 1900	31 Jan 1959	Gauge: 1,000 mm (3 ft 3 3/8 in)
Trams in Krefeld	**Krefeld**	Steam	3 May 1883	18 Sep 1901	Gauge: 1,000 mm (3 ft 3 3/8 in)
Trams in Krefeld	**Krefeld**	Horse	11 May 1883	6 Apr 1901	Gauge: 1,000 mm (3 ft 3 3/8 in)
Trams in Krefeld	**Krefeld**	Electric	30 Oct 1901		
Krefeld lines extended to:	Mönchengladbach (Neuwerk)		1910	8 Mar 1954	Now closed.
	Moers		1918	2 Nov 1962	Now closed.
Trams in Dusseldorf	**Düsseldorf**	Horse	6 Feb 1876	21 Jun 1900	
Trams in Dusseldorf	**Düsseldorf**	Steam	5 Aug 1901	30 Apr 1902	
Trams in Dusseldorf	**Düsseldorf**	Electric	27 Jan 1896		Lines extend to Neuss (27 December 1901 – ). First tunnel segment opened 4 October 1981. See also Rheinbahn; link to English-language page.
Düsseldorf Stadtbahn	**Düsseldorf**	Electric	6 Aug 1988		**Light rail**
	**Düsseldorf – Duisburg**	Electric	31 Oct 1899		New alignment opened 1 May 1926.
	Düsseldorf – Moers	Electric	1911	20 Oct 1958	
	**Düsseldorf – Krefeld**	Electric	15 Dec 1898		
	Mettmann	Electric	19 Jul 1909	17 May 1952	
	Düsseldorf (Benrath) – Solingen (Ohligs)	Electric	1899	15 Apr 1962	
	Düsseldorf (Benrath) – Wuppertal (Vohwinkel)	Steam	1899	1900	
	Düsseldorf (Benrath) – Wuppertal (Vohwinkel)	Electric	1900	7 May 1961	
	**Neuss**	Electric	24 Dec 1910	7 Aug 1971	Served by Trams in Düsseldorf system (21 December 1901 – )
	Solingen	Electric	1 July 1897	15 Nov 1959	Gauge: 1,000 mm (3 ft 3 3/8 in)
Solingen lines extended to:	Wuppertal (Vohwinkel)		1899	1 Oct 1958	Now closed.
	Solingen (Ohligs)		19 Nov 1898	1 Aug 1953	Now closed.
	Burg am der Wupper		1908	12 Oct 1959	Now closed.
	Remscheid	Electric	9 Jul 1893	10 Apr 1969	Gauge: 1,000 mm (3 ft 3 3/8 in)
Remscheid lines extended to:	Burg am der Wupper		12 Jul 1900	31 Jul 1960	Now closed.
	Wuppertal (Cronenfeld)		1901	30 Apr 1965	Worked jointly with Wuppertal system, now closed.
	Wuppertal	Horse	10 Apr 1874	5 Feb 1896	
	Wuppertal	Steam	28 May 1891	3 Apr 1903	
	Wuppertal	Electric	16 Apr 1894	30 May 1987	Towns of Barmen, Eberfeld and several neighboring towns were amalgamated at 1929 as Wuppertal.
Barmer Bergbahn	Rack tramway (zahnradbahn), Barmen – Toelleturm	Electric	16 Apr 1894	4 Jul 1959	Gauge: 1,000 mm (3 ft 3 3/8 in)
Wuppertal lines extended to:	Velbert – Essen (Werden)		15 Mar 1899	1 Feb 1952	Now closed.
	Essen (Steele)		24 Nov 1907	16 Apr 1954	Now closed.
	Sprockhövel – Hattingen		1907	30 Nov 1953	Now closed.
	Schwelm – Milspe		7 Aug 1896	3 May 1969	Schwelm – Milpse segment, 18 January 1907 – 28 September 1964. Now closed.
	Remscheid		15 Aug 1901	16 Jun 1954	Now closed.
	Solingen		4 Aug 1914	3 May 1969	Now closed.
	Wülfrath		19 Jul 1909	1 Jun 1952	Now closed.
	Mettmann		19 Jul 1909	17 May 1952	Now closed.
	Ennepetal (in Westfalen)	Electric	24 Feb 1907	31 Mar 1956	
Ennepetal lines extended:	Gevelsberg – Milspe - Voerde		24 Feb 1907	31 Mar 1956	Now closed.
	Gevelsberg – Haßlinghausen		19 May 1909	31 Mar 1956	Now closed.
	Hagen	Horse	13 Nov 1884	1 Jul 1898	Gauge: 1,000 mm (3 ft 3 3/8 in)
	Hagen	Accumulator (storage battery)	7 Jan 1895	20 Dec 1902	Gauge: 1,000 mm (3 ft 3 3/8 in)
	Hagen	Electric	18 Nov 1896	29 May 1976	Gauge: 1,000 mm (3 ft 3 3/8 in)
Hagen lines extended to:	Gevelsberg		12 Apr 1900	26 July 1953	Now closed.
	Hagen (Hohenlimburg)		8 May 1900	15 Sep 1968	Now closed.
	Eckesey	Horse	7 Jul 1895	189_	
	Eckesey	Accumulator (storage battery)	1 Jul 1898	20 Oct 1900	
	Eckesey	Electric	21 Oct 1900	26 May 1974	
	Hagen (Haspe) – Voerde – Breckerfeld	Steam	1 May 1903	1927(?)	Opened in stages to 1906. Passenger service withdrawn 1921, restored 1926.
	Hagen (Haspe) – Voerde – Breckerfeld	Electric	9 Dec 1927	2 Nov 1963	Separate tram undertaking to 1926.
	Iserlohn	Electric	4 Mar 1901	31 Dec 1959	

Note for Rheydt: Amalgamated with Mönchengladbach from 29 July 1929 to 31 July 1933, and again from 1 January 1975.

Note for Mettmann: Line extended Düsseldorf (Auf der Hardt) – Mettmann (closed 9 December 1936) – Wülfrath (closed 14 May 1938) – Tönisheide (closed 14 May 1938), and Mettmann – Wieden (closed 17 May 1952). Separate undertaking to 1 April 1937.

Note for Wuppertal: Town tramway system ranked as fifth-largest in Germany, with peak system length of 175 kilometres (109 mi), c.1948.

Bezirksregierung Köln (Cologne Region) towns in geographic order, north to south:

Name of System	Location	Traction Type	Date (From)	Date (To)	Notes
	Opladen – Lützenkirchen	Electric	9 Apr 1914	11 Jul 1955	
	Köln – Opladen – Solingen (Ohligs) / Solingen (Höhscheid)	Electric	22 Jul 1911	10 Jul 1955	
	**Cologne (Köln)**	Horse	28 Apr 1877	22 May 1907	
	**Cologne (Köln)**	Steam	13 Nov 1893	1914	
	**Cologne (Köln)**	Electric	15 Oct 1901		First tunnel segment opened, and **converted to light rail**, in 1968.
Cologne Stadtbahn	**Cologne (Köln)**	Electric	11 Oct 1968		**Light rail**
	Wahn, Cologne	Electric	6 May 1917	1 Oct 1961	
	Cologne, Zündorf – Troisdorf – Siegburg	Electric	19 Mar 1914	31 Aug 1965	Opened in stages, completed 1 October 1921. Closed in stages from 14 October 1963.
Rheinuferbahn	**Cologne – Wesseling – Bonn**	Electric	Sep 1905		
Vorgebirgsbahn	**Cologne – Brühl – Bonn**	Electric	1 Aug 1897		Opened in stages, (Cologne – Brühl) completed 20 January 1898.
Trams in Bonn	**Bonn**	Horse	19 Apr 1891	24 Sep 1909	
Trams in Bonn	**Bonn**	Steam	22 May 1892	12 Oct 1911	Gauge: 1,000 mm (3 ft 3 3/8 in)
Trams in Bonn	**Bonn**	Electric	21 May 1902		First tunnel segment opened 22 March 1975.
Bonn Stadtbahn	**Bonn**	Electric	1975		**Light rail**
	**Bonn – Bad Godesberg**	Steam	22 May 1892	1911	Gauge: 1,000 mm (3 ft 3 3/8 in)
	**Bonn – Bad Godesberg**	Electric	27 Mar 1911		Tunnel segment in Bad Godesberg opened September 1994
	Bad Godesberg – Mehlem	Electric	3 Oct 1911	23 Dec 1976	
	**Bonn – Siegburg**	Electric	21 Sep 1911		
	**Bonn – Königswinter – Bad Honnef**	Electric	18 Mar 1913		Königswinter – Bad Honnef segment opened 27 September 1925.

== Rhineland-Palatinate (Rheinland-Pfalz) ==
Name of System	Location	Traction Type	Date (From)	Date (To)	Notes
	Bad Kreuznach	Electric	11 Sep 1906	5 Jan 1953	Gauge: 1,000 mm (3 ft 3 3/8 in)
	Bingen am Rhein	Electric	25 Feb 1906	20 Oct 1955	
	Idar-Oberstein	Electric	1 Oct 1900	29 Jul 1956	Gauge: 1,000 mm (3 ft 3 3/8 in)
	Kaiserslautern	Electric	18 Dec 1916	1 Jul 1935	Gauge: unknown
	Koblenz	Horse	28 May 1887	1 Oct 1899	Gauge: 1,000 mm (3 ft 3 3/8 in)
	Koblenz	Electric	17 Jan 1899	19 Jul 1967	Gauge: 1,000 mm (3 ft 3 3/8 in)
	**Ludwigshafen am Rhein**	Horse	2 Jun 1878	23 May 1902	
	**Ludwigshafen am Rhein**	Electric	30 May 1902		Gauge: 1,000 mm (3 ft 3 3/8 in); Operated jointly with Mannheim (Baden-Württemberg) system (q.v.).
Rhein-Haardtbahn	**Ludwigshafen – Bad Dürkheim**	Electric	4 Sep 1913		Gauge: 1,000 mm (3 ft 3 3/8 in); Trains operate over town tramway systems in Ludwigshafen and Mannheim (Baden-Württemberg) to serve business centers and main railway stations.
Trams in Mainz	**Mainz**	Horse	27 Sep 1883	1 Oct 1904	Gauge: 1,000 mm (3 ft 3 3/8 in)
Trams in Mainz	**Mainz**	Steam	12 Aug 1891	8 Jun 1923	Gauge: 1,000 mm (3 ft 3 3/8 in)
Trams in Mainz	**Mainz**	Electric	15 Jul 1904		Gauge: 1,000 mm (3 ft 3 3/8 in); See also: Wiesbaden (Hesse).
	Neuwied	Electric	29 Jul 1901	31 Oct 1950	
	Pirmasens	Electric	8 Jun 1905	3 Jul 1943	Gauge: 1,000 mm (3 ft 3 3/8 in)
	Trier	Horse	27 Jul 1890	15 Jul 1905	
	Trier	Electric	13 Oct 1905	14 Sep 1951	
	Worms (am Rhein)	Electric	22 Dec 1906	29 Jan 1956	Gauge: 1,000 mm (3 ft 3 3/8 in)

== Saarland ==
Name of System	Location	Traction Type	Date (From)	Date (To)	Notes
	Neunkirchen (im Saarland)	Electric	13 Sep 1907	10 June 1978	
	**Saarbrücken**	Steam	4 Nov 1890	26 Sep 1899	Gauge: 1,000 mm (3 ft 3 3/8 in)
	**Saarbrücken**	Electric	8 Feb 1899	22 May 1965	Gauge: 1,000 mm (3 ft 3 3/8 in)
Saarbahn	**Saarbrücken**	Electric	24 Oct 1997		Standard gauge line. International line to Sarreguemines in France.
	Rastpfuhl – Heusweiler	Electric	27 Jan 1907	1948	Separate undertaking to 1 July 1937.
	Saarlouis	Electric	20 May 1913	28 Feb 1961	
	Saarlouis – Dillingen (an der Saar)			31 May 1957	
	Völklingen (an der Saar)	Electric	3 Sep 1909	18 Apr 1959	Gauge: 1,000 mm (3 ft 3 3/8 in)

== Saxony (Sachsen) ==
Name of System	Location	Traction Type	Date (From)	Date (To)	Notes
Kirnitzschtalbahn	**Bad Schandau**	Electric	28 May 1898		Gauge: 1,000 mm (3 ft 3 3/8 in); Operation suspended from 21 July 1969 following an accident. Operation restored from 24 July 1972.
Trams in Chemnitz	**Chemnitz**	Horse	22 Apr 1880	5 Feb 1894	Gauge: 914 mm (3 ft)
Trams in Chemnitz	**Chemnitz**	Electric	19 Dec 1893	6 Nov 1988	Gauge: 925 mm (3 ft 13/32 in)
Trams in Chemnitz	**Chemnitz**	Electric	8 May 1960		Converted to 1,435 mm (4 ft 8 1/2 in) standard gauge
	Chemnitz – Altchemnitz – Stollberg	Electric	15 Dec 2002		Operates over DB railway line (Würschnitztalbahn) between Altchemnitz and Stollberg,
Döbeln Tramway	**Döbeln**	Horse	10 Jul 1892; 9 Jun 2007	20 Dec 1926	Gauge: 1,000 mm (3 ft 3 3/8 in); Closed 20 December 1926; reopened as a heritage horsecar line on 9 June 2007.
Trams in Dresden (operated by Dresdner Verkehrsbetriebe)	**Dresden**	Horse	26 Sep 1872	25 Aug 1900	
Trams in Dresden (operated by Dresdner Verkehrsbetriebe)	**Dresden**	Gas	28 Jul 1894	31 Dec 1895	Gauge: 1,450 mm (4 ft 9 3/32 in)
Trams in Dresden (operated by Dresdner Verkehrsbetriebe)	**Dresden**	Electric	6 Jul 1893		Gauge: 1,450 mm (4 ft 9 3/32 in)
	**Dresden – Bühlau**	Electric	22 Aug 1899		Separate undertaking to 1926.
	Dresden-Cotta – Cossebaude	Electric	27 Sep 1906	2 Dec 1990	Separate undertaking to 1926.
Lößnitzbahn	**Dresden-Mickten – Zitzschewig**	Electric	21 Aug 1899		Gauge: 1,000 mm (3 ft 3 3/8 in); First electric narrow-gauge railway in Saxony, later regauged. Separate tram undertaking to 1926. Initial segment, Mickten – Weißes Roß. Weißes Roß – Radebeul – Coswig reopened in stages September 1929 – May 1930. Coswig – Weinböhla reopened 14 November 1931.
Lockwitztalbahn	Dresden-Niedersedlitz – Kreischa	Electric	3 Mar 1906	18 Oct 1977	Gauge: 1,000 mm (3 ft 3 3/8 in)
	Freiberg	Electric	11 Aug 1902	31 Dec 1919	Gauge: 1,000 mm (3 ft 3 3/8 in)
Trams in Görlitz	**Görlitz**	Horse	25 May 1882	30 Nov 1897	
Trams in Görlitz	**Görlitz**	Electric	1 Dec 1897		Gauge: 1,000 mm (3 ft 3 3/8 in); See also Zgorzelec, List of town tramway systems in Poland.
	Hohenstein-Ernstthal – Oelsnitz (Erzgebirge)	Electric	15 Feb 1913	26 Mar 1960	Gauge: 1,000 mm (3 ft 3 3/8 in)
	Klingenthal	Electric	27 May 1917	4 Apr 1964	
Trams in Leipzig	**Leipzig**	Horse	18 May 1872	16 Apr 1897	Gauge: 1,458 mm (4 ft 9 13/32 in)
Trams in Leipzig	**Leipzig**	Electric	17 April 1896		Gauge: 1,458 mm (4 ft 9 13/32 in); See Leipziger Verkehrsbetriebe, Leipzig Tramway Network History.
	Meißen	Electric	13 Dec 1899	1 Mar 1936	Gauge: 1,000 mm (3 ft 3 3/8 in)
Trams in Plauen	**Plauen (im Vogtland)**	Electric	17 Nov 1894		Gauge: 1,000 mm (3 ft 3 3/8 in)
	Zittau	Accumulator (storage battery)	29 Jun 1902(?)	22 Sep 1902	Gauge: 1,450 mm (4 ft 9 3/32 in)
	Zittau	Electric	14 Dec 1904	19 Nov 1919	Gauge: 1,000 mm (3 ft 3 3/8 in)
Trams in Zwickau	**Zwickau**	Electric	6 May 1894		Gauge: 1,000 mm (3 ft 3 3/8 in)

== Saxony-Anhalt (Sachsen-Anhalt) ==
Name of System	Location	Traction Type	Date (From)	Date (To)	Notes
	Bernburg	Electric	1 Apr 1897	19 Apr 1921	Gauge: 1,000 mm (3 ft 3 3/8 in)
Trams in Dessau	**Dessau**	Gas (Petrol?)	15 Nov 1894	24 Mar 1901	
Trams in Dessau	**Dessau**	Electric	26 Mar 1901		
	Groß Rosenburg	Horse	3 Oct 1884	1 Oct 1922	
Trams in Halberstadt	**Halberstadt**	Horse	28 Jun 1887	30 Apr 1903	Gauge: 1,000 mm (3 ft 3 3/8 in)
Trams in Halberstadt	**Halberstadt**	Electric	2 May 1903		Gauge: 1,000 mm (3 ft 3 3/8 in)
Trams in Halle (Saale)	**Halle an der Saale**	Horse	15 Oct 1882	14 May 1899	Gauge: 1,000 mm (3 ft 3 3/8 in)
Trams in Halle (Saale)	**Halle an der Saale**	Electric	24 Apr 1891		Gauge: 1,000 mm (3 ft 3 3/8 in)
	**Halle – Merseburg**	Electric	15 Mar 1902		Gauge: 1,000 mm (3 ft 3 3/8 in); Separate tram undertaking to 1 May 1951.
Trams in Magdeburg	**Magdeburg**	Horse	16 Oct 1877	19 Dec 1899	
Trams in Magdeburg	**Magdeburg**	Steam	14 Jul 1886	21 Mar 1900	
Trams in Magdeburg	**Magdeburg**	Electric	18 Jul 1899		
	Mansfeld – Eisleben	Electric	10 Apr 1900	2 Dec 1922	Gauge: 1,000 mm (3 ft 3 3/8 in)
Trams in Naumburg (Saale)	**Naumburg (an der Saale)**	Electric	18 Jun 1892		Gauge: 1,000 mm (3 ft 3 3/8 in); Operation suspended 19 August 1991 due to poor track condition. Reopened for daily service as a heritage tramline in 2007. Smallest urban tramway in Germany, and one of the smallest in Europe.
	Schönebeck – Salzelmen	Horse	22 Jun 1886	15 Feb 1917	Gauge: 1,000 mm (3 ft 3 3/8 in)
	Staßfurt	Electric	10 Apr 1900	31 Dec 1957	Gauge: 1,000 mm (3 ft 3 3/8 in)
	Stendal	Horse	3 Jun 1892	14 Oct 1926	Gauge: 1,000 mm (3 ft 3 3/8 in)
	Lutherstadt Wittenberg	Horse	26 Jul 1888	1921	Gauge: 1,000 mm (3 ft 3 3/8 in)
	Zerbst	Horse	2 Nov 1891	1 Aug 1928	Gauge: 1,000 mm (3 ft 3 3/8 in)

== Schleswig-Holstein ==
Name of System	Location	Traction Type	Date (From)	Date (To)	Notes
	Wittdün – Norddorf (Amrum island, North Frisian Islands)	Steam	1893	1 Nov 1939	Gauge: 900 mm (2 ft 11 7/16 in)
	Wittdün – Norddorf (Amrum island, North Frisian Islands)	Electric	10 Jul 1909	_ Aug 1910	Gauge: 900 mm (2 ft 11 7/16 in); Use of electric traction ended because generating station was destroyed by fire. Overhead contact system removed 1920. Operation suspended 17 October 1918 – 1920.
	Flensburg	Horse	8 May 1881	30 Dec 1906	
	Flensburg	Electric	6 Jul 1907	2 Jun 1973	Gauge: 1,000 mm (3 ft 3 3/8 in)
Trams in Kiel	Kiel	Horse	9 Jul 1881	11 Apr 1896	Gauge: 1,100 mm (3 ft 7 5/16 in)
Trams in Kiel	Kiel	Electric	12 May 1896	4 May 1985	Gauge: 1,100 mm (3 ft 7 5/16 in)
	Lübeck	Horse	1 May 1881	19 Jun 1894	Gauge: 1,100 mm (3 ft 7 5/16 in)
	Lübeck	Electric	12 May 1894	15 Nov 1959	Gauge: 1,100 mm (3 ft 7 5/16 in)
	Schleswig	Horse	1 Jul 1890	31 Dec 1909	
	Schleswig	Electric	1 Jan 1910	26 Aug 1936	

Light railway (kleinbahn) operating under tramway (straßenbahn) concession (from 1952–1953):

Name of System	Location	Traction Type	Date (From)	Date (To)	Notes
Sylter Inselbahn	Sylt				Gauge: 1,000 mm (3 ft 3 3/8 in)
Nordbahn	Westerland – List		8 Jul 1888	29 Dec 1970	Gauge: 1,000 mm (3 ft 3 3/8 in)
Südbahn	Westerland – Hörnum		1 Jul 1901	30 May 1970	Gauge: 1,000 mm (3 ft 3 3/8 in)

== Thuringia (Thüringen) ==
Name of System	Location	Traction Type	Date (From)	Date (To)	Notes
	Altenburg	Electric	18 Apr 1895	30 Apr 1920	Gauge: 1,000 mm (3 ft 3 3/8 in)
	Eisenach	Electric	3 Aug 1897	31 Dec 1975	Gauge: 1,000 mm (3 ft 3 3/8 in)
	**Erfurt**	Horse	13 May 1883	20 Aug 1894	Gauge: 1,000 mm (3 ft 3 3/8 in)
	**Erfurt**	Electric	1 Jun 1894	1999	Gauge: 1,000 mm (3 ft 3 3/8 in); **Converted light rail**
Erfurt Stadtbahn	**Erfurt**	Electric	1997		**Light rail**. Gauge: 1,000 mm (3 ft 3 3/8 in)
Trams in Gera	**Gera**	Electric	22 Feb 1892		Gauge: 1,000 mm (3 ft 3 3/8 in)
Trams in Gotha	**Gotha**	Electric	3 May 1894		Gauge: 1,000 mm (3 ft 3 3/8 in)
Thüringerwaldbahn	**Gotha – Waltershausen**	Electric	17 Jul 1929		Gauge: 1,000 mm (3 ft 3 3/8 in)
Trams in Jena	**Jena**	Electric	6 Apr 1901		
	Mühlhausen	Electric	21 Dec 1898	27 Jun 1969	Gauge: 1,000 mm (3 ft 3 3/8 in)
Trams in Nordhausen	**Nordhausen**	Electric	25 Aug 1900		Gauge: 1,000 mm (3 ft 3 3/8 in)
	Weimar	Electric	4 Jun 1899	30 Jun 1937	Gauge: 1,000 mm (3 ft 3 3/8 in)

== See also ==
- Trams in Germany
- List of town tramway systems in Europe
- List of tram and light rail transit systems
- List of metro systems
- List of trolleybus systems in Germany
