= Trams in Kiel =

Coordinates: 54°19′31″N 10°08′26″E

Kiel tramway network
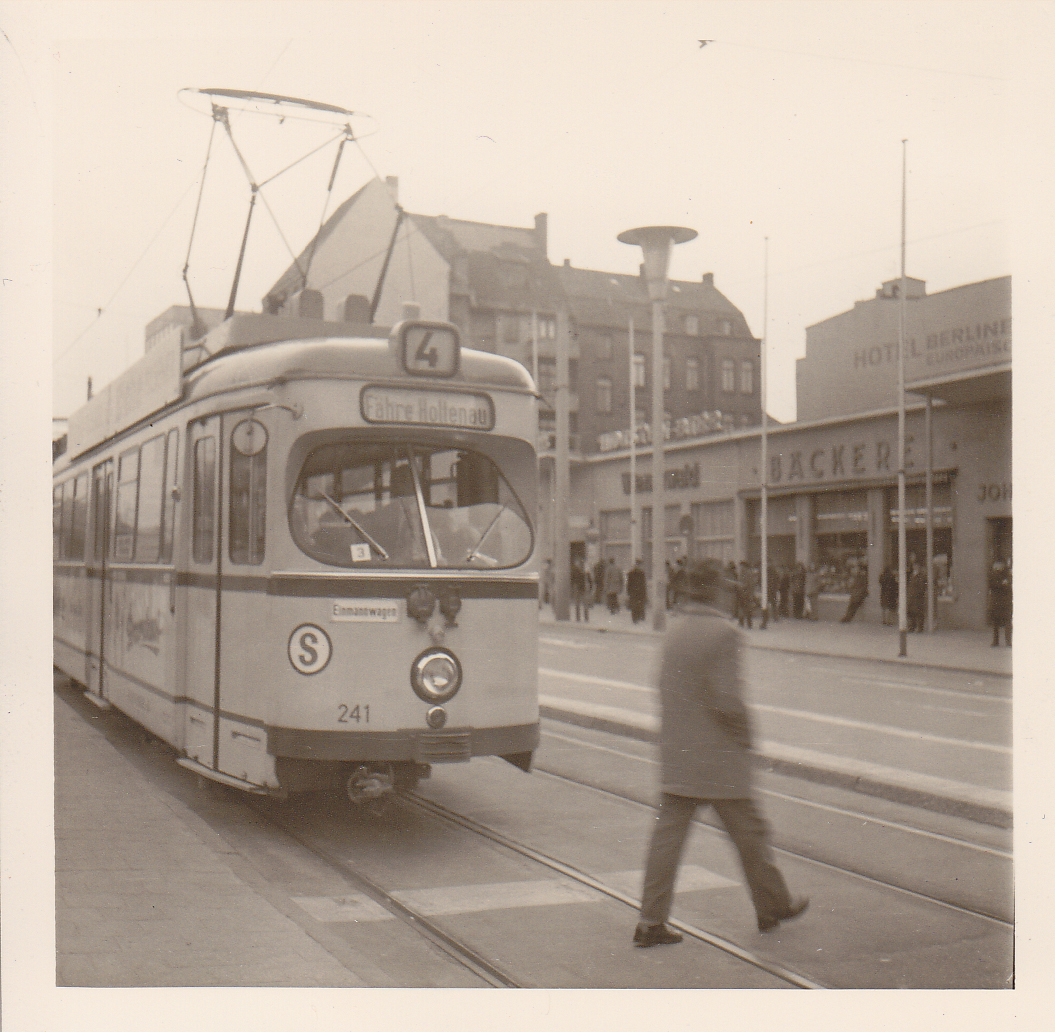
- DÜWAG tram no. 241 in Kiel, March 1974.

Operation
- Locale: Kiel, Schleswig-Holstein, Germany

Statistics
Horsecar era: 1881–1896
- Status: Closed
- Operator: Allgemeine Lokalbahn- und Kraftwerke AG (ALOKA)
- Track gauge: 1,100 mm (3 ft 7 5/16 in)
- Propulsion system: horses
Electric tram era: 1896–1985
- Status: Closed
- Operators: Allgemeine Lokalbahn- und Kraftwerke AG (ALOKA) (1896–1942); Kieler Verkehrs-AG (KVAG) (1942–1985)
- Track gauge: 1,100 mm (3 ft 7 5/16 in)
- Propulsion system: Electricity
- Electrification: V DC wire

The Kiel tramway network (German: Straßenbahnnetz Kiel) once formed part of the public transport system in Kiel, now in the federal state of Schleswig-Holstein, Germany. Opened in 1881, the network lasted until 1985. Kiel tramway was the last tram system in Schleswig-Holstein.

== See also ==
- List of town tramway systems in Germany
- Trams in Germany
