= Koszalin Narrow Gauge Railway =

Transport company in Poland

Koszalińska Kolej Wąskotorowa
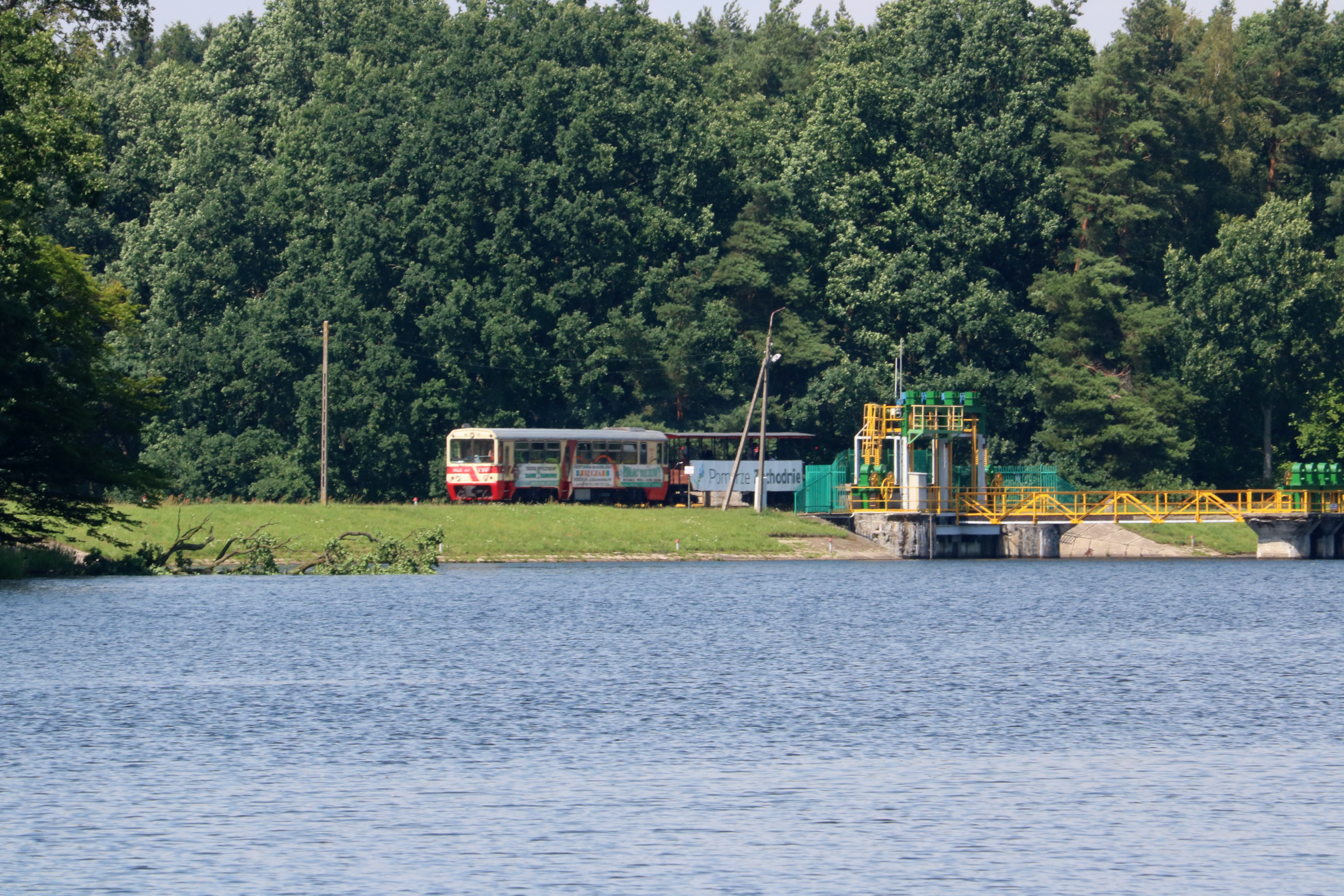
- Locale: West Pomerania
- Terminus: Koszalin

Preserved operations
- Preserved gauge: 1000 mm

The Koszalin Narrow Gauge Railway is a metre gauge railway located in the West Pomeranian Voivodeship, Poland. Seasonal tourist trains are run during the summer on the Koszalin - Rosnowo section of the former Koszalin - Bobolice Wąskotorowe railway line.

== Fleet ==
=== Steam Locomotives ===
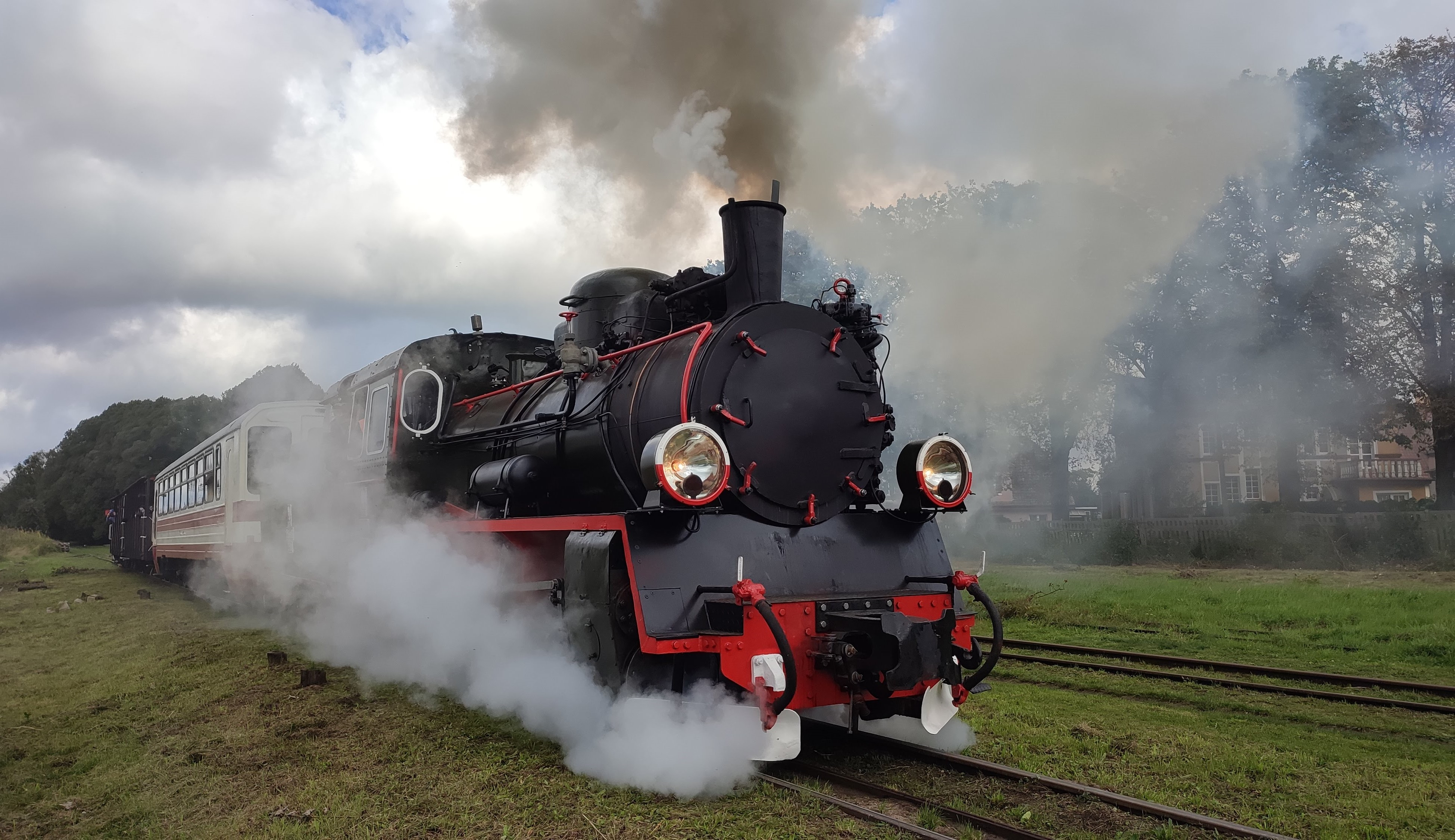

- Px48-3901
- Px48-3910

=== Diesel Locomotives ===
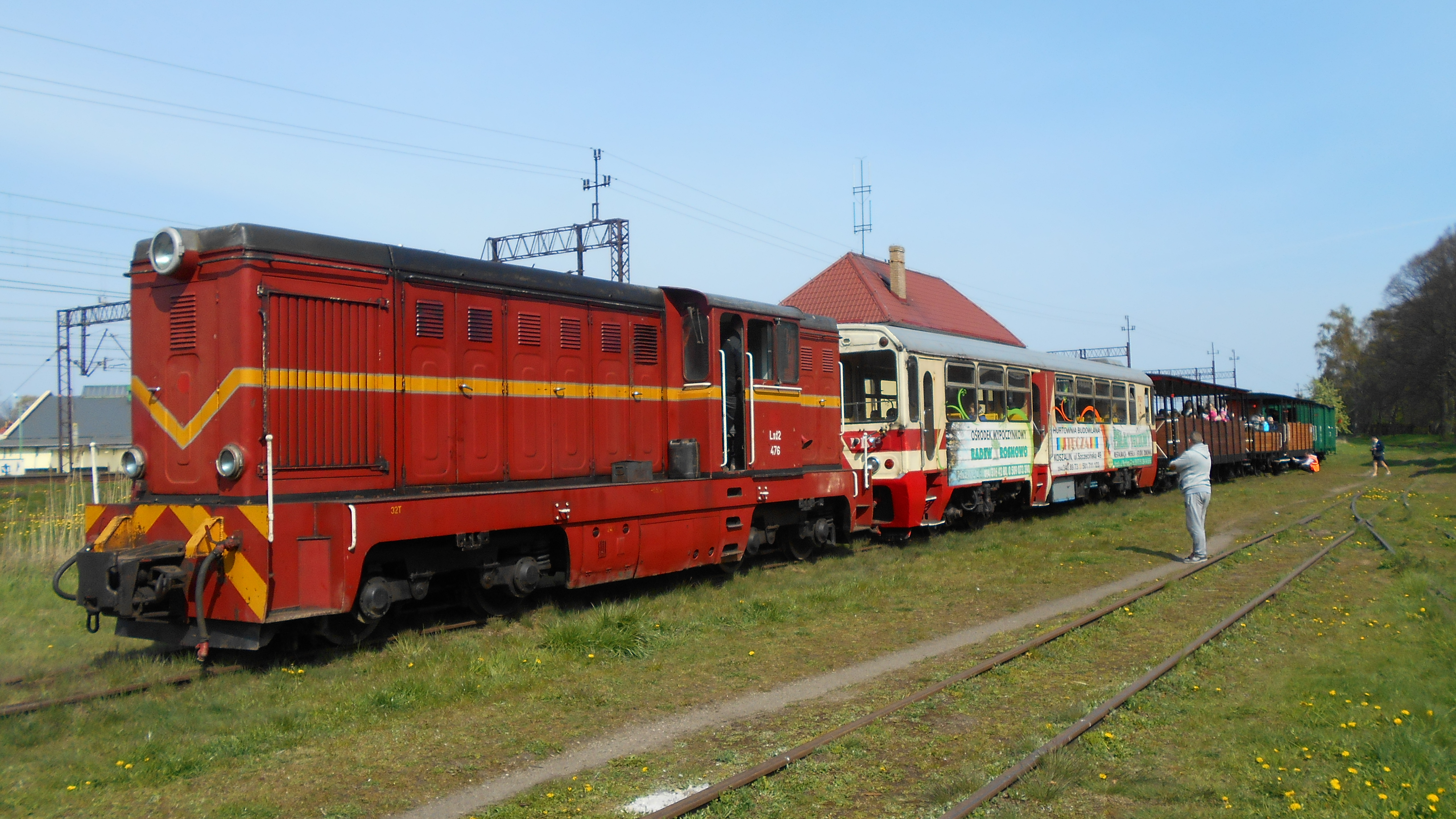

- Lxd2-468
- Lxd2-475
- Lxd2-476
- Lyd2-05

=== Diesel Railcars ===
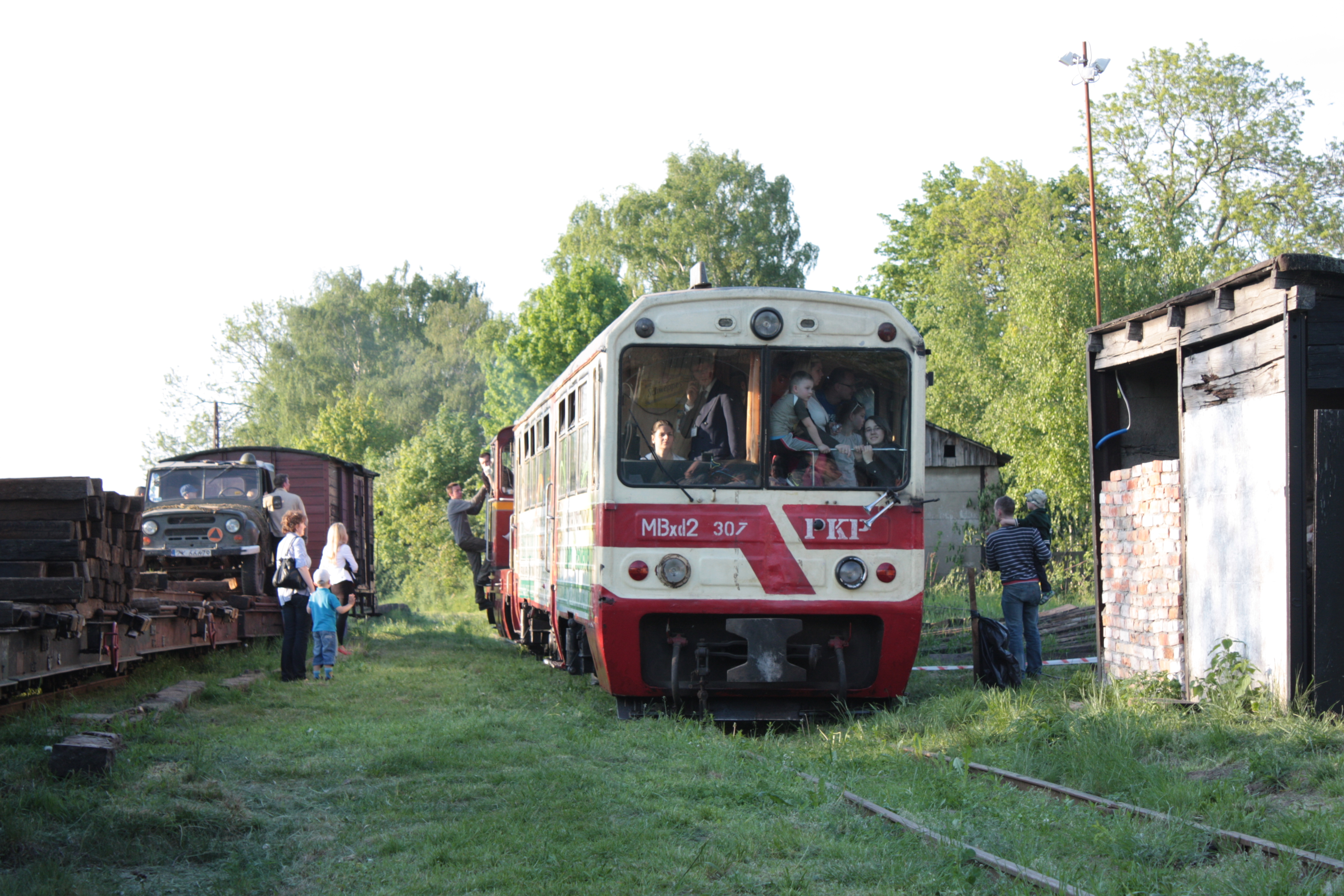

- MBxd2-220
- MBxd2-307
