= Trams in Jena =

Coordinates: 50°55′N 11°35′E

Jena tramway network
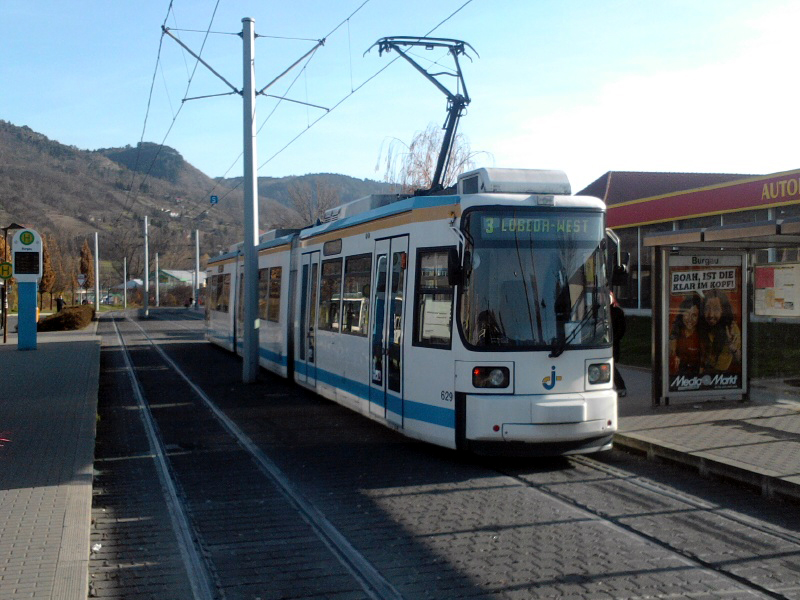
- A GT6M-ZR tram at the Burgau stop, 2008

Operation
- Locale: Jena, Thuringia, Germany
- Open: 1901
- Status: Operational
- Lines: 5
- Operator: Jenaer Nahverkehrsgesellschaft

Infrastructure
- Track gauge: 1,000 mm (3 ft 3 3/8 in) metre gauge
- Propulsion system: Electricity

Statistics
Overview
Jena tram network.
- Website: http://www.jenah.de Jenaer Nahverkehrsgesellschaft mbH (in German)

The Jena tramway network (German: Straßenbahnnetz Jena) is a network of tramways forming part of the public transport system in Jena, a city in the federal state of Thuringia, Germany.

Opened in 1901, the network is currently operated by Jenaer Nahverkehr, and is integrated in the Verkehrsverbund Mittelthüringen (VMT). It has five lines in operation.

== Lines ==
On 17 December 2009, a new network of lines was introduced to coincide with the opening of the new Göschwitz–Burgau line. Since December 2017 all lines are also operated in the evening/overnight.

Line	Route
1	Zwätzen–Stadtzentrum–Bahnhof Göschwitz–Lobeda-West(–Lobeda-Ost)
2	Jena-Ost–Stadtzentrum–Winzerla
3	Winzerla–Bahnhof Göschwitz–Lobeda-West–Lobeda-Ost
4	Zwätzen–Stadtzentrum–Alt-Lobeda–Lobeda-West
5	Ernst-Abbe-Platz–Stadtzentrum–Alt-Lobeda–Lobeda-Ost

Lines 1 and 4 operate in fliegende Wechsel (flying exchange): i.e., at Lobeda-West all trams arriving on one of these lines departs on the other.

== Rolling stock ==
The fleet of the Jena tram network consists of 14 Bombardier GT6M-ZR trams, and five Solaris Tramino trams. In 2019, Jenaer Nahverkehr and the City of Jena announced preparations for an invitation of tenders for new trams, which are due to be delivered from 2022. Stadler won the tender for an order of 24 Tramlink vehicles in August 2020, composed of sixteen 42-meter long seven-section trams and eight 32-meter long five-section trams. The first vehicle was delivered on 5 May 2023. They entered service on 16 December 2023.

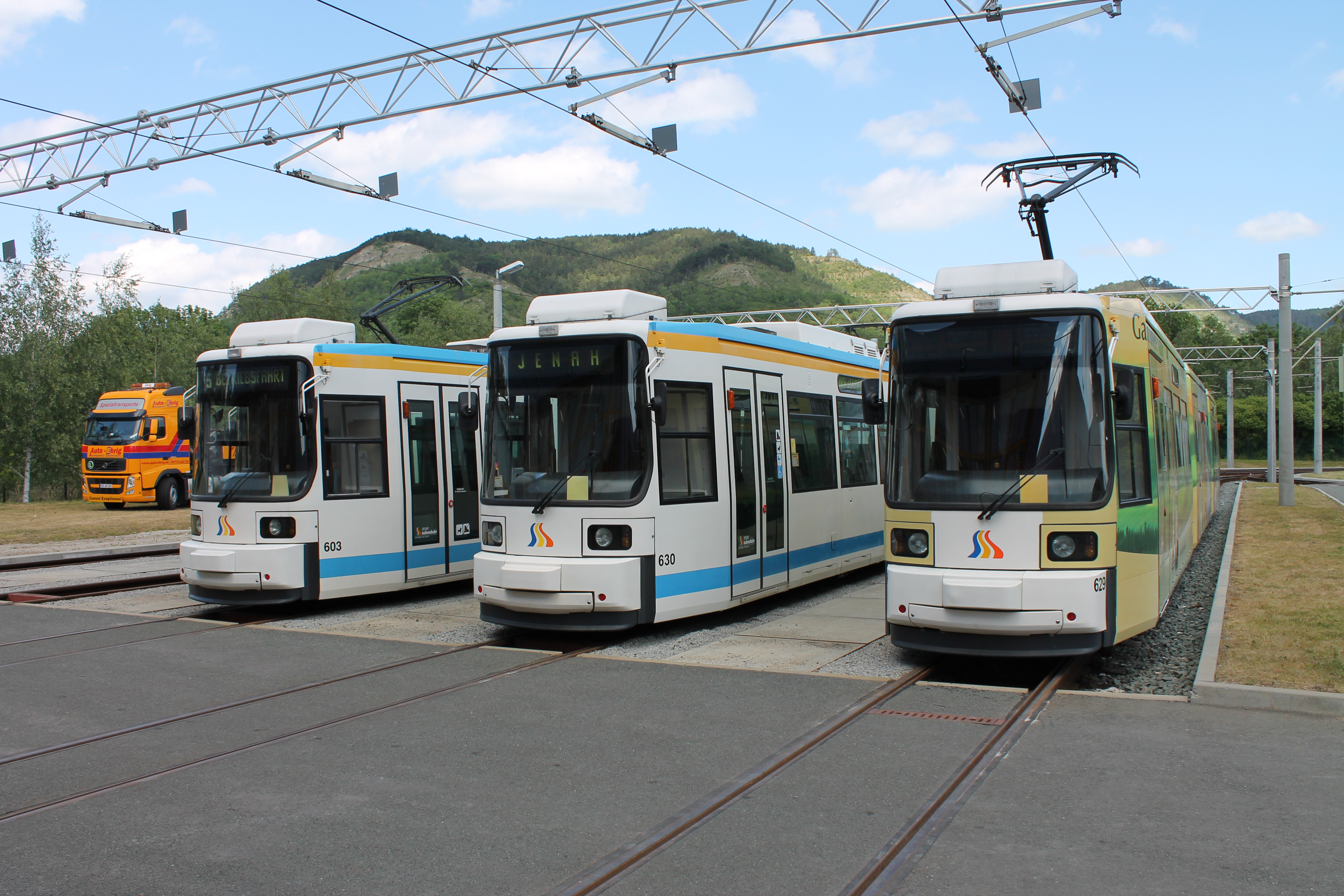
GT6M trams in June 2012

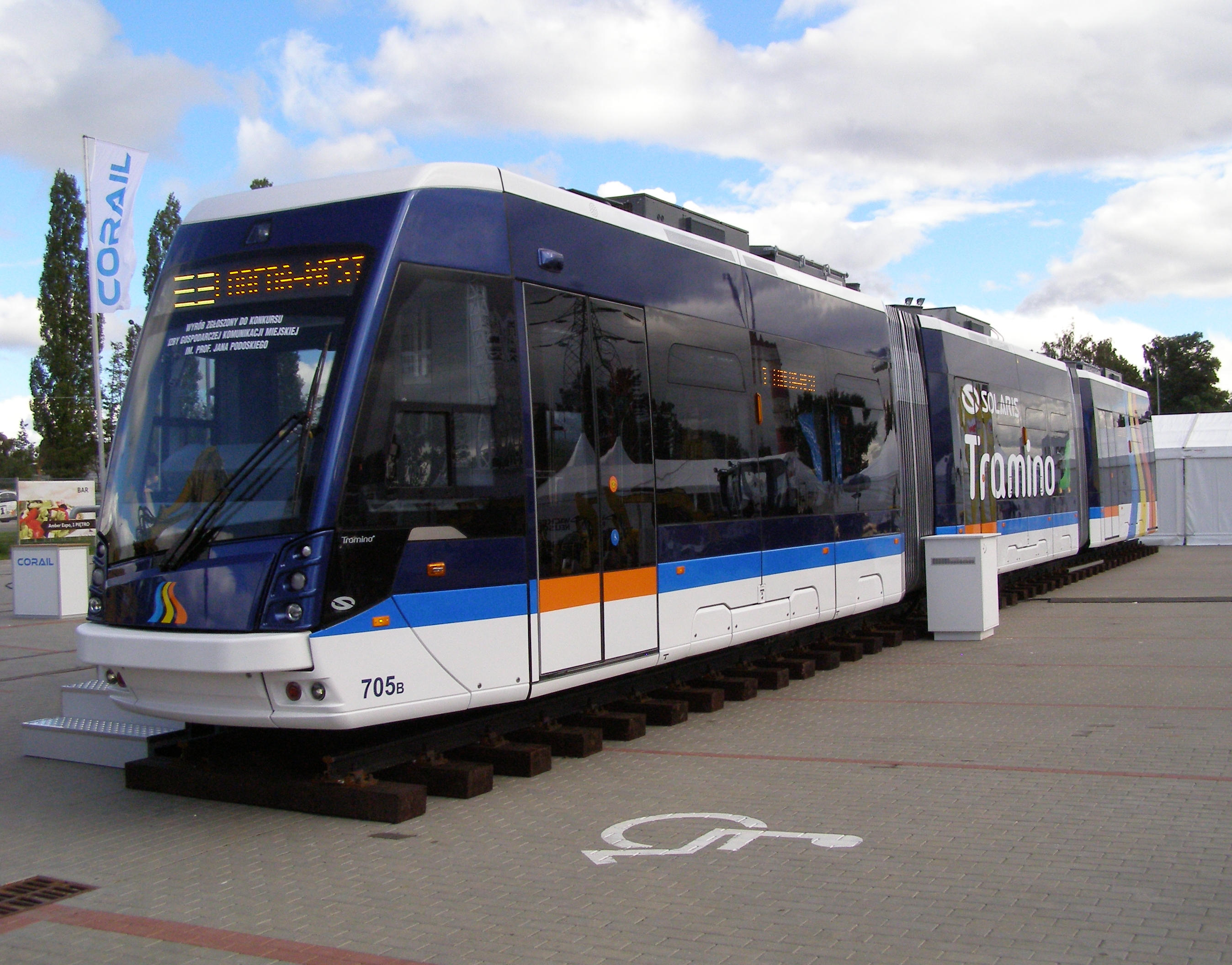
Solaris Tramino Jena at the International Railway Fair Trako 2013

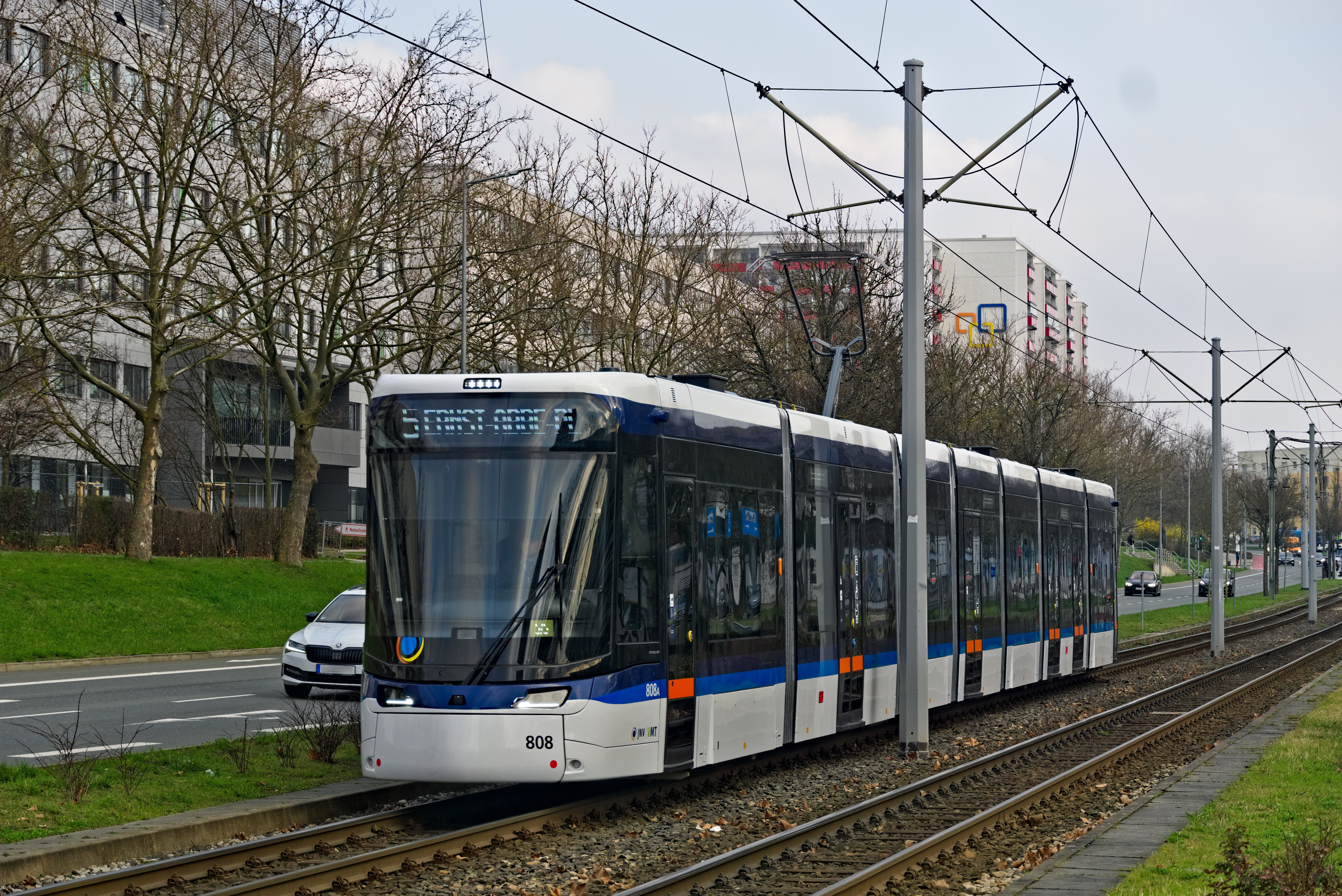
Stadler Tramlink in March 2024

== See also ==
- List of town tramway systems in Germany
- Trams in Germany
