= Trams in Würzburg =

Coordinates: 49°47′N 09°56′E

Würzburg tramway network
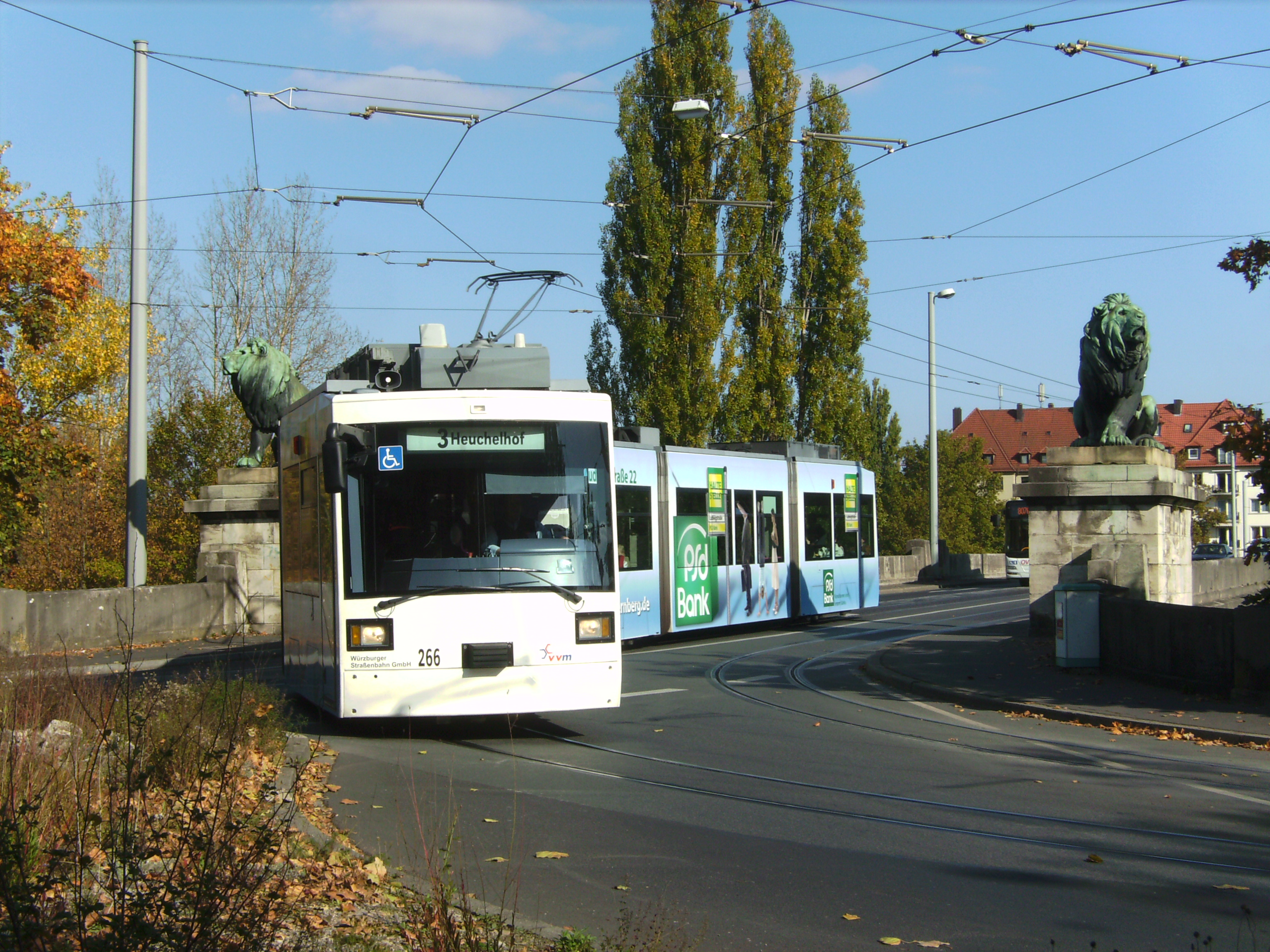
- A GT-N tram crossing the Löwenbrücke, Würzburg, 2007

Operation
- Locale: Würzburg, Bavaria, Germany

Statistics
Horsecar era: 1892–1900
- Status: Converted to electricity
- Operators: Würzburger Straßenbahn, Havestad, Contag & Cie
- Propulsion system: Horses
Electric tram era: since 1900
- Status: Operational
- Lines: 5
- Operator: Würzburger Straßenbahn GmbH
- Track gauge: 1,000 mm (3 ft 3 3/8 in)
- Propulsion system: Electricity
- Electrification: 750 V DC
- Stock: 41
- Track length (single): 42 km (26 mi)
- Route length: ~21 km (13 mi)
- Stops: 46
- annually: c. 20 million
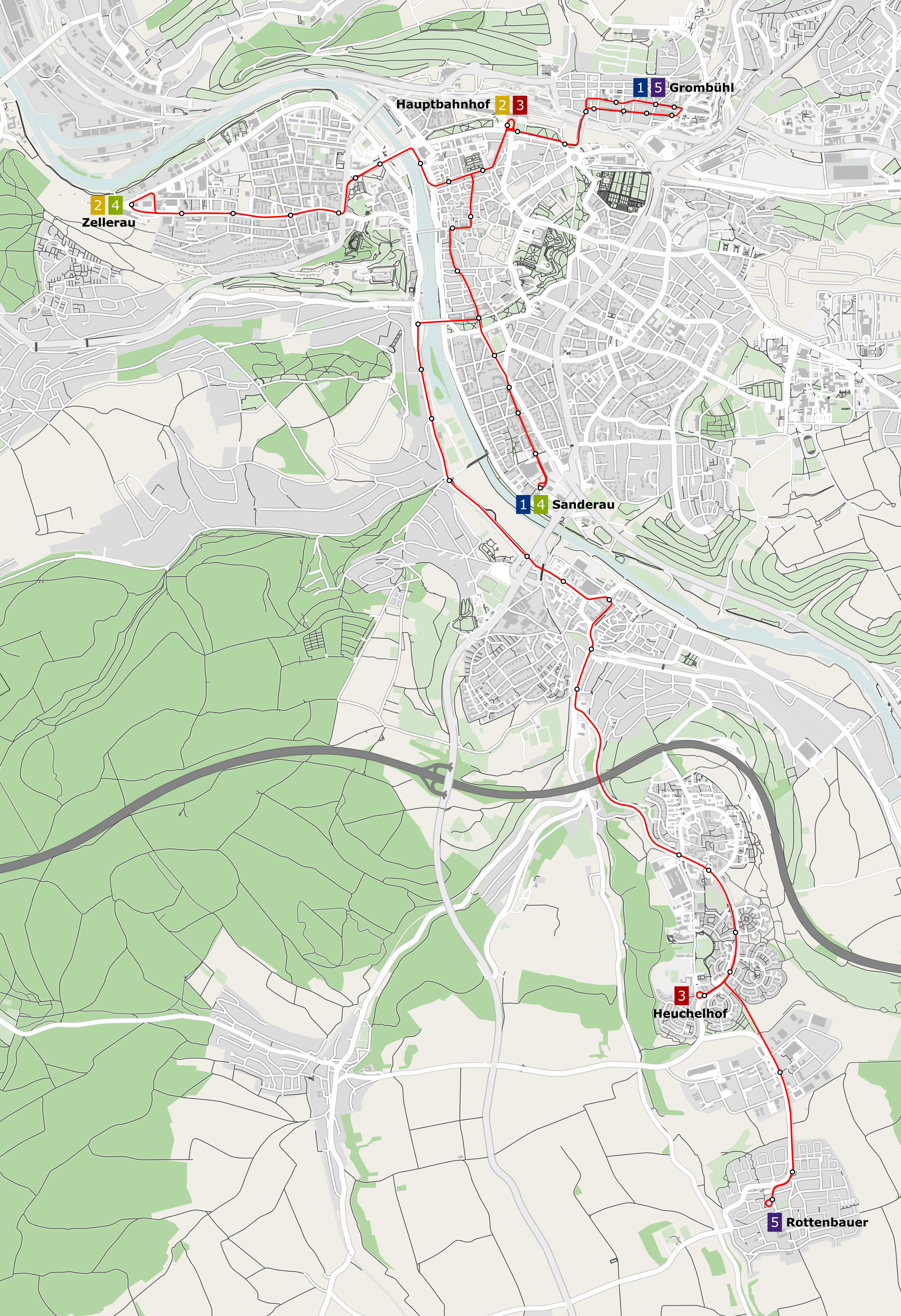
Würzburg tramway network, 2012.
- Website: http://www.vvm-info.de/vvm/de/home.jsp Würzburger Versorgungs- und Verkehrs-GmbH (in German)

The Würzburg tramway network (German: Straßenbahnnetz Würzburg) is a network of tramways forming part of the public transport system in Würzburg, a city in the federal state of Bavaria, Germany.

The network currently consists of five lines, with a total track length of 42 kilometres (26 mi) (yielding a one-way route length of approximately 21 kilometres (13 mi)). It is operated by Würzburger Straßenbahn GmbH, a subsidiary of Würzburger Versorgungs- und Verkehrs-GmbH (WVV), and as of 1 January 2025, is integrated in the Nahverkehr Mainfranken (NVM) transport association. Before then, it was integrated in one of NVM's predecessors, the Verkehrsunternehmens-Verbund Mainfranken (VVM).

== History ==
The first horse-drawn tramway opened in Würzburg in 1892. The first electric trams went into operation in Würzburg in 1900.

Beginning in the 1990s, a concerted effort was made to move Würzburg's tram lines into their own rights-of-way and convert them more to a light rail (Stadtbahn) type of operation over the traditional tram system operating in regular road traffic. Currently, most of Würzburg tram lines, outside of sections downtown and in the Sanderau district, operate as light rail in their own rights-of-way. In addition, low-floor light rail vehicles were purchased.

== Lines ==
As of 2013, the network was made up of the following five lines:

Line	Route	Travel time	Length*
1	Grombühl Uni-Kliniken – Hauptbahnhof – Juliuspromenade – Stadtmitte – Sanderring – Sanderau	20 min	10.4 km
2	Hauptbahnhof – Juliuspromenade – Wörthstraße – Zellerau	14 min	8.0 km
3	Hauptbahnhof – Juliuspromenade – Stadtmitte – Sanderring – Steinbachtal – Reuterstraße – Heuchelhof	27 min	19.3 km
4	Sanderau – Sanderring – Stadtmitte – Wörthstraße – Zellerau	23 min	12.6 km
5	Grombühl Uni-Kliniken – Hauptbahnhof – Juliuspromenade – Stadtmitte – Sanderring – Steinbachtal – Reuterstraße – Heuchelhof – Rottenbauer	39 min	26.2 km

* The figure refers to both directions, ie a complete round trip.

== Rolling stock ==
The Würzburg tram fleet consists of:

- GTW-D8 (6 trams, built by Düwag in 1968)
- GT-E (14 trams, built by LHB in 1989)
- GT-N (20 trams, built by Alstom LHB in 1995)
- GT-F (18 trams, built by HeiterBlick in 2022 - today)

An Artic tram was tested on the network in October 2014. 18 new low-floor GT-F trams were ordered from HeiterBlick in 2019, with deliveries scheduled to begin in 2022. Due to numerous delays, the first tram was delivered in December 2024. As of October 2026, five vehicles have been delivered, with the first vehicles set to enter service soon.

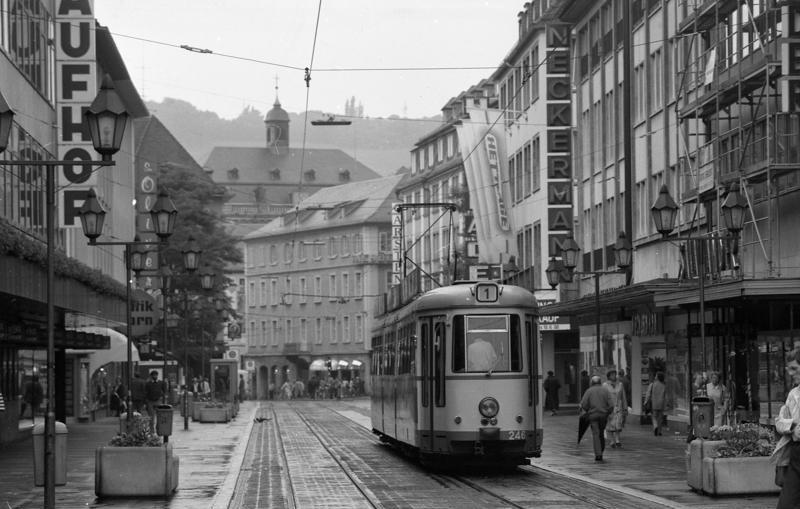
GTW-D8

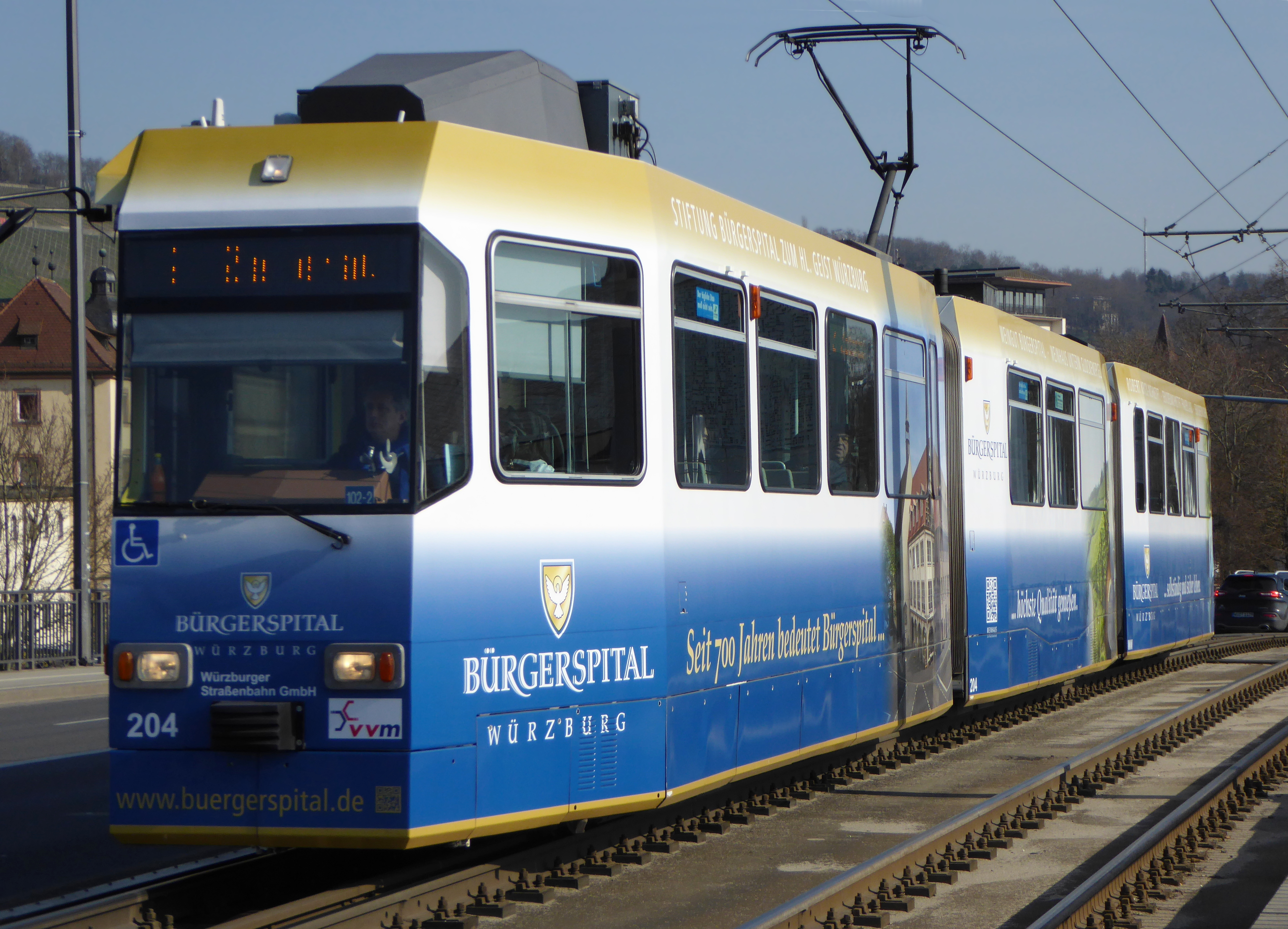
GT-E

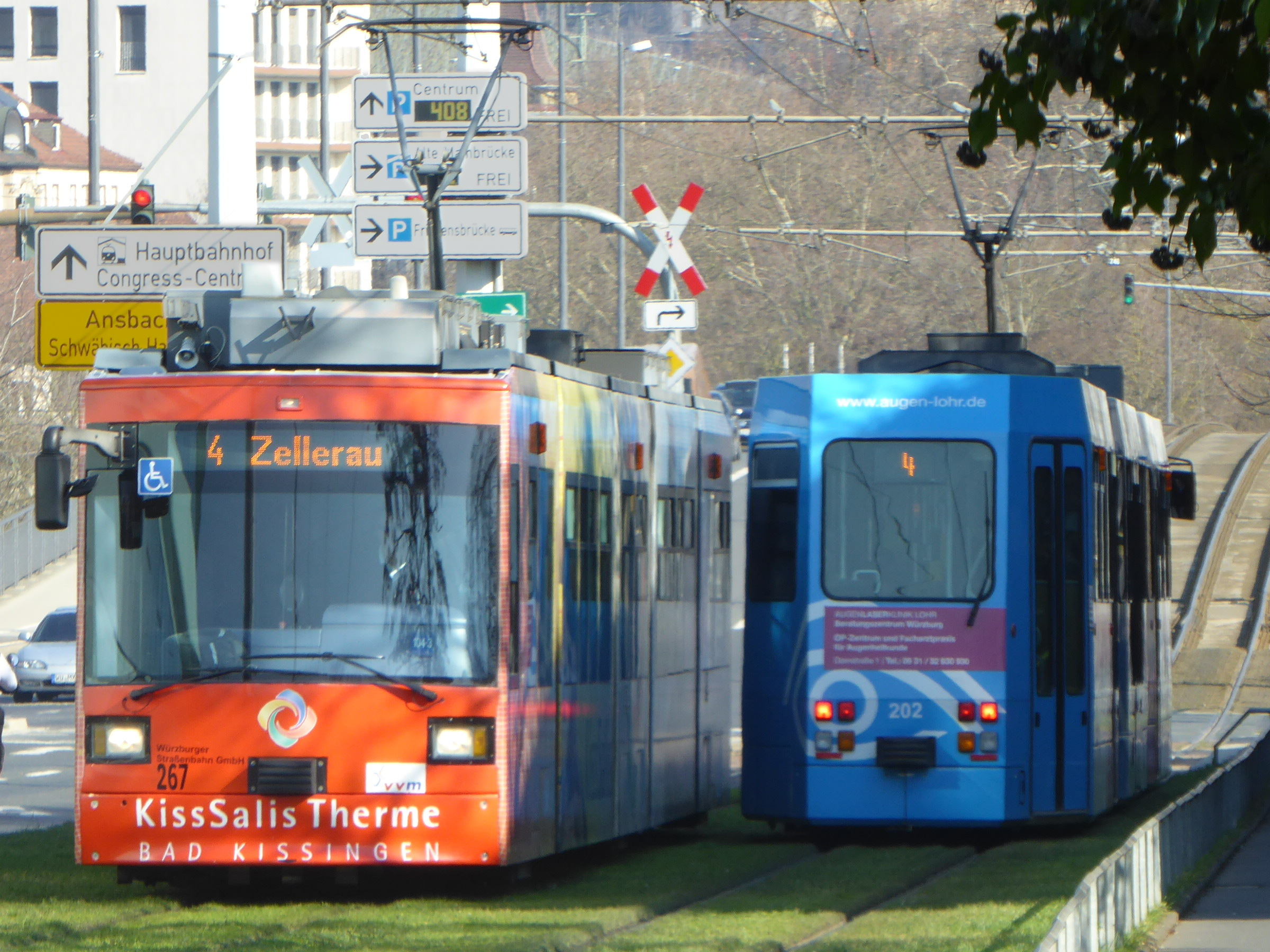
GT-N (left)

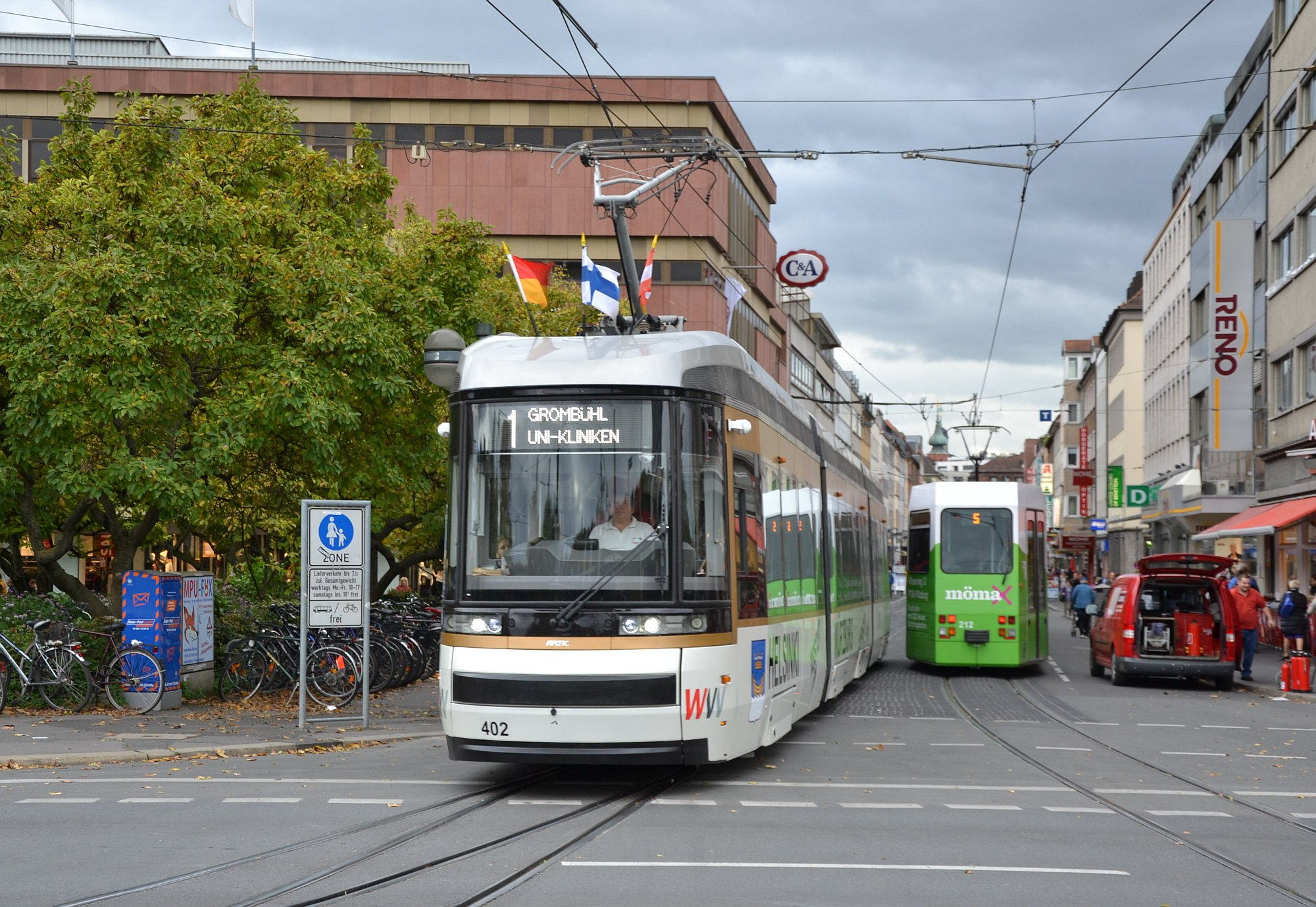
Transtech Artic

== See also ==
- Trams in Germany
- List of town tramway systems in Germany
