= Trams in Halberstadt =

Tram system in Halberstadt, Germany

Coordinates: 51°54′15″N 11°02′45″E

Halberstadt tramway network
- Straßenbahn Halberstadt
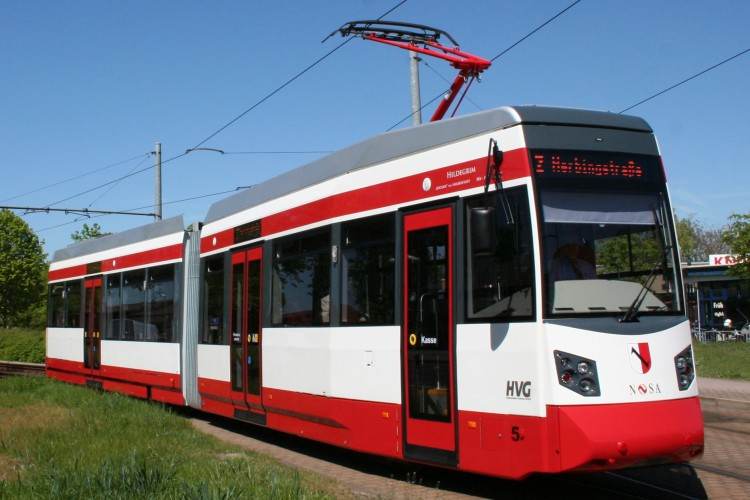
- A Leoliner NGTW6-H low-floor tram in Halberstadt, 2007

Operation
- Locale: Halberstadt, Saxony-Anhalt, Germany

Statistics
Horsecar era: 28 June 1887–30 April 1903
- Status: Converted to electricity
- Track gauge: 1,000 mm (3 ft 3 3/8 in)
- Propulsion system: Horses
Electric tram era: since 2 May 1903
- Status: Operational
- Lines: 2
- Operator: Halberstädter Verkehrs-GmbH
- Track gauge: 1,000 mm (3 ft 3 3/8 in)
- Propulsion system: Electricity
- Electrification: 600 V DC
- Route length: 11.7 km (7.3 mi)
- Website: http://www.stadtverkehr-halberstadt.de/ Halberstädter Verkehrs-GmbH (HVG) (in German)

The Halberstadt tramway (German: Straßenbahn Halberstadt) is a network of tramways forming part of the public transport system in Halberstadt, a city in Saxony-Anhalt, Germany.

Opened in 1887, the network has been operated since 1992 by Halberstädter Verkehrs-GmbH (HVG), which also operates the city's bus network.

== History ==
The first tramway in Halberstadt opened in 1887, in the form of a horse-drawn system operated by Halberstädter Pferdebahn AG. There were three lines, from Fischmarkt to the railway station, Voigtei and Johannestor. The system was taken over by the city of Halberstadt on 1 July 1902, and electric tram operation began on 2 May 1903 with the construction of a new tram depot on Gröperstrasse.

On 8 April 1945, during the Second World War, the system suffered severe damage to both facilities and vehicles due to aerial bombing, and the tram service was temporary suspended. Services resumed on 18 August 1945.

From 1 May 1951 the network was operated by the VEB Verkehrsbetriebe Halberstadt, which from 1 January 1982 was incorporated into the VEB Verkehrskombinat Magdeburg. In 1992 the system was returned to city control, and the city owned HVG was founded to own and operate it.

== Lines ==
The tramway currently operates two routes, both of which start at the Hauptbahnhof.

Route	Selected stops on the route	Notes
1	Hauptbahnhof – Heinrich-Heine-Platz – Fischmarkt – Holzmarkt – Zuckerfabrik – Friedhof	Runs Monday to Saturday only
2	Hauptbahnhof – Heinrich-Heine-Platz – Landratsamt – Herbingstraße (– Klus) – Herbingstraße – Westerhäuser Straße – Holzmarkt – Voigtei – Sargstedter Weg	Runs via Klus only on weekends

Service starts at 05:00, and ceases at 20:00 on weekdays and at 18:30 on weekends and public holidays.

== Rolling stock ==
=== Main Fleet ===
- 5 low-floor articulated Leoliner NGTW6-H, numbers 1 to 5
- 3 articulated bi-directional GT4, numbers 164 (formerly Freiburg 106), 167 (formerly Nordhausen 91, formerly Freiburg 110), 168 (formerly Nordhausen 92, formerly Freiburg 111)
- 1 articulated uni-directional GT4, number 156 (formerly Stuttgart 550)

=== Historical trams and special cars ===
- 1 Historical Lindner tram built in 1939, number 31
- 1 Historical LOWA ET 54 tram built in 1956, number 36
- 1 ET 57 tram with EB 62 trailer, numbers 39 and 61 respectively
- 1 ET 62 tram, number 30
- 1 Reko tram, number 29
- 1 articulated bi-directional GT4 "HAKIBA" (Halberstäder Kinderbahn), number 166 (formerly Freiburg 104)
- 1 articulated bi-directional GT4 maintenance tram, number 161 (formerly Freiburg 105)

== See also ==
- List of town tramway systems in Germany
- Trams in Germany

== Bibliography ==
- Bauer, Gerhard; Kuschinski, Norbert (1994). Die Straßenbahnen in Ostdeutschland [The Tramways in East Germany]. Vol. Band 2: Sachsen-Anhalt, Thüringen [Volume 2: Saxony-Anhalt, Thuringia]. Aachen, Germany: Schweers + Wall. ISBN 392167980X.
- Schwandl, Robert (2012). Schwandl's Tram Atlas Deutschland (in German and English) (3rd ed.). Berlin: Robert Schwandl Verlag. ISBN 9783936573336.
