= Trams in Naumburg =

Tram network in Saxony Anhalt, Germany

Coordinates: 51°09′20″N 11°48′45″E

Naumburg (Saale) tramway
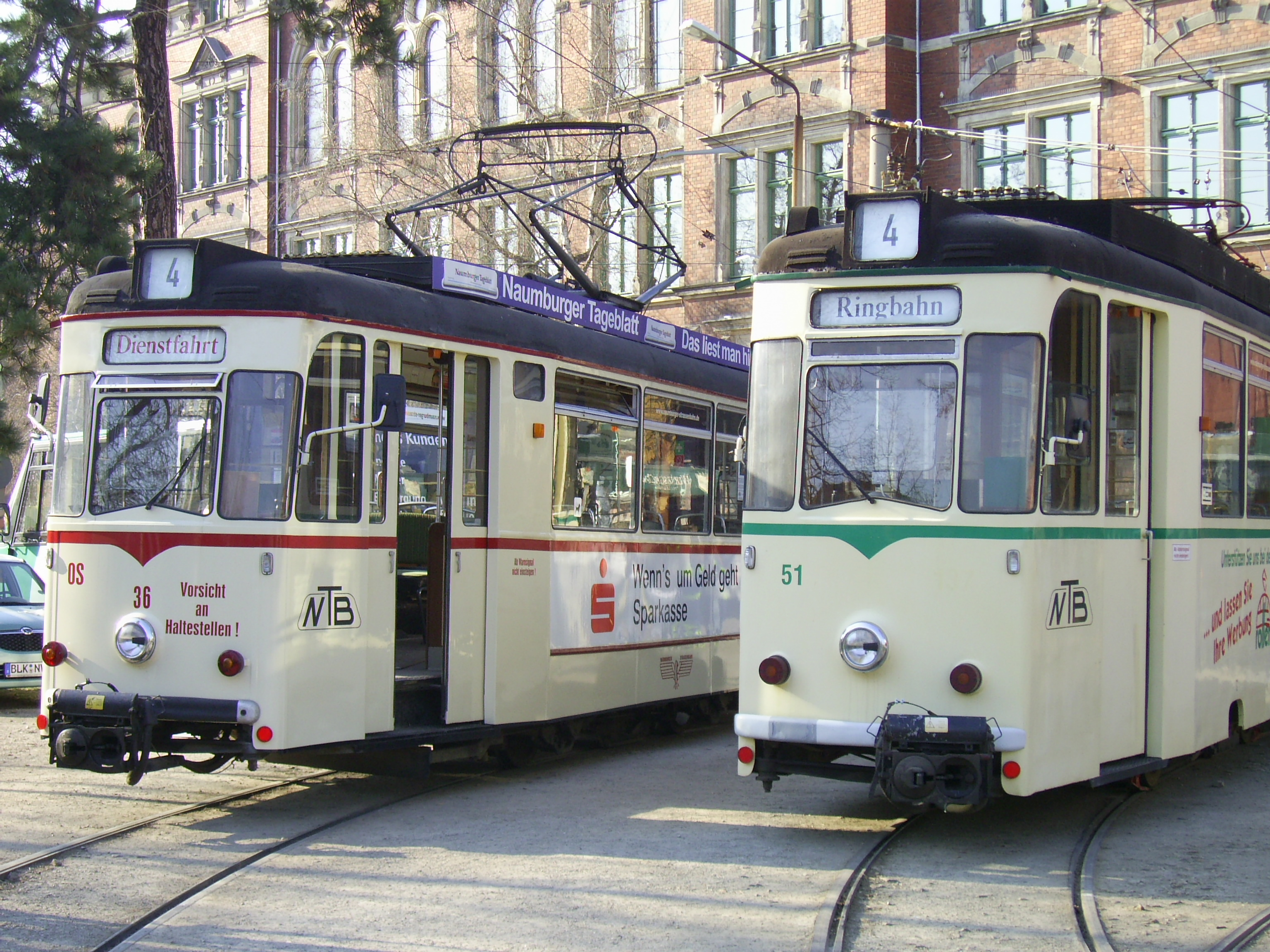
- Cars 36 and 51 outside the depot, 2007

Operation
- Locale: Naumburg (Saale), Saxony-Anhalt, Germany

Statistics
Steam tram era: 1892–1906
- Status: Converted to electricity
- Track gauge: 1,000 mm (3 ft 3 3/8 in)
- Propulsion system: Steam
Electric tram era: since 1907
- Status: Operational
- Lines: 1
- Operator: Naumburger Straßenbahn
- Track gauge: 1,000 mm (3 ft 3 3/8 in)
- Propulsion system: Electricity
- Electrification: 600 V DC
- Route length: 2.9 km (1.8 mi)
- 2018: 178,600
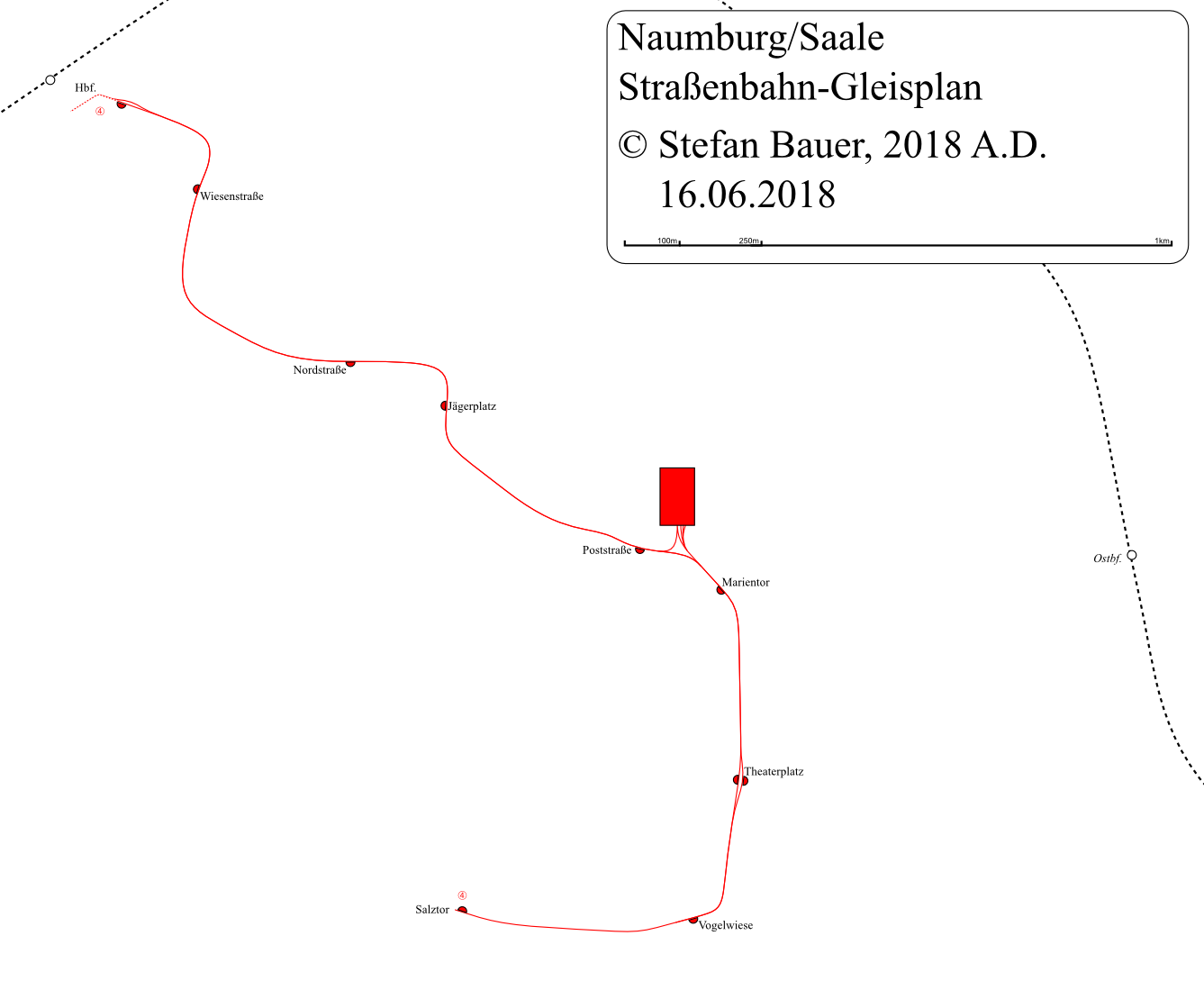
Naumburg (Saale) tramway network 2018
r
- Website: http://www.naumburger-strassenbahn.de/ Naumburger Straßenbahn (in German)

The Naumburg (Saale) tramway (German: Straßenbahn Naumburg (Saale)) is a tramline forming part of the public transport system in Naumburg (Saale), a city in the federal state of Saxony-Anhalt, Germany. At only 2.9 km (1.8 mi) long, it is the smallest urban tramway in Germany, and one of the smallest in Europe.

== History ==
Service with steam trams began on 15 September 1892. The network was electrified in 1907.

Tram operation was suspended on 19 August 1991 due to financial difficulties and declining numbers of passengers. In 1994, 300 m (980 ft) of track was restored for weekend services, initially as a horsedrawn tram, with electric service resuming in 1995. Operation of the tramway was assumed by Naumburger Straßenbahn GmbH.

Daily services on parts of the former loop line began on 31 March 2007.

An extension of the line from Vogelwiese to Salztor was opened in 2017.

== Lines ==
The network formerly consisted of a loop line around Naumburg Cathedral. Today, the 2.9 km (1.8 mi) line, numbered Linie 4, runs on parts of the former loop arrangement from Naumburg Hauptbahnhof to Salztor.

== See also ==
- List of town tramway systems in Germany
- Trams in Germany
