= Trams in Plauen =

Tram system in Plauen, Germany

Coordinates: 50°29′48″N 12°08′10″E

Plauen tramway network
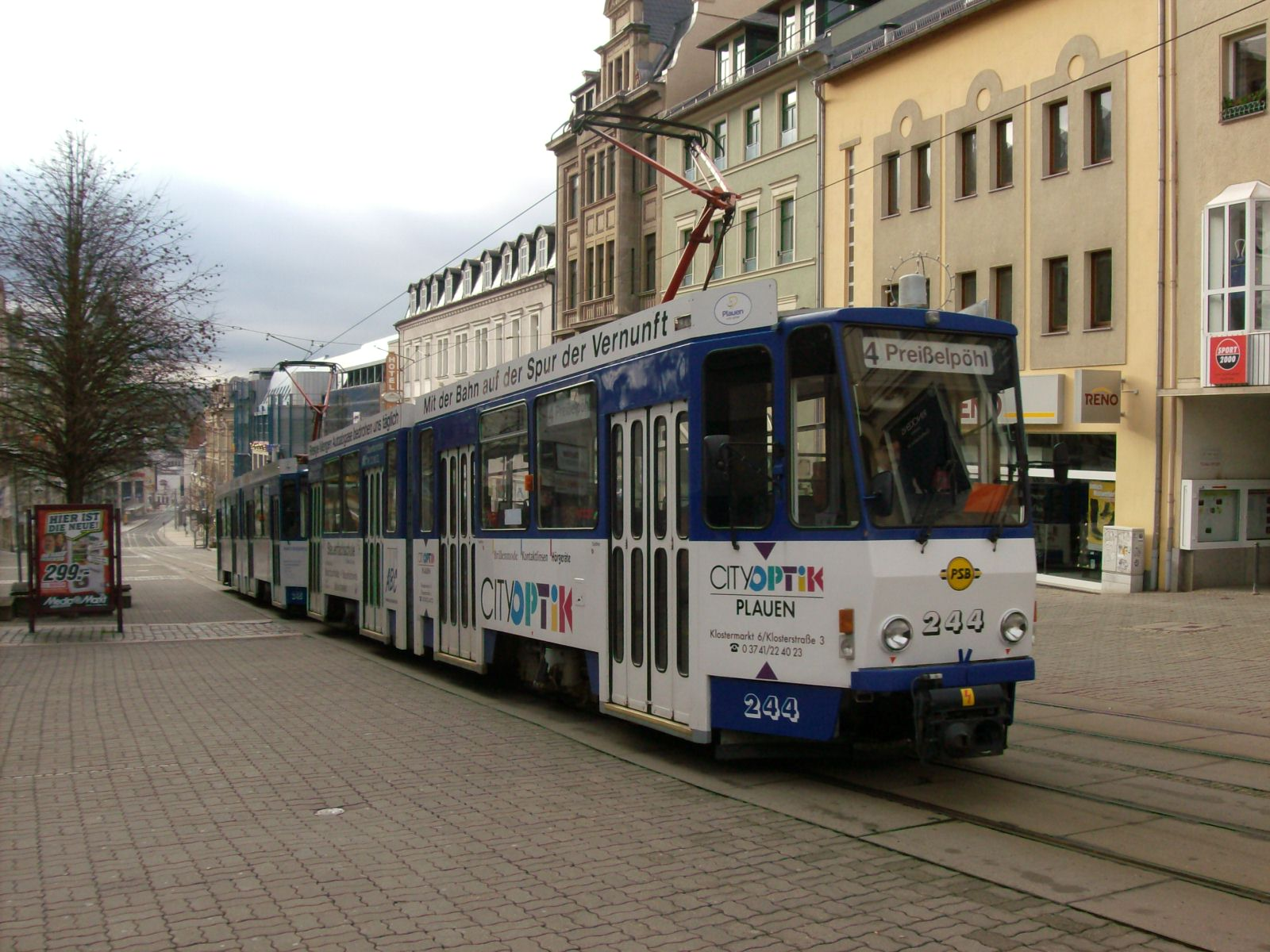
- A pair of KT4D trams on Bahnhofstraße

Operation
- Locale: Plauen, Saxony, Germany
- Open: 17 November 1894
- Status: Operational
- Lines: 4
- Operators: Plauener Straßenbahn GmbH (PSB); (since 1990)

Infrastructure
- Track gauge: 1,000 mm (3 ft 3 3/8 in)
- Propulsion system: Electricity
- Electrification: 600 V DC

Statistics
- Route length: 16.4 km (10.2 mi)
Overview
- Website: https://www.strassenbahn-plauen.de Plauener Straßenbahn GmbH (PSB) (in German)

The Plauen tramway (German: Straßenbahn Plauen) is a network of tramways forming part of the public transport system in Plauen, Germany.

Opened in 1894, the network has been operated since 1990 by Plauener Straßenbahn GmbH (PSB), and is integrated in the Verkehrsverbund Vogtland (VVV).

== Lines ==
As of 2025, the network had the following lines:

Line	Route	Journey time	Low-floor percentage
1	Preißelpöhl – Am Albertplatz – Tunnel – Vogtlandklinikum – Reusa	21–23 minutes	1/2 to 1
2	Plamag – Am Albertplatz – Tunnel – Vogtlandklinikum – Waldfrieden	23–25 minutes	1/2 to 1
3	Neundorf – Tunnel – Am Albertplatz – Oberer Bahnhof	16–17 minutes	0 to 2/3
4	Neundorf – Tunnel – Südvorstadt	16–18 minutes	1/3 to 1

Headways: 30 min, Saturday 20 min, Monday to Friday 15 minutes, exception: if no school day then 3 and 4 30 minutes.

3 <> 4 at Neundorf on Monday to Friday whole day and on Sunday from 8 to 17h. No 3 on Sunday after 17h.

== Rolling stock ==
The current fleet consists of 14 Tatra KT4D and nine Flexity Classic NGT6.

Of the 44 KT4D trams delivered to Plauen 14 remained in service as of 2021. They were originally built between 1981 and 1988 and modernised with new chopper control electronics in the early 1990s.

The NGT6 trams were constructed by Bombardier Transportation and are 21 m long and 2.3 m wide with a capacity of 119 passengers. The first two were delivered in August 2013, with another four in 2014 and a final three trams ordered in 2015.

== See also ==
- List of town tramway systems in Germany
- Trams in Germany
