= List of Puerto Rico railroads =

The following is a list of railroads operating in the U.S. Commonwealth of Puerto Rico.

== Current railroads ==
=== Passenger systems ===
- Tren Urbano

== Defunct railroads ==
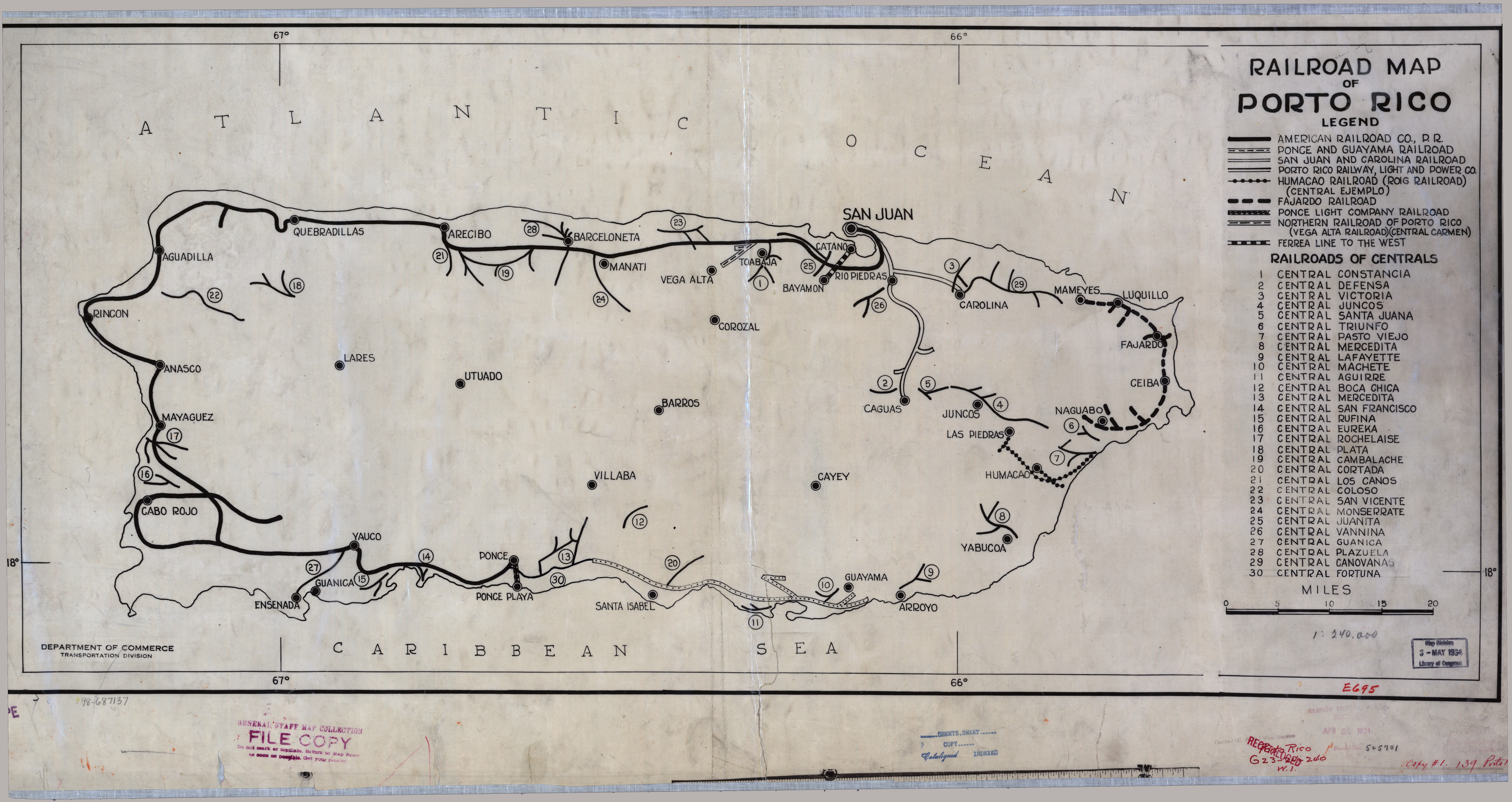
Railroad map of Puerto Rico, 1924.

- Línea Férrea del Oeste
- Compañía de los Ferrocarriles de Puerto Rico
- American Railroad Company of Puerto Rico
- Compañía de Ferrocarriles de Vía Estrecha de Mayagüez
- Fajardo Development Railroad
- Luce & Co. Railroad
- Humacao Railroad
- Northern Railroad of Porto Rico
- Ponce and Guayama Railroad
- Ponce Light Company Railroad
- Porto Rico Railroad and Transportation Company
- Porto Rico Railway, Light and Power Company
- Roig Railroad
- San Juan and Carolina Railroad
- Vega Alta Railroad

=== Tourist railways ===
- Safari Park, Vega Alta in Vega Alta, Puerto Rico
- Divertilandia in Humacao, Puerto Rico
- Ferrocarril Histórico in Fajardo, Puerto Rico
- El Parque del Tren in Bayamon, Puerto Rico
- Train of the South in Arroyo, Puerto Rico

=== Industrial railways ===
- Mona Island Tramway
- Railway of the Blanco River Hydroelectric System in Naguabo, Puerto Rico

=== Central short-lines ===
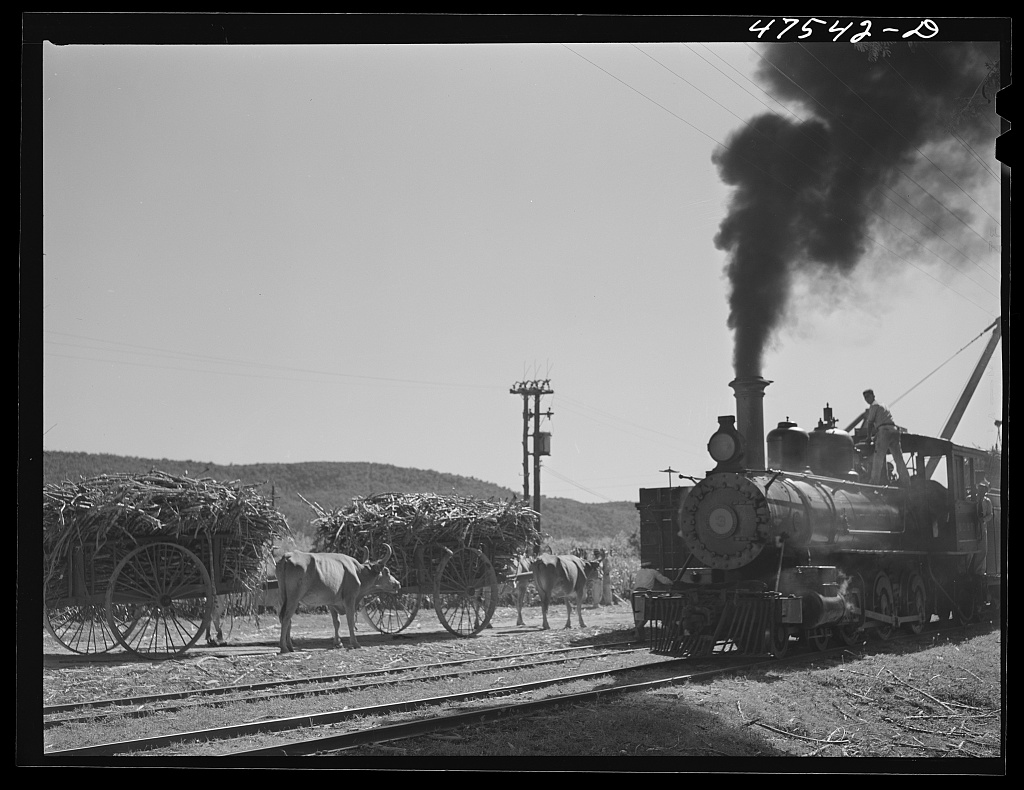
Freight train used in hauling cane to the Central Guanica from loading stations

- Central Aguirre
- Central Boca Chica
- Central Cambalache
- Central Canovanas
- Central Carmen
- Central Coloso
- Central Constancia
- Central Cortada
- Central Defensa
- Central Ejemplo
- Central Eureka
- Central Fortuna
- Central Guánica
- Central Juanita
- Central Juncos
- Central Lafayette
- Central Los Canos
- Central Machete
- Central Mercedita
- Central Monserrate
- Central Pasto Viejo
- Central Plata
- Central Plazuela
- Central Rochelaise
- Central Rufina
- Central San Francisco
- Central San Vicente
- Central Santa Juana
- Central Triunfo
- Central Vannina
- Central Victoria

=== Street railways ===
- Caguas Tramway
- San Juan Light and Transit Company
- Tranvía de la Capital
- Tranvía de Ubarri
- Trolley de San Juan
- Mayagüez Tramway
- Ponce Tramway

== See also ==
- List of United States railroads
- Rail transport in Puerto Rico
- Transportation in Puerto Rico
