= Puerto Rican Ring Railroad =

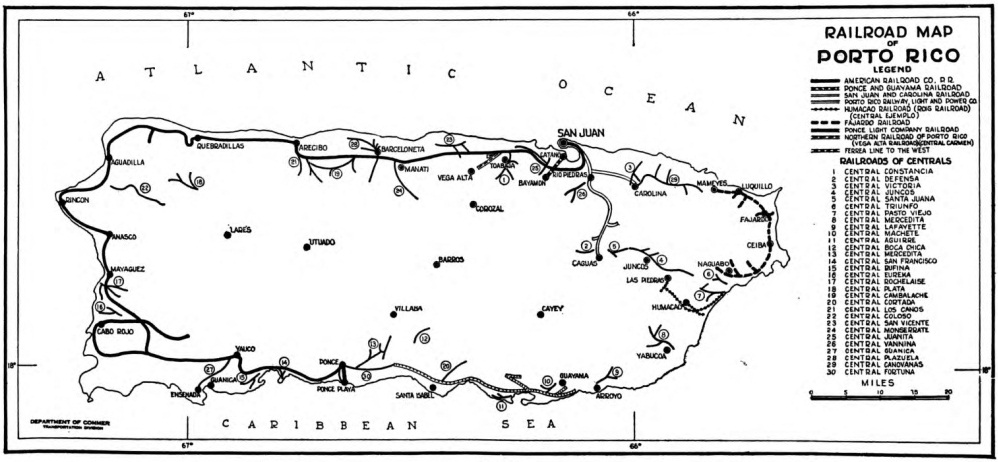
- Railway map of 1925

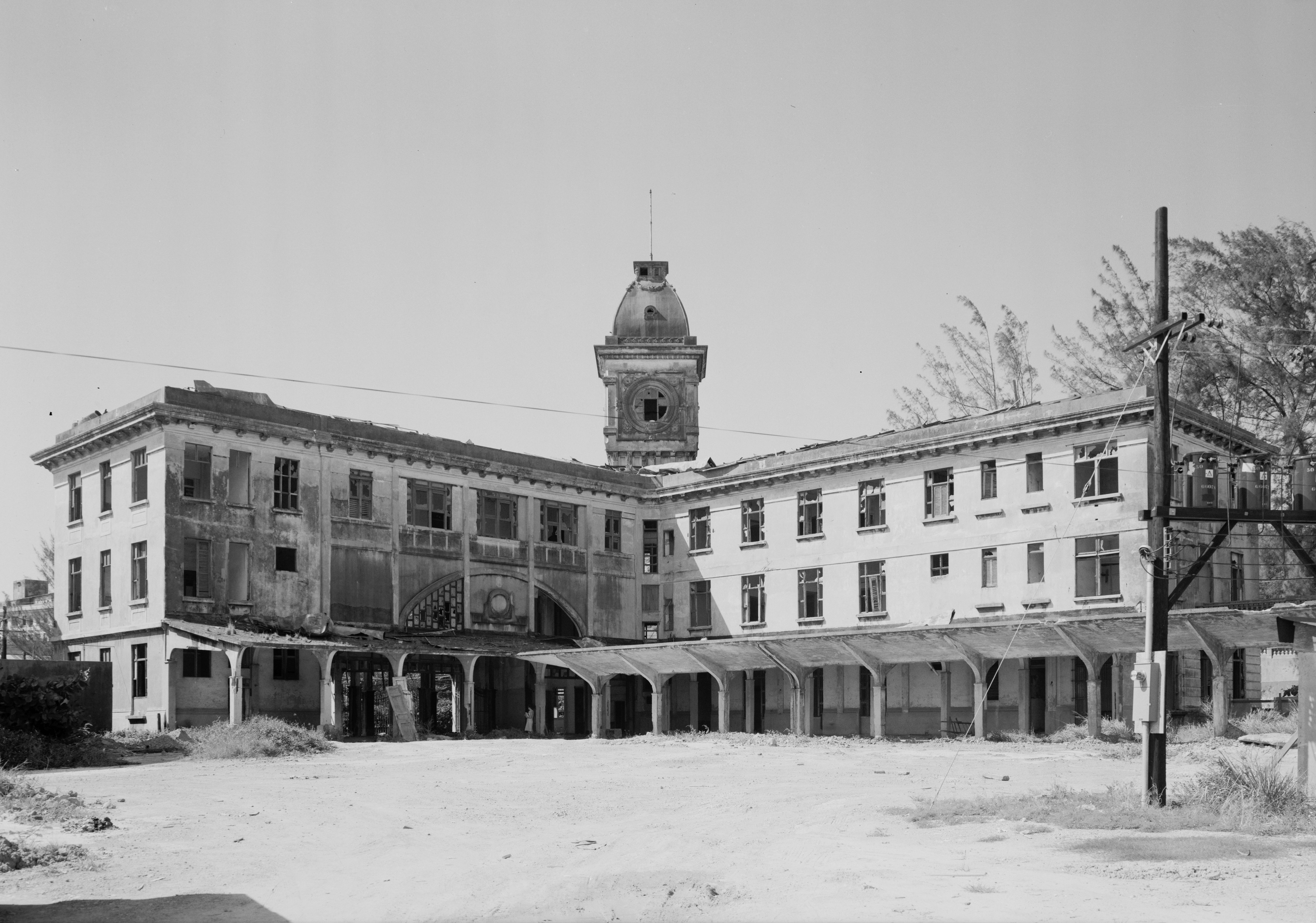
- San Juan Terminal After Abandonment

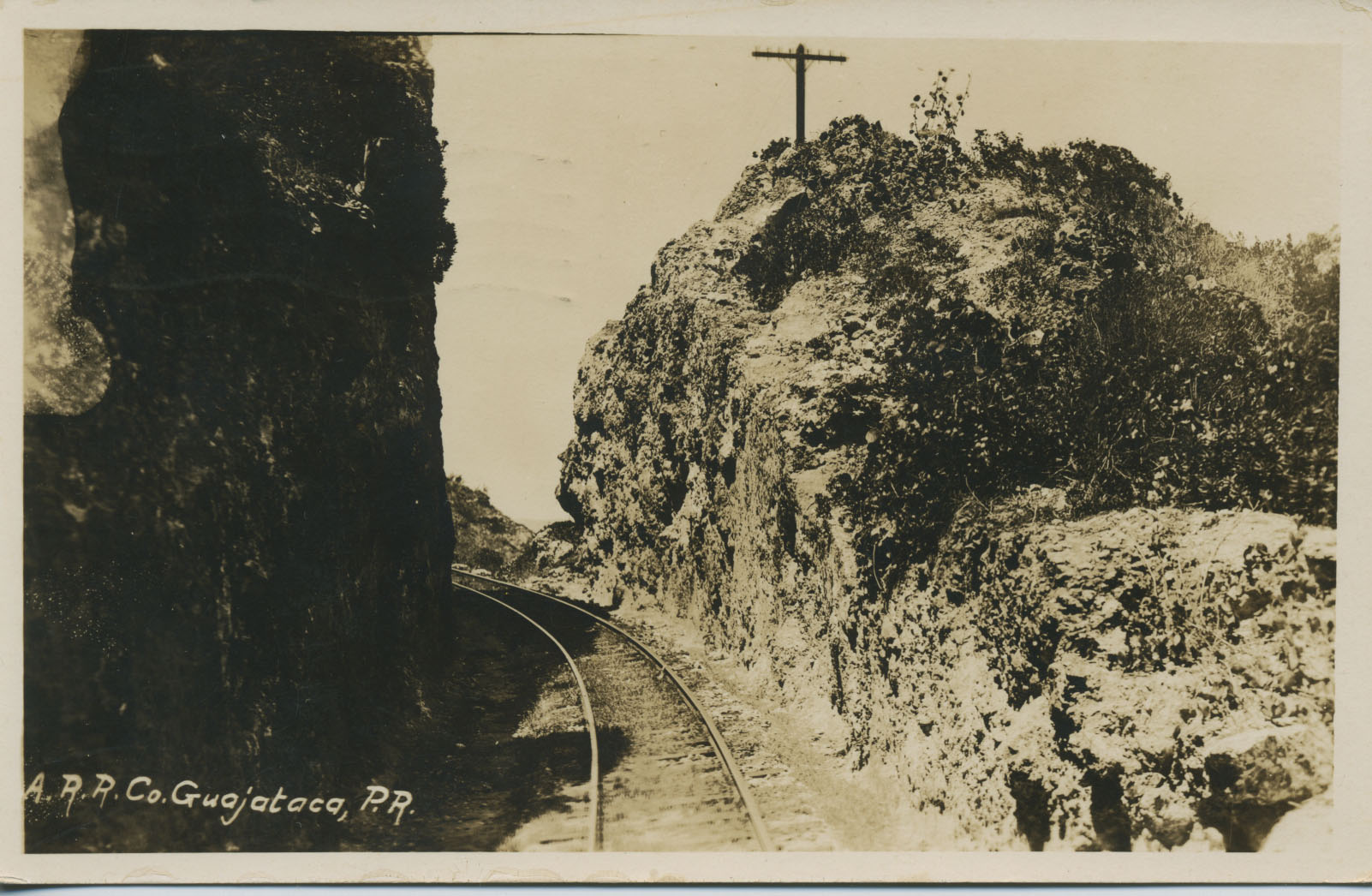
- Right-of-way in Guajataca

Overview
- Owner: Compañía de Ferrocarriles de Puerto Rico
- Locale: Puerto Rico
- Transit type: Railway (closed)
- Number of lines: 1
- Number of stations: 34

Operation
- Began operation: 1891
- Ended operation: 1957
- Operators: Compañía de Ferrocarriles de Puerto Rico (1888–1902) American Railroad Company of Puerto Rico (1902–1947) Puerto Rico Railroad and Transport Company (1947–1957)

Technical
- System length: 370 km
- Track gauge: Metre gauge (1000 mm) (single track)
- Electrification: None

The Puerto Rico Ring Railway (Ferrocarril de Circunvalación de Puerto Rico) was a single-track metre-gauge railway line that linked the cities of San Juan and Ponce along the northern, western, and southern coasts of Puerto Rico. Services were inaugurated in early 1891. It was intimately linked to the sugar industry, and during the first half of the 20th century it served as a key piece of the island's infrastructure, enabling the transport of sugarcane, sugar, mail, passengers, and general cargo. It was eventually supplanted by the development of the road network, closed, and its tracks dismantled.

== History ==
Construction of this railway began on October 15, 1888, following the specifications of the General Railway Plan for Puerto Rico (Plan General de Ferrocarriles para Puerto Rico) of 1880, which provided for construction in four sections: San Juan–Mayagüez, Río Piedras–Humacao, Ponce–Mayagüez, and Ponce–Humacao. It remained under construction in varying capacities for almost 20 years, and the route originally planned was never fully completed. Its operations began along discontinuous stretches in 1891. By 1894 it was in regular service. It ran regularly until 1953 and on a limited basis until 1957.

=== Background ===
Although the General Plan approved in the 1880 budget envisioned the construction of a belt railway along the coast of Puerto Rico—originating from San Juan heading west and linking the island's cities—by 1883 its construction had neither commenced nor been budgeted. Engineer Enrique Gadea of the Public Works Inspection conducted a detailed study to formulate the system's specifications, estimating the total construction cost at 7,644,000 pesos. The railway network was to cover 460 kilometers The final budget, approved in 1885, set the construction cost at 8,724,000 pesetas.

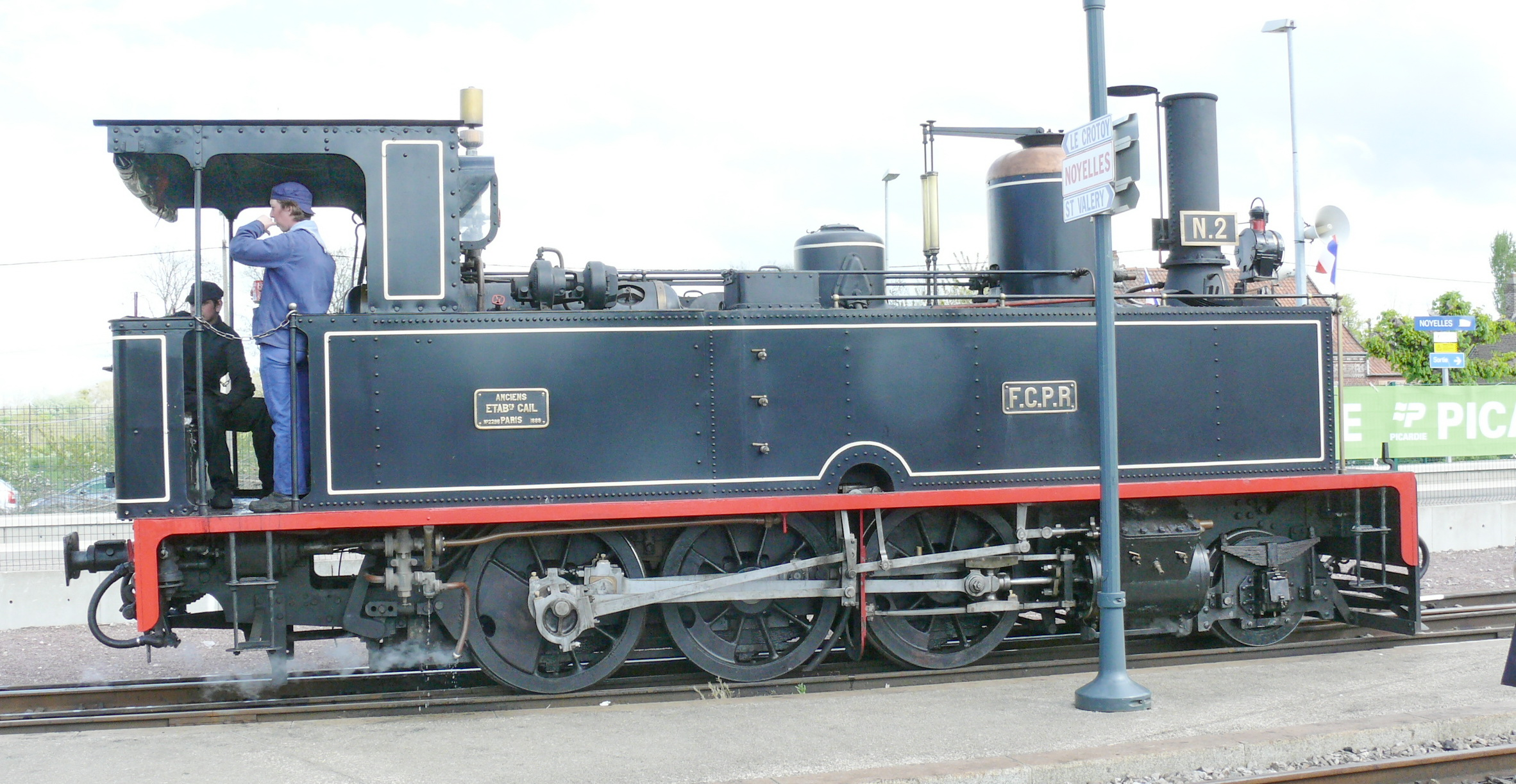
Locomotive Anciens Établissements Cail No. 2, belonging to the Compañía de Ferrocarriles de Puerto Rico until its replacement at the turn of the 20th century, currently preserved on the Somme Bay heritage railway (France)

Following several failed bidding rounds, the Catalan entrepreneur Ivo Bosch y Puig won the contract award. Bosch created the Compañía de Ferrocarriles de Puerto Rico on May 17, 1888, with financing from the French Crédit Mobilier, which transferred the concession. Under the company's auspices, work finally got underway. Actual construction works were subcontracted to a French firm, the Société d'Entreprises et des Constructions des Colonies Espagnoles.

=== Construction (1888–1894) ===
==== Line A ====
- Data taken from the timetable effective January 10, 1891.
- No reliable distance data was found for this period.
- Only bridges exceeding 100 meters in length are shown.

Line A comprised the route running from the San Juan terminal to the city of Aguadilla. It was the first stretch to begin construction, with work starting in mid-October 1888. On March 8, 1891, the first 73-kilometer section between San Juan (Martín Peña) and Manatí was opened; a year later it was extended to Carolina, and from Manatí to Arecibo and Camuy. In Arecibo, the track was initially built only as far as Cambalache Station, situated on the eastern bank of the Río Grande de Arecibo. The route did not enter the city proper until the completion of the Cambalache Bridge, an iron-span bridge 120 meters long. Following its completion in 1892, the route was extended to Camuy.

During the first decade of the 20th century, the 46-meter-long Guajataca Tunnel was built in the municipality of Isabela, and it was not until 1908 that the section through to Aguadilla was completed, given the engineering challenge of crossing the Guajataca River canyon in the area of Quebradillas.

==== Line B ====
According to Gadea's plan, Line B was to cover a route from Río Piedras to Humacao via Fajardo. It was projected to measure 96 kilometers in length. Services were planned to depart from Martín Peña station, passing through Río Piedras, Carolina, Río Grande, Fajardo, Ceiba, and Playa de Naguabo until reaching Humacao. Construction began in 1889. Only 14.5 kilometers were ever completed, terminating at Carolina station. Service started in mid-1892. It suffered recurring issues with its embankments and drainage ditches. Nonetheless, toward 1898 the limited completed section remained operational, linking Carolina with the capital.

==== Line C ====
Line C encompassed the section between Aguadilla and Hormigueros, covering a length of 55 kilometers. Construction began in 1890. In late 1892, the Aguadilla–Mayagüez route was inaugurated, followed the next year by the Mayagüez–Hormigueros stretch with provisional works.

==== Line D ====
- Only bridges exceeding 100 meters in length are shown.

Line D comprised the route between Yauco and Ponce, measuring 34.5 kilometers. It served to export coffee from the Yauco region to the Port of Ponce. In Ponce, it shared tracks in the Playa district with the Ponce Electric Tramway. Its construction began in February 1890, and it opened in July 1892.

=== Suspension of works (1894–1902) ===
The concession granted to the Compañía de Ferrocarriles de Puerto Rico for the construction and operation of the railway had an original term of six years. The entire project was expected to be delivered complete in 1894. However, out of the grand scale envisioned, only the sections described above were ever finished. An official report sent by the Governor to the Ministry of Overseas Affairs in October 1894 announced that the construction work undertaken by the company had come to a standstill. The delay in execution, which made delivering the completed railway within the contractual timeframe impossible, led to the expiration of the franchise and the subsequent halting of construction along this line. By February 1894, when work halted, the company had placed only 190 km of track in revenue service out of the 546 km planned and required by the agreement. The resumption of railway expansion projects would have to wait until 1902, under the management of the American Railroad Co. of Puerto Rico.

== See also ==
- Rail transport in Puerto Rico
- Tren Urbano
