= Train of the South =

Narrow gauge heritage railroad in Puerto Rico

Coordinates: 17.97599°N 66.06280°W

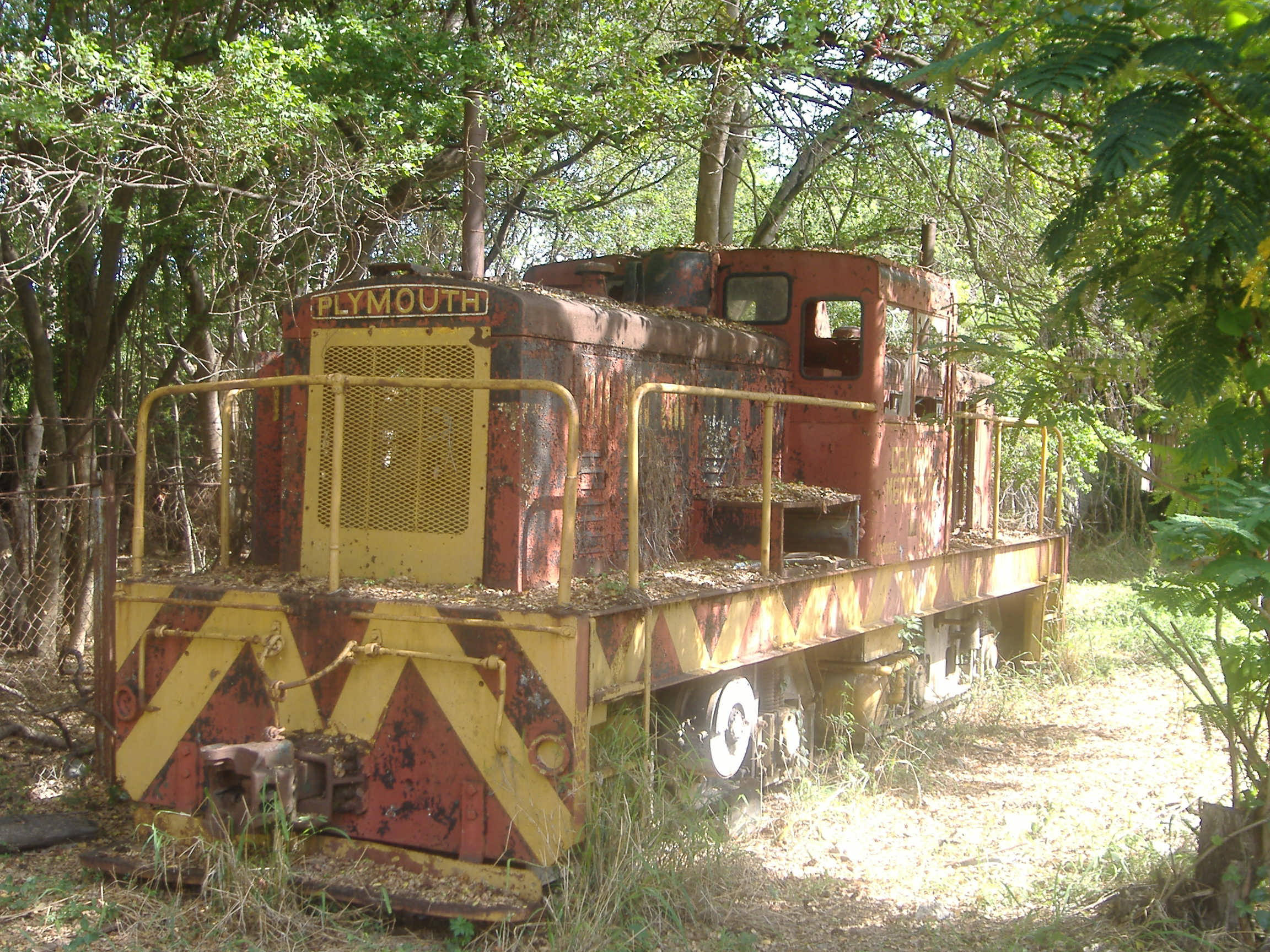
- Mercedita Train, remnant of the Train of the South

Overview
- Headquarters: Arroyo, Puerto Rico
- Locale: Southeastern Puerto Rico
- Dates of operation: 1984–2005 (Pending restoration)

Technical
- Track gauge: 3 ft 3 3/8 in (1,000 mm) (metre gauge)
- Length: 4 mi (6.4 km)

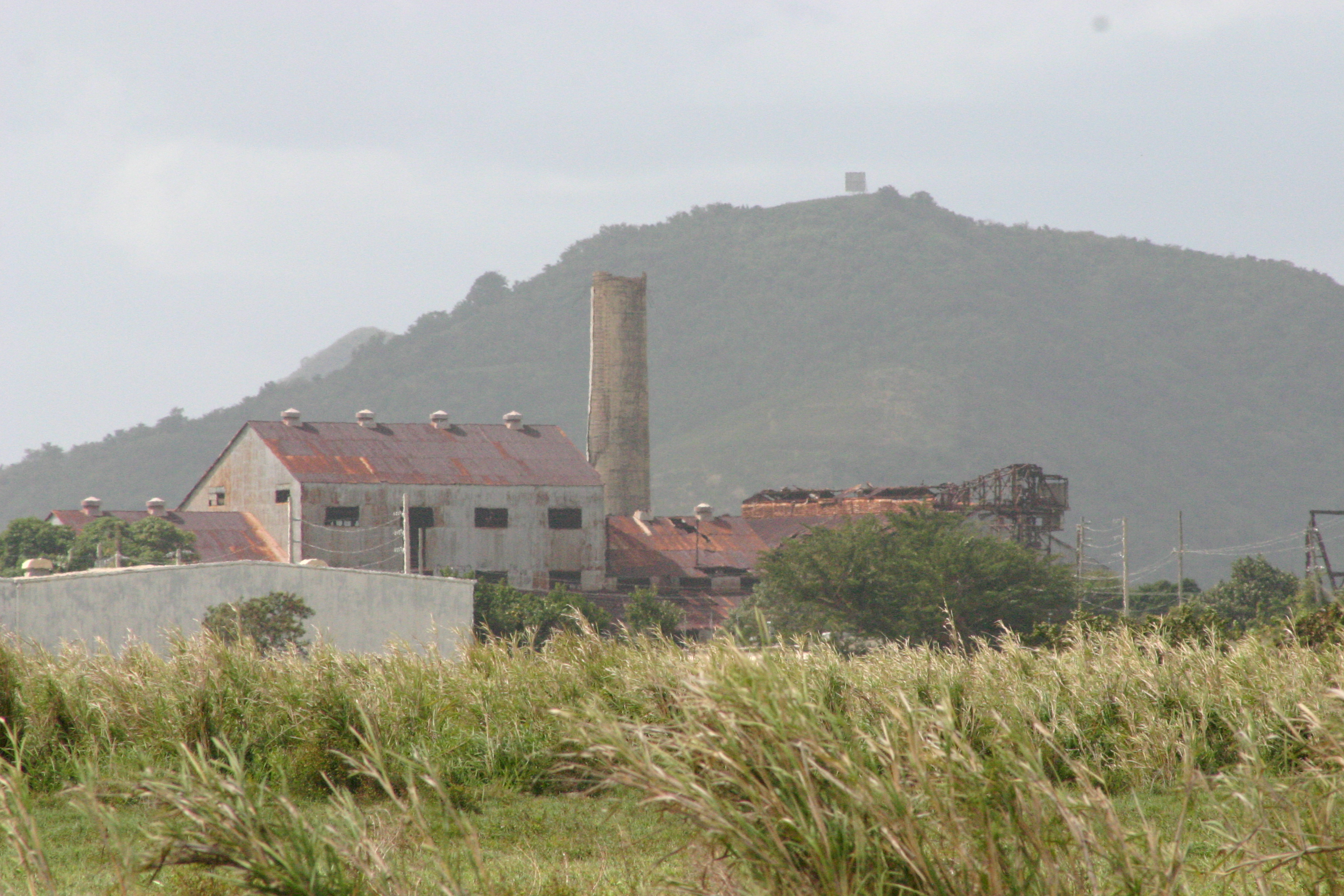
Sugar mill in Arroyo

The Train of the South — or Tren del Sur in Spanish — was a historic 1,000 mm (3 ft 3 3/8 in) narrow gauge heritage railroad that operated within the U.S. commonwealth of Puerto Rico in Arroyo. It was formed in 1984 to preserve the last surviving sugar cane plantation line still in existence on the entire island, which was part of a large railroad system that operated around Puerto Rico prior to the 1950s.

== Overview ==
The railroad took passengers and sightseers across Arroyo's old sugar cane fields on a fifty-minute long guided tour that explained the industry and other historic aspects of it. Most of the original railroad right-of-way is former Ponce & Guayama trackage, which was in regular use up until 1990; a short 4-mile (6.4 km) segment became the Tren del Sur in 1984. Much of the original equipment abandoned on site also served as historic props along the route.

After a temporary shutdown in 1988, former Arroyo's mayor Reinaldo Pirela obtained funds from Puerto Rico's government to refit tracks and the transfer of eight Plymouth locomotives from Central Aguirre's stock to restart successful operations in 1996. In 2005, the railroad was temporarily shutdown pending a major restoration project; although all work has been halted in recent years afterwards for unknown reasons. However, the Department of the Interior has plans to re-commission the railroad and extend the system further sometime in the near future. To enforce legal protection of the Tren del Sur, the Puerto Rico Legislative Branch first approved the Law 118-1995 and later the Law 212-2014 that superseded the 1995 law, but both laws failed to keep the train running.

Reinaldo Pirela's successor, former Arroyo's mayor Basilio Figueroa (term: 2003-2013), found the Tren del Sur operations too expensive for the Arroyo's municipal budget. As a result of past unaccomplished promises of financial assistance from Puerto Rican Legislative and Executive Branches, mayor Figueroa signed a contract with Progressive Southern Railway Inc. (a local company just incorporated in 2005) to refurbish and manage the Tren del Sur. When Progressive Southern Railway took control of the Tren del Sur assets in November 2005 under the premise that the "rails needed to be refitted", they dismantled nearly all of the tracks along the 4-mile (6.4 km) route to "send to the United States for refurbishment"; after this, the historical train never resumed operations. Progressive Southern Railway Inc. sued the Arroyo Municipality for remaking a complement of accords, because the Land Authority of Puerto Rico never transferred property of right-of-way to the Municipal Government of Arroyo, asking for $2.5 million in compensation. In 2011, the Arroyo Municipality realized that the lawsuit costs were too expensive, and settled paying $100,000 to Progressive Southern Railway Inc.

== Rolling stock ==
A number of vintage and historic rolling stock equipment exists around the grounds of the Train of the South. Locomotives that once operated the tourist trains until 2005 consist of original plantation-era Plymouth Locomotive Works diesel switcher engines which range from five 18-ton engines to three 40-ton locomotives. The 40-ton Plymouth's are all painted in a direct mirror of the old Atchison, Topeka and Santa Fe Railway red and silver Warbonnet scheme, including the yellow Santa Fe "cigar band" logo with the railroad's name painted within it. Engine #18 was the main locomotive used on all tourist runs, it pulled several converted flatcars with custom built interiors to allow for seating of passengers. Along the route, many of the sidings are filled with abandoned sugar cane related freight cars.

=== Engine Roster ===
External images
- Puerto Rico Railroad – Plymouth An image of Tren del Sur's #18 Plymouth.
- Puerto Rico Railroad – Rolling Stock Abandoned sugar cane tank cars along the Tren del Sur railroad line.
- Flickr – Tren del Sur A former Whitcomb industrial switcher displayed outside the main entrance.

Model	Quantity	Built	Numbers	Notes
Whitcomb 7-ton	1	1939	TS 1	This is a former Whitcomb industrial switcher modified with a custom steam-engine carbody; it currently sits on display outside the main entrance.
Plymouth 18-ton JCD	4			The railroad had a handful of these 18-ton Plymouth switchers, though only three are left on site and in disrepair as of 2009.
Plymouth 18-ton JCD	1		TS 15	This smaller Plymouth switcher was later moved and put on display outside the Bacardí Distillery in Cataño. It is lettered for the Ponce & Guayama railroad.
Plymouth 40-ton WLD	2		TS 16-17	These are two nearly identical engines to #18, both are in disrepair as of 2009.
Plymouth 40-ton WDT	1	1954	TS 18	This was the primary engine used on all of the railroad's tourist runs; it has been inactive since 2005 after the railroad was mothballed.

== See also ==
- List of heritage railroads in the United States
- Rail transport in Puerto Rico
- Metre-gauge railway
