= Guajataca =

Guajataca may refer to:

- Guajataca Lake, a reservoir located between the municipalities of San Sebastián, Quebradillas and Isabela, Puerto Rico
- Guajataca River, a river that crosses the municipalities of Lares, San Sebastián and Isabela, Puerto Rico and ends at the Guajataca Lake
- Guajataca Tunnel, a railroad tunnel that connected the town of Isabela and Quebradillas, Puerto Rico
- Guajataka Scout Reservation, a camping reservation owned and operated by the Puerto Rico Council of the Boy Scouts of America
- Guajataca State Forest, in Isabela, Puerto Rico
- Guajataca, Quebradillas, Puerto Rico, a barrio
- Guajataca, San Sebastián, Puerto Rico, a barrio
