= Ferrocarril Histórico de Puerto Rico =

Former heritage railway in Fajardo, Puerto Rico

Overview
- Headquarters: Road PR-195, Km 4.2, Fajardo, Puerto Rico
- Locale: Eastern Puerto Rico
- Dates of operation: 1971–1974

Technical
- Track gauge: 3 ft 3 3/8 in (1,000 mm) (metre gauge)
- Length: 4.6 mi (7.4 km)

The Historical Railway of Puerto Rico — or Ferrocarril Histórico de Puerto Rico in Spanish — was a historic 1,000 mm (3 ft 3 3/8 in) narrow gauge heritage railroad operating within Puerto Rico, an Insular area of the United States. It was located in Fajardo between 1971 and 1975.

== History ==
Jorge Wirshing (grandson of sugar-cane growers, with a bachelor and master in Business Management and work experience for Serrallés Distillery in Ponce) first bought in 1937 the Glover-2-6-2T locomotive from Mercedita Sugar Mill at Ponce for US$581.25 and later the Baldwin 2-8-0 locomotive in 1967 from C. Brewer of Puerto Rico (after withdrawn from service in sugar-cane hauling railway between Pasto Viejo Sugar Mill (Humacao), Juncos Sugar Mill and Santa Juanita Sugar Mill (Caguas), where it was finally stored) for purpose of developing an heritage railroad to attract tourists on steam engine railroading in a time when steam-powered locomotives in Puerto Rico's sugar-mill railways were replaced by diesel-powered ones.

Meanwhile, in 1970, Mr. Wirshing got a loan from Fomento (Puerto Rico Economic Development Administration) and permits from Land Authority of Puerto Rico for using the Paraiso branch (southwest of Fajardo Sugar Mill) of the former Fajardo Development Company Railroad now owned by the Puerto Rican Government attached to Central Fajardo operations.

In April 1971 started the construction of the spur for storage of Glover and Baldwin locomotives, water and fuel tanks and the station building for Ferrocarril Histórico office, ticket window, washrooms, souvenir shop and cafeteria. After months of trial runs and refitting five Gregg cane cars to passenger wagons, the tourist train started passenger rides on September 4, 1971. Because the sugar harvest, from January to June the Ferrocarril Histórico operated Sundays only; the rest of year it operated on Friday, Saturday, Sunday and certain holidays. The adult fare was US$1.75 and the ride took about one hour. The scheduled ride hours are: 11:00am – 12:30pm – 2:10pm – 3:40pm – 5:00pm.

=== Engine Roster ===
In 1972, the locomotive inventory in the Ferrocarril Histórico consisted of eight steam engines:

- Baldwin 2-8-0 Locomotive, ex-Central Pasto Viejo engine No. 8 (9-1927) (36-tons) (Central Juncos No. 8, Eastern Sugar Associates No. 8, Fajardo Eastern Sugar Associates No. 8)(ex-C. Brewer of PR E462), called "Luisa".
- Glover 2-6-2T Locomotive, ex-Central Mercedita C No. 4 (1925) (27-ton), called "Marietta".
- Baldwin 2-8-0 Locomotive, ex-Ponce and Guayama Railroad engine No. 7 (12-1917)
- Baldwin 2-8-0 Locomotive, ex-Ponce and Guayama Railroad engine No. 8 (10-1920) (ex-Central Los Caños No. 1, "Bayaney")
- Baldwin 2-8-0 Locomotive, ex-Ponce and Guayama Railroad engine No. 13 (1-1924) (34-tons)
- Porter 0-6-0T Locomotive, ex-Melchior, Armstrong & Dessau (11-1912) (ex-Central Canovanas No. 7) (ex-Fajardo Eastern Sugar Associates No. 7) (ex-C. Brewer of PR E451)
- Porter 2-8-2 Locomotive, ex-Central Pasto Viejo engine No. 9 (8-1927) (45-tons) (ex-Central Juncos No. 9) (ex-Eastern Sugar Associates No. 9) (ex-Fajardo Eastern Sugar Associates No. 9) (ex-C. Brewer of PR E463)
- Alco-Schenectady 2-8-0 Locomotive, ex-L.W.& P. Armstrong (12-1935) (52-tons) (ex-Fajardo Development engine No. 9) (ex-Fajardo Eastern Sugar Associates No. 19) (ex-C. Brewer of PR E451)

== Closure and fate of steam engines ==
As result of flood damages on October 25, 1974, the Ferrocarril Histórico facilities were damaged, forcing its permanent closure for a lack of financial help from insurance, the government, and banks. To liquidate debts from operations, the two Glover 2-6-2T Locomotive and Baldwin 2-8-0 Locomotive steam engines were sold and sent on April 9, 1976, to the Museo del Transporte (Transport Museum) in Caracas, Venezuela, where are in exhibition with the historical locomotives stock of the museum.

== Sources ==
- Pumarada, Luis (1988). Contexto histórico del ferrocarril en Puerto Rico [Historical context of the railroad in Puerto Rico] (in Spanish). Mayagüez, Puerto Rico: Centro de Investigaciones de Ingeniería, Recinto Universitario de Mayagüez.
- Deyo, Dave (June 30, 2011). "Conservando una Romántica Tradición" [Keeping a Beautiful Tradition]. Railroading. Number 43, Second Quarter, 1972. Retrieved 18 February 2021.
- Aponte, Roger (January 13, 2012). "Ferrocarril Histórico de Puerto Rico, Fajardo, meter gauge. Closed / Cerrado". Railroads of Puerto Rico / Ferrocarriles de Puerto Rico (Web Blog). (Photos of the Ferrocarril Histórico station and railway equipment before and after damage by floods. Note: In original publication, is cited: "Damage by Tropical Storm Eloisa (1975)" but this storm came one year later than actual rivers floods that damaged the Ferrocarril Histórico park and machinery in October 1974.)
- Aponte, Roger (June 4, 2012). "Fajardo Historic RR / Ferrocarril Histórico de Fajardo". Railroads of Puerto Rico / Ferrocarriles de Puerto Rico (Web Blog). (Personal narration of Roger Aponte about experiencies in the Ferrocarril Histórico.)
- Ruiz, Héctor (November 23, 2013). "Pasto Viejo Baldwin 2-8-0 numero 8 - La Luisa - Ayer y hoy" [Pasto Viejo Sugar Mill's Baldwin 2-8-0 steam locomotive nicknamed "La Luisa"]. Redescubriendo a Puerto Rico ( Rediscovering Puerto Rico - Web Blog) (in Spanish). (Entry about the Baldwin 2-8-0 Locomotive "Luisa" steam engine of the Ferrocarril Histórico posted on January 31, 2014.) (in Spanish)
- Aponte, Roger (January 31, 2014). "Caracas Transport Museum, Venezuela – Dos locomotoras de Puerto Rico / Two engines from Puerto Rico". Railroads of Puerto Rico / Ferrocarriles de Puerto Rico (Web Blog). (Entry about the fate of the two Ferrocarril Histórico's former Glover Locomotive and Baldwin Locomotive steam engines now in the Caracas Transport Museum in Venezuela.)
- Aponte, Roger (May 28, 2014). "Ferrocarril Histórico de Puerto Rico". Railroads of Puerto Rico / Ferrocarriles de Puerto Rico (Web Blog). (Brochure, full color photos and map of the Ferrocarril Histórico.)
- Aponte, Roger (May 28, 2014). "Fajardo Development Company". Railroads of Puerto Rico / Ferrocarriles de Puerto Rico (Web Blog). (Note: The Fajardo Development Company was the sugar company who owned the Fajardo Sugar Mill and the tracks used by the Ferrocarril Histórico.)
- Luis M. Géigel, Luis E. Salazar, Hermán H. Wirshing & Jorge J. Wirshing (16 June 2019). Ferrocarril Histórico de Puerto Rico - Videos del Parque. Fajardo, Puerto Rico [Videos from Historical Railroad Park, Fajardo, Puerto Rico] (in Spanish). Fajardo, Puerto Rico: Hermán H. Wirshing. (Original footage of the Ferrocarril Histórico Park and train in movement.)
