= American Railroad Company =

Railroad in Puerto Rico

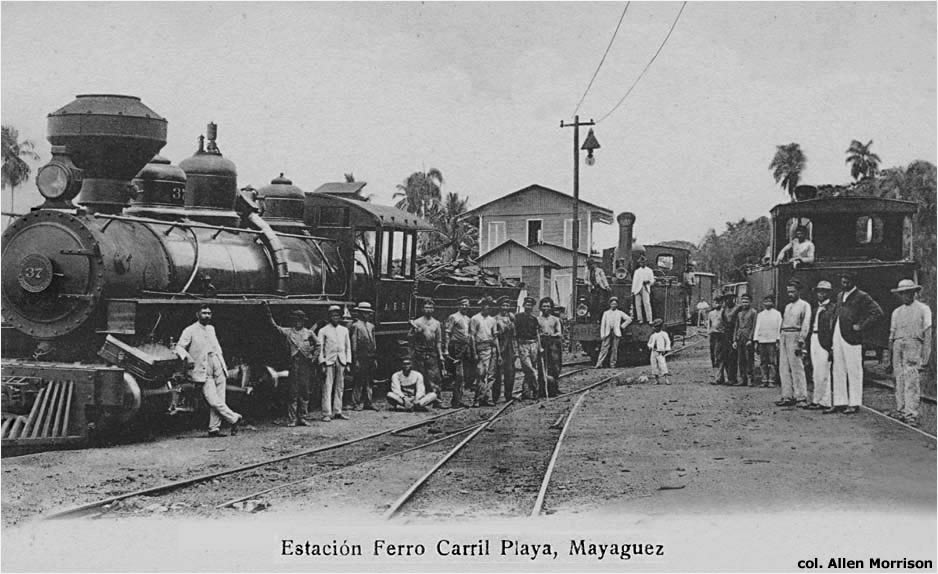
- Baldwin locomotive Estacion Ferro Carril Playa, Mayaguez, c. 1905

Overview
- Locale: Puerto Rico
- Dates of operation: 1902–1957

Technical
- Length: 168 miles (270 km)

The American Railroad Company (ARR) owned and operated a railroad in Puerto Rico.

== History ==
The ARR was set up in 1902 to take-over 168 mi (270 km) of railroad tracks that existed, when the United States invaded Puerto Rico in 1898. It was reorganized in 1947 as Puerto Rico Railroad & Transport Co. It discontinued passenger service in 1953 and ended all rail operations in 1957.
