= Ponce and Guayama Railroad =

Railway in Puerto Rico

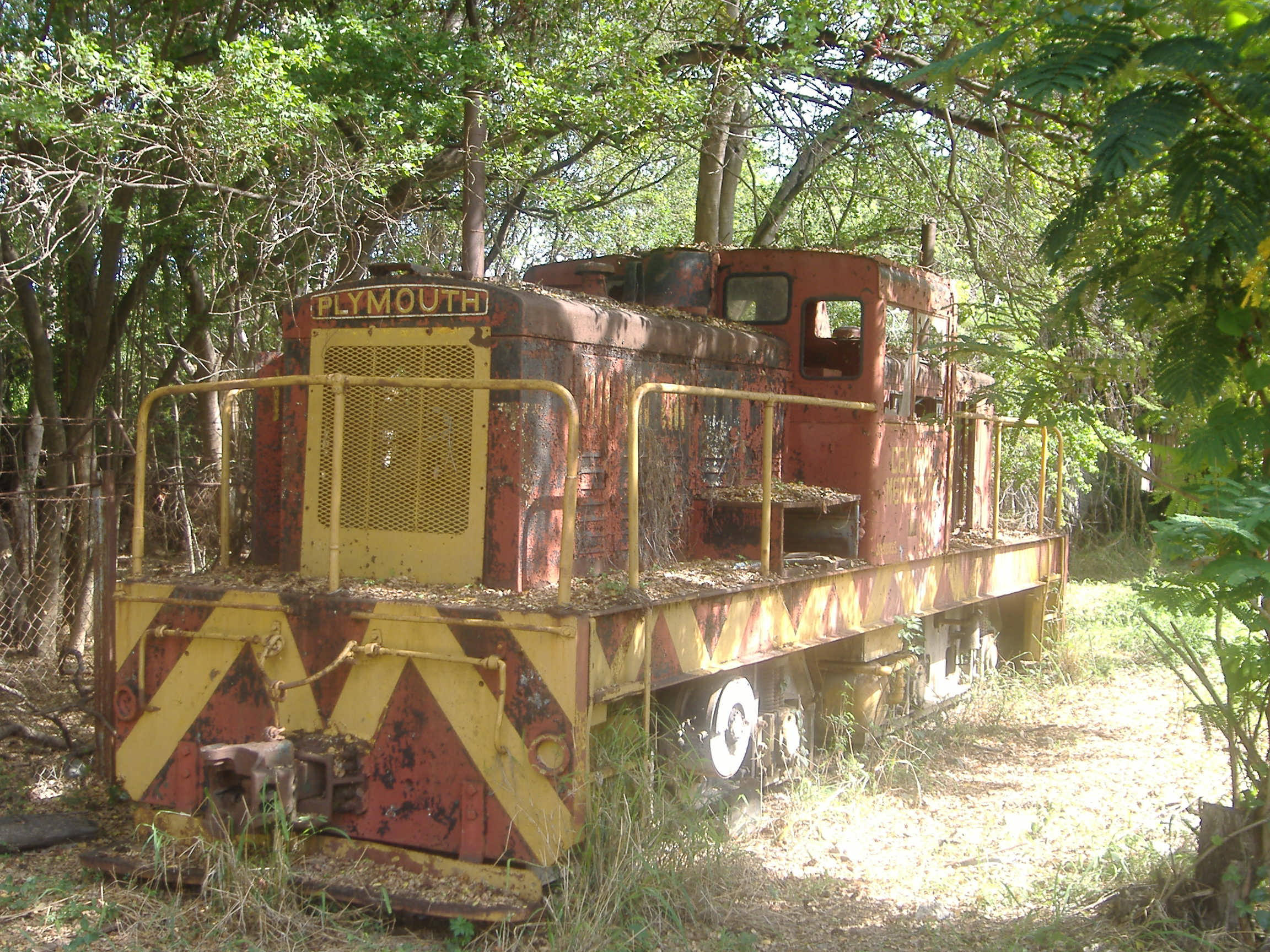
- An old abandoned Plymouth locomotive in Ponce from Ponce and Guayama Railroad, similar to those used along the Train of the South

Overview
- Headquarters: Central Aguirre, Salinas, Puerto Rico
- Locale: Southern Puerto Rico
- Dates of operation: 1904–1990

Technical
- Track gauge: 3 ft 3 3/8 in (1,000 mm) (metre gauge)
- Length: 60 mi (97 km)

The Ponce and Guayama Railroad is an abandoned railroad in Puerto Rico, primarily used to transport products of a sugar mill in Ponce, Puerto Rico. Operating from 1910 to 1990, it was the last sugar mill railroad in Puerto Rico. The railroad used a one-meter track gauge and had a mainline track length of 30.4 miles.

== History ==
Passenger service on the railroad was inaugurated on 1 October 1910. It was initially named American Railroad Co. of Porto Rico, Aguirre Operator.

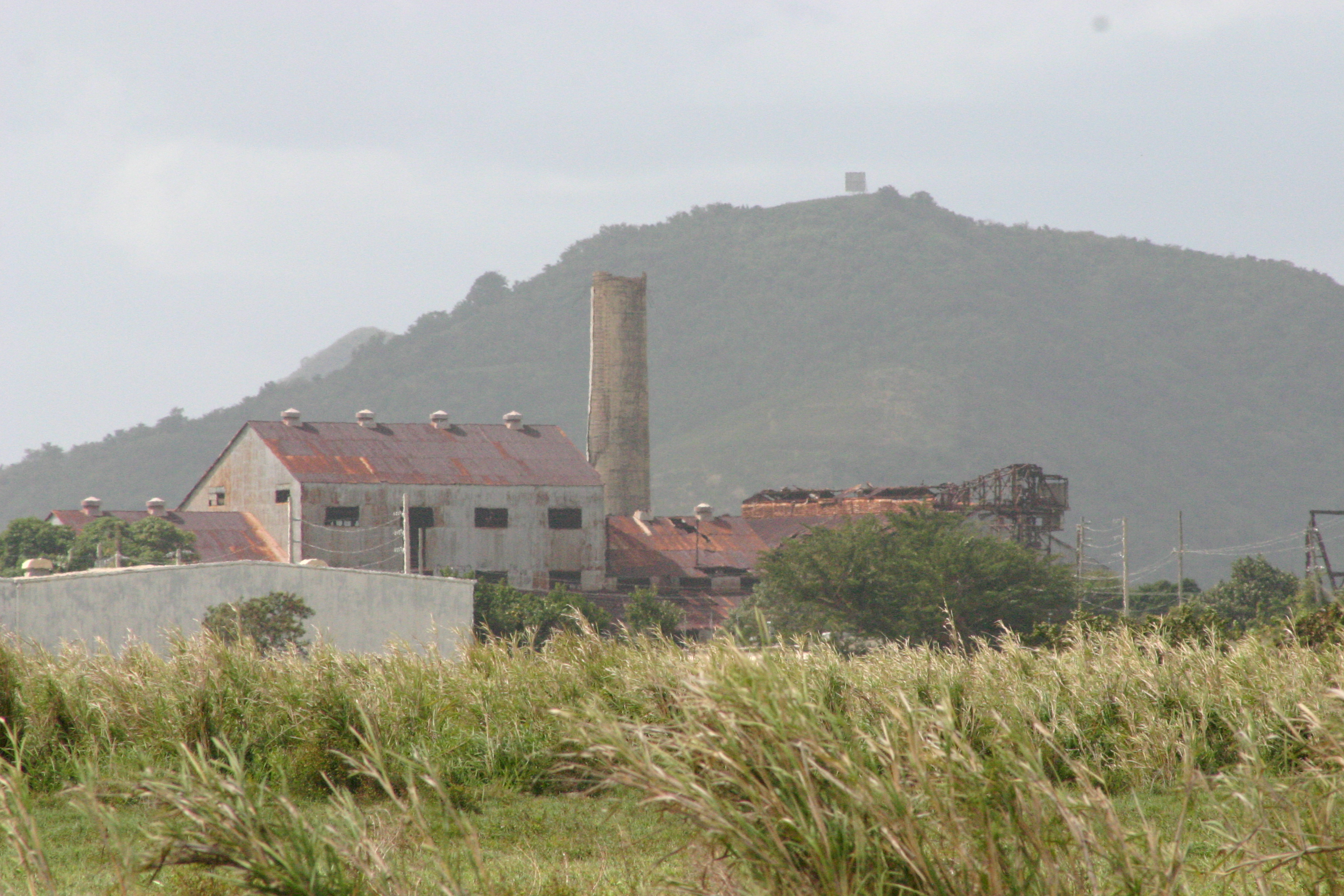
Start point of the Railroad at Central Lafayette in Arroyo.

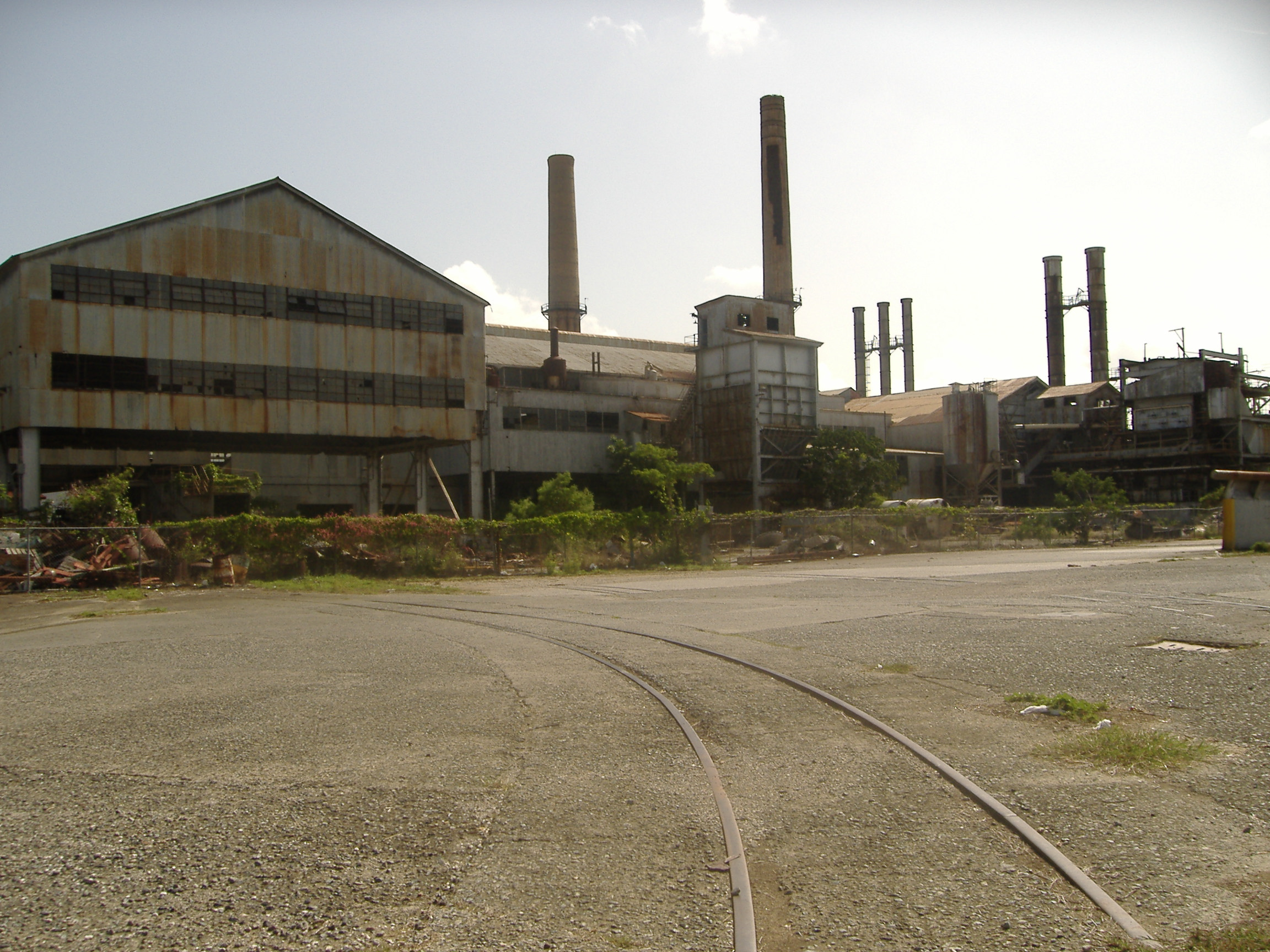
End point of the Railroad at Central Mercedita in Ponce.
