= Guajataca Tunnel =

Historic railroad tunnel in Quebradillas, Puerto Rico

Coordinates: 18.4900°N 66.9598°W

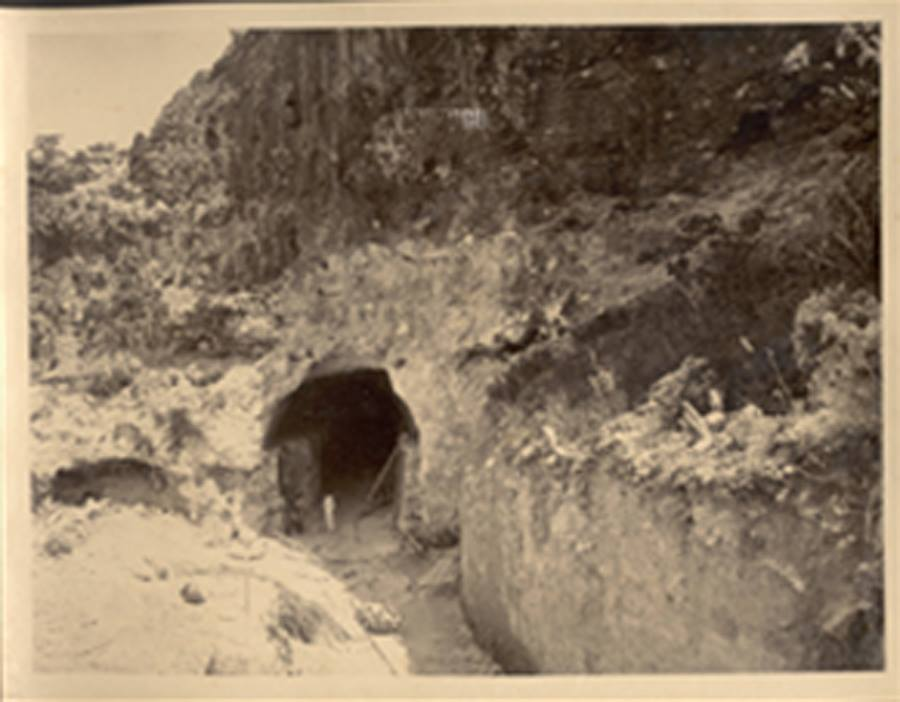
Isabela Puerto Rico-Guajataca Tunnel-Construction circa 1904–1905

Guajataca Tunnel is a railroad tunnel that connected the town of Isabela and Quebradillas, Puerto Rico. The tunnel is one of the most significant work of the remnants of the national railway system that connected the island during the first half of the twentieth century. In 2000, the Government of Puerto Rico declared it a historical monument.

== History ==
The American Railroad Co. of Puerto Rico began construction of the tunnel around 1904 during the expansion of the northern line towards the west of the island. The tunnel connected the towns of Quebradillas and Isabela on the Guajataca River canyon. The construction was completed with the excavation of two tunnels on each side of the canyon. They were joined by a steel viaduct 250 feet (76.2 m) long at an elevation of 131 feet (40 m) above the river level.

The tunnel is open to the public but it is fairly isolated. The tunnel leads to "Guajataca beach" known for its white sand, raging surf, and dangerous turbulent waters.

Concerts are sometimes held at the Guajataca Tunnel. In 2019, virtual tours of Guajataca Tunnel, were organized by Discover Puerto Rico, the marketing arm of the Puerto Rico Department of Tourism.

== Gallery ==
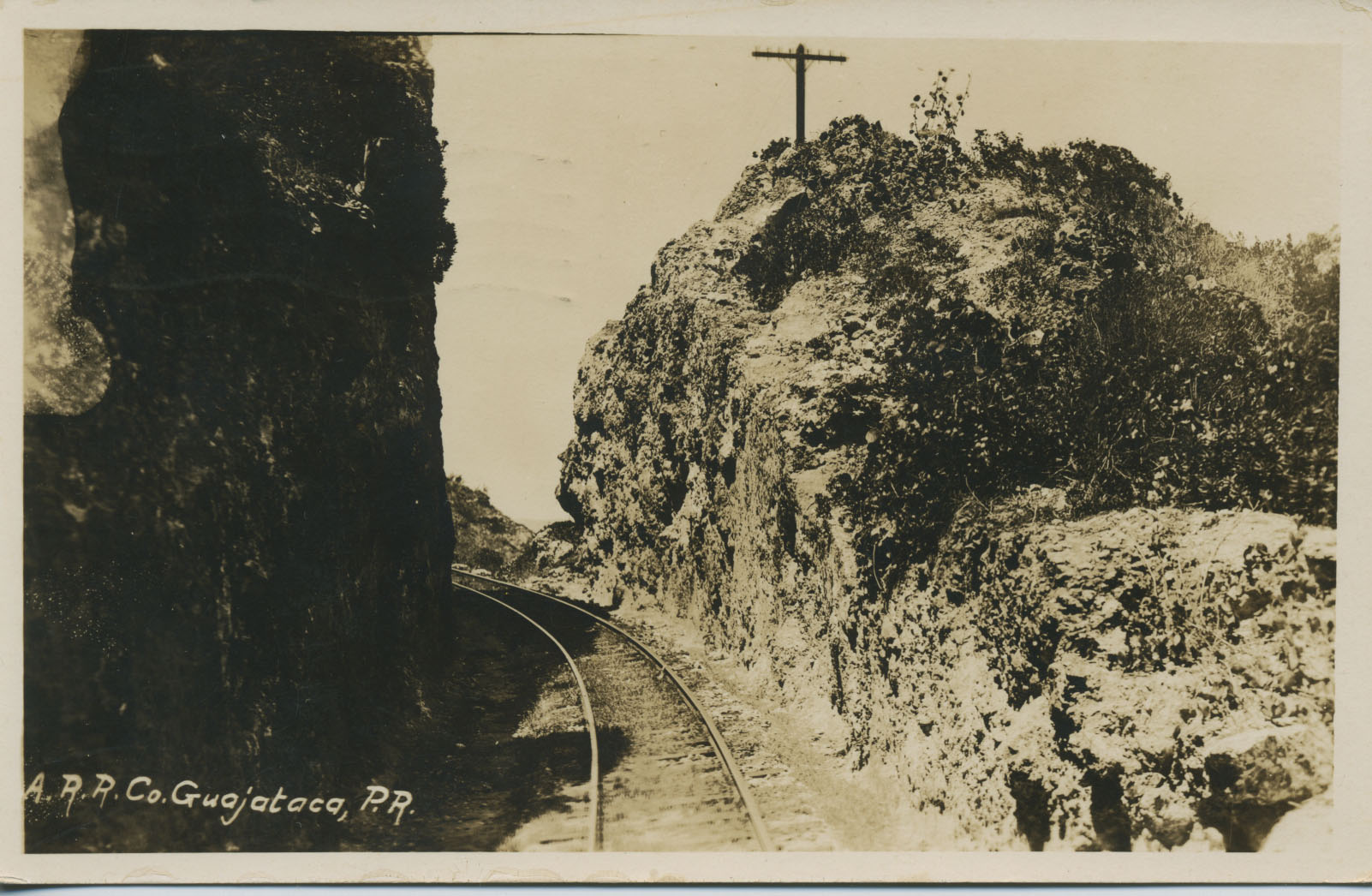
American Railroad Company, Guajataca

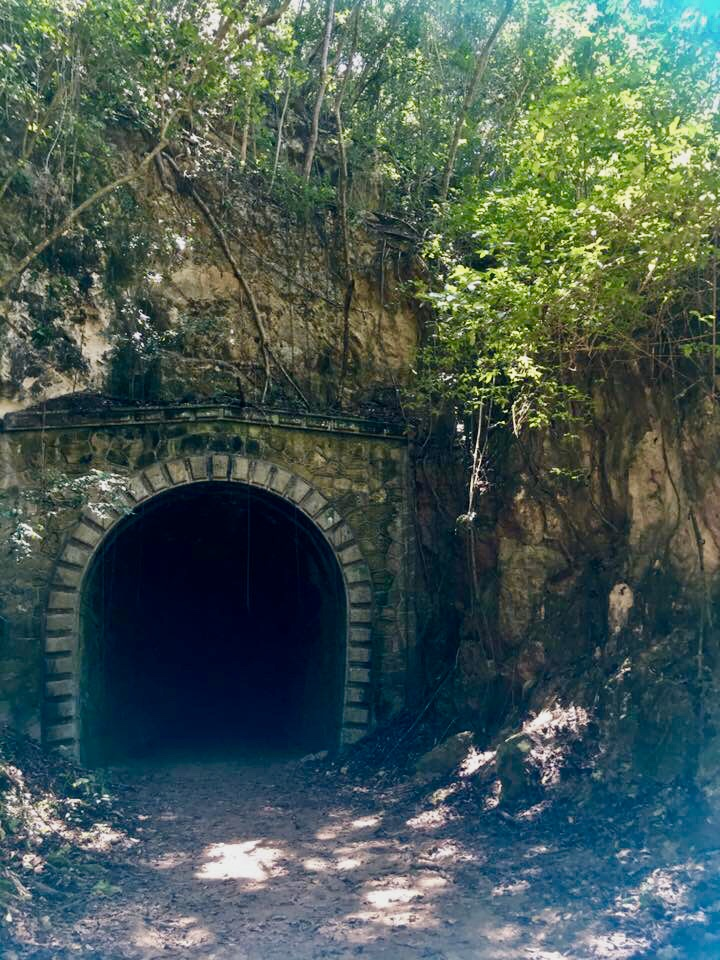
The entrance to the tunnel in 2018

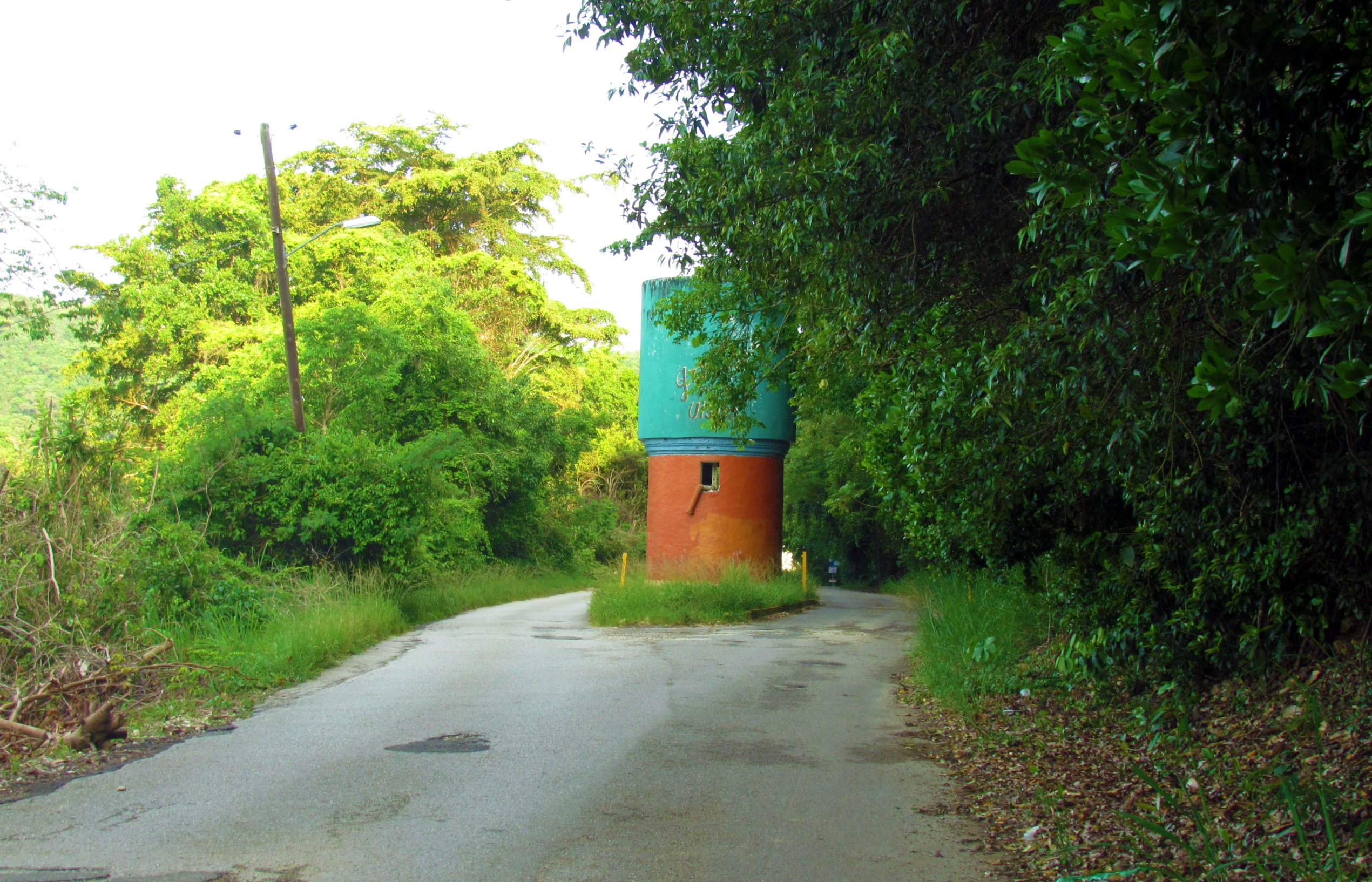
Small structure at the start of the trail that leads to the tunnel

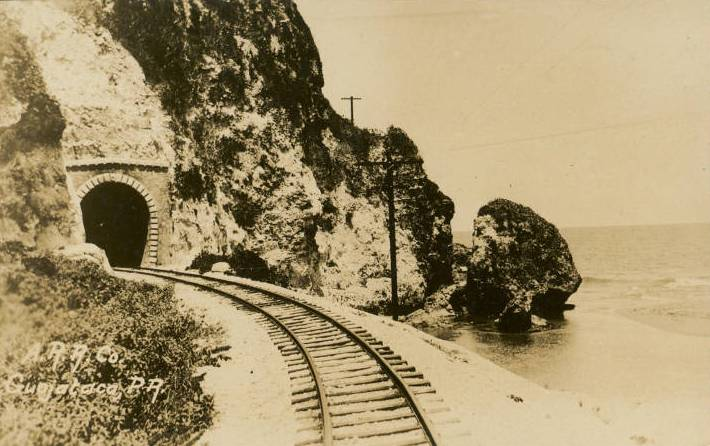
Guajataca Tunnel, c. 1910–1920

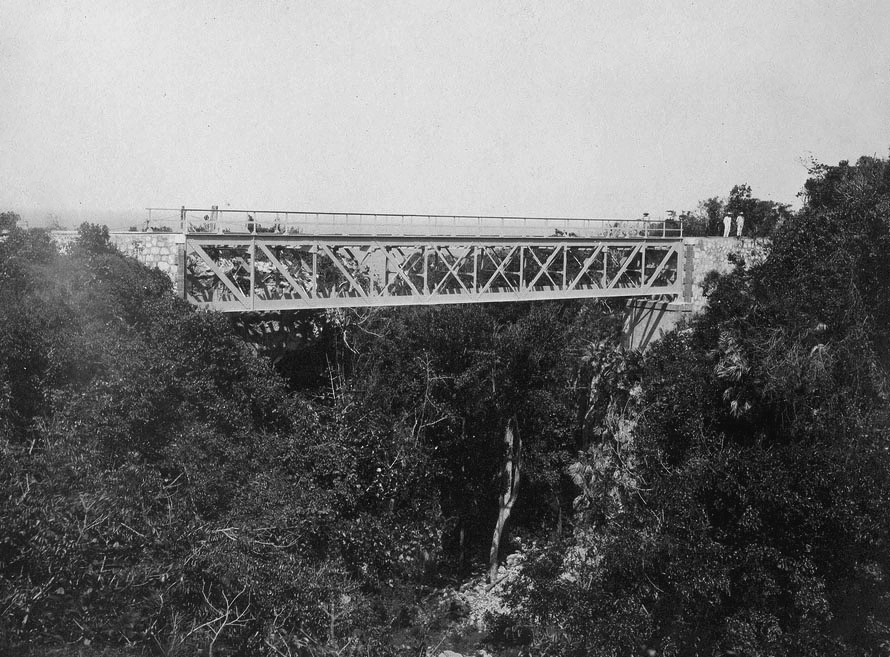
Train Bridge (Steel Viaduct) Connecting the Guajataca Tunnel, Isabela-Quebradillas, Puerto Rico, circa 1904

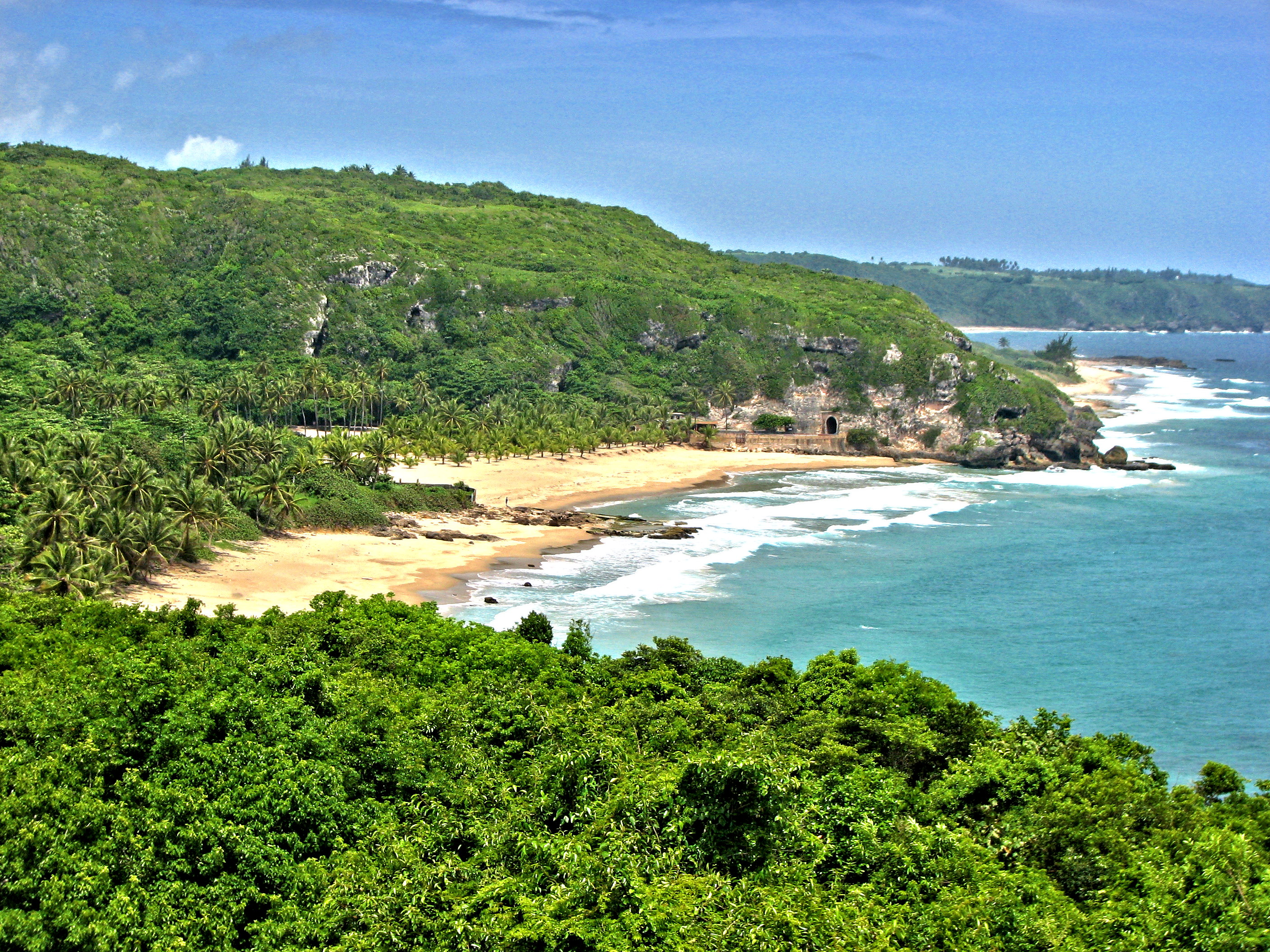
View of the coastline of Quebradillas, Puerto Rico near the tunnel entrance

== See also ==
- Puente Blanco
