= Stadler Tramlink =

Tram vehicle family

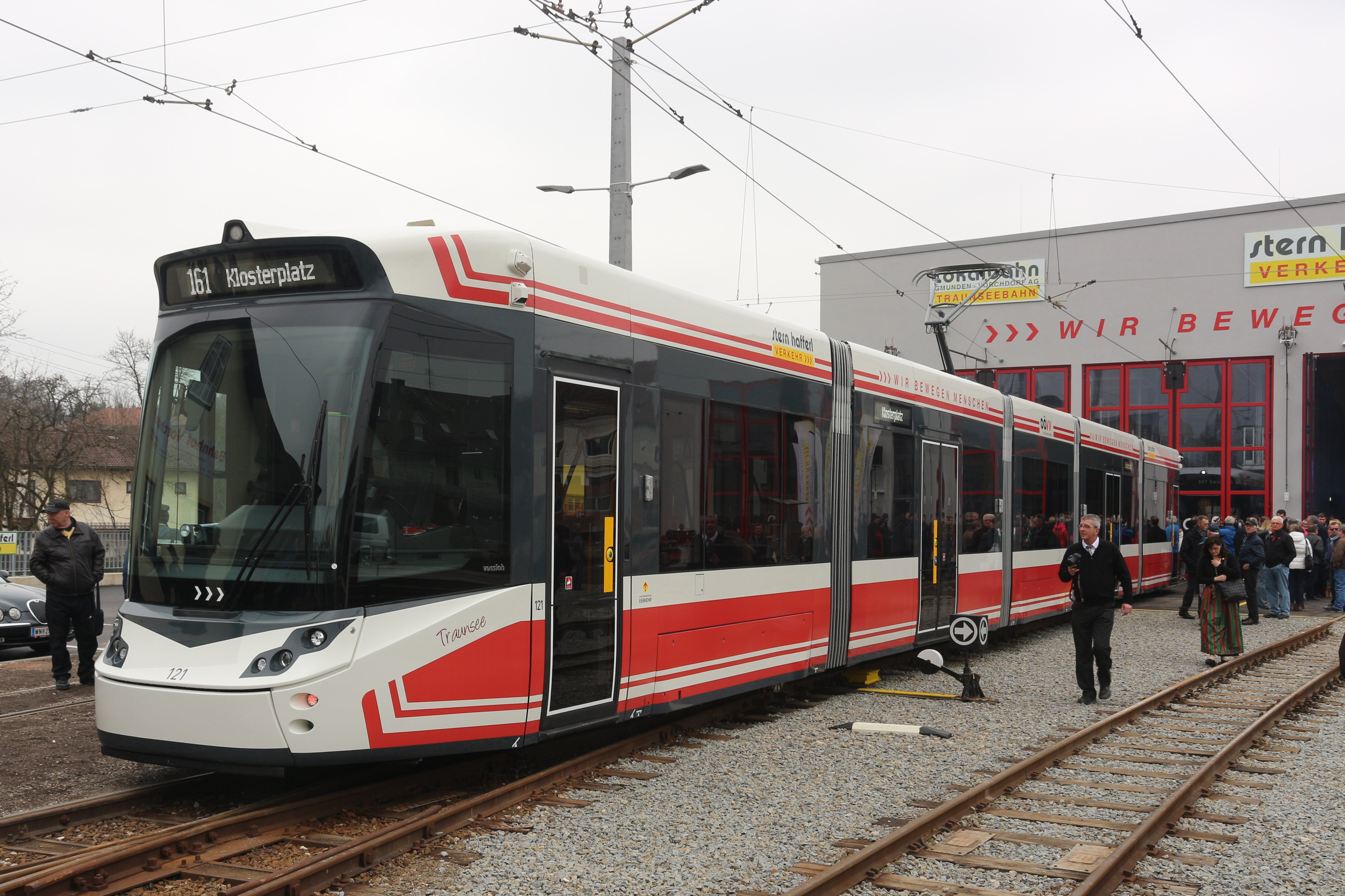
- Tramlink ET 121 of Stern & Hafferl in front of the depot in Vorchdorf-Eggenberg station
- Manufacturers: Vossloh; Stadler Rail since 2016
- Constructed: from 2007
- Number built: 317

Specifications
- Train length: 32.0–45.4 m (105.0–149.0 ft)
- Width: 2.3–2.65 m (7 ft 7 in – 8 ft 8 in)
- Height: 3.51–3.60 m (11.5–11.8 ft)
- Floor height: 290–320 mm (11–13 in)
- Low-floor: 100%
- Wheel diameter: 600 mm (24 in)
- Maximum speed: 80 km/h (50 mph)
- Power output: 100–105 kW (134–141 hp) per powered axle
- Electric system: 600 – 1500 V DC
- AAR wheel arrangement: see technical description
- Minimum turning radius: 17–25 m (56–82 ft)
- Track gauge: 1,000 mm (3 ft 3 3/8 in), 1,435 mm (4 ft 8 1/2 in)

Notes/references
- see also technical specifications

Tramlink is a family of three-, five- and seven- section low-floor trams, mostly of multi-articulated type, produced by Stadler Rail Valencia. The Tramlink was originally developed by Vossloh but has been manufactured by Stadler since they took over Vossloh's factory in Valencia in 2016.

== Operators ==
=== Prototypes and vehicles for León ===
Initially Vossloh built two prototype vehicles. These bi-directional vehicles had five sections and were 32 m long and 2.4 m wide. Testing took place from 2011 on the tram sections of Metrovalencia. Four identical vehicles were ordered for a tram project in León which was never built. The prototype vehicles are not known to have carried passengers, and their current location is unknown.

=== Rostock ===
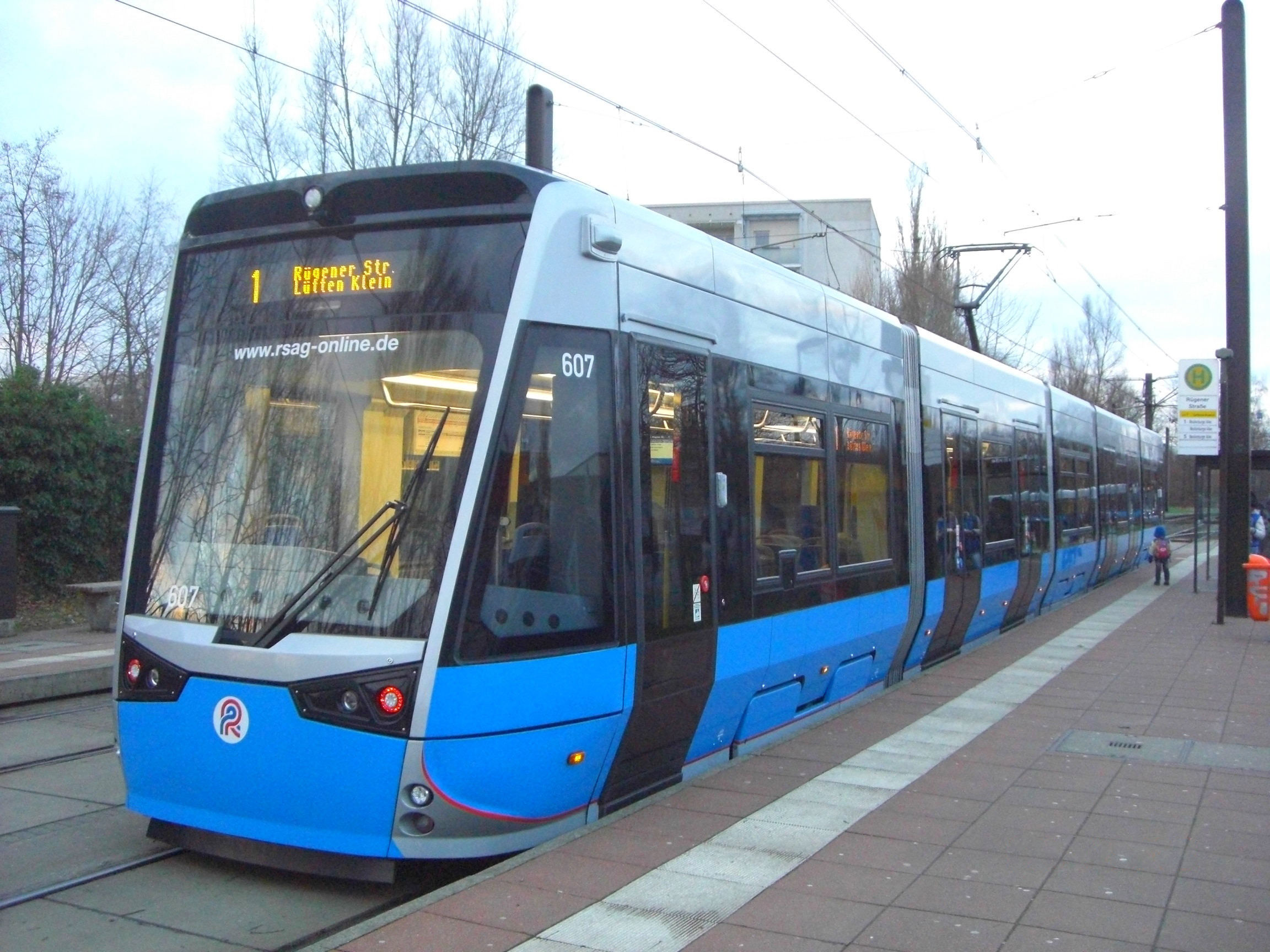
Tramlink 6N2 in Rostock

Between 2011 and 2014 the Rostock tramway received 13 uni-directional vehicles from Vossloh Kiepe, which from December 2014 began to replace Tatra T6A2 trams and 4BNWE trailers. The Rostock Tramlinks have two special features. The bottoms of the side walls slope inwards from 2.65 m wide to only 2.3 m to allow them to use the existing platforms. The vehicles are fitted with supercapacitors on the roof. These store up to 0.9 kWh of energy generated by regenerative braking, which can then be used for acceleration or heating and air conditioning, which is hoped to reduce the total energy consumption. The double doors in the suspended middle sections are each 1300 mm wide and the single doors in the end sections are 800 mm wide.

=== Stern & Hafferl ===
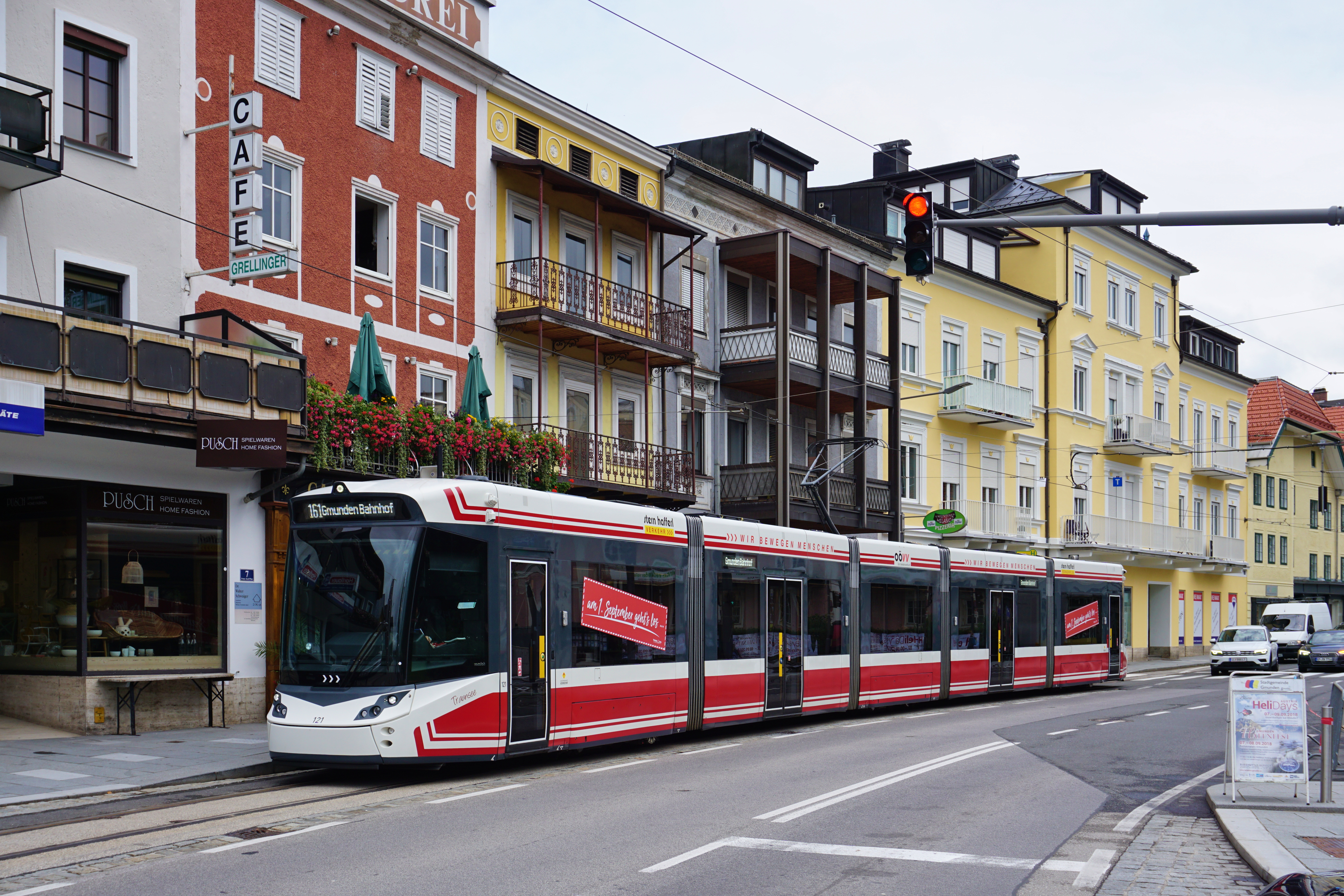
Tramlink V3 in Gmunden

After tests with a Combino from Nordhausen and a long-term loan of a Cityrunner from Innsbruck, Stern & Hafferl Verkehr ordered eleven bi-directional Tramlink V3 type trams from Vossloh Kiepe in 2014 for use on the Traunseebahn and the Atterseebahn. The vehicles were produced at Vossloh Kiepe's Spanish factory in Valencia. In order for the vehicles to be used on both the Traunseebahn and the Gmunden Tramway they are approved under railway and tramway regulations. Delivery was begun in 2015. The trams began operating on the Traunseebahn in March 2016. On 1 September 2018 the Traunseebahn and the Gmunden Tramway were connected and the Tramlink vehicles operate over both.

=== Baixada Santista ===
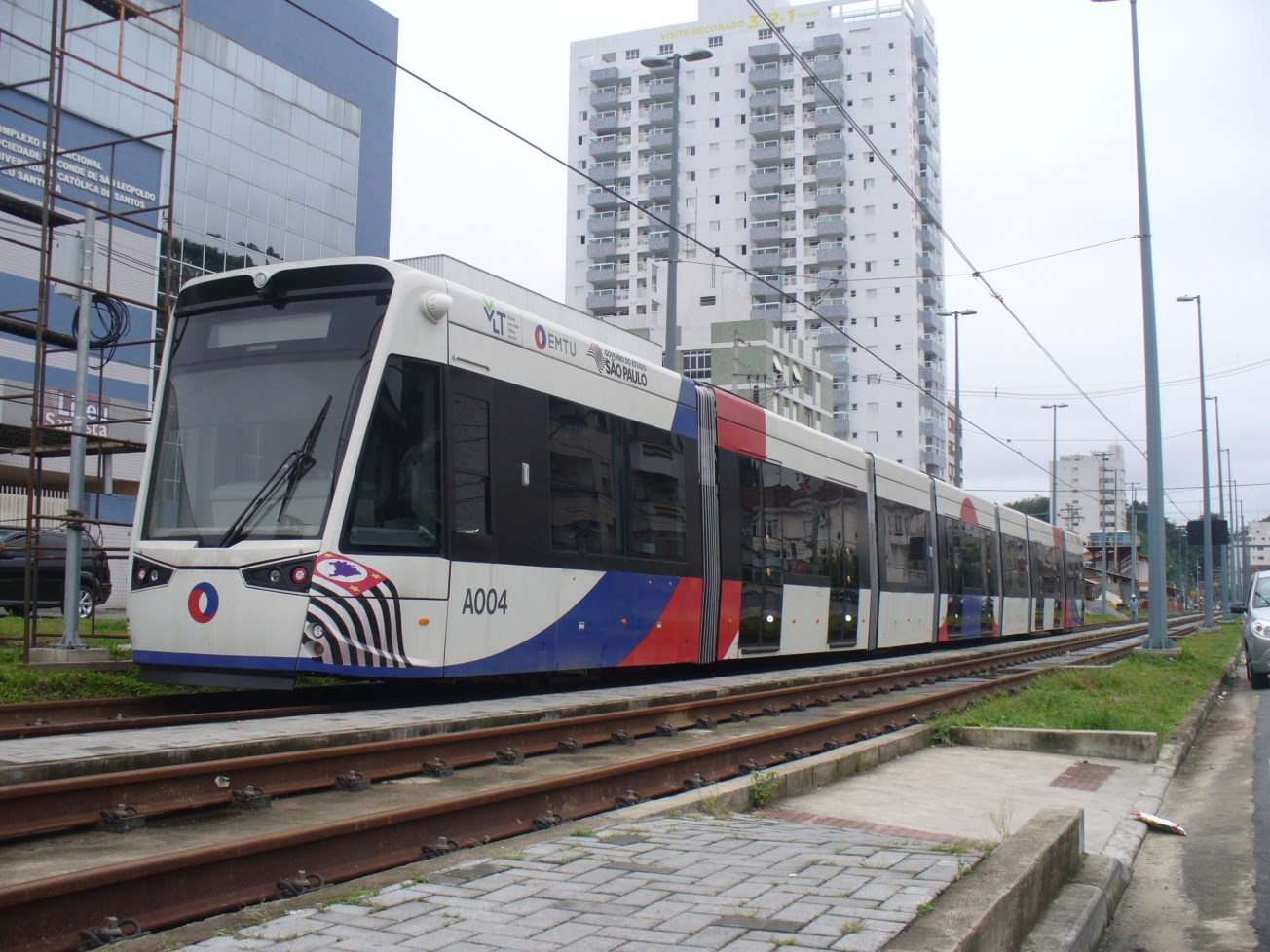
Tramlink V4 in Santos (Baixada Santista Light Rail)

Tramlink vehicles have been in operation since 2015 on the Baixada Santista Light Rail in Brazil. The bi-directional vehicles were ordered at the end of 2012 and are fitted with batteries for use on the catenary-free section of track in the centre of Santos.

=== Lugano–Ponte Tresa ===
In summer 2018 the Ferrovie Luganesi ordered nine Tramlink vehicles for approximately 50 million Swiss francs. The contract included an option for a further three vehicles. The seven-section vehicles were built at Stadler's factory in Valencia and replaced the Be 4/8 and Be 4/12 Mandarinli trains from 1978/79 on the Lugano–Ponte Tresa Railway The first vehicle was delivered on 11 March 2021, the last a year later.

=== Erfurt ===
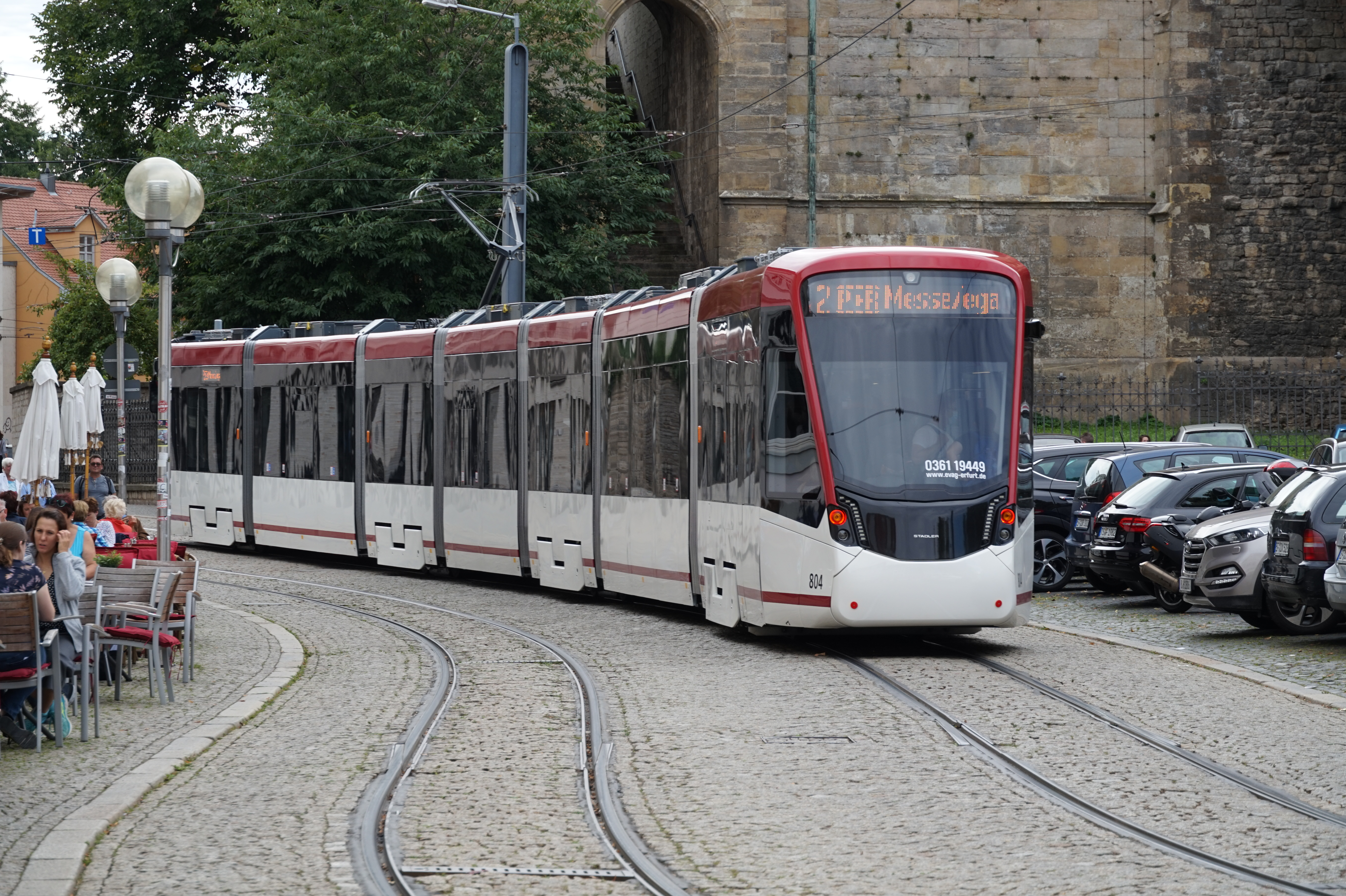
Tramlink in the centre of Erfurt

In 2018 Erfurter Verkehrsbetriebe ordered 14 Tramlink vehicles for the Erfurt tramway system. The uni-directional vehicles are 42 m long and can carry 248 passengers. They have been in service since 2021 and the total cost was around 56 million euros. As well as in Valencia some of the production also took place at Stadler's factory in Pankow, Berlin. In May 2023 an option in the original contract was used to order ten more trams.

=== Waldenburgerbahn und Limmattalbahn ===
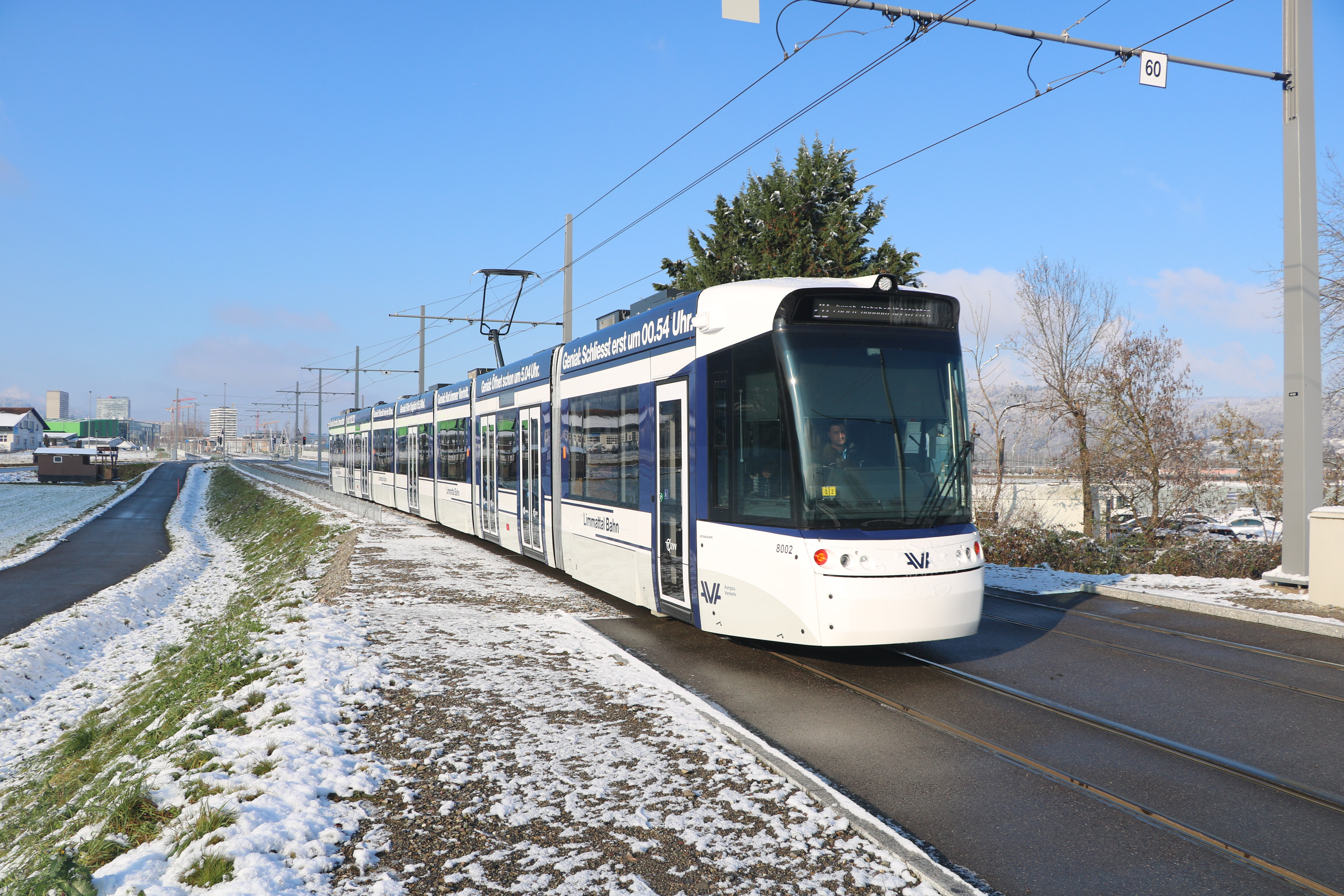
Tramlink on the Limmattalbahn

In autumn 2018 Baselland Transport (BLT) and Aargau Verkehr (AVA) announced a joint order for 18 seven-section Tramlinks, worth 103 million Swiss francs. The trams with a maximum speed of 80 km/h have been in service since the end of 2022 on the Waldenburgerbahn and the newly built Limmattalbahn. The Waldenburgerbahn, formerly the only 750 mm-gauge railway in Switzerland, was being rebuilt and re-gauged to metre gauge. The joint order allowed considerable savings on the cost of the vehicles and their maintenance. On the Waldenburgerbahn the approximately 45 m long trains are intended to be used in coupled pairs at peak times. The Limmattalbahn vehicles are fitted with a ZSI-127 train protection system. Although this is not used on the Limmattalbahn itself, it is needed for the vehicles to use part of the Wohlen–Dietikon railway line in Dietikon and to access the AVA workshops in Bremgarten.

=== Milan ===
In July 2019 Stadler won a tender from Azienda Trasporti Milanesi to deliver up to 80 bi-directional vehicles for the Milan tram network. The first order comprised 30 vehicles, 20 for the city network and 10 for interurban lines. Unlike all other Tramlink vehicles these are not multi-articulated vehicles, but have a suspended articulation. The short centre module of the three-section trams runs on a fixed (non-rotating) trailer bogie and the two longer end modules each have a motor bogie at the outer end. The bogies were adopted from the Metelitsa tram built by Stadler Minsk. The trams are 25 m long with three doors on each side. The first vehicle was delivered to Milan in December 2022 and entered service in February 2025. In June 2023 Stadler won a second tender for up to 50 further vehicles, of which 25 will be 35 m long with four doors per side. Initially fourteen 35 m long trams were ordered, with delivery expected from June 2026. A further 30 trams were also ordered from the first contract.

=== Bern ===
Bernmobil ordered an initial batch of 27 vehicles (twenty uni-directional and seven bi-directional) in September 2019, and a contract for up to 50 trams in December 2019 was signed in December 2019. The first tram was delivered on 1 February 2023. In February 2024 the delivery of new vehicles was interrupted due to faults in the nine trams already delivered.

=== Augsburg ===
In October 2019 Stadler and the Stadtwerke Augsburg announced an order for 11 trams for the Augsburg tram network. At the end of 2020 the order was increased to 15 trams. The seven-section uni-directional vehicles are 42 m long, 100% low-floor and can carry up to 231 passengers, 86 of which seated.

=== Jena ===
In August 2020 Stadtwerke Jena-Pößneck announced an order for 24 trams, with an option for 19 more, for the Jena tram network. The operator named them as Lichtbahn. Delivery of the 16 seven-section and 8 five-section vehicles began in May 2023 and the first tram entered service in December 2023. The entirely low-floor trams are 41.88 m or 32.55 m long with capacity for 241 or 180 passengers respectively, including 80 or 58 seats. Unlike the GT6M and Tramino already in use in Jena the Tramlink are wider, with an unusual width of 2.45 m. The seating arrangements in the wheeled modules are varied, sometimes with two seats either side of the aisle and sometimes with two seats on one side and an unusually wide single seat the other side, or with single seats on both sides. Also noteworthy is that none of the double doors are opposite each other.

The manufacturer will also maintain the trams for 24 years, with an optional extension of 8 years.

=== Potsdam ===
In December 2021 Stadler and ViP, operator of the Potsdam tram network, announced an order of ten Tramlink vehicles. The contract includes an option for a further 15 trams, three of which had been ordered as of 2025. The fully low-floor vehicles are 42 m long, have eight doors and a capacity of 246 passengers, including 74 seats. The first tram was unveiled in Potsdam in March 2025 and entered passenger service on 18 December 2025.

=== Geneva ===
In 2022 Transports publics genevois (TPG) ordered 38 Tramlink trams for the Geneva tram network. They will be delivered from the end of 2024 to replace the first generation of low-floor trams and for use on new routes. The bi-directional trams will be 44 m long and 2.3 m wide. TPG has an option to order up to 25 more Tramlinks.

=== Lausanne ===
In autumn 2022 Transports publics de la région lausannoise announced an order for 10 Tramlink trams. They will be used on the new tram line from Lausanne to Renens. The vehicles will be 2.65 m wide and 45 m long. They will be the only standard-gauge Tramlink in Switzerland.

=== Valencia and Alicante ===
On 2 March 2023 the Ferrocarrils de la Generalitat Valenciana (FGV) and Stadler announced an order for 16 seven-section Tramlink vehicles, with two options each for six additional vehicles. The metre-gauge trams will be used on Metrovalencia and the Alicante Tram and be numbered as series 4500. They will be 45 m long and 2.4 m wide.

=== Gotha ===
The Gotha tramway and Thüringerwaldbahn ordered four bi-directional Tramlinks in 2025, with options for another six vehicles. The vehicles will be 32 m long and 2.45 m wide and are planned to be delivered in 2027 and enter service in 2028.

=== Camp de Tarragona ===
In July 2025, Stadler was announced as the preferred bidder to supply seven Tramlink vehicles to FGC for the TramCamp project in Camp de Tarragona, Spain. The bi-directional vehicles will have five sections and be 33.6 m long and 2.65 m wide. They will be fitted with lithium-titanate batteries to allow operation for up to 9.9 km away from overhead lines.

== Technical description ==
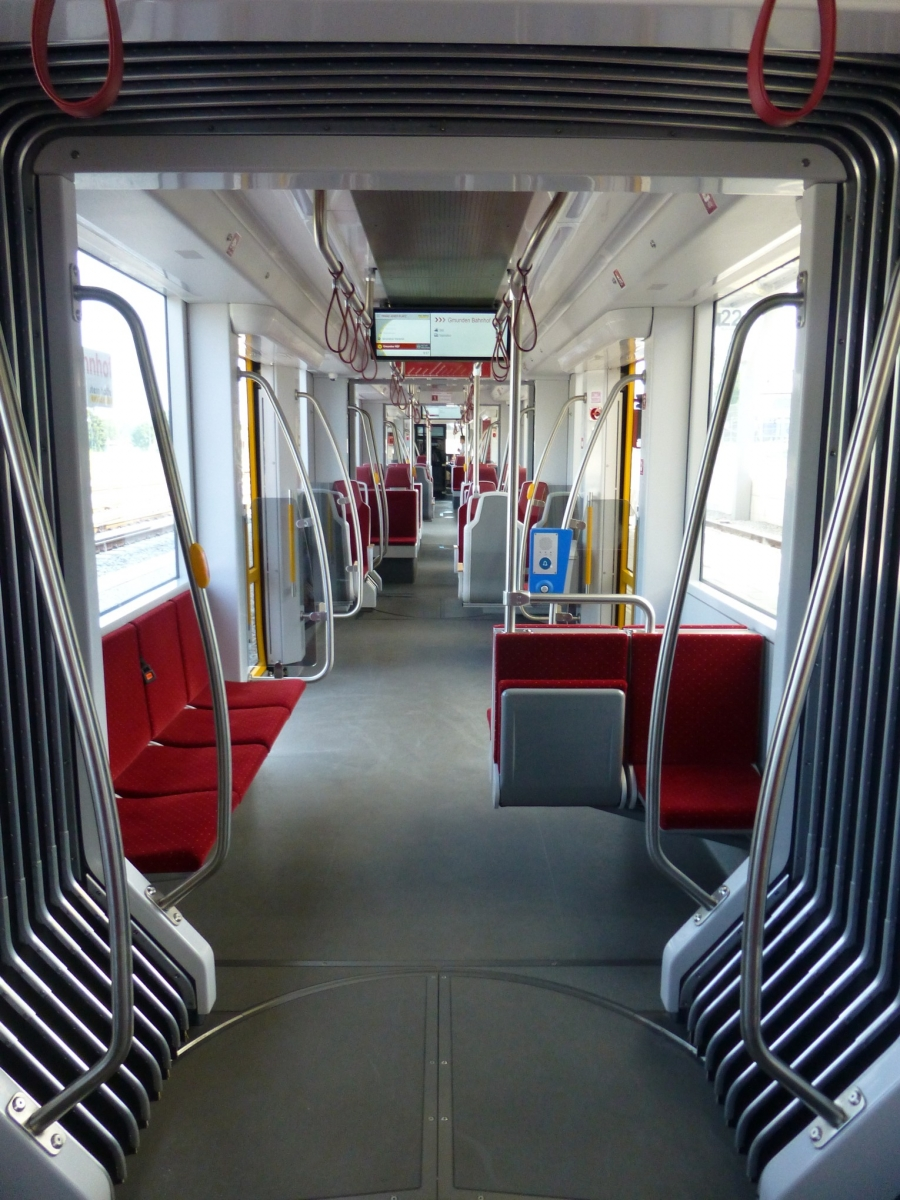
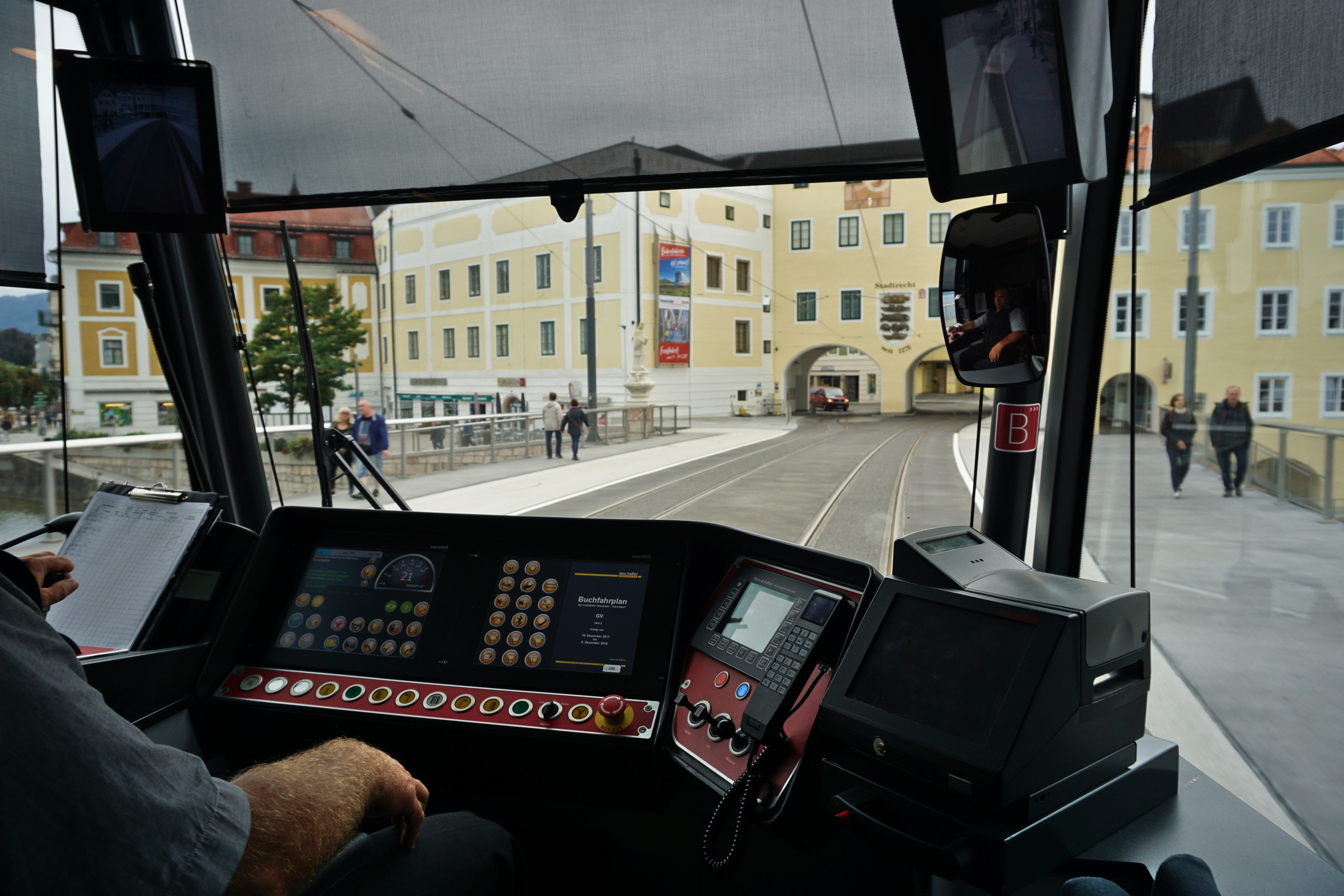
Interior and cab of a Tramlink in Gmunden

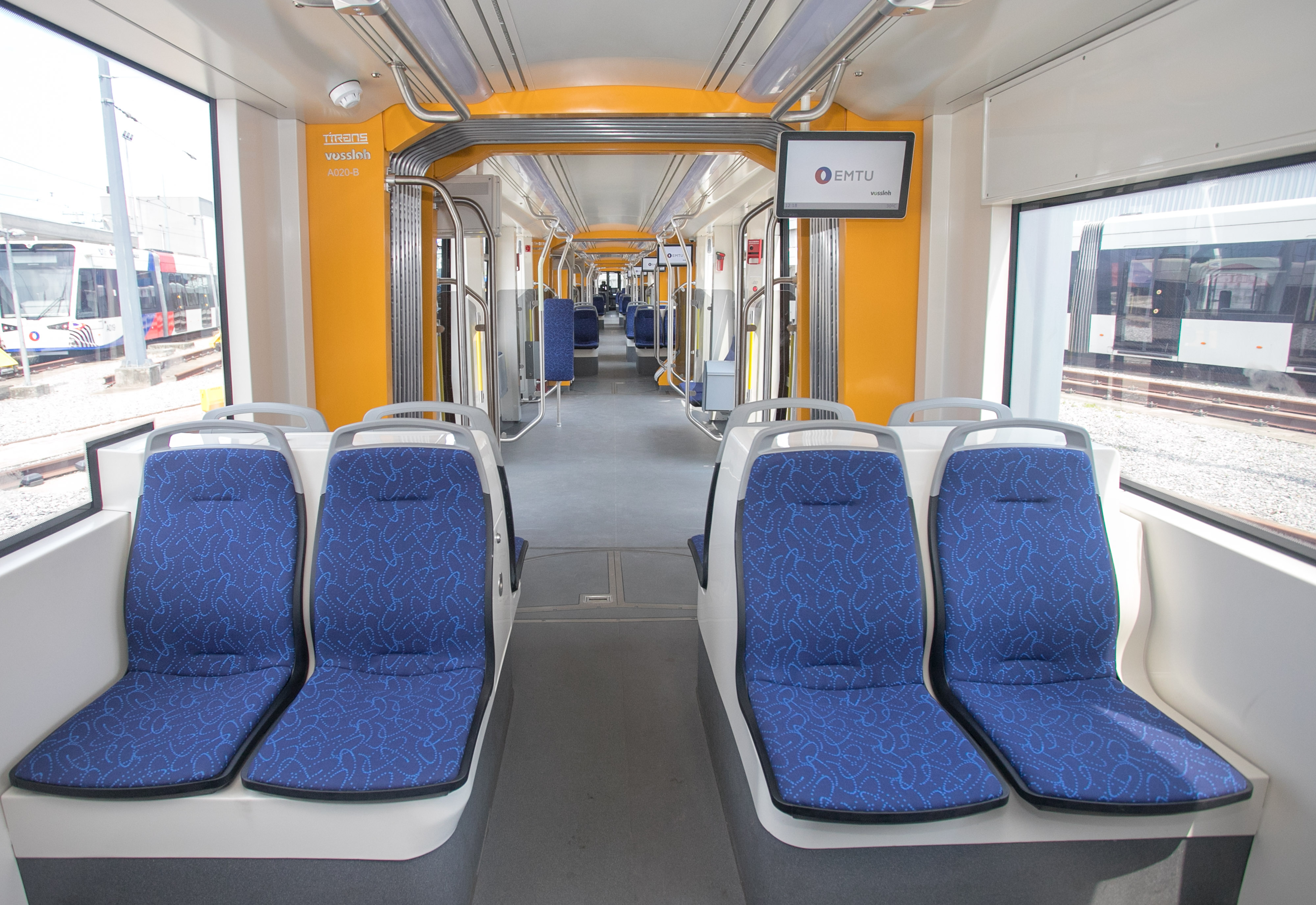
Interior of a Tramlink in Santos. Under the eight seats is a wheelset with a conventional axle.

Tramlink vehicles can be produced as uni-directional or bi-directional vehicles with different body widths and for standard gauge, metre gauge or 900 mm gauge.

=== Mechanical part ===
The five or seven-section multi-articulated vehicles consist of two powered end modules and one or two wheeled intermediate modules, connected by suspended modules with no wheels. The powered chassis of the end modules and the unpowered chassis in the wheeled intermediate modules all have conventional wheelsets connected by axles. On some of the seven-section variants one of the intermediate modules also has a powered chassis. The chassis have two-stage (rubber roll and coil spring) suspension, rubber-sprung wheel tyres and a relatively large wheel diameter, which all contribute to good running characteristics. Despite the conventional axles the vehicles are still 100% low-floor without steps. The two motors for each chassis unit are each fitted under a group of seats. This requires two seats each side of the aisle over the chassis, with a total of 16 seats over every chassis unit. The tram body shells are built from stainless steel and fulfil the EN 15227 crash-worthiness standard.

=== Drive and brakes ===
The power converter and auxiliary power converter are supplied from the overhead line, with chokes and capacitors to smooth the input voltage. Each motor bogie has its own power converter supplying two asynchronous motors with water-cooled stators. In regenerative braking the power converter can feed direct current back into the overhead line and during braking other electrical components in the vehicle can also be supplied from the braking energy. If the braking energy can not be fed back to the overhead line the electric brake can also operate as a rheostatic brake. The traction control reacts automatically to wheelslip and sliding of the powered wheels. The majority of the electrical equipment, including the externally-ventilated braking resistors and the air conditioning units, is located on the roof. In addition to the electrical braking the vehicles have a hydraulic spring-applied brake, which serves as the parking brake. For emergency use every bogie has a magnetic track brake.

== Overview of variants ==
Vossloh Tramlink					Stadler Tramlink				
Operator	Prototypes und vehicles for cancelled project in León	Rostocker Straßenbahn	Stern & Hafferl		EMTU	Ferrovie Luganesi	Erfurter Verkehrsbetriebe	Baselland Transport	Aargau Verkehr
City	Prototypes und vehicles for cancelled project in León	Rostock	Gmunden		Santos / São Vicente	Lugano	Erfurt		
Network	Prototypes und vehicles for cancelled project in León	Trams in Rostock	Traunseebahn	Atterseebahn	Baixada Santista Light Rail	Lugano–Ponte Tresa Railway	Trams in Erfurt	Waldenburgerbahn	Limmattalbahn
Class name	Prototypes und vehicles for cancelled project in León	Tramlink 6N2	Tramlink V3		Tramlink V4	Be 6/8	Tramlink V4	Be 6/8	
Numbering		601–613	121–123, 127–131	124–126		51–59	801–814	101–110	8001–8008
Quantity	2+4	13	8	3	22	9	14+10	10	8
Manufactured at	Valencia-Albuixech								
Year built		2014	2016–2017		2015	2020	2021	2022–2023	2022
Wheel arrangement	Bo’2’Bo’	Bo’2’Bo’	Bo’2’Bo’		Bo’2’2’Bo’	Bo’2’Bo’Bo’	Bo’2’Bo’Bo’	Bo’2’Bo’Bo’	
Modules	5	5	5		7	7	7	7	
Track gauge	1000 mm	1435 mm	1000 mm		1435 mm	1000 mm	1000 mm	1000 mm	
Uni-/bi-directional	⇄	→	⇄		⇄	⇄	→	⇄	
Length	32.000 m	32.000 m	32.000 m		43.700 m	45.420 m	42.49 m	45 m	
Width	2400 mm	2650 mm	2400 mm		2650 mm	2400 mm	2300 mm	2400 mm	
Height	3450 mm	3510 mm	3600 mm		3560 mm	3560 mm	3610 mm	3610mm	
Minimum radius	18 m	18 m	17 m		25 m	20 m	16 m		
Weight	40.8 t	43.9 t	41.3 t				52.53 t		
Maximum speed		70 km/h	70 km/h		70 km/h	80 km/h	70 km/h (limited to 63 km/h)	80 km/h	
Power (continuous)	4 × 105 kW	4 × 100 kW	4 × 100 kW		4 × 105 kW	6 × 100 kW	6 × 100 kW		
Wheel diameter (new)	600 mm	600 mm	600 mm		600 mm	600 mm			
Electrification system		600/750 V DC	600/750 V DC		750 V DC	1200 V DC	750 V DC	1500 V DC	600/1200 V DC
Seats	42	71	60 + 15 folding seats		74	70	92	88	
Standing passengers (4 people/m^{2})	156	139	100		272	228	156	172	
Entry height	315 mm	290 mm	290 mm		300 mm	320 mm	300 mm		
Number of double doors Single doors	4 per side 2 per side	4; 2	2 per side 2 per side		6 per side 1 per side	8 per side	5; 2		
Notes:	Never entered service	Fitted with supercapacitors	Approved according to tramway and railway regulations		Fitted with batteries			Stadler CBTC	ZSI-127 train protection system
References									

Stadler Tramlink
Operator	Azienda Trasporti Milanesi		Bernmobil		Augsburger Verkehrsgesellschaft	Stadtwerke Energie Jena-Pößneck		Verkehrsbetrieb Potsdam	Transports publics genevois
City	Milan		Bern		Augsburg	Jena		Potsdam	Geneva
Network	Trams in Milan		Trams in Bern		Trams in Augsburg	Trams in Jena		Trams in Potsdam	Trams in Geneva
Class name			Be 6/8			Lichtbahn			
Numbering	7701–		901–907, 911–930		901–915	801–816	851–858	441–450 (451–465)	
Quantity	60	14	20	7	11+4	16	8	10	38
Quantity	(+ option for 45)	(+ option for 11)	(+ option for 23)		(+ option for 12)	(+ option for 19)		(+ option for 15)	(+ option for 25)
Manufactured at	Valencia-Albuixech								
Year built	2022–	2026–	2023–		2022–	2023–		2023–	2024–
Wheel arrangement			Bo’Bo’2’Bo’						
Modules	3	5	7		7	7	5	7	7
Track gauge	1445 mm		1000 mm		1000 mm	1000 mm		1435 mm	1000 mm
Uni-/bi-directional	⇄		⇄	→	→	⇄		→	⇄
Length	25.4 m	35 m	42.500 m		42 m	41.9 m	32.6 m	42 m	44 m
Width	2400 mm		2300 mm		2300 mm	2450 mm		2300 mm	2300 mm
Height	3685 mm		3560 mm			3560 mm			
Minimum radius	17 m		16.5 m			20 m		19.5 m	
Weight					52.3 t				
Maximum speed	60 km/h		70 km/h		70 km/h	70 km/h			
Power (continuous)	4 × 105 kW		6 × 105 kW		6 × 100 kW	6 × 105 kW	4 × 105 kW	6 × 100 kW	
Wheel diameter (new):	610 mm		600 mm			610 mm			
Electrification system	600 V DC		600/750 V DC		750 V DC	750 V DC		750 V DC	600 V DC
Seats			52	68	86	80	58	74	
Standing passengers (4 people/m^{2})			208	192	145	161	122	172	
Entry height	350 mm		320 mm			300 mm		300 mm	
Number of double doors Single doors	3 per side 0	4 per side 0	6 per side 1 per side	4; 2	5; 2	4 2	3 2	6; 2	
Notes	Three-section version without suspended modules	Five-section version							
References									

Stadler Tramlink
Operator	Transports publics de la région lausannoise	Ferrocarrils de la Generalitat Valenciana	Thüringer Waldbahn und Straßenbahn Gotha	Ferrocarrils de la Generalitat de Catalunya
City	Lausanne	Valencia, Alicante	Gotha	Camp de Tarragona
Network	Lausanne Tramway	Metrovalencia, Alicante Tram	Trams in Gotha	TramCamp
Class name		4500		
Numbering				
Quantity	10	16	4	7
Quantity	10	(+ option for 12)	(+ option for 6)	7
Manufactured at	Valencia-Albuixech			
Year built				
Wheel arrangement				
Modules	7	7	5	5
Track gauge	1435 mm	1000 mm	1000 mm	1435 mm
Uni-/bi-directional	⇄	⇄	⇄	⇄
Length	45 m	45 m	32 m	33.6 m
Width	2650 mm	2400 mm	2450 mm	2650 mm
Height				
Minimum radius				
Weight				
Maximum speed				81 km/h
Power (continuous)				
Wheel diameter (new):				
Electrification system				750 V DC
Seats				
Standing passengers (4 people/m^{2})				
Entry height				
Number of double doors Single doors	8 per side 0	8 per side 0	3 per side 2 per side	6 per side 0
Notes				Lithium-titanate batteries
References				
