= Uni-directional =

Unidirectional may refer to:

- simplex communication, in communications theory
- Half-duplex signaling behavior, using ITU standards
- Uni-directional vehicle, a railcar with controls at one end only
