= Trams in Nordhausen =

Tram system in Nordhausen, Germany

Coordinates: 51°30′N 10°47′E

Nordhausen tramway
- Straßenbahn Nordhausen
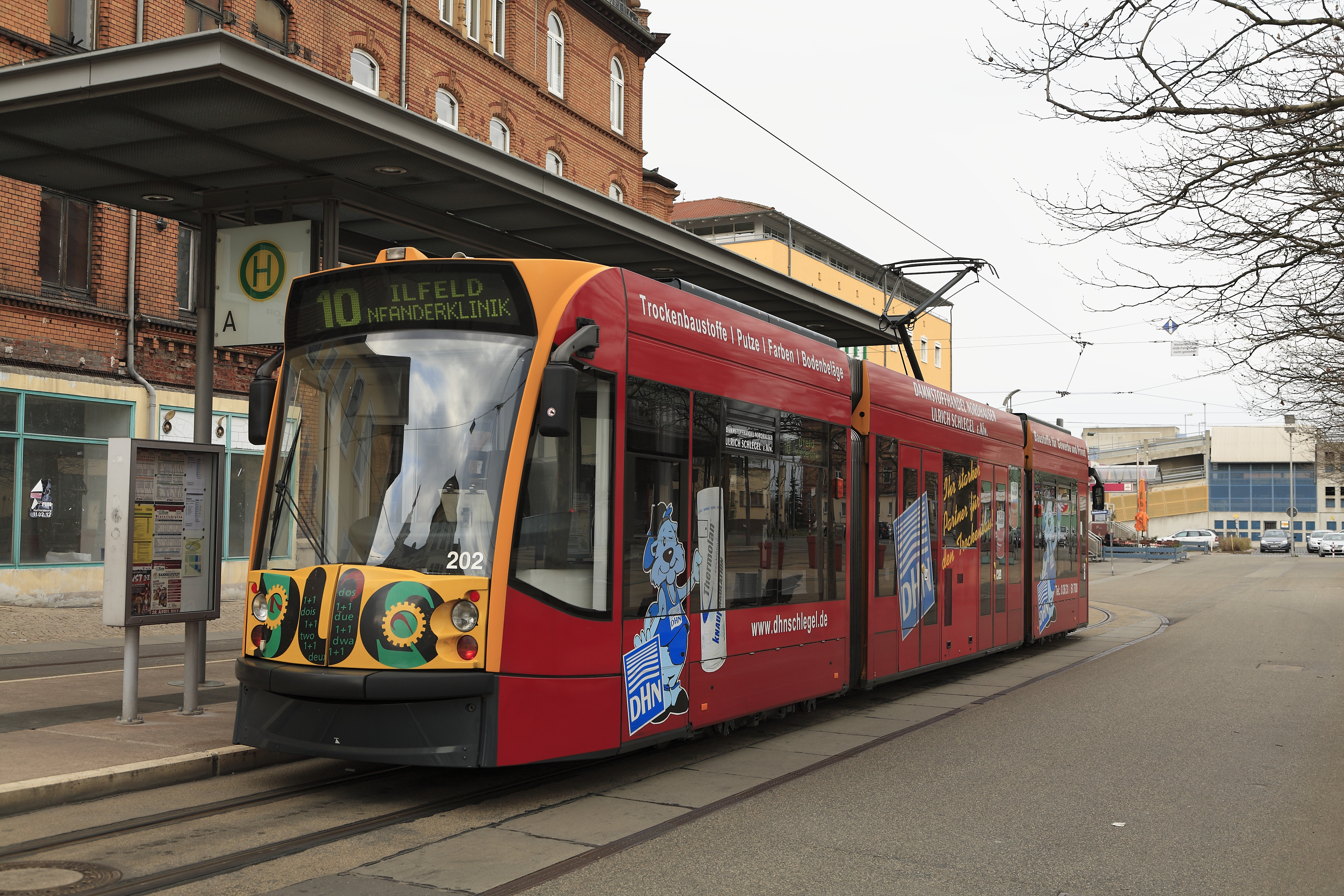
- Combino Duo tram at Nordhausen Bahnhofsplatz

Operation
- Locale: Nordhausen, Thuringia, Germany
- Open: 25 August 1900
- Status: Operational
- Lines: 3
- Operator: Verkehrsbetriebe Nordhausen

Infrastructure
- Track gauge: 1,000 mm (3 ft 3 3/8 in) metre gauge
- Propulsion system: Electricity
- Electrification: 600 V DC
- Stock: 9 Combino; 3 Combino Duo

Statistics
- Route length: 6.6 km (4.1 mi)
Overview
Network map
- Website: https://www.stadtwerke-nordhausen.de/ Stadtwerke Nordhausen (in German)

The Nordhausen tramway (German: Straßenbahn Nordhausen) is a network of tramways forming part of the public transport system in Nordhausen, a city in Thuringia, Germany.

Opened in 1900, the network is currently operated by Verkehrsbetriebe Nordhausen and has three lines, including one linking Nordhausen with nearby Ilfeld which runs as a tram-train on tracks belonging to the Harz Narrow Gauge Railways.

== Tram-train ==
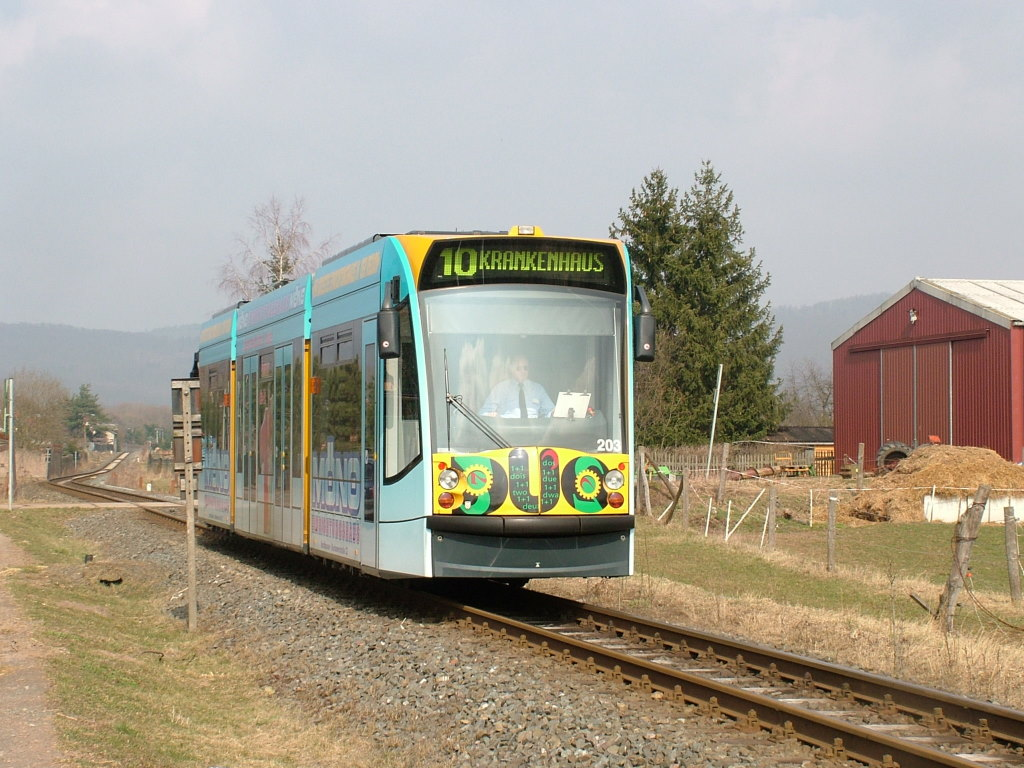
Combino Duo on the Harzquerbahn

Nordhausen also practices a unique model of tram-train operation, in which metre-gauge dual-power railcars operate using electric power in the town, and change to diesel-electric to operate on the Harzer Schmalspurbahnen (HSB) line to Ilfeld.

On the centenary of the Harzquerbahn in 1999, HSB and Stadtwerke Nordhausen stated their intent to connect the railway and tram systems. A track along Oskar-Cohn-Straße connecting the Bahnhofsplatz tram stop to the Harzquerbahn sidings at Nordhausen Nord station opened on 28 April 2002, and since then HSB railcars have terminated at the tram stop instead of the railway station.

Since the HSB is not electrified, new dual-power vehicles had to be procured. On 25 August 2000, as part of the centenary celebrations of the Nordhausen tramway, the first such vehicle was presented. GT4 tram No. 72 was fitted with two five-cylinder passenger car diesel engines, named the Twino and used for practical testing of dual-power operation. In December 2001 three Combino Duo trams were ordered, fitted with 190-kW BMW M67 3.9-litre V8 engines.

On 1 May 2004, route 10 was launched. It follows the course of route 1 from the Südharz Klinikum hospital through Nordhausen town centre to the station forecourt, and then along the Harzquerbahn track as far as Ilfeld Neanderklinik, a distance of 11.4 km.

In 2024 a study into the future of the tram-train line suggested electrification of the railway line and operation with standard trams would be a better option than new hybrid vehicles powered by batteries or hydrogen when the Combino Duos need replacing.

== Lines ==
In 1990 the network had two lines. Line 1 linked Bahnhofsplatz, outside Nordhausen railway station, to the hospital in the north of the town and line 2 ran from Parkallee to Arnoldstraße, where it met line 1. A 1.8 km (1.1 mi) long extension from Theaterplatz to the new housing development in Nordhausen-Ost was opened on 3 October 1993, and is operated as an extension of line 2.

Since the opening of the tram-train line 10 in 2004, Nordhausen has had the following three tram lines:

Line	Route	Length	Headway
1	Krankenhaus – Rathaus/Kornmarkt – Bahnhofsplatz	3.2 km (2.0 mi)	Mon–Fri: 15 min Sat–Sun, holidays: 30 min
2	Parkallee – Landratsamt – Rathaus/Kornmarkt – Nordhausen Ost	4.6 km (2.9 mi)	Mon–Fri: 15 min Sat–Sun, holidays: 30 min
10	Krankenhaus – Rathaus/Kornmarkt – Bahnhofsplatz – Niedersachswerfen Ost – Ilfeld Neanderklinik	14.6 km (9.1 mi)	Mon–Fri: 60 min Sat–Sun, holidays: 120 min

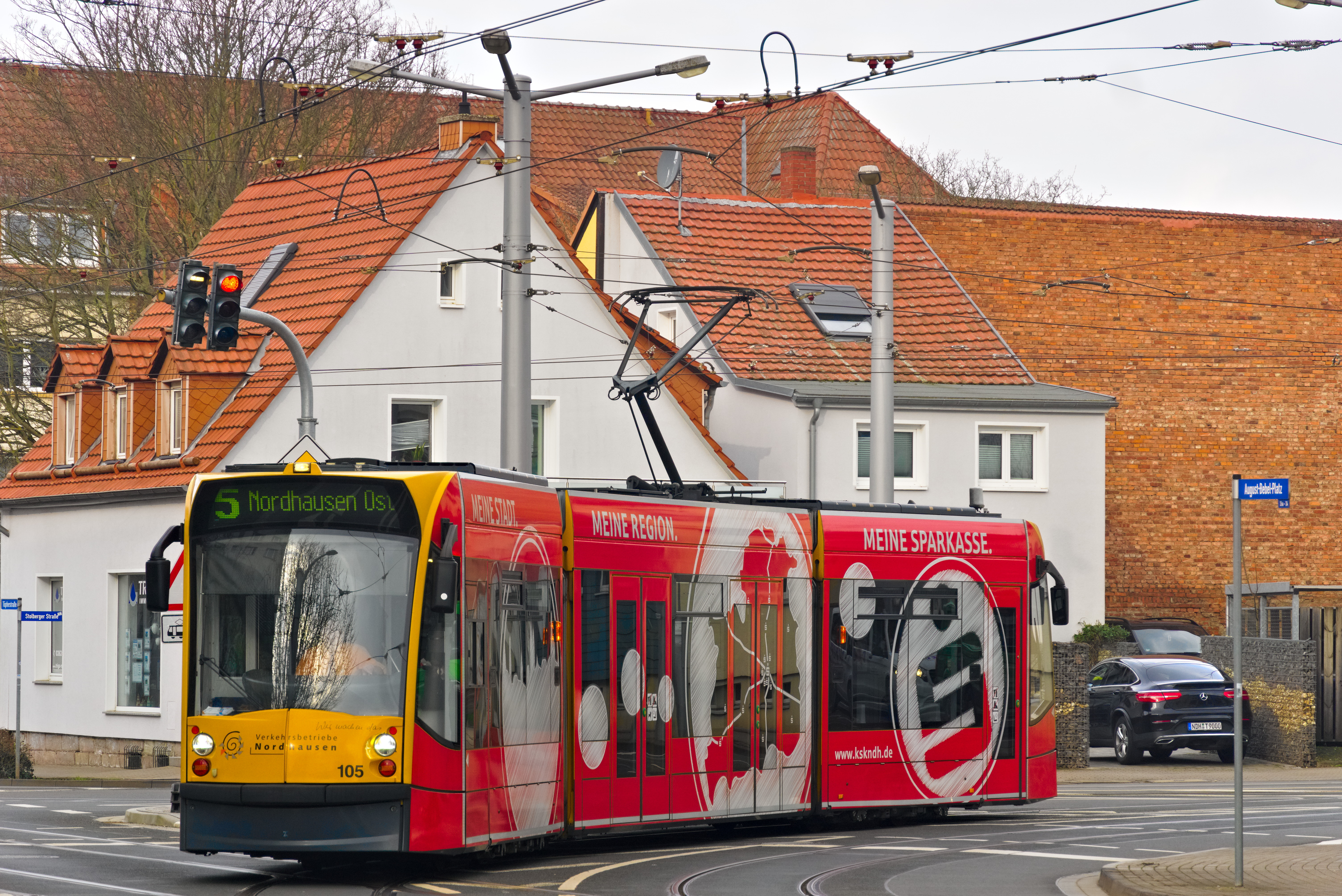
Tram 105 on line 5 using the track connection from Stolberger Straße to August-Bebel-Platz. This connection is not used in normal service.

If sections of the network are blocked there are four replacement lines with fixed numbers and routes. These are:

Line	Route
3	Krankenhaus – Rathaus/Kornmarkt – Nordbrand – Grimmel – Parkallee
4	Nordhausen Ost – Rathaus/Kornmarkt – Nordbrand – Bahnhofsplatz
5	Krankenhaus – Nordhausen Ost
6	Parkallee – Grimmel – Bahnhofsplatz

When it is not possible to use their normal route on the tram network, trams on line 10 switch to and from lines 4 or 6 at Bahnhofsplatz.

== Rolling stock ==
=== Current fleet (Combino) ===
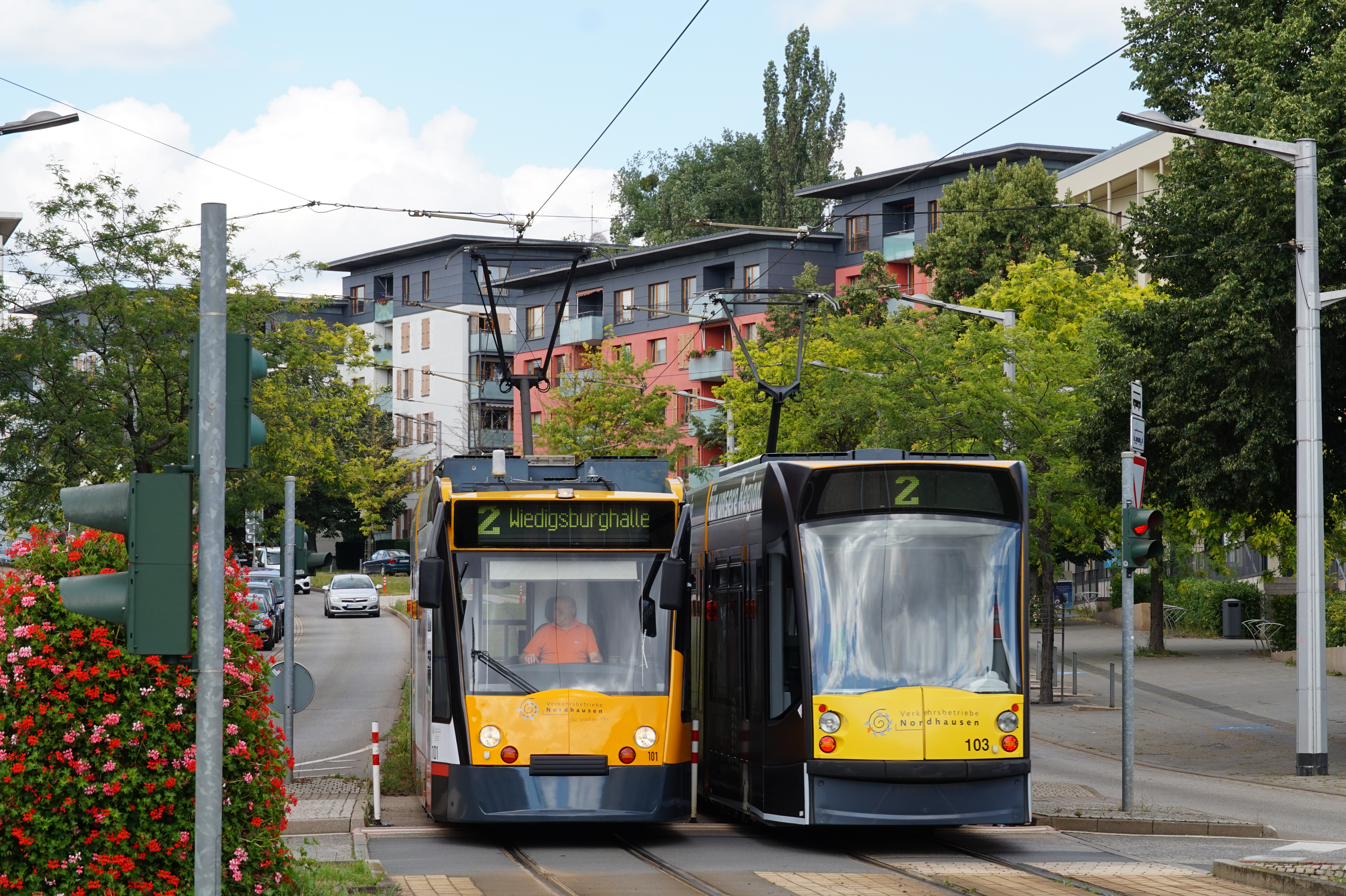
Combino Basic (left) and Combino Advanced (right) trams passing on Rautenstraße

The current fleet consists entirely of Siemens Combino trams manufactured between 2000 and 2011. All are three-section vehicles (the first three-section Combino trams) and are 2.3 metres (7 ft 7 in) wide and roughly 20 metres (65 ft 7 in) long. The different models (Basic, Advanced and Classic) have different designs of cab end and there is a mixture of uni-directional and bi-directional vehicles. Due to the maximum gradient of 9.3 % on the tram network all wheels are powered. The Combino Duo trams are fitted with a diesel engine to allow operation on the unelectrified section of tram-train line 10 on the Harzquerbahn.

Numbers	Type	Uni-/bi-directional	Year built
101, 102	Basic	uni-directional	2000
103, 104	Advanced	uni-directional	2002
105–107	Advanced	bi-directional	2002
108, 109	Classic	uni-directional	2011
201–203	Combino Duo	bi-directional	2004

=== Former vehicles ===
==== GT4 ====
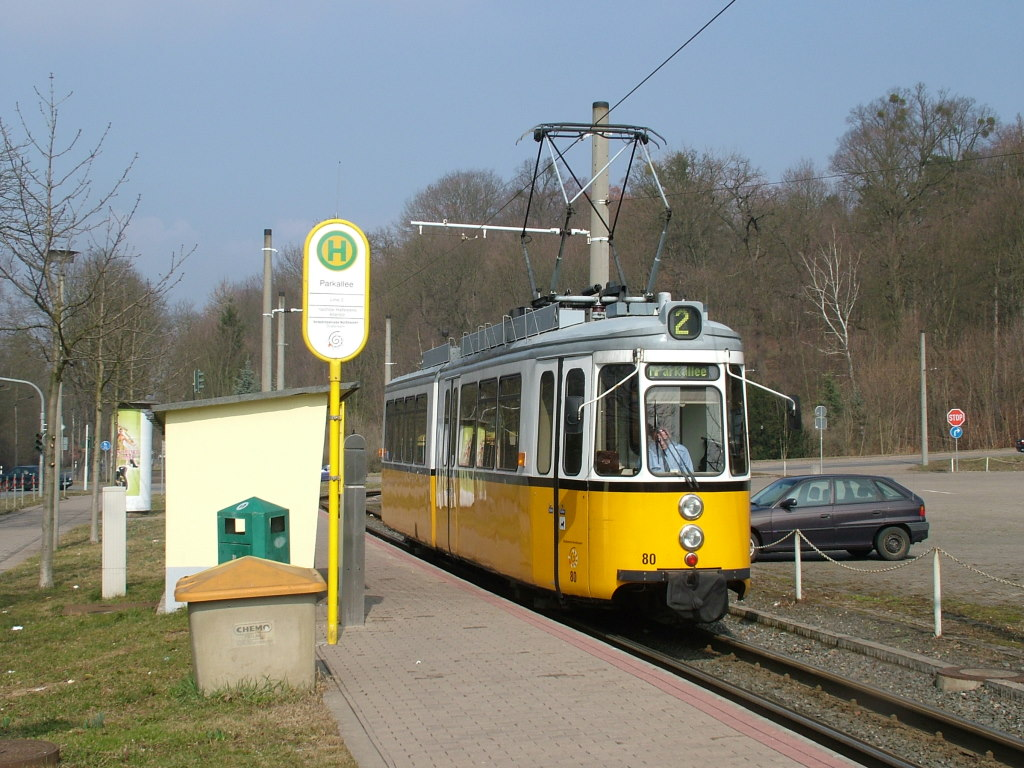
Modernised GT4 tram from Stuttgart

After German reunification type GT4 trams were bought second-hand from Stuttgart and Freiburg im Breisgau, the last of which remained in service until 28 January 2012.

At first twelve uni-directional vehicles were acquired from Stuttgart and numbered 71–82, along with a further four vehicles to use as spare parts. The first GT4 entered service on 1 August 1991. From 1995–1998 trams 78–81 were modernised by Mittenwalder Gerätebau. Tram 72 was painted turquoise instead of yellow and fitted with diesel engines as a trial vehicle for the tram-train operations on the Harzquerbahn. The unmodernised trams were withdrawn between 1998 and 2006 and tram 78 was scrapped in 2010. In 2012 the last three vehicles (79–81) were given to the tram network in Iași, Romania.

In 1994 the GT4 fleet was expanded with four bi-directional vehicles from Freiburg, numbered 91–94. Three more trams were also acquired for spare parts. Trams 91 and 92 were transferred to Halberstadt in 2003. Trams 93 and 94 were scrapped in 2008 and 2013.

== See also ==
- List of town tramway systems in Germany
- Trams in Germany

== Bibliography ==
- Bauer, Gerhard; Kuschinski, Norbert (1994). Die Straßenbahnen in Ostdeutschland [The Tramways in East Germany]. Vol. Band 2: Sachsen-Anhalt, Thüringen [Volume 2: Saxony-Anhalt, Thuringia]. Aachen, Germany: Schweers + Wall. ISBN 392167980X.
- Schwandl, Robert (2012). Schwandl's Tram Atlas Deutschland (in German and English) (3rd ed.). Berlin: Robert Schwandl Verlag. ISBN 9783936573336.
