= Baixada Santista Light Rail =

Light rail system in Brazil

Baixada Santista Light Rail Transit

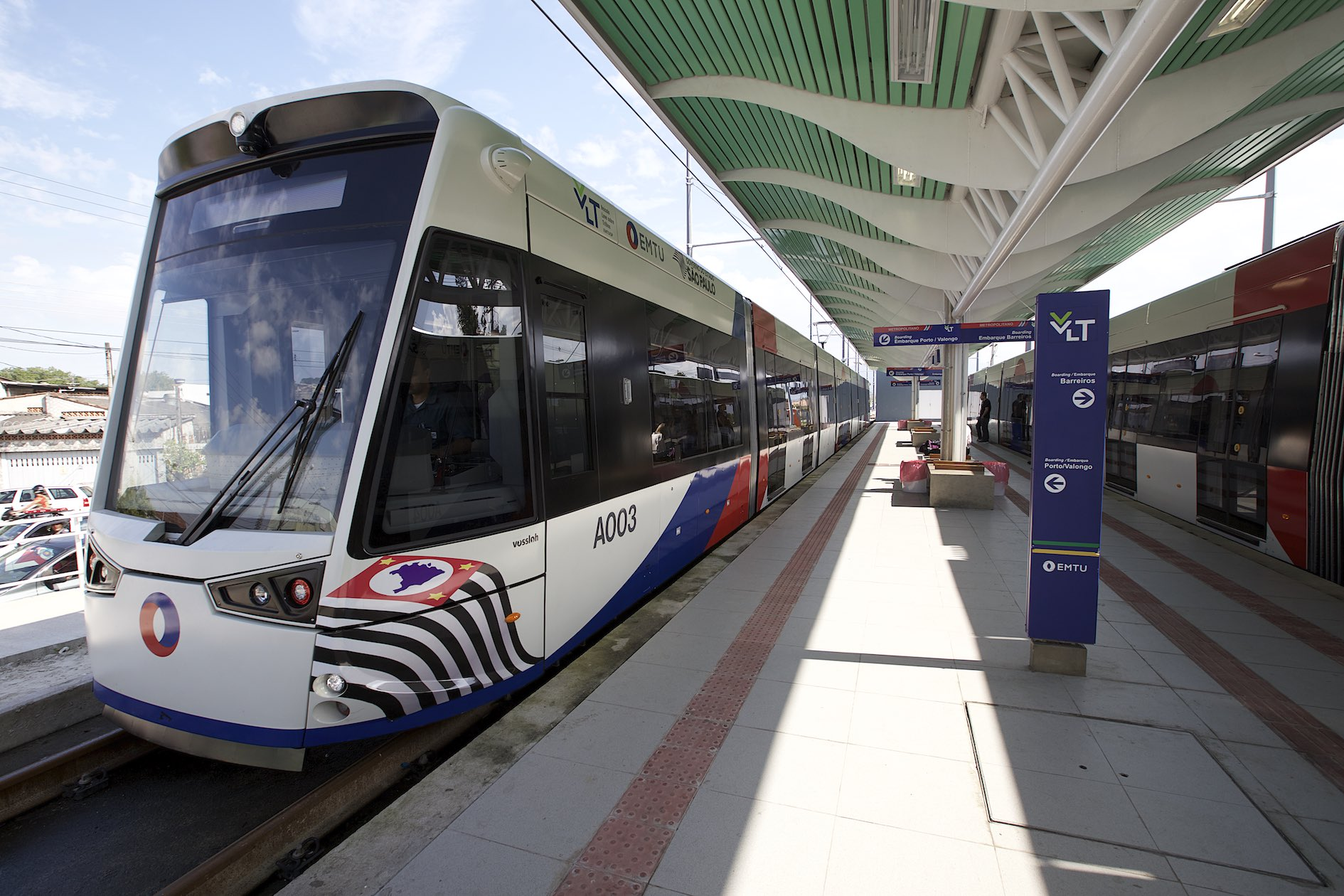
- Vossloh Tramlink V4, train which operates in the system

Overview
- Owner: Empresa Metropolitana de Transportes Urbanos
- Locale: Santos; São Vicente
- Transit type: Light rail transit
- Number of lines: 2
- Number of stations: 27
- Annual ridership: 7,000,000 passengers (2018)
- Website: www.emtu.sp.gov.br

Operation
- Began operation: 31 January 2016; 10 years ago
- Operator: Consórcio BR Mobilidade
- Number of vehicles: 22
- Train length: 44 m (144 ft)
- Headway: 10 min

Technical
- System length: 19.5 km (12.1 mi)
- Track gauge: 1,435 mm (4 ft 8 1/2 in)
- Electrification: Overhead line
- Average speed: 25 km/h (16 mph)
- Top speed: 70 km/h (43 mph)
System map
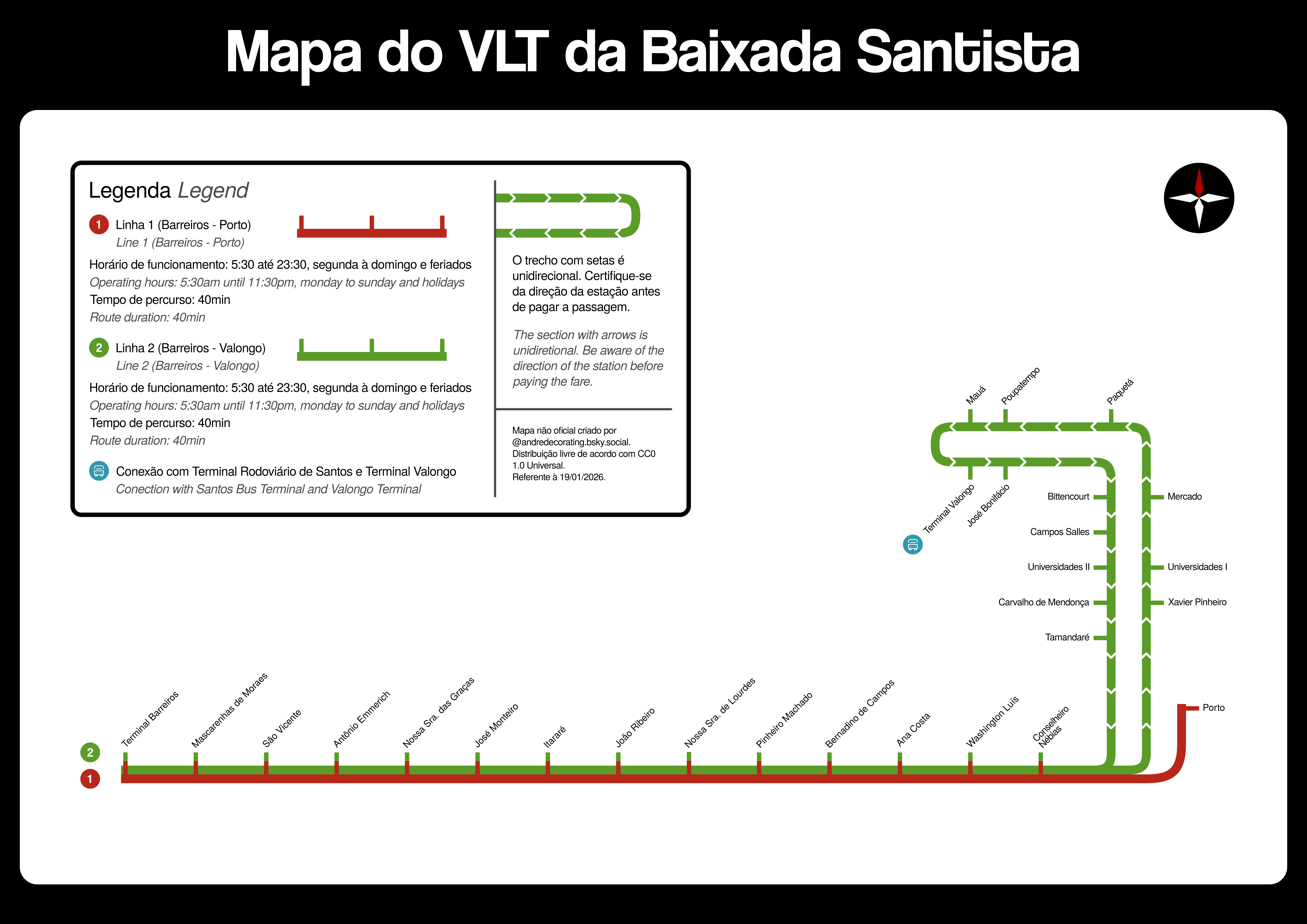

The Baixada Santista LRT (Portuguese: VLT da Baixada Santista) is a light rail transit system which operates in two cities in the Baixada Santista region, in the Brazilian state of São Paulo. It is operated by Consórcio BR Mobilidade.

It is composed of two lines. Line 1 has 15 stations and 11.5 km (7.1 mi) of track, while Line 2 has 26 stations (14 shared with Line 1) and 4.3 kilometres (2.7 mi) of dedicated track. The system began operating on 31 January 2016. A second stretch of the system, composed of 14 stations and 8 km (5.0 mi) of extension, is under construction.

Currently, it serves only the cities of Santos and São Vicente, but the cities of Cubatão and Praia Grande are planning future branches of the system.

== History ==
The project of the Baixada Santista LRT emerged as a way for the Government of São Paulo to reuse the tracks the central area of São Vicente and Santos inherited from FEPASA and built by Sorocabana, which operated in this stretch the Intra Metropolitan Train between 1990 and 1999, and was used for cargo transportation until January 2008.

On 29 May 2013, the construction of the first stretch of the LRT began after a ceremony with Governor Geraldo Alckmin, of President of Legislative Assembly of São Paulo Samuel Moreira, and other authorities. Previously, Alesp had approved a bill that authorized the State Government to contract a loan with financial institutes controlled by the Union, by the cost of R$ 400 million (US$ 185.1 million, as of 2013), so it could be invested in the project of the system.

On 22 May 2014, the first Vossloh Tramlink vehicle for the system arrived in the Port of Santos. The train, made in Valencia, is formed from seven modules and has capacity up to 400 passengers. On 6 June 2014, Governor Geraldo Alckmin opened the first 5 stations of the LRT system, besides it was not operational: Mascarenhas de Moraes, São Vicente, Antônio Emmerich, Nossa Senhora das Graças and José Monteiro. The first test was made on 30 August 2014 in a stretch of 1 km (0.62 mi), between stations Nossa Senhora das Graças and José Monteiro. Some details and the reaction of the composition were observed by Brazilian and foreign technicians.

On 18 November 2014, the LRT supervised operation began, which consisted of a trip of 10 minutes between stations Antônio Emmerich and Mascarenhas de Moraes. This operation was destinated to students of public and private institutions, groups previously registered and local residents. On 27 April 2015, the precursor operation began, with no charge, between stations Mascarenhas de Moraes and João Ribeiro. In this mode of operation, two composition operated from Mondays to Fridays, between 1PM to 4PM, with average speed of 20 km/h (12 mph) in a stretch of more than 6 km (3.7 mi).

The commercial operation of the system began on 31 January 2016, by charging a unit fare of R$3.80 (US$ 1.09). Between February and April 2016, the system operated daily between 9AM and 4PM. On 10 April, the opening hours were extended, working between 7AM and 7PM, making possible the use of the system during peak hours by workers in Baixada Santista. On 5 March 2017, the opening hours of the LRT were extended again, opening at 5:30AM and closing at 8PM. 52 days later, the closing hour was extended to 11:30PM.

On 15 June 2016, the LRT Operational Control Center (CCO) was opened, located next to the Porto rail yard. In the CCO, it's made the control of the operation, of the energy systems, of the electronic movement of the passengers (boarding and exit), and the security of stations and tracks. In Porto rail yard is located the train park, with capacity for up to 33 LRTs, and area for maintenance, train washing equipment, wheel grinding area, depots, administration, and energy sub-station.

On 19 June 2016, the LRT began integration with 37 metropolitan bus lines as part of the Metropolitan Integrated System, aiming to restructure the public transportation in Baixada Santista, providing the commuters more mobility with the economy.

The system was extended at both ends on 31 January 2017, thus bringing Line 1 to its current length of 11 kilometres (6.8 mi).

On 1 December 2025, limited services started on a second line, adding 12 stations and 4.3 kilometres (2.7 mi) of track to the system. Full services on Line 2 began in June 2026.
