= Nossa Senhora da Graça =

Nossa Senhora da Graça, which means "Our Lady of Grace" in Portuguese, can refer to:

- Nossa Senhora da Graça incident, a naval clash in 1610 near Nagasaki, Japan
- Nossa Senhora da Graça (1787), ship of the Portuguese Navy
- Nossa Senhora da Graça, a civil parish in Praia, Cape Verde (municipality)
- Nossa Senhora das Graças, a town in southern Brazil
- Nossa Senhora da Graça Fort, a fort in Portugal
