= Trams in Gotha =

Coordinates: 50°57′N 10°43′E

Gotha tramway network
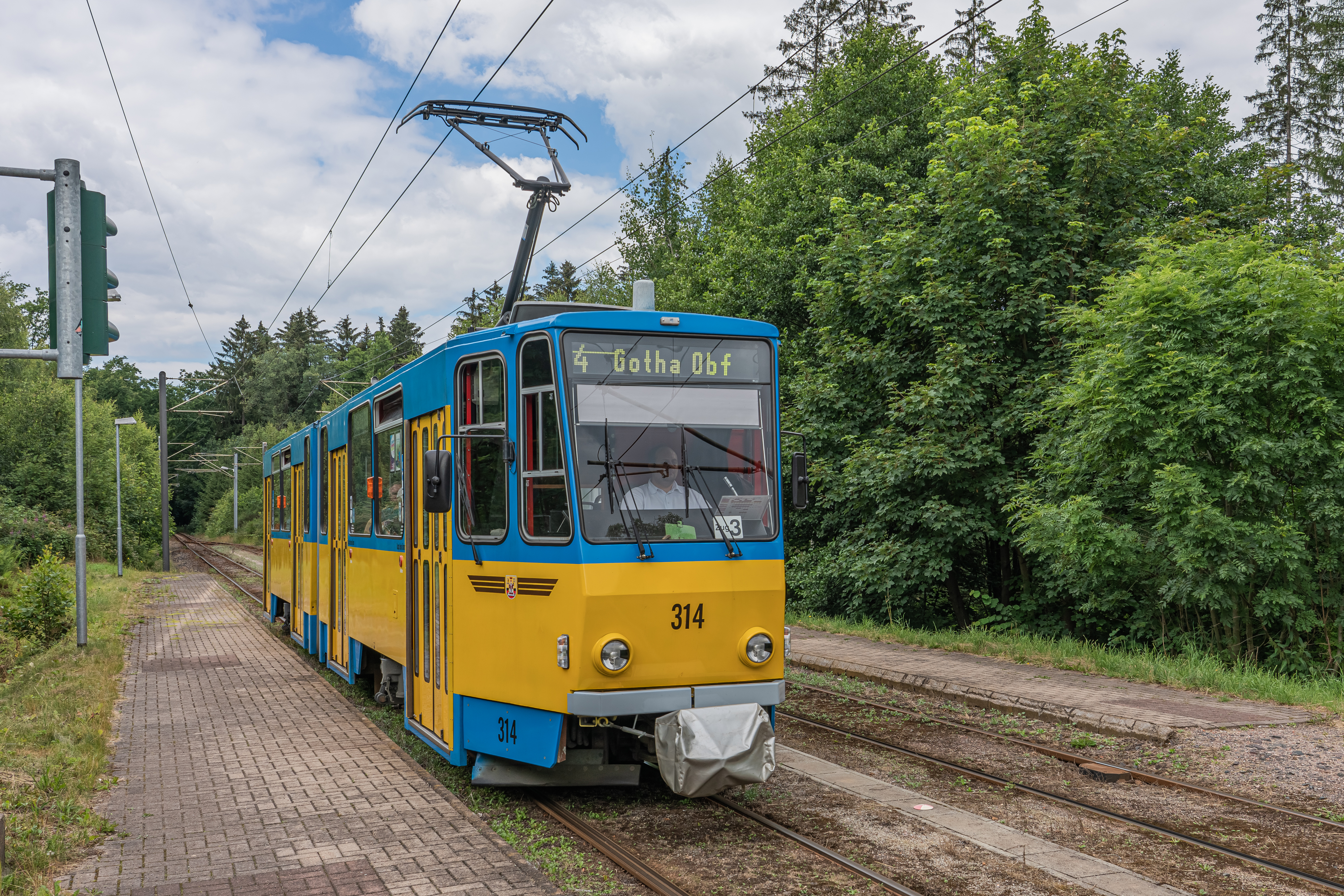
- Modernised Tatra KT4D tram in Friedrichroda

Operation
- Locale: Gotha, Thuringia, Germany
- Open: 1894
- Status: Operational
- Lines: 5
- Operator: Thüringerwaldbahn und Straßenbahn Gotha GmbH (TWSB)

Infrastructure
- Track gauge: 1,000 mm (3 ft 3 3/8 in)
- Propulsion system: Electricity
- Stock: 20

Statistics
Overview
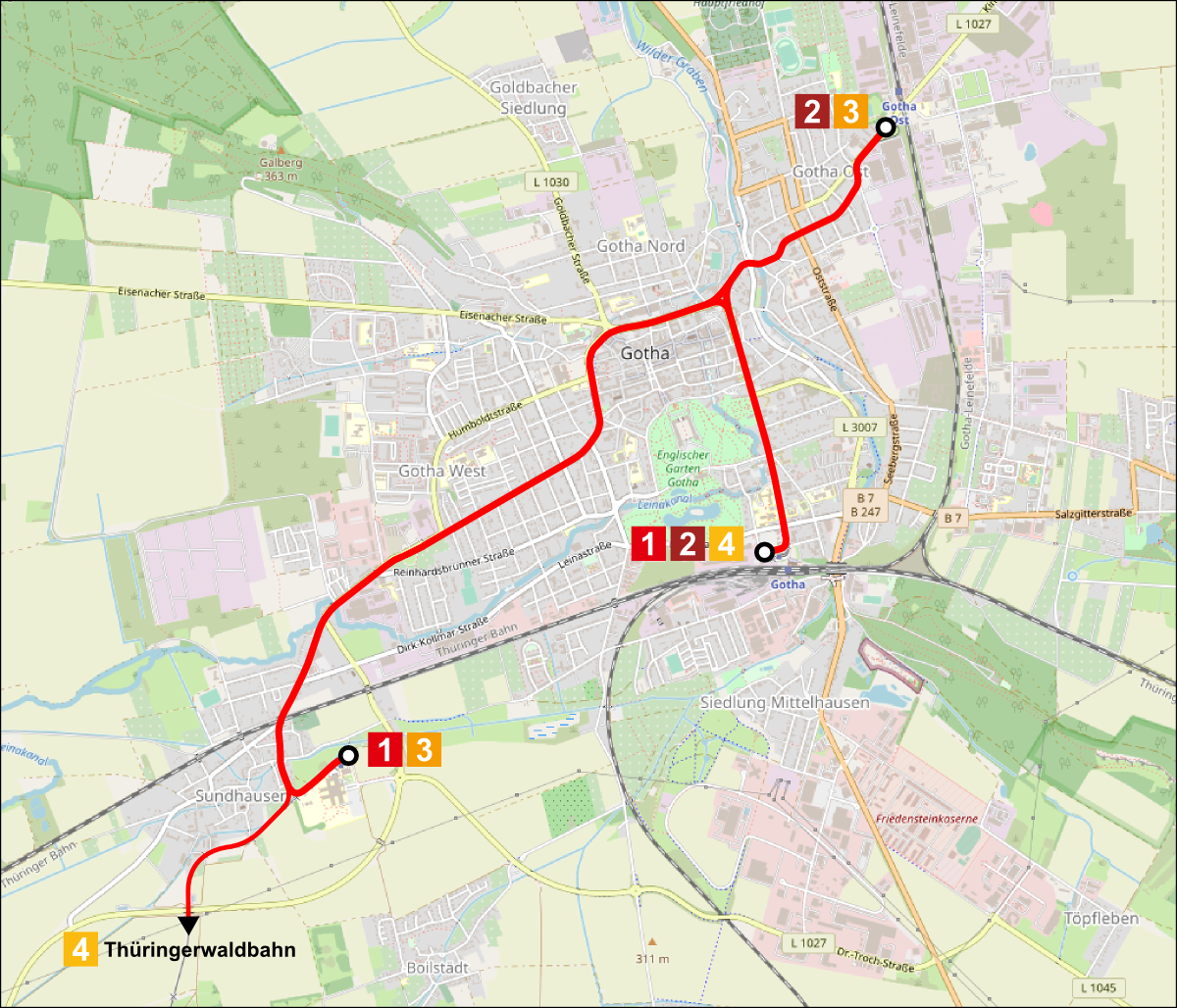
Gotha tramway network.
- Website: http://www.waldbahn-gotha.de Thüringerwaldbahn und Straßenbahn Gotha GmbH (in German)

The Gotha tramway network is a network of tramways forming part of the public transport system in Gotha, a city in the federal state of Thuringia, Germany.

The network was opened in 1894 with an electrified system implemented by Union-Elektricitäts-Gesellschaft. It is currently operated by Thüringerwaldbahn und Straßenbahn Gotha GmbH (TWSB), and integrated in the Verkehrsverbund Mittelthüringen (VMT).

== Lines ==
| Line | Route | Length | Travel time (min) | Stops | Headway (daytime) |
|---|---|---|---|---|---|
| 1 | Hauptbahnhof – Kreiskrankenhaus | 6.1 km | 22 min | 15 | 10 mins^{*} |
| 2 | Hauptbahnhof – Ostbahnhof | 3.0 km | 12 min | 8 | 20 mins |
| 3 | Waltershäuser Straße – Ostbahnhof | 4.0 km | 14 min | 10 | (3 services/day) |
| 4 | Thüringerwaldbahn; Gotha – Waltershausen Gleisdreieck – Friedrichroda – Bad Tabarz | 21.7 km (22.5 km incl. Krankenhaus) | 58 min | 22 | 30 mins |
| 6 | Waltershausen Gleisdreieck – Waltershausen Bahnhof | 2.4 km | 7 min | 5 | ≈ 30 mins |

Notes:

* The headway figure for line 1 takes into account the services on line 4.

Since the timetable change on 13 December 2009, there has been only one pair of line 4 trains each day via Krankenhaus. At other times, travellers to/from Krankenhaus must change to line 1 in Sundhausen.

The old line 3 linked the Huttenstraße with Hauptfriedhof with one intermediate stop, and was shut down on 30 June 1985. From 1 June 1985 to 1991, a SEV line 3 led from the old Busbahnhof to Hauptfriedhof. Today, this route is operated on Monday to Saturday by city bus line F and the evening line, on Monday to Friday by city bus line E, and on Sundays by city bus line B.

The branch line in Waltershausen formerly belonging to line 4 (between Waltershausen Bahnhof and Waltershausen-Gleisdreieck) has operated since August 2007 as line 6.

== Rolling stock ==
The fleet consists of three former Rhein-Neckar-Verkehr Düwag GT8 trams, 11 Tatra KT4D trams, and six Schindler trams formerly operated in Basel. As of July 2023, two of the former Basel trams are in active service, with one further tram planned to enter service in July 2023 and three trams awaiting refurbishment. Four Stadler Tramlink bi-directional trams were ordered in 2025, with deliveries planned for 2025 and 2026.

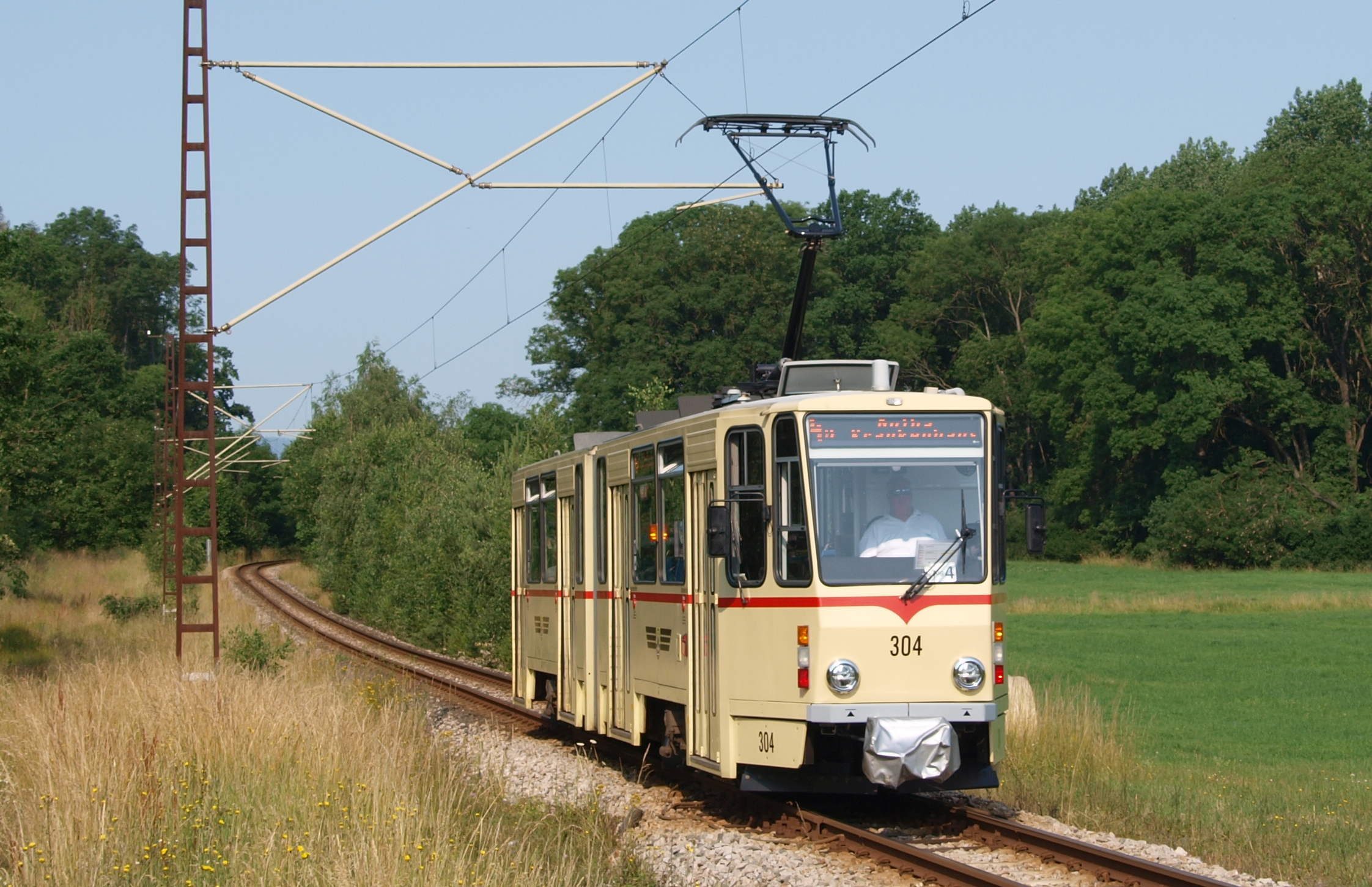
KT4D

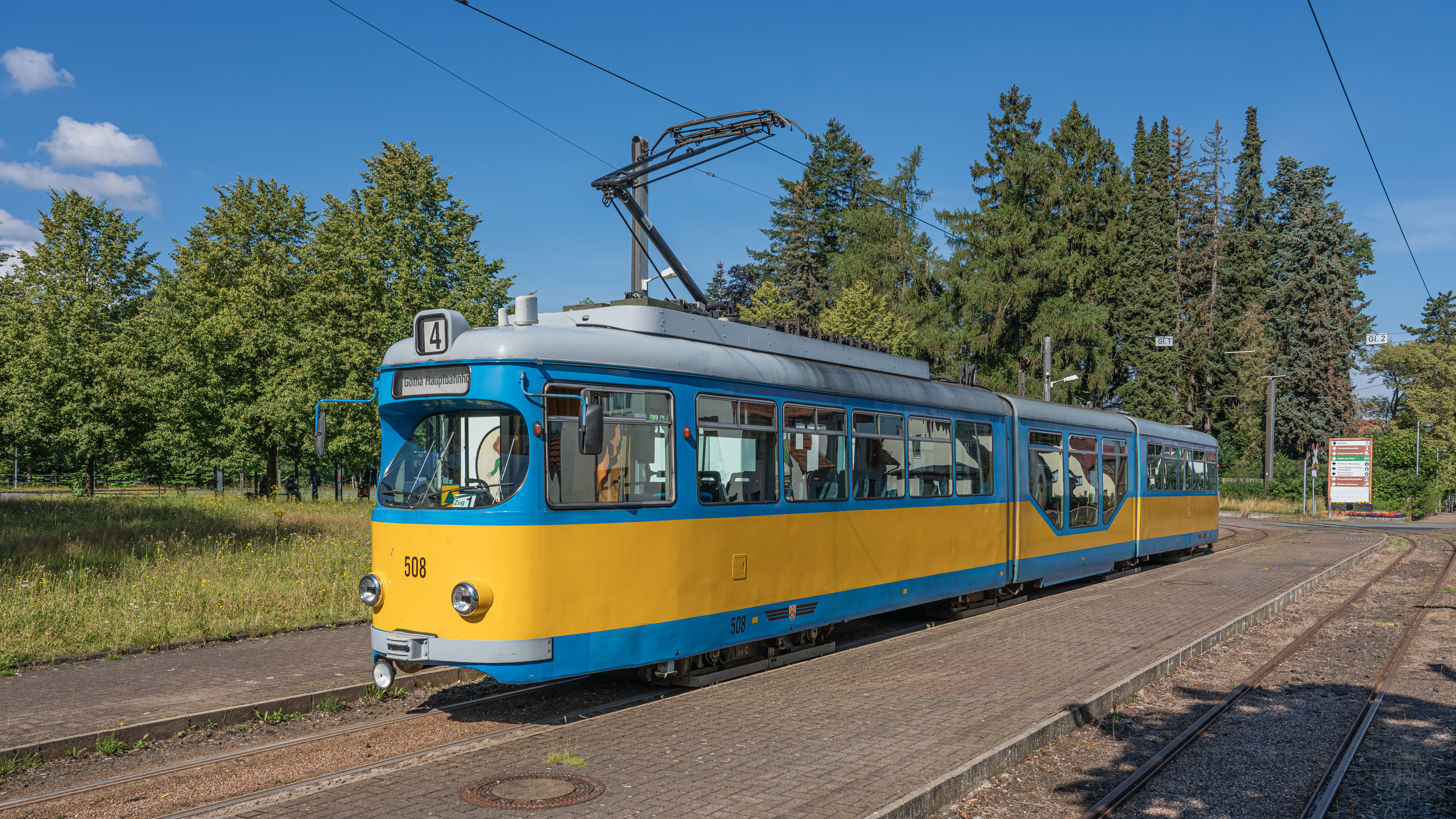
GT8NF

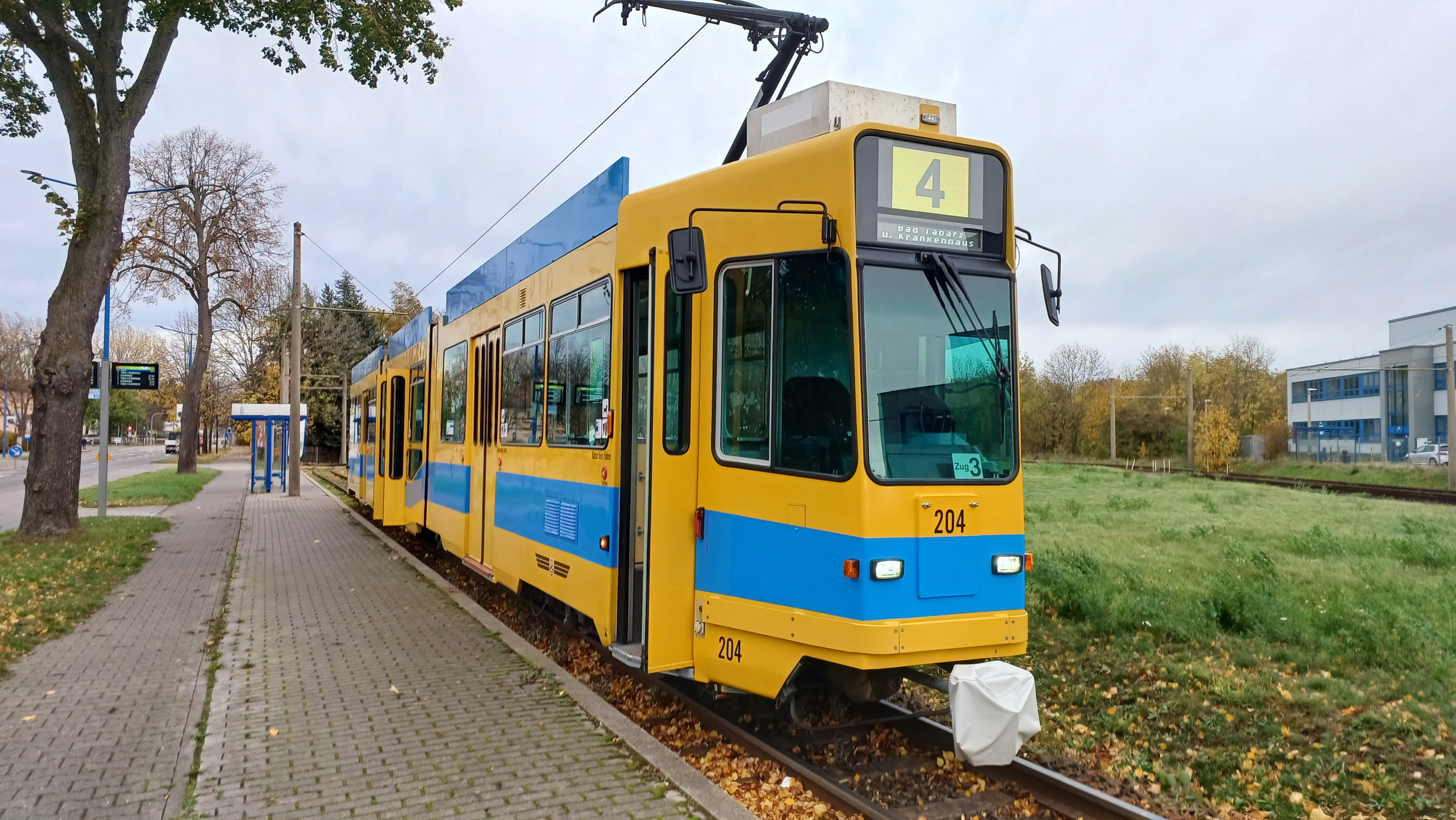
Be 4/8

== See also ==
- List of town tramway systems in Germany
- Trams in Germany
