= Line 1 (Baixada Santista LRT) =

Tram line in Brazil

Baixada Santista LRT Line 1
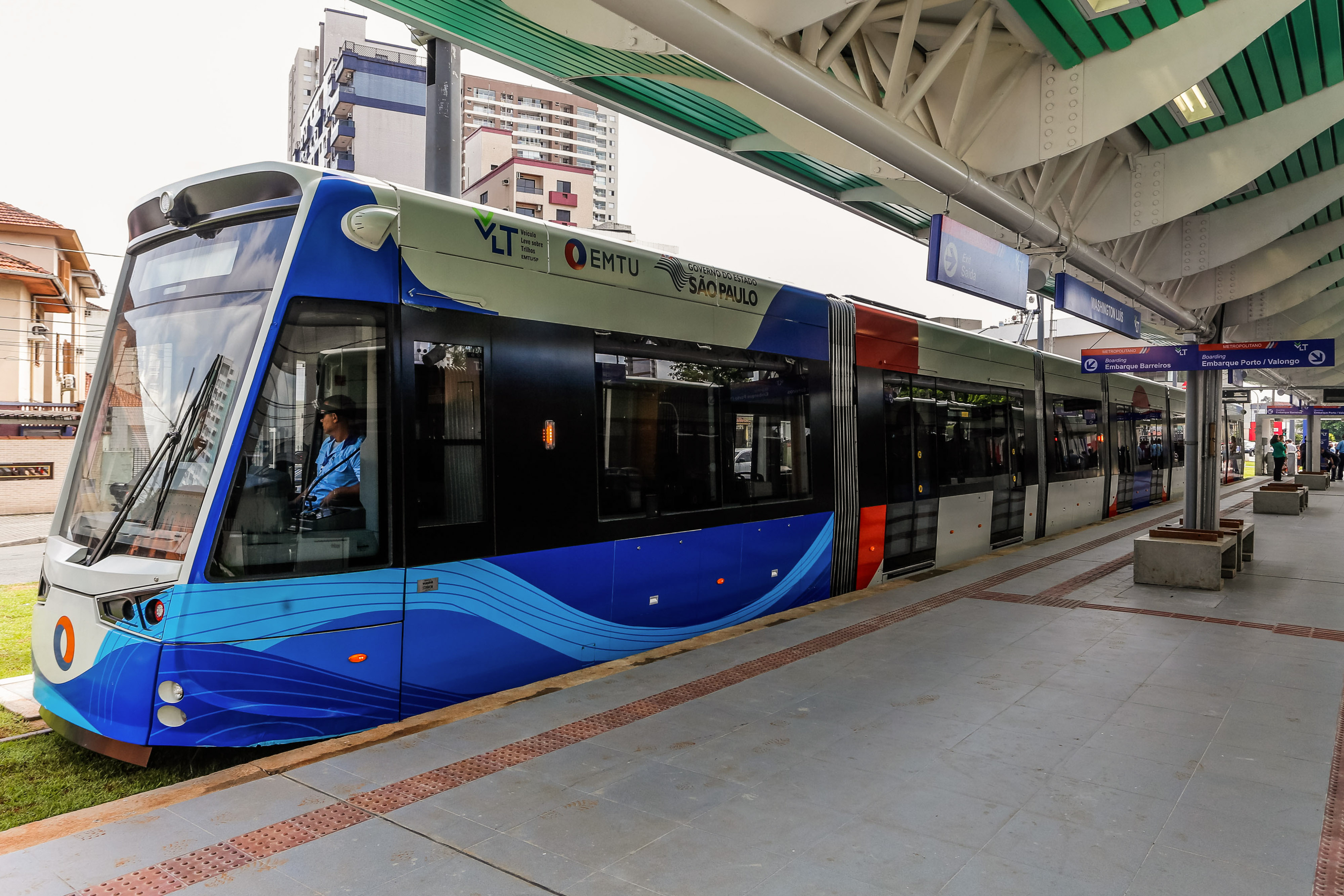

Overview
- Status: Operational
- Owner: Empresa Metropolitana de Transportes Urbanos
- Locale: Santos; São Vicente
- Termini: Porto; Barreiros
- Stations: 15

Service
- Type: Light rail transit
- System: Baixada Santista Light Rail
- Operator(s): Consórcio BR Mobilidade
- Depot(s): Port rail yard

History
- Opened: 31 January 2016; 10 years ago

Technical
- Line length: 11.5 km (7.1 mi)
- Track gauge: 1,435 mm (4 ft 8 1/2 in)
- Electrification: Overhead line
- Operating speed: 25 km/h (16 mph)

Line 1: Barreiros ↔ Porto is currently the only operational line of Baixada Santista Light Rail in São Paulo state, Brazil. It opened on 31 January 2016. It is 11.5 km (7.1 mi) long and has 15 stations in operation, all of them at-grade. The system is operated by Consórcio BR Mobilidade.

== History ==
This was the first LRT line built in Baixada Santista Metropolitan Region, under the responsibility of Empresa Metropolitana de Transportes Urbanos de São Paulo (EMTU), reusing the track that crosses the central areas of São Vicente and Santos, previously used by FEPASA which operated the Intra Metropolitan Train between 1990 and 1999, and was used for cargo transportation until January 2008.

== Stations ==
=== Barreiros ↔ Porto ===
| # | Name | Opened | City |
|---|---|---|---|
| 1 | Barreiros | 31 January 2017 | São Vicente |
| 2 | Mascarenhas de Moraes | 6 June 2014 | São Vicente |
| 3 | São Vicente | 6 June 2014 | São Vicente |
| 4 | Antônio Emmerich | 6 June 2014 | São Vicente |
| 5 | Nossa Senhora das Graças | 6 June 2014 | São Vicente |
| 6 | José Monteiro | 6 June 2014 | São Vicente |
| 7 | Itararé | 23 June 2015 | São Vicente |
| 8 | João Ribeiro | 23 June 2015 | São Vicente |
| 9 | Nossa Senhora de Lourdes | 23 June 2015 | Santos |
| 10 | Pinheiro Machado | 23 June 2015 | Santos |
| 11 | Bernardino de Campos | 27 April 2016 | Santos |
| 12 | Ana Costa | 31 January 2017 | Santos |
| 13 | Washington Luís | 31 January 2017 | Santos |
| 14 | Conselheiro Nébias | 14 February 2017 | Santos |
| 15 | Porto | 31 January 2017 | Santos |
