= TramCamp =

Planned regional tram system in Camp de Tarragona, Catalonia, Spain

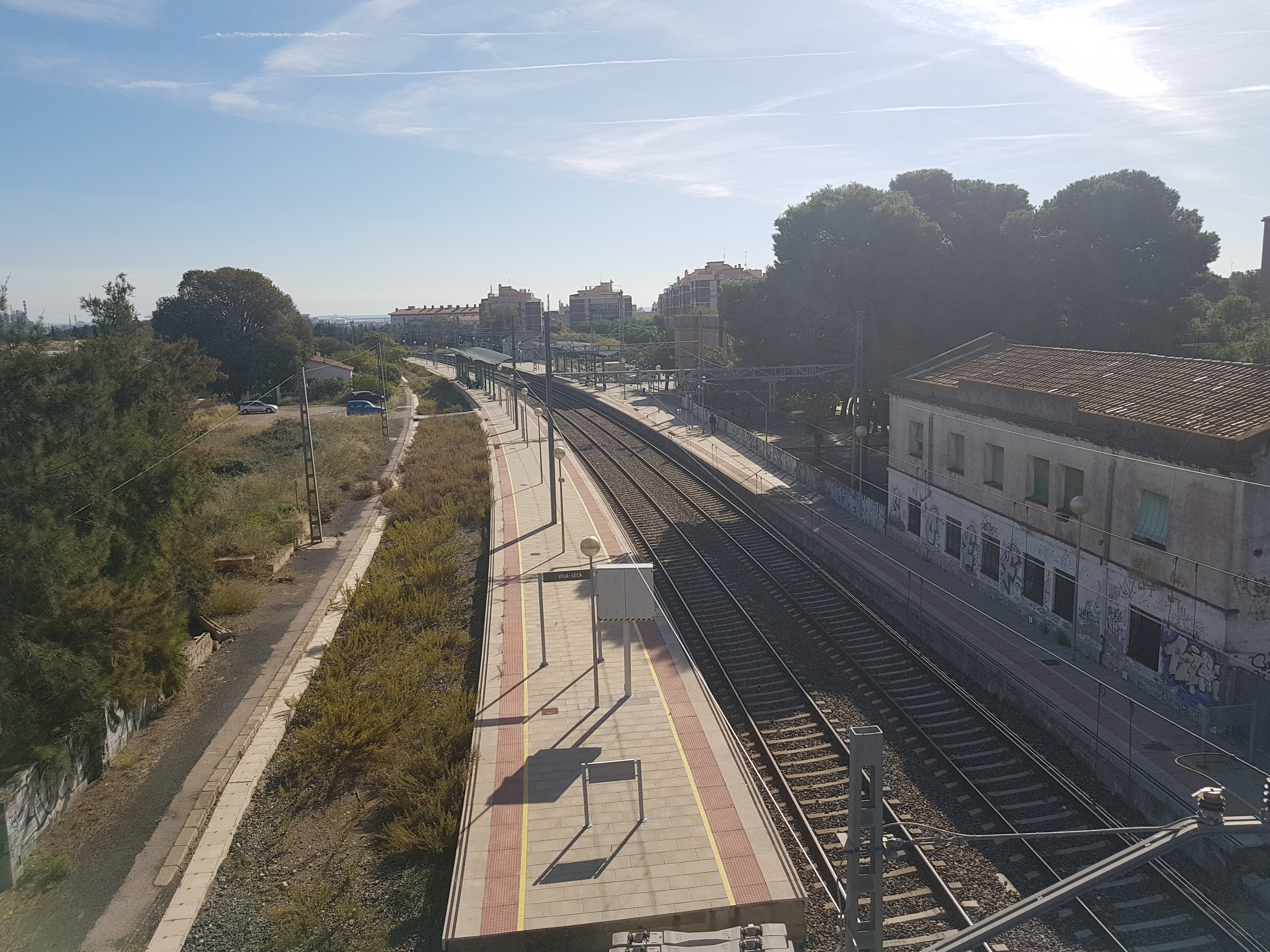
- Vila-seca station, to be served by the tram line

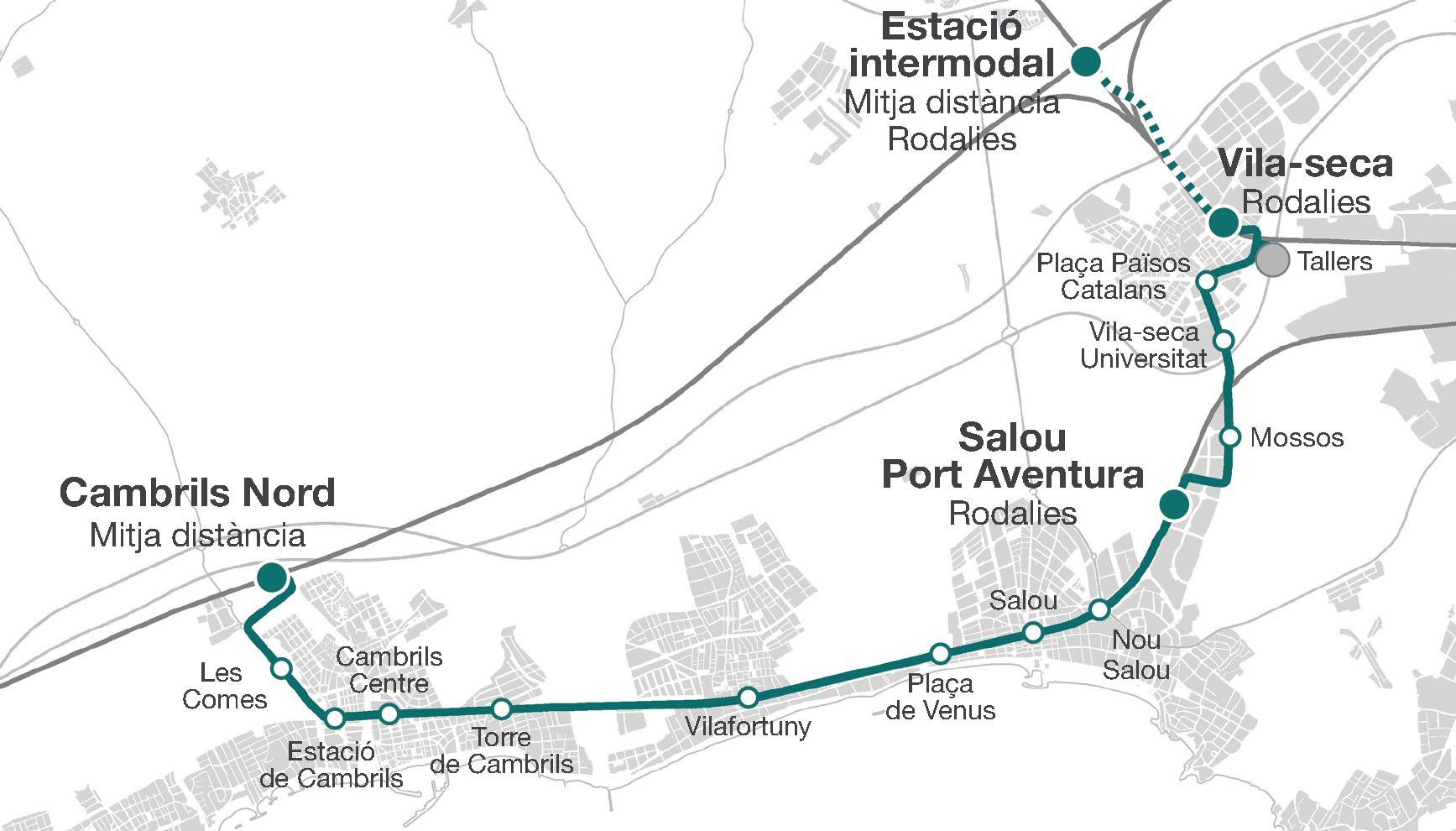
- Phase 1 map

Overview
- Native name: Tramvia del Camp de Tarragona
- Owner: Generalitat de Catalunya
- Locale: Camp de Tarragona
- Transit type: tramway
- Number of stations: 14 (phase 1)
- Annual ridership: 9.5 million (estimate)

Operation
- Operation will start: 2028 (phase 1)
- Operator: Ferrocarrils de la Generalitat de Catalunya (FGC)
- Number of vehicles: 7 (phase 1)

Technical
- System length: 14 km (8.7 mi) (phase 1)
- Track gauge: 1,435 mm (4 ft 8 1/2 in) standard gauge

TramCamp or Tramvia del Camp de Tarragona is a planned tramway in the Camp de Tarragona region of Catalonia, Spain. When fully completed, it will serve the municipalities of Tarragona, Reus, Vila-seca, Salou and Cambrils as well as Reus Airport.

The project will be built in stages. The first phase will link Cambrils, Salou and Vila-seca using the right-of-way of a discontinued Iberian-gauge line. The new system will use standard gauge. The first phase is expected to be ready by the end of 2029. The second phase will extend the tram network to Reus and Tarragona with a branch to Reus airport.

== History ==
Going back into history, Tarragona operated horse-drawn trams between 1883 and 1896, but had no electric trams. A trolley bus service operated between 1952 and 1973, but was discontinued due to reliability problems. There was also a metre-gauge railway line running between Reus with Salou until 1975, using diesel railcars in its last years. Until January 2020, there was an Iberian-gauge coastal rail line running between Valencia and Tarragona. When this line was relocated to the north, it eliminated direct rail service from Cambrils and Salou to Tarragona and Reus. After local protests, studies were conducted for a tram-train, initially considering the use of Iberian gauge to make use of partially abandoned railway lines with the option of building new infrastructure. (Later studies would switch the project to use standard gauge.) At this time, regional public transit was limited to city buses and a few suburban railway lines linking the region to Barcelona. Compared to other regions in Spain, public transport had a lower ridership with private automobiles being predominantly used.

Proposals for a tram-train in Camp de Tarragona have appeared in various regional government plans since 2001. In that year, the Generalitat de Catalunya commissioned a feasibility study for creating a tram-train to link various municipalities in Camp de Tarragona. In 2003, the consortium ATM Camp de Tarragona was established with the objective to create the tram-train network. However, in 2006, the tram-train proposal was omitted from regional plans for new infrastructure, an omission that drew criticism form various associations and municipalities. Plans for a tram-train were reinstated. Two options were proposed. The tram-train could run on either the current infrastructure after being freed up by the construction of the separate Mediterranean Corridor (implementation: 2006–2016), or it could run on newly constructed track (implementation: 2016–2026).

The project was relaunched after almost ten years of inactivity. In March 2020, the Catalan government commissioned the FGC to carry out feasibility and environmental impact studies for a first section of fifteen stations between Cambrils and Tarragona via Salou and Vila-seca. These studies were made public in February 2021. The feasibility study proposed an Iberian gauge network using the conventional railway between Vila-seca and Tarragona.

In May 2021, the start of work was initially announced for the year 2022, then modified to between January 2022 and 2023. The first phase was limited to the section between Cambrils and Vila-seca station via Salou, with a change to use standard gauge. The technical studies for the second phase, linking Vila-seca to Tarragona via La Canonja and Reus using new infrastructure, were to be completed in the summer of 2023. The decision to build new track resulted from concerns by municipal authorities of Tarragona of saturating the existing tracks which had passenger and goods traffic. All these modifications transformed the tram-train project into a tramway with interurban sections.

The environmental impact study for the first phase promoted the use of a disused railway line between the old Cambrils station and the Salou - Port Aventura station, plus the construction of new rail infrastructure running parallel to Pere-Molas Avenue to Vila-seca station. In December 2023, the Catalan government and the rail network manager ADIF concluded an agreement to transfer the old railway right-of-way between Cambrils and Salou in order to build the new tramway there.

On September 4, 2024, phase 1 of the project was unveiled. The municipality of Salou, which was highly critical of the project, finally agreeing to it after obtaining funding for the urban redevelopment along the tramway and the development of a one-kilometer section without overhead power wires. The special urban development plan for the entire route was approved three months later by regional authorities. Funding for phase 1 was formally approved on December 10 by the executive of the autonomous community.

On 19 January 2025, the President of the Government of Catalonia made an official presentation of phase 1 of the project in Cambrils, indicating that construction would start in the summer of 2025 with the line expected to be in service in 2028.

By July 2025, the Department of Territory, Housing and Ecological Transition Territori, Habitatge i Transició Ecològica) awarded the first infrastructure works for phase 1 of the tramway with the expectation that construction would start in September 2025 and last 20 months. By 2026, the construction start time was revised to the summer of 2026, with construction lasting 25 months. Phase 1 of line would go into service by 2029.

== Costs ==
The construction costs for phase 1 of the project (Cambrils, Salou and Vilaseca) are:

- 245 million euros of total investment
- 38.5 million euros for 7 trams
- 26.6 million euros to improve mobility on foot and by bicycle, with subsidies to the municipalities of Cambrils, Salou and Vila-seca

The European Union has agreed to co-finance the project.

The project requires the construction of a bridge for the tramway to cross Highway A-7. The bridge will be 112 metres long and cost 15.8 million euros.

== Description ==
External image
- Tramcamp after completion of phase 2

The first phase of TramCamp will use the right-of-way of an abandoned Iberian-gauge railway line that ran mostly along the Mediterranean coast. Linking Cambrils, Salou and Vila-seca, the route in phase 1 would be 14 kilometres (8.7 mi) long and have 14 stations, three of which (at Cambrils Nord, Salou-Port Aventura and Vila-seca) would be transfer hubs with connections to the Rodalies de Catalunya network. Within Salou, one kilometre of the line would not have an overhead wire. In Vila-seca, a 112 m (367 ft) bridge will be built to carry the tram line over the A-7 highway. Some sections of the line will run in the streets. In future, some of the line may be used by the FGC, the Catalan railway. The network will use standard gauge.

Concurrent with the TramCamp project, Selou plans to build a new avenue called Eix Cívic (Civic Axis) along 2 kilometres (1.2 mi) of the former railway right-of-way through the town centre. The new avenue will have pedestrian and bicycle paths along with the new tram line. The tramway will pass through a large, new central plaza in the former station area, where the old railway tracks and station have been demolished.

In phase 1, the line will use seven Stadler Tramlink V3 bidirectional, low-floor trams. The trams will be built at a Stadler facility in Albuixech, Valencia. The five-section trams will be 33.62 metres (110.3 ft) metres long, and will be able to carry up to 210 passengers. The trams will provide for bicycles, strollers and people with reduced mobility. Each tram will have three bogies. Their maximum speed will be 81 kilometres per hour (50 mph). The trams will be equipped with lithium batteries to travel up to 9.9 kilometres (6.2 mi) without an overhead wire. The tram depot will be in Vila-Seca.

Phase 2 would extend the tram network to Reus and Tarragona with a branch to Reus airport. In addition to the three interchange hubs from phase 1, phase 2 would provide seven more: three in Reus, one at the airport, two in Tarragona and a tenth at the Camp de Tarragona AVE station. If all phases of the project are completed, the tram network would have a total length of 46 kilometres (29 mi) with 47 stations and 10 interchange hubs. The forecasted annual ridership is 9.5 million, which could exceed 12 million after 15 years.

== See also ==
- Autoritat Territorial de la Mobilitat del Camp de Tarragona
