= Nossa Senhora das Graças =

Coordinates: 22°51′S 51°46′W

- Municipality
- Location of Nossa Senhora Das Graças in Paraná
- Interactive map of Nossa Senhora das Graças
- Country: Brazil
- Region: Southern
- State: Paraná
- Mesoregion: Noroeste Paranaense

Population (2020)
  - Total: 4,008
- Time zone: UTC−3 (BRT)

Nossa Senhora das Graças is a municipality in the state of Paraná in the Southern Region of Brazil.

== History ==
Municipality created through State Law No. 4245 of July 28, 1960, and installed on December 1, 1961. The municipality was dismembered from Guaraci.

The name of the municipality is a tribute to its patron saint, celebrated on November 27.

== See also ==
- List of municipalities in Paraná
