= Bi-directional vehicle =

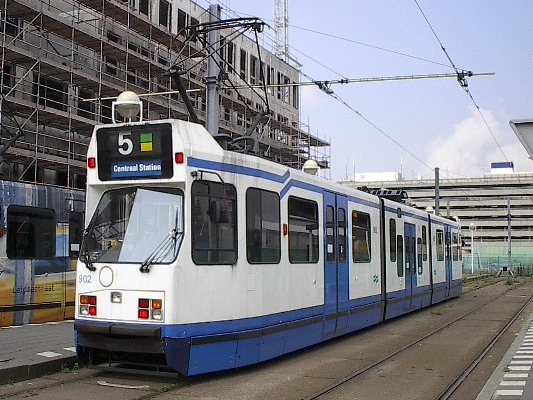
The trams operating on route 5 of the Amsterdam tram network are bi-directional vehicles. Notice the doors on the opposite side of the normal travel direction.

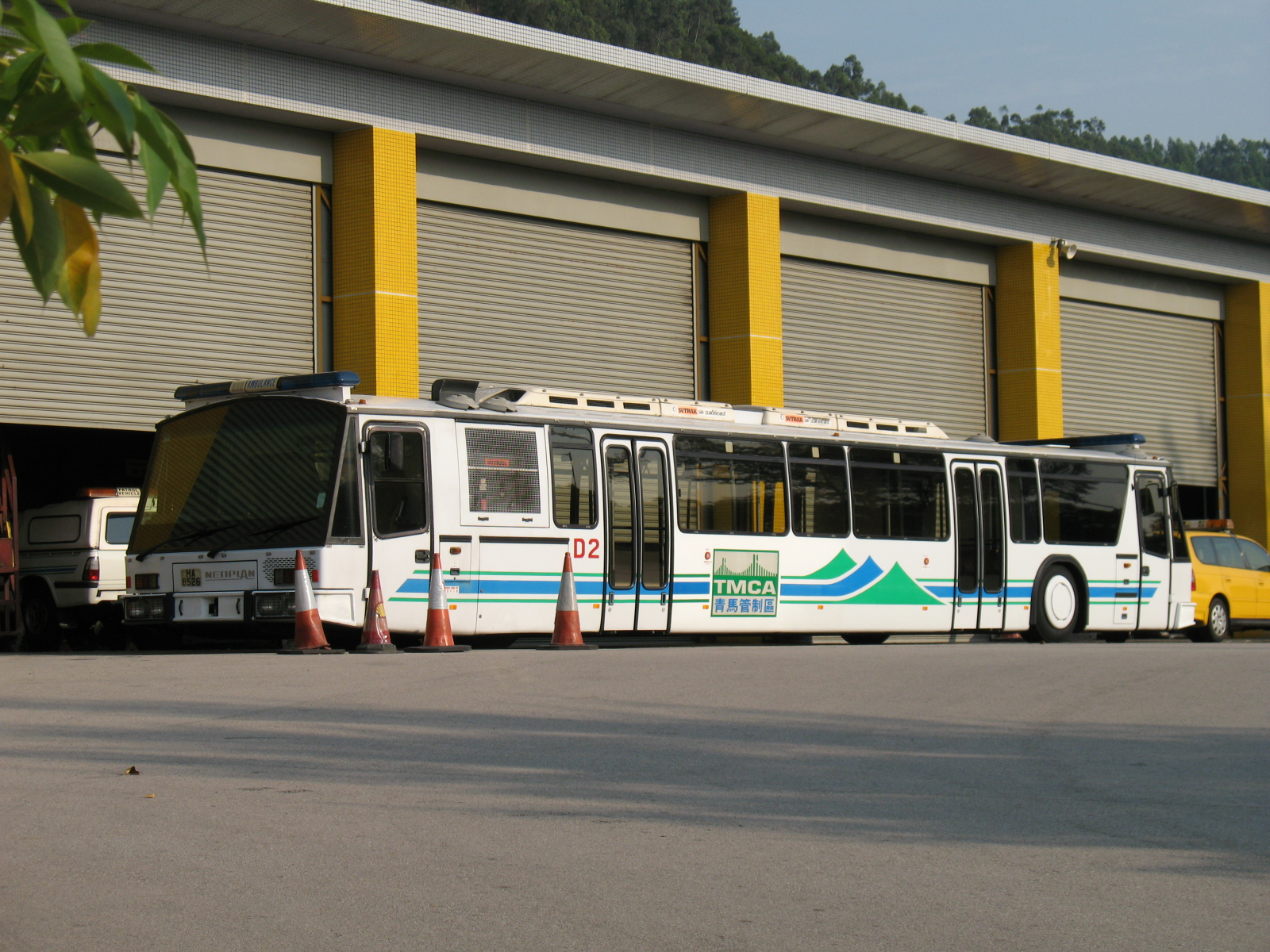
Double-ended Neoplan Airliner N 922-2 apron bus, converted to an ambulance

A control car of a push-pull train in Switzerland. Control cars make locomotive-hauled trains bi-directional.

A bi-directional vehicle, also known as a double-ended vehicle, is a vehicle that can be driven in either direction, forwards or backwards. Usually, the term refers to rail vehicles, such as trains or trams, and some airside transfer buses, that are equipped with driver's cabs at both ends. These vehicles generally have entry and exit doors on either side of the vehicle.

One major benefit of bi-directional vehicles is the ability to reverse direction at a terminal station with a stub-end track. On a system using double track, a crossover switch is often used to move the vehicle to the other track. This situation contrasts with the use of uni-directional vehicles, which requires the use of a balloon loop, triangle junction, or turntable to reverse direction.

Aside from eliminating the need for complicated railway infrastructure to turn vehicles around, the presence of doors on either side of the vehicle enables the use of island platforms. These extra doors come at the cost of reduction of seating on board the vehicle.
