= Uni-directional vehicle =

Term generally for trains or trams that only move forward

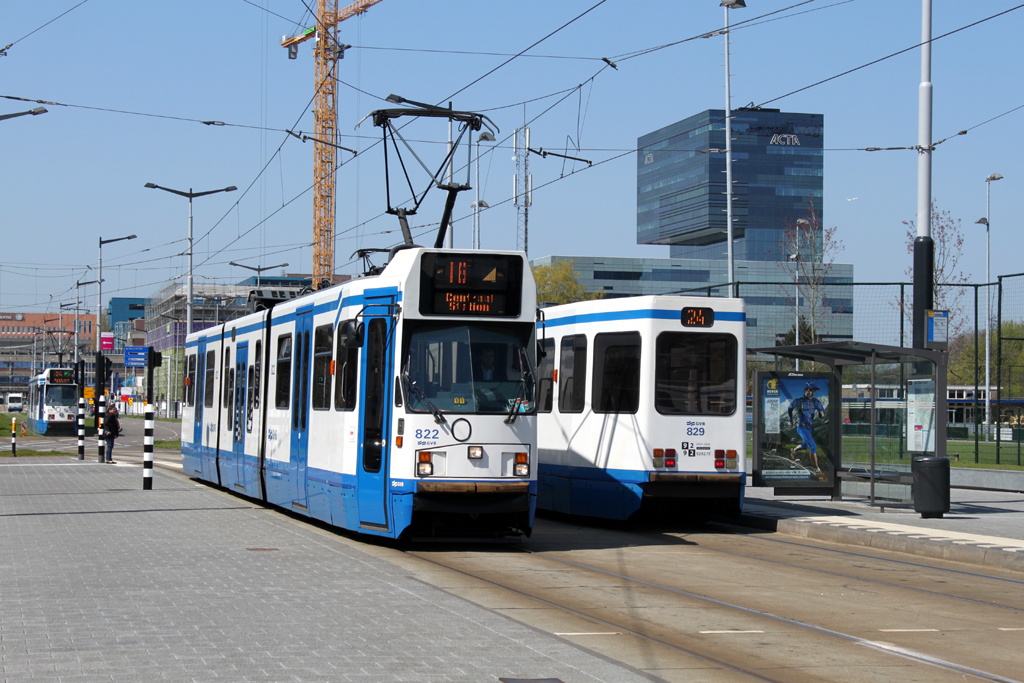
Most trams on the Amsterdam tram network are uni-directional vehicles. Notice the distinguishable rear end of the vehicle on the right.

A uni-directional vehicle is a vehicle that is normally designed to operate only in the forward direction. While the vast majority of road vehicles are like this, the term generally refers to a train or tram with a distinguishable front and rear end and a single operating cab at the front end. These vehicles often have the capability to operate in reverse, though such operations are limited to low speeds and short distances, such as shunting.

Uni-directional vehicles commonly have entry and exit doors on only one side of the vehicle (usually the sidewalk side), although some are equipped with doors on both sides, or operate in opposing traffic flow, to facilitate the use of island platforms. Having doors on only one side allows for an increase in seating on board the vehicle, compared to bi-directional vehicles which have doors on both sides.

Because a uni-directional vehicle can only travel in one direction they require special infrastructure for turning around at a terminal station. This is usually a balloon loop on tram systems, while mainline railways tend to use a triangle junction or turntable.

Unidirectional trams and streetcars operate in many parts of the world, with a significant number running in Continental European cities such as Rotterdam, Amsterdam, Zurich, Berlin, Düsseldorf, and Vienna.

In Asia, uni-directional vehicles can be found in Hong Kong (both tram and light rail) and Kolkata. In North America, modern uni-directional streetcars operate in Toronto and Philadelphia, while historic uni-directional streetcars can be found in San Francisco, Philadelphia and El Paso.
