= Rhônexpress =

Airport rail link in Lyon, France

Coordinates: 45.7602°N 4.8620°E

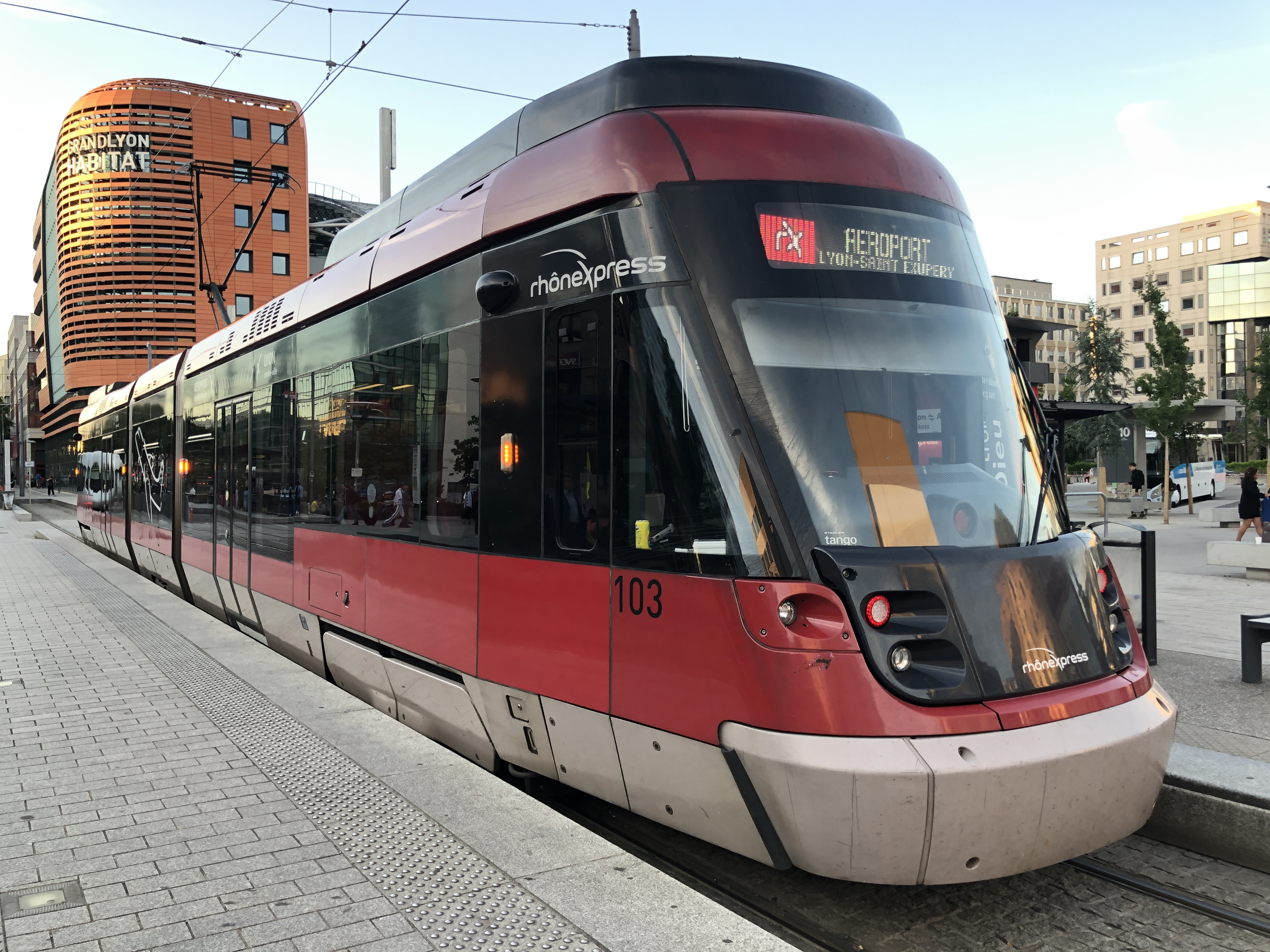
- Tram at Lyon-Part-Dieu

Overview
- Owner: SYTRAL Mobilités (in French)
- Locale: Greater Lyon, Auvergne-Rhône-Alpes, France
- Transit type: Express tram-train/Airport rail link
- Number of lines: 1
- Number of stations: 4
- Annual ridership: 1.28 million (2016)
- Website: www.rhonexpress.fr

Operation
- Began operation: 9 August 2010; 16 years ago
- Operator: Rhônexpress
- Number of vehicles: 6 Stadler Tango trainsets

Technical
- System length: 23 km (14 mi)
- Top speed: 100 km/h (62 mph)
System map
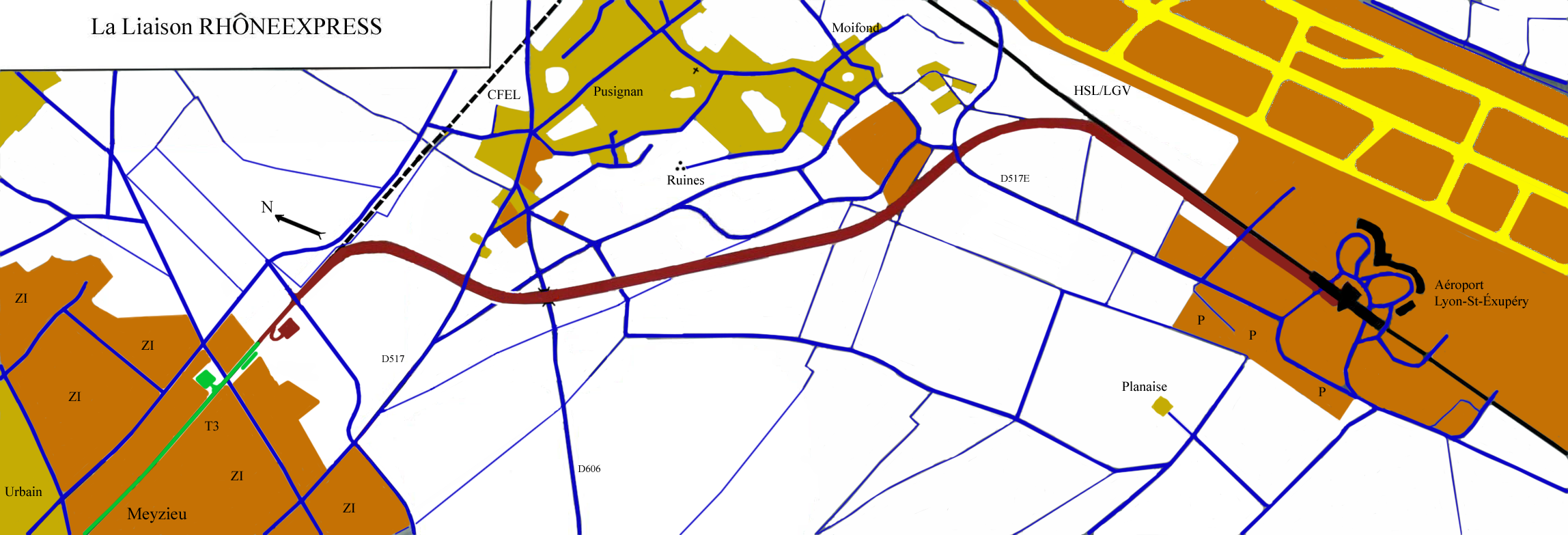
Project map for Rhônexpress (T3 tramline in green)

Rhônexpress (French pronunciation: [ʁonɛkspʁɛs]) is an express tram-train service which links Lyon, France, with its main airport, Lyon–Saint-Exupéry Airport, and the TGV railway station located there. At its opening in 2010, it became one of the most expensive airport-to-city lines in Europe per kilometre.

The route is 23 kilometres (14 mi) long, and served by six tram-train sets, built by Swiss manufacturer Stadler Rail. The route from the airport to the city's business center at Part-Dieu Villette (Lyon-Part-Dieu railway station) by way of Vaulx-en-Velin – La Soie (for transfer to Metro Line A) and Meyzieu takes roughly half an hour. Services run every 15–30 minutes.

The project included building 8.5 kilometres (5.3 mi) of new tracks, while the remainder of the route runs along the existing T3 tram line, on which passing tracks were built in some stations to allow express service. The service is independently run and is not a part of the TCL system, although it appears on TCL maps. The Conseil général of the Rhône franchised the operation of this line for 30 years to Rhônexpress, a consortium including Vinci SA (28.2%), Veolia Transport (28.2%), Vossloh Infrastructure Service (4.2%), Cegelec Centre Est (2.8%) and the Caisse des dépôts et consignations. It opened on 9 August 2010.

A parallel route, included in the TCL fare, has been available since September 2025 via the creation of the C200 bus line. The journey takes approximately 1 hour from Part-Dieu Villette Station by taking the Tram T3 of the Lyon tramway to Vaulx-en-Velin - La Soie then the C200 to Lyon-Saint-Exupéry Airport

== Background and construction ==
During February 2001, the General Council of the Rhone and SYTRAL, the urban transport authority for Lyon metropolitan area, announced their intentions to introduce a double-deck streetcar service that would run between Lyon Part-Dieu, Meyzieu ZI and Lyon Saint Exupery. Upon completion, it would become the only public transportation system between Lyon and Saint-Exupéry. SYTRAL oversaw the construction of the initial line, commonly referred to as the T3 Links, which ran between Lyon Part-Dieu and Meyzieu ZI; its commissioning in December 2006 represented a major milestone for the project.

During January 2007, a concession contract covering the second line of the RhônExpress was signed by both the General Council Chairman and RhônExpress consortium, the latter being responsible for the full implementation of the project, including design, financing, construction, and maintenance activities. This new link between downtown Lyon and its airport was developed under a public-private partnership (PPP). Its estimated cost was stated to be €120m; it was financed by the consortium through various means, €40m was received through several grants, another €62m came through borrowing by RhônExpress, while the remainder was contributed by its shareholders; all debt is to be repaid with the support of the Department, which provides an annual retainer to the consortium.

During July 2008, the tramway was declared to be a public utility; construction work commenced three months later. Both design and construction were managed by a variety of companies, including VINCI, Eurovia Railway Works (ETF), Cegelec Centre Est, Campenon Bernard Management, South East EJL and Roiret Transport. The completed line is also managed by a consortium, headed by VINCI, which was awarded the concession to operate it for a fixed period of 30 years.

During 2009, much of the tramway's infrastructure was built, delivery of the rolling stock also took place around this timeframe. The line is electrified; to provide this electrification along the new section of line, a pair of substations were built to power the newly installed overhead catenary wire. This is energised at 750V DC, suitable for operating the tram-trains at speeds of up to 100 km/h (62 mph). The line's support infrastructure includes a dedicated operations centre, comprising offices and maintenance facilities, along with storage sidings for the rolling stock, a sand replenishment station and vehicle cleaning facilities. Both day-to-day operations of the tramway and all maintenance activities associated with it are responsibilities of the consortium.

== Operations ==
Trial operations of the new line occurred during February 2010 while commercial operations started in August of that year. Since launch, the trams have been typically run at a 15-minute interval at peak hours, which fall between 6am and 9pm. A reduced service level runs every 30 minutes between 5am and 6am, as well as between 9pm and midnight. The consortium has reportedly been allocated funds to acquire additional tram-trains in the future. In anticipation of the future growth in passenger numbers, all of the stations were constructed to accommodate double trains if required.

By early 2019, the Rhônexpress had reportedly carried in excess of 10 million passengers since its inauguration nine years prior; during 2018 alone, it was recorded that over 1.5 million passengers had used the line, an 8.6 percent increase from the previous year. However, the system has been criticised for its high prices, as well as for being awarded contractual rights for a monopoly along its route, the latter having been subject to legal challenges. During the 2010s, multiple petitions have been organised, calling for a reduction in the fares on the Rhônexpress. During April 2019, the Lyon Metropole commenced negotiations with the consortium, intending to secure a decrease in fares; David Kimelfeld, President of the Lyon Metropole, declared that: "We can’t sit back and let it continue like this". Reportedly, if a compromise cannot be found, the existing agreement that the Rhônexpress is operated under may be terminated.

== Fares and ticketing ==
Tickets are sold online and from ticket vending machines at each stop, with full-fare tickets costing €17.10 single and €29.80 return. Discounts are offered for youths (age 12-25), passengers connecting to or from a long-distance train at St. Exupéry, the disabled, and airport staff, and children under 12 are free of charge. Ticket purchase on-board is subject to a €4 supplement.

== Route and stations ==
Rhônexpress uses the line T3 infrastructure built by SYTRAL from Lyon to Meyzieu (a hub for commuters with a large surface parking lot available). From there, new tracks were built specifically for Rhônexpress all the way to Lyon-Saint Exupéry Airport. The route has a total length of 22 km (14 mi), 7 km (4.3 mi) of which has been recently built, running largely between the Meyzieu ZI and the Lyon-Saint Exupery stations.

There are four stations along the line:

- Part-Dieu (Metro Line B)
- Vaulx-en-Velin (Metro Line A)
- Meyzieu Z.I.
- Lyon-Saint Exupéry Airport

Of these four stations, Vaulx-en-Velin and Meyzieu ZI are intermediate stations. All stations have been designed with accessibility in mind, either being directly accessible from the ground level or via provided elevators. Further accessibility measures included the presence of braille signage indicating levels and locations. The information terminals that provide live train schedules include periodic audio announcements for passenger convenience.

== Rolling stock ==
The six Tango 12 tram-train sets were built by Stadler Rail at its factory in Wilhelmsruh, Berlin. Rolling stock was chosen after a tender, taking into account the technical criteria (speed up to 100 km/h [62 mph]), durability, security and compatibility with the common use of the T3 line infrastructure, economics (capacity adapted to the traffic and prospects for their development) as well as comfort and aesthetics. The interior and exterior designs of the Stadler Tango were created by RCP Design Global, who had already designed the tramways in Le Mans, Angers and Paris. All doors are automatically operated, and are designed to readily allow the movement of wheelchairs and pushchairs. Each tram-train is provisioned with two dedicated areas that provide greater stability for wheelchair users during travel; in addition to grab bars, seat belts are also provided for the purpose of restraining the chair.

== See also ==
- Lyon tramway
- Lyon metro
- Trams in France
