= Trams in France =

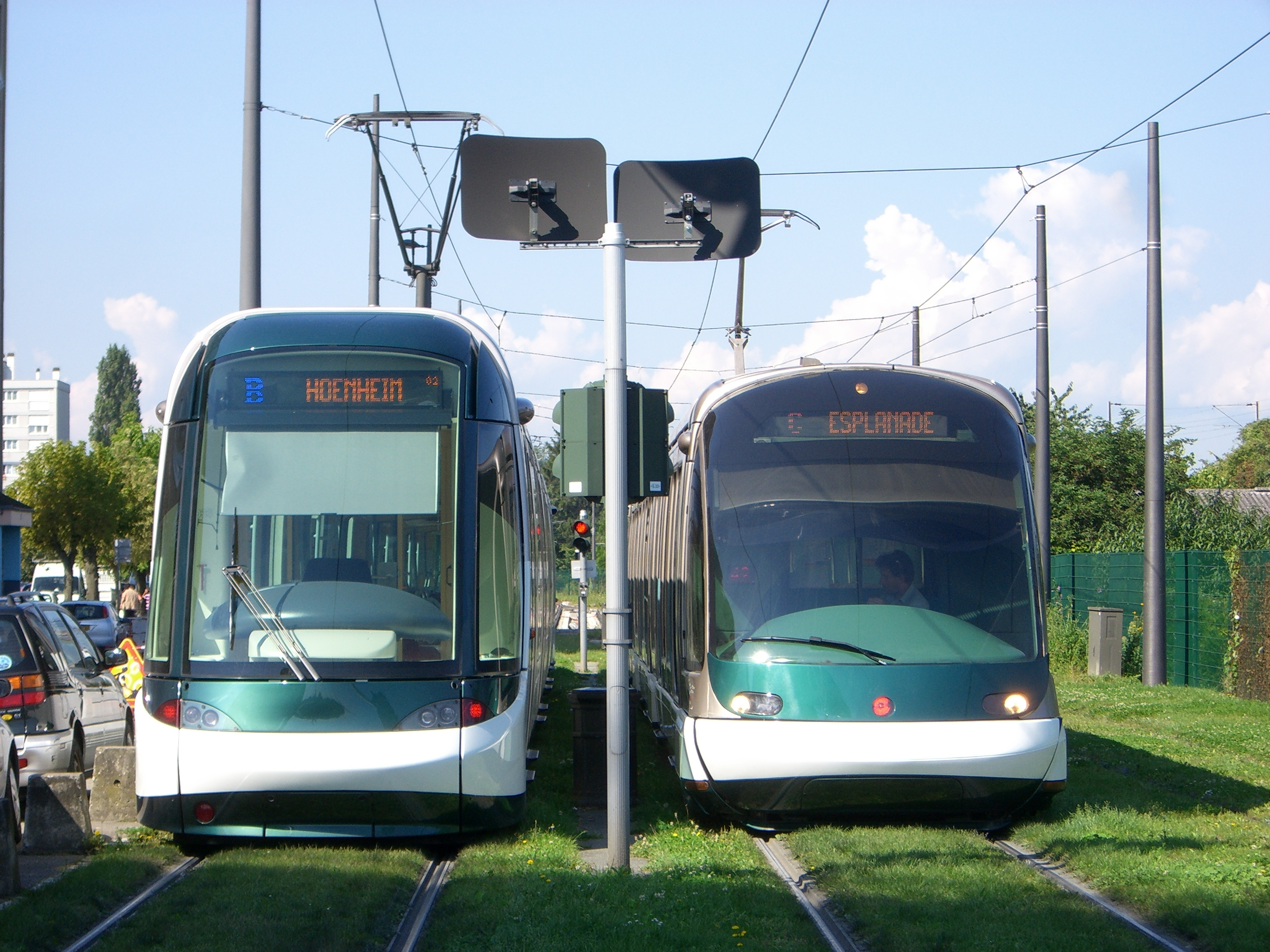
Alstom Citadis (left) and Eurotram (right) cars in Strasbourg

Trams in France date from 1837 when a 15 km steam tram line connected Montrond-les-Bains and Montbrison in the Loire. With the development of electric trams at the end of the 19th century, networks proliferated in French cities over a period of 15 years. Although nearly all of the country's tram systems were replaced by bus services in the 1930s or shortly after the Second World War, France is now in the forefront of the revival of tramways and light rail systems around the globe. Only tram lines in Lille and Saint-Étienne have operated continuously since the 19th century; the Marseille tramway system ran continuously until 2004 and only closed then for 3 years (until 2007) for extensive refurbishment into a modern tram network. Since the opening of the Nantes tramway in 1985, more than twenty towns and cities across France have built new tram lines. As of 2024, there are 28 operational tram networks in France, with 3 more planned. France is also home to Alstom, a leading tram manufacturer. One French tram system, the Strasbourg tramway, crosses an international border into Kehl, Germany. Furthermore two Swiss systems, namely the Basel tramway and the Geneva tramway, cross into France. As of 2026 those are the only tram systems in the world to cross an international border.

== History ==
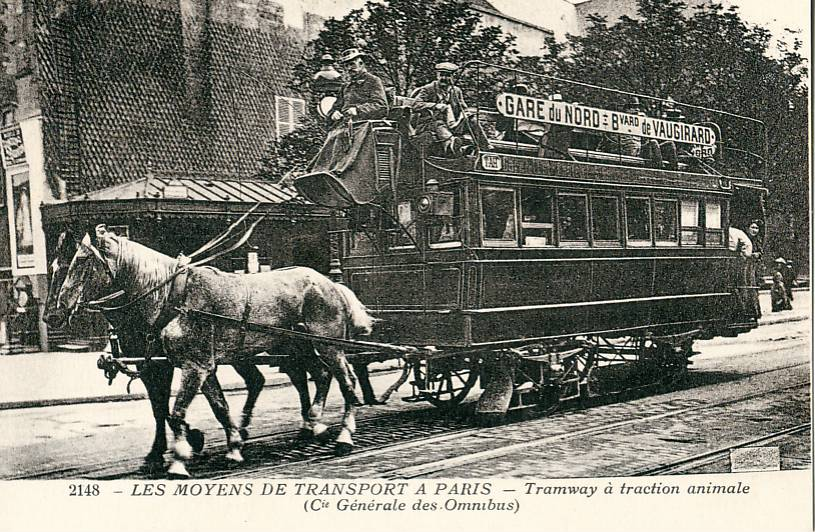
An old horse tram in Paris

=== The girder rail ===
One of the key inventions in the world history of trams was that of the girder rail developed in 1852 by Frenchman Alphonse Loubat. It brought the tram track down to road level, avoiding accidents with pedestrians and other vehicles caused by the standard protruding rail used until then. Inspired by John Stephenson of New York City, it was in Paris that Loubat built the first line of this type, for horse trams, which was inaugurated on 21 November 1853 in connection with the 1855 World Fair. On a trial basis, it ran along the banks of the Seine from the Place de la Concorde to the Pont de Sèvres in the village of Boulogne.

=== Horse trams ===
Several French cities were equipped with horse-tram networks towards the end of the 19th century. In Paris, Tramways Sud operated horse trams from 1875 to 1901. In Marseille, horse trams operated by Compagnie Générale Française de Tramways entered service in 1876 on a number of routes including the Canebière. In Strasbourg, horse tram services began in 1877.

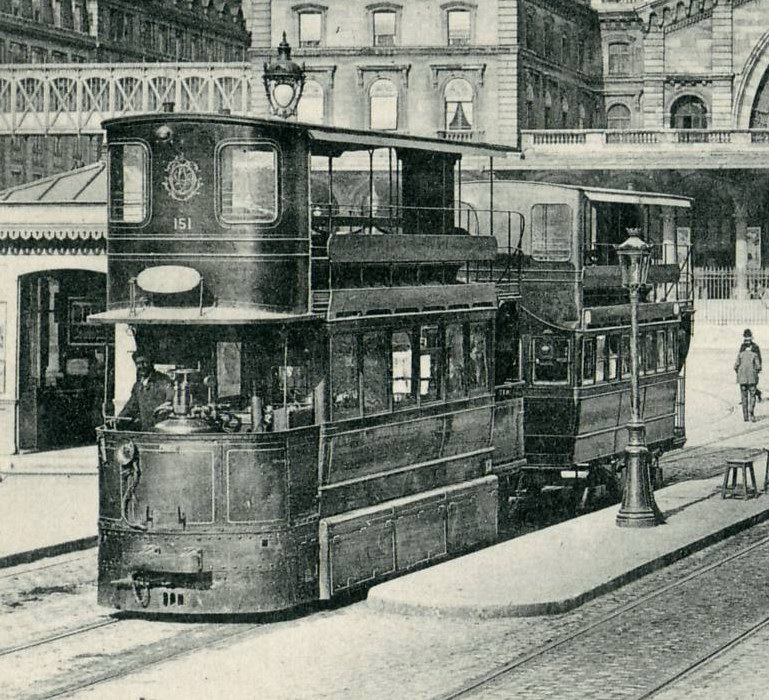
Mékarski compressed-air tram in Paris

=== Mechanical traction ===
As horse trams presented a number of disadvantages (need for several teams of horses per vehicle per day, relatively slow speed, droppings on the roadway), it was not long before various mechanical traction systems came into use. These included:

- Compressed-air systems, first introduced in Nantes in 1879 with Mékarski compressed-air cars operating between Doulon and the Gare Maritime. Initially there was a fleet of 22 trams, two locomotives and four open-topped double-deck trailers. The first line was just over 6 km long, built to standard gauge and was mostly level, running along the quays of the Loire. Mekarski trams were also operated in Paris (1887), Vichy (1895), Aix-les-Bains (1897), Saint-Quentin (1899), and La Rochelle (1901).
- Steam traction was introduced fairly widely in the 1880s and 1890s, in most cases for relatively short periods as electric trams were soon to follow. For example, the Versailles Tramway started using steam trams for the stretch to Saint-Cyr in 1889 before electrification in 1895. In Strasbourg, there were steam trams from 1879 to 1899 although electrification began in 1895. Marseille's steam trams came in 1892, shortly before their electric counterparts in 1900.

=== Electrification ===
Although Werner von Siemens demonstrated the electric tram in 1881 at the International Electrical Exhibition in Paris, it was not until 1890 that the first électric tram was opened in Clermont-Ferrand, and in 1895 the Tramway de Versailles was converted from steam power to electric power. While electricity offered considerable benefits including ease of operation, many municipalities were reluctant to bring overhead cabling into their city centres. Nevertheless, over the next 15 years, well over 100 standard and small gauge electric tram networks came into operation.

=== Post-war closures ===
Most of France's tram systems closed during the 1930s or in the post-war years. The only systems which have remained in continuous use are those in Lille, Marseille and Saint-Étienne but even these were extensively reduced in size before the recent revival.

== Today's tram networks ==
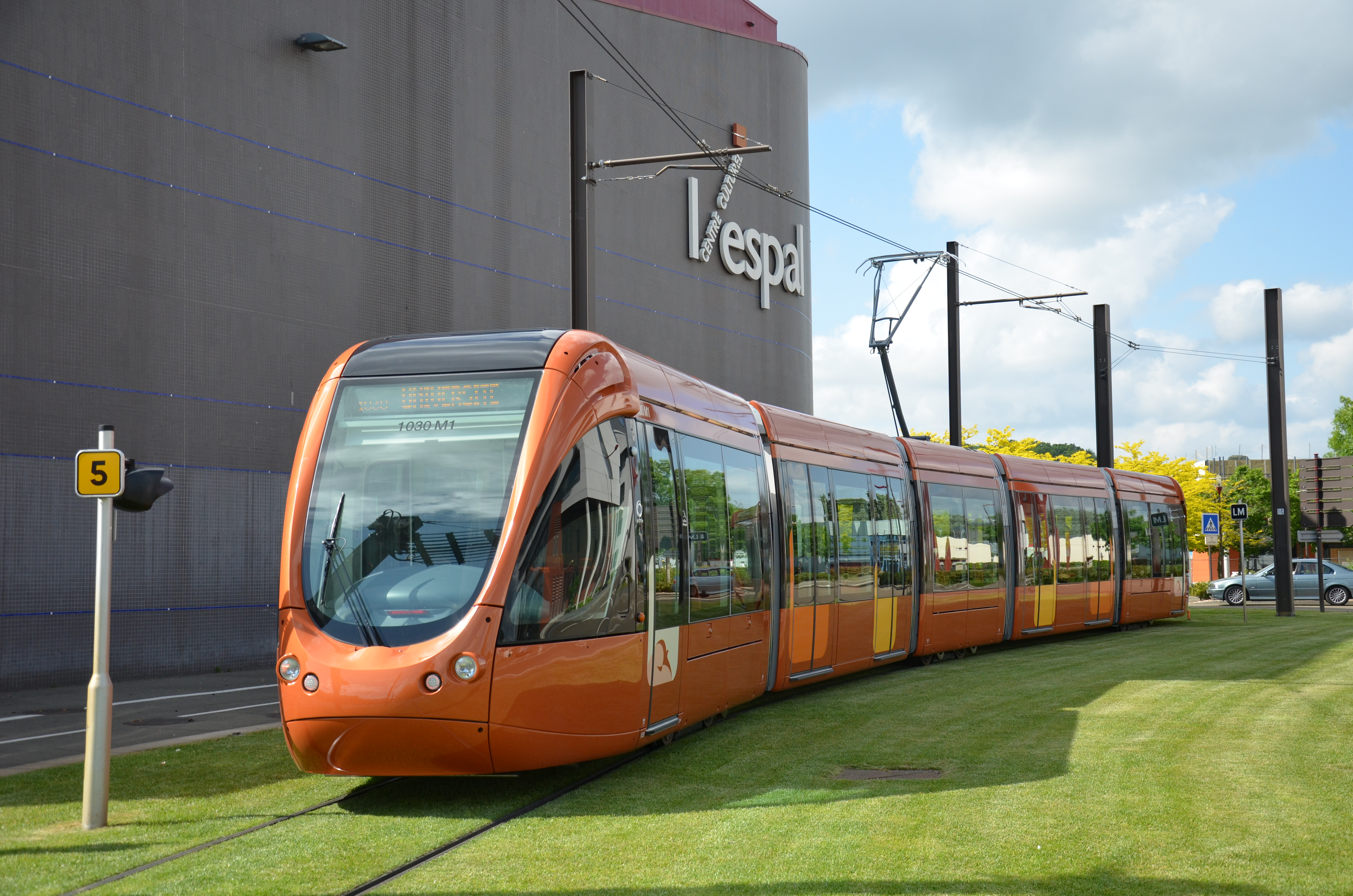
The Citadis 302, seen here in Le Mans

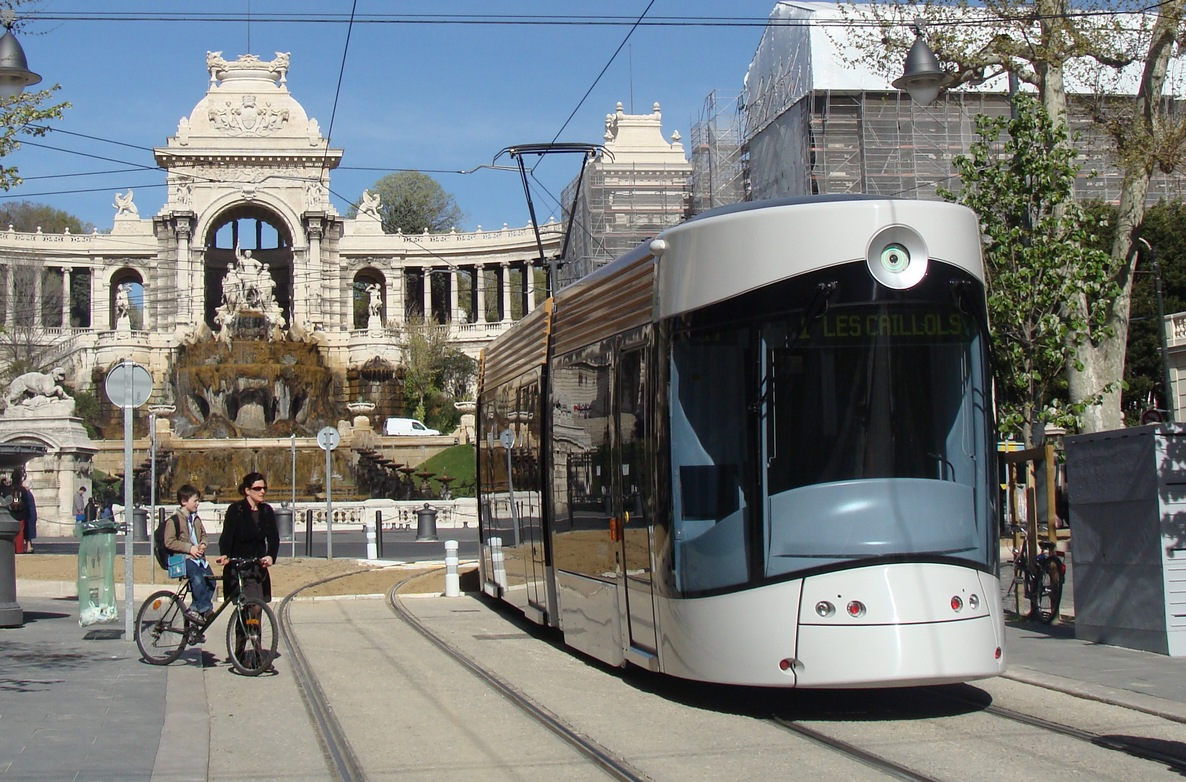
A Flexity Outlook tram in Marseille

Over the past 35 years, a rapidly growing number of France's cities have developed modern tramways or light rail networks. In 2020, there are 27 modern tram systems spread right across the country (excluding the two trams-on-tyres services). Many of these are being extended while at least seven other municipalities are in the process of planning or acquiring new tram networks.

=== Rolling stock ===
- The most popular rolling stock is the Alstom Citadis tram from Alstom, designed by RCP Design Global agency. This model serves 10 of the current networks. In many cases, the vehicles have been restyled or customised: for example the transport authority for the Nice area required special external styling, greater passenger accessibility and battery support for travelling though the city centre without the need for overhead cables.
- Alstom also produced the earlier Tramway Français Standard or TFS which continues to run in five networks including Grenoble and Nantes where it has been specially adapted to provide accessibility.
- The Canadian manufacturer Bombardier has delivered a variant of its Flexity Outlook series to Marseille with special styling from MBD Design giving the front of the tram the appearance of the bow of a ship. The Eurotram, initially developed by Socimi of Italy. It is used in the extensive Strasbourg tram network with innovations including a powered wheelchair ramp, wide internal gangways and provision for wheelchairs and pushchairs.
- The trams for the revamped Lille network were supplied in the early 1990s by the Italian company Breda with styling by Pininfarina. The Paris region recently opted for Avanto rolling stock on its tram-train line from Aulnay-sous-Bois to Bondy.

=== Interesting details ===
- The most extensive tram systems in France today are those in Lyon (6 lines, 78 km), Paris/Île-de-France (9 lines, 104.7 km), Montpellier (4 lines, 60 km), Strasbourg (6 lines, 55 km), Nantes (3 lines, 44 km) and Bordeaux (6 lines, 66 km).
- Most modern trams are designed to travel at up to 80 km per hour while tram-trains may have a top speed of 100 km per hour.
- While most cities discontinued the use of trams in favour of buses in the middle of the last century, a few of the original lines have survived without interruption. These include the 3 km line through the tunnel at the centre of Marseille, the two lines in Lille which go back to 1909 and the line in Saint-Étienne which has been operating ever since 1881.

=== Electrification and tyre trams ===
There has also been a strong emphasis on tramway innovations such as ground-level power supply in Bordeaux and trams on tyres in Nancy. The French government reports no electrocutions or electrification accidents on any tramway in France from as early as 2003 until as recently as December 31, 2020.

== Current tramway systems ==
The following French towns and cities now have light rail or tram systems:

Town/City	Region	Tramway article	First Opened	Closed	Reopened	Notes
Angers	Pays de la Loire	Angers tramway	1896	1949	2011	
Aubagne	Provence-Alpes-Côte d'Azur	Aubagne tramway	2014			
Avignon	Provence-Alpes-Côte d'Azur	Avignon tramway	1899	1932	2019	
Besançon	Bourgogne-Franche-Comté	Trams in Besançon	1897	1952	2014	
Bordeaux	Nouvelle-Aquitaine	Bordeaux Tramway	1880	1958	2003	
Brest	Brittany	Brest Tramway	1898	1945	2012	
Caen	Normandy	Caen tramway	1901	1937	2019	2002-2017 'trams on tyres'
Clermont-Ferrand	Auvergne-Rhône-Alpes	Clermont-Ferrand tramway	1890	1956	2006	'trams on tyres'
Dijon	Bourgogne-Franche-Comté	Dijon Tramway	1895	1961	2012	
Grenoble	Auvergne-Rhône-Alpes	Grenoble tramway	1897	1952	1987	
Le Havre	Normandy	Le Havre tramway	1894	1951	2012	
Le Mans	Pays de la Loire	Le Mans tramway	1897	1947	2007	
Lille	Hauts-de-France	Lille tramway	1874			open non-stop
Lyon	Auvergne-Rhône-Alpes	Lyon tramway	1897	1956	2001	
Marseille	Provence-Alpes-Côte d'Azur	Marseille tramway	1876	2004	2007	Between 2004 and 2007 closed for reconstruction.
Montpellier	Occitanie	Montpellier tramway	1898	1949	2000	
Mulhouse	Grand Est	Mulhouse tramway	1892	1956	2006	
Nantes	Pays de la Loire	Nantes Tramway	1879	1958	1985	
Nice	Provence-Alpes-Côte d'Azur	Nice tramway	1878	1953	2007	
Orléans	Centre-Val de Loire	Orléans tramway	1899	1938	2000	
In and around Paris	Île-de-France	Tramways in Île-de-France	1885	1938	1992	
Reims	Grand Est	Reims tramway	1900	1949	2011	
Rouen	Normandy	Rouen tramway	1896	1953	1994	
Saint-Étienne	Auvergne-Rhône-Alpes	Saint-Étienne tramway	1881			open non-stop
Strasbourg	Grand Est	Strasbourg tramway	1878	1960	1994	
Toulouse	Occitanie	Toulouse tramway	1887	1957	2010	
Tours	Centre-Val de Loire	Tours tramway	1900	1949	2013	
Valenciennes	Hauts-de-France	Valenciennes tramway	1881	1966	2006	

In addition to the above French tram systems, three tramways cross the border into France from neighbouring countries, although in all three cases the proportion of the system in France is quite small:

- Baselland Transport route 10 connects Leymen in Alsace with Basel in Switzerland - since 1910
- The Saarbahn connects Sarreguemines with Saarbrücken in Germany
- The Transports publics genevois of Geneva operates tram line 17 to Annemasse. Further lines are planned to cross the Franco-Swiss border.

== Future lines ==
One line is planned to open in Annecy. Plans of converting the Nancy Guided Light Transit into a proper tramway, as in Caen, were abandoned in 2021 following a change in the municipal council. Tramway plans have closed in 2023 in favour of a busway (BHNS/BRT) and a bi-articulated guided battery supported trolleybus.

== Recent technical developments ==
The revival of tram networks in France has brought about a number of technical developments both in the traction systems and in the styling of the vehicles.

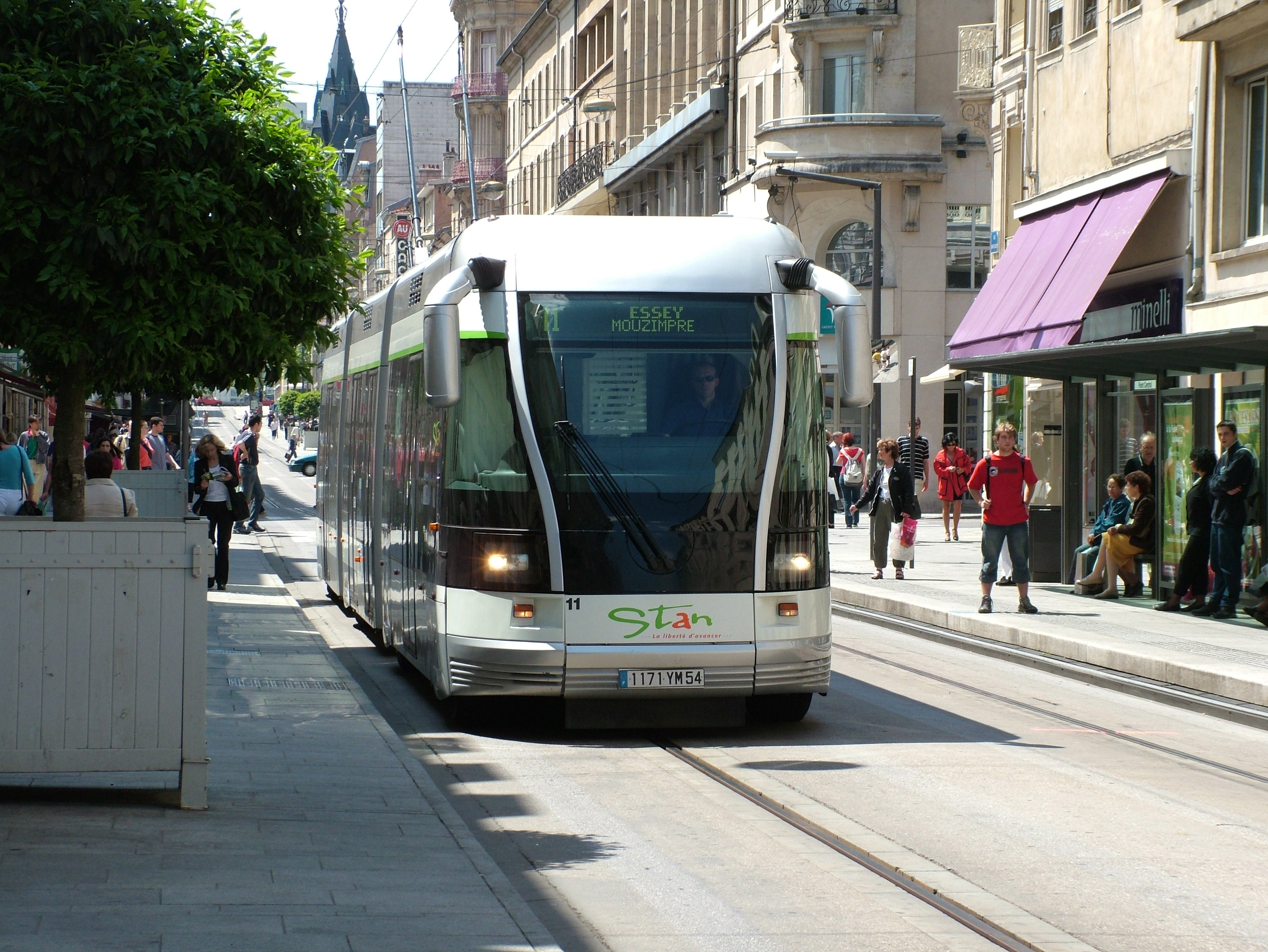
Bombardier GLT in Nancy

=== Trams on tyres ===
Left: the Translohr guide rail (green) and the tram's guide wheels (red). Right: a guide rail and guide wheel of Bombardier's GLT

A recent development of tramway technology has been the guided bus (or tram on tyres), a rubber-tyred vehicle guided by a fixed rail in the ground, which draws current from overhead electric wires like a conventional tram.

Two incompatible systems exist:

- The Guided Light Transit designed by Bombardier Transportation which was adopted in Nancy and Caen. Here a double flanged wheel between the rubber tyres followed the guidance rail. Both of these systems have closed, that in Nancy – which used double overhead wires and trolley pole current collection had been converted from a conventional trolleybus line – being converted back to trolleybuses and that in Caen being converted to a conventional tramway.
- The Translohr system, used along a 14-km line at Clermont-Ferrand, where a special rail is grasped by a pair of metal guide wheels set at 45° to the road and at 90° to each other.

In both cases the weight of the vehicle is borne by rubber tyres on bogies to which the guide wheels are attached. Power is supplied by overhead lines, or on the Caen tramway until 31 December 2017 (when it was closed to be converted to a conventional steel-wheel tramway now in operation since 27 July 2019), and the Nancy tramway by onboard diesel engines in areas where there were no overhead wires.

The Translohr system is intended for guidance-only operation, whereas the Bombardier system can be driven as a normal bus as requirements dictate, such as journeys to the depot. Unlike rail trams, the vehicles have a steering wheel, though it is not used when following the guidance rail. Because the Translohr tram cannot move without guidance, it is not classified as a bus. Hence the Translohr vehicles in Clermont-Ferrand are not equipped with licence plates.

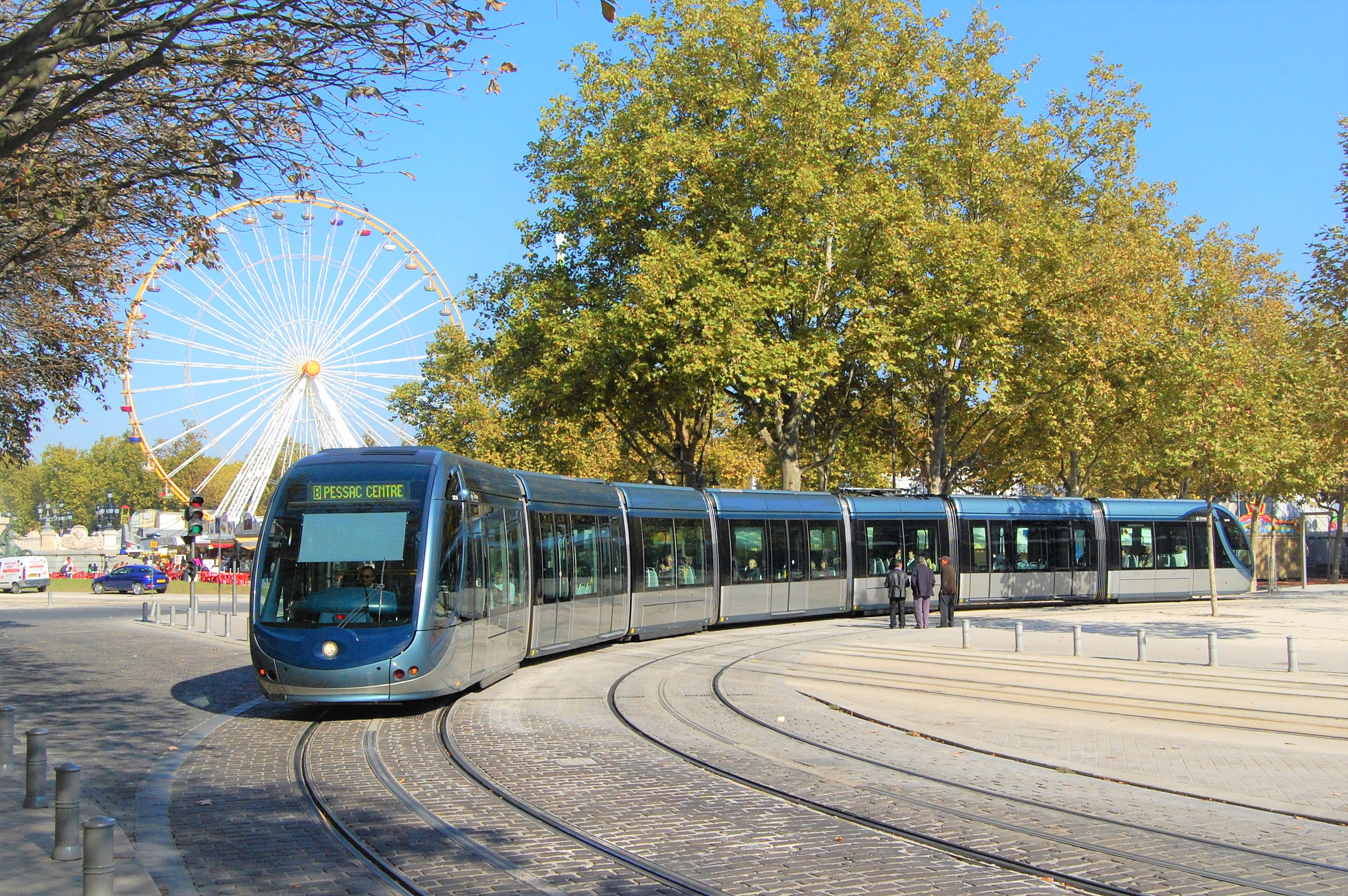
A section of APS track in Bordeaux with powered and neutral sections

=== APS third rail ===
The ground-level power supply system known as APS or Alimentation par le sol uses a third rail placed between the running rails, divided electrically into eight-metre segments with three-metre neutral sections in between. Each tram has two power collection skates, next to which are antennas that send radio signals to energise the power rail segments as the tram passes over them. At any one time, no more than two consecutive segments under the tram should actually be live. Alstrom developed the system primarily to avoid intrusive power supply cables in the sensitive area of the old city of Bordeaux.

=== Modern styling ===
The Eurotram used in Strasbourg, Milan and Porto was developed by Socimi of Italy. The Eurotram has a modern design that makes it look almost as much like a train as a tram, and has large windows along its entire length.

=== Modular design ===
The Alstom Citadis tram, flagship of the French manufacturer Alstom, enjoys an innovative design combining lighter bogies with a modular concept for carriages offering more choices in the types of windows and the number of cars and doors. The recent Citadis-Dualis, intended to run at up to 100 km/h, is suitable for stop spacings ranging from 500 m to 5 km. Dualis is a strictly modular partial low-floor car, with all doors in the low-floor sections.

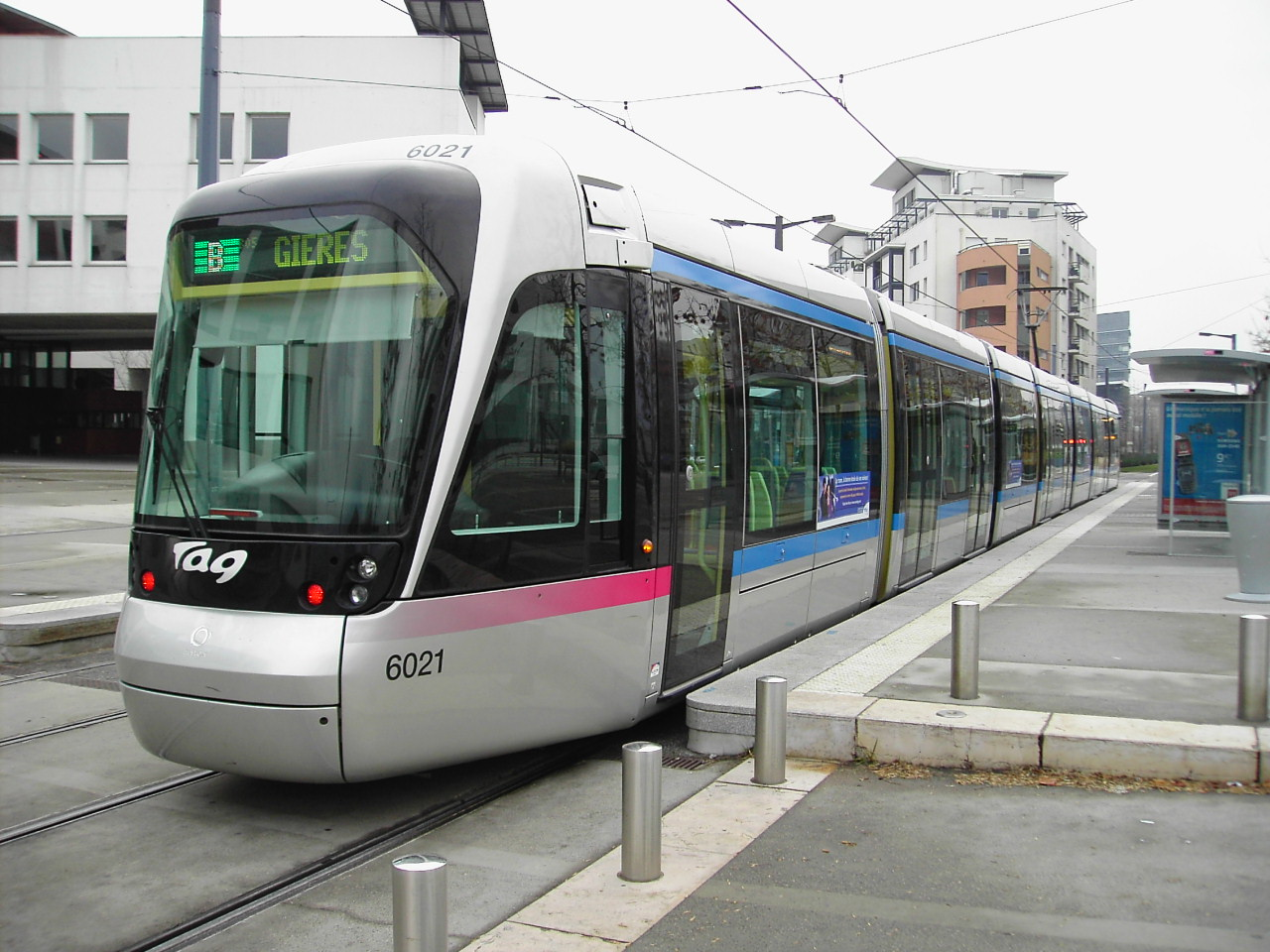
A Citadis tram in Grenoble

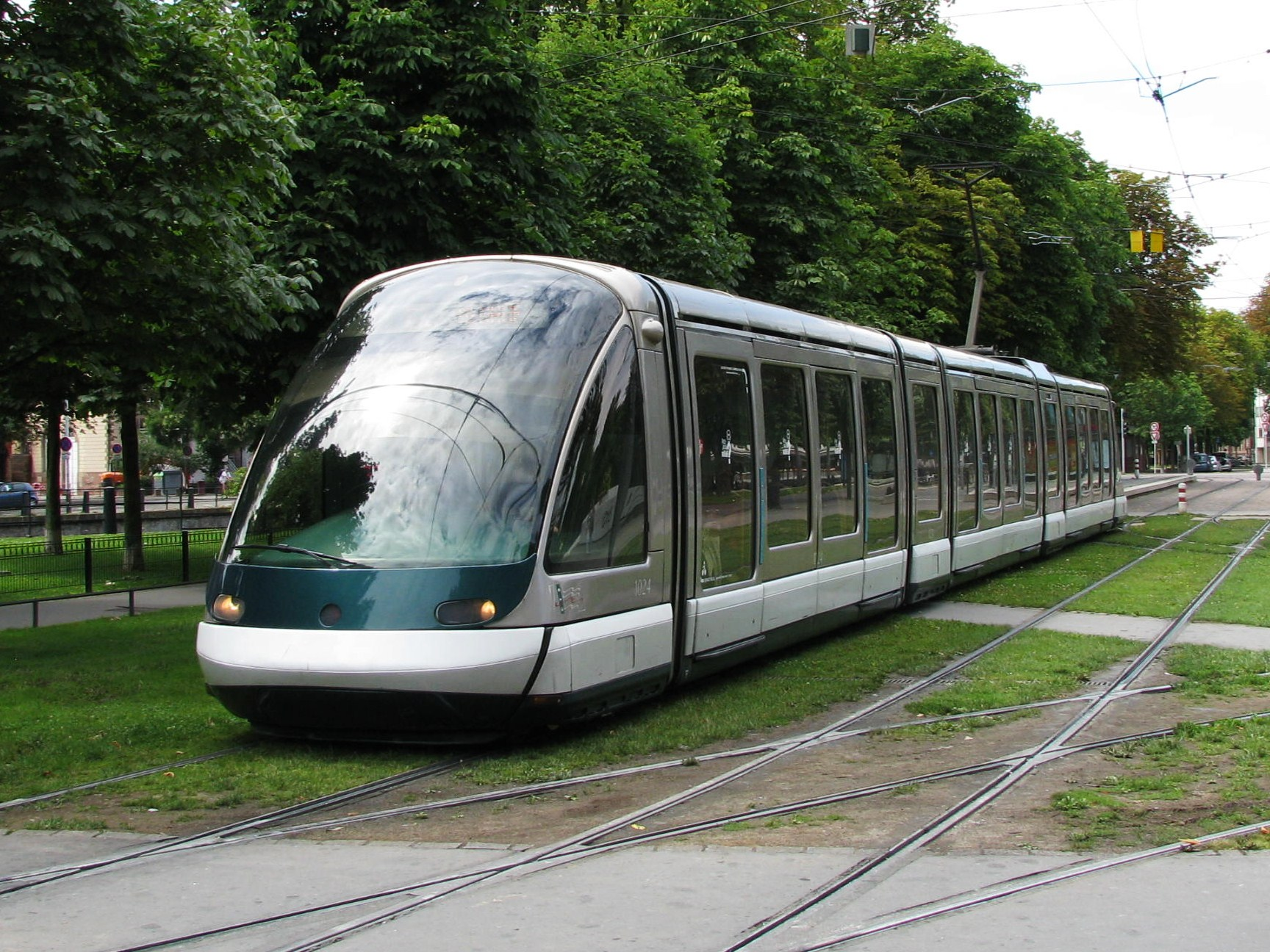
Eurotram in Strasbourg

== Tramway museum lines ==
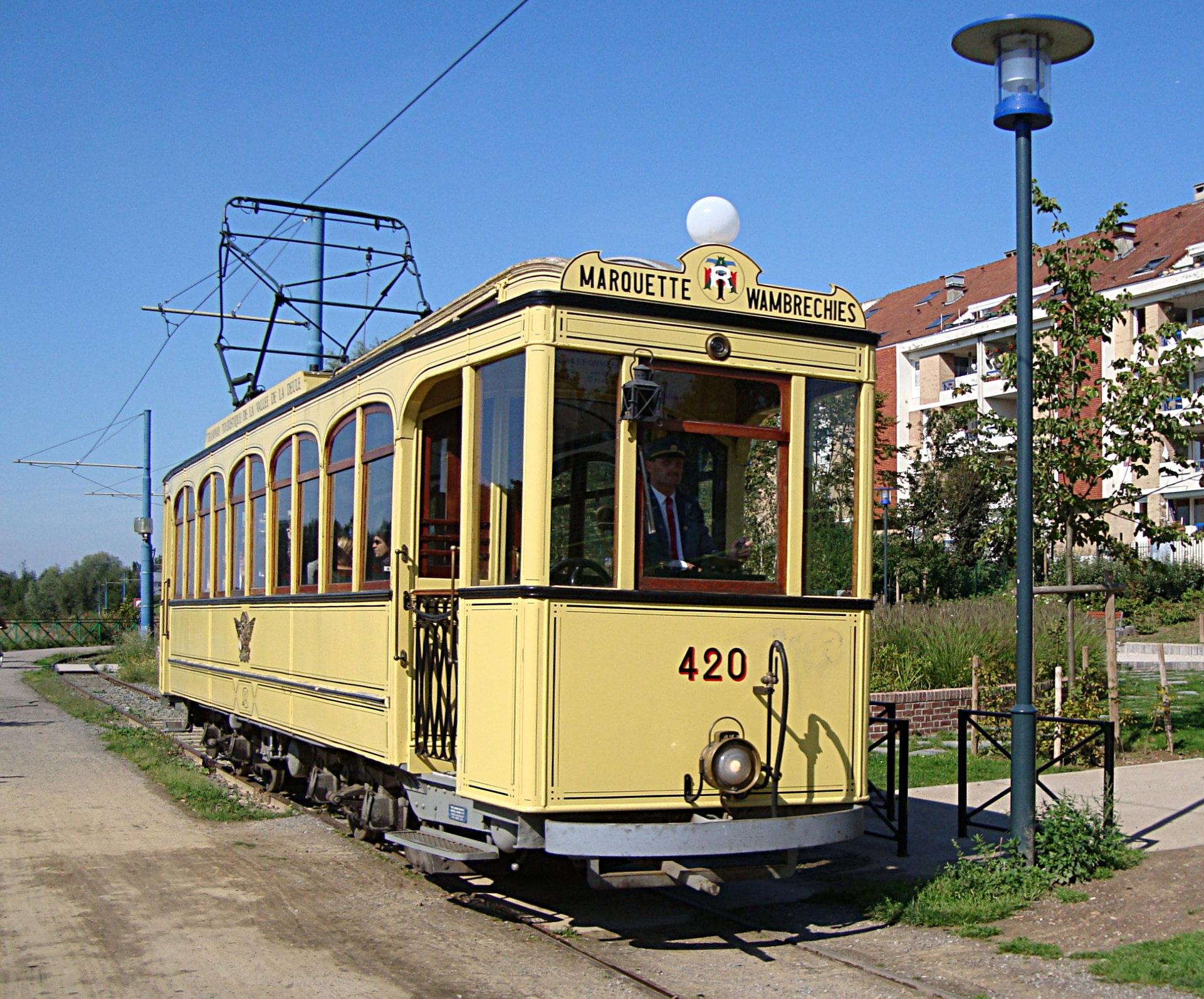
Deûle Valley tourist tram

In addition to recent developments in France's urban areas, the Deûle Valley tram museum line operates near Lille. It runs along a 3 km track from Marquette-lez-Lille to Wambrechies and features several tram vehicles dating back to the beginning of the 20th century.

== See also ==
- Trams in Europe
- List of town tramway systems in France
- Rail transport in France
