= RCP Design Global =

French design agency

- Type: Private
- Industry: Design/Tram/Train
- Founded: 1986
- Headquarters: Tours
- Key people: Régine Charvet-Pello
- Products: SNCF, Alstom, RATP, Stadler Rail, château de Chenonceau, Vergnet, Paris Olympia
- Number of employees: 15
- Website: www.rcp.fr

RCP Design Global or RCP is an independent design agency based in Tours and Paris (France) founded by Régine Charvet-Pello in 1986. RCP is predominantly based in the transport and mobility design, and specialises in urban transport, High-speed rail, interiors, public spaces and street furniture. RCP is the French leader on sensory design.

== History ==
RCP Design Global was founded in 1986.

1996 :

- Design Transport :Transilien for the SNCF – extern design
- Main contract with the RATP

2002 :

- Design of the Paris Tramway Line 3 for Alstom transport

2003 :

- PREDIT Program with the SNCF – Direction de l’Innovation et de la Recherche
- Became the advertising agency of the château de Chenonceau

2004 :

- Le Mans tramway design
- Fondation of Sensolab, sensory design department.

2006 :

- Le Mans buses Design
- Angers tramway design

2007 :

- Design in Algeria of Algiers tramway, Oran Tramway and Constantine Tramway for Alstom
- Design of the tram-train express line Rhônexpress (Lyon/Lyon-Saint Exupéry Airport) with Veolia Transport and Stadler Rail

2009 :

- Tramway of Tours Design in association with Roger Tallon and Daniel Buren
- Wind turbine Design for Vergnet

2010 :

- Tours buses Design
- Renovation of the SNCF TGV Sud-Est; in association with Compin
- Seat concept for TGV – SNCF

2011 :

- SUDI Design, Photovoltaics station with Groupe Hervé and Raphaël Dinelli
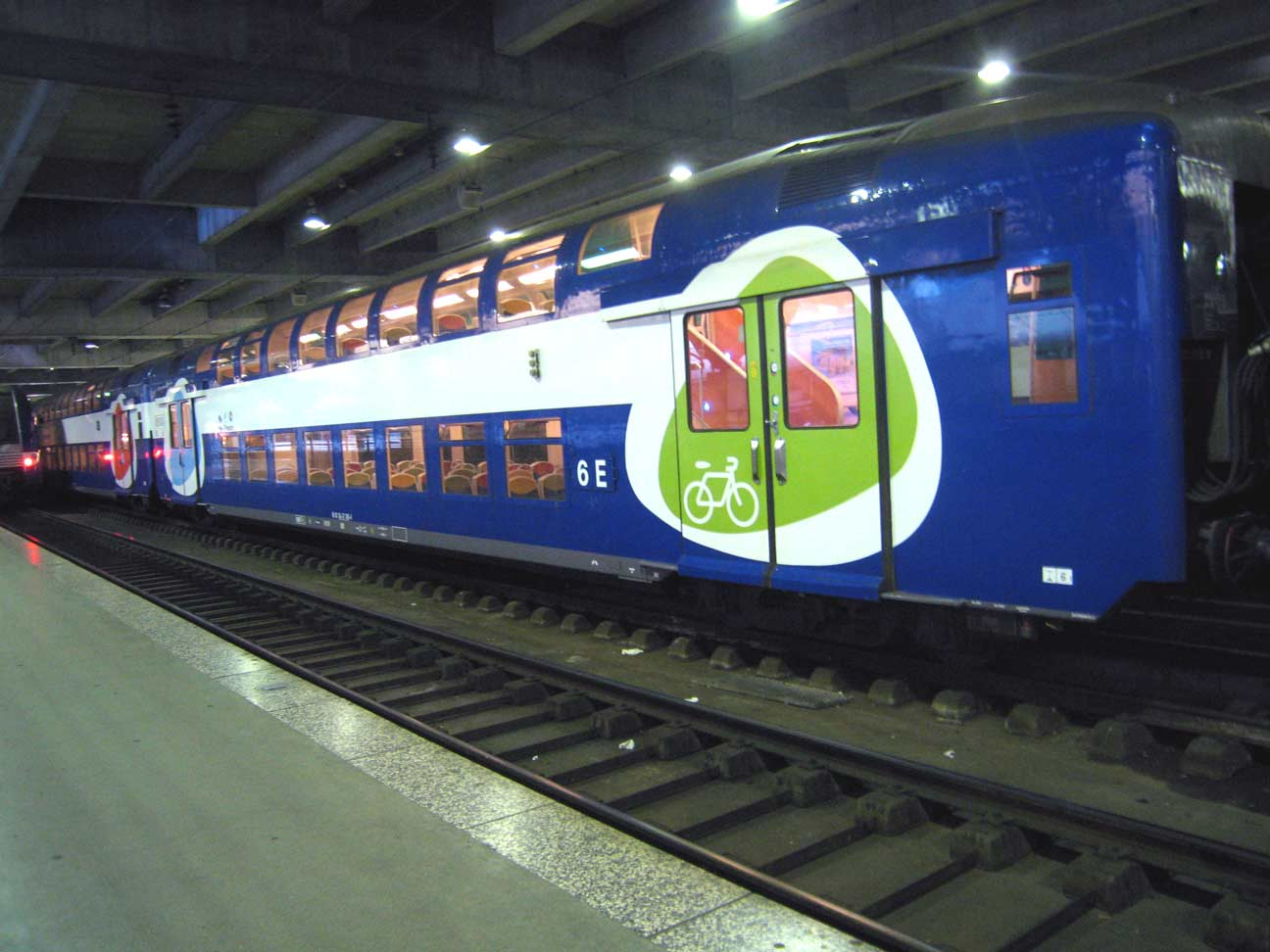
Transilien in Paris

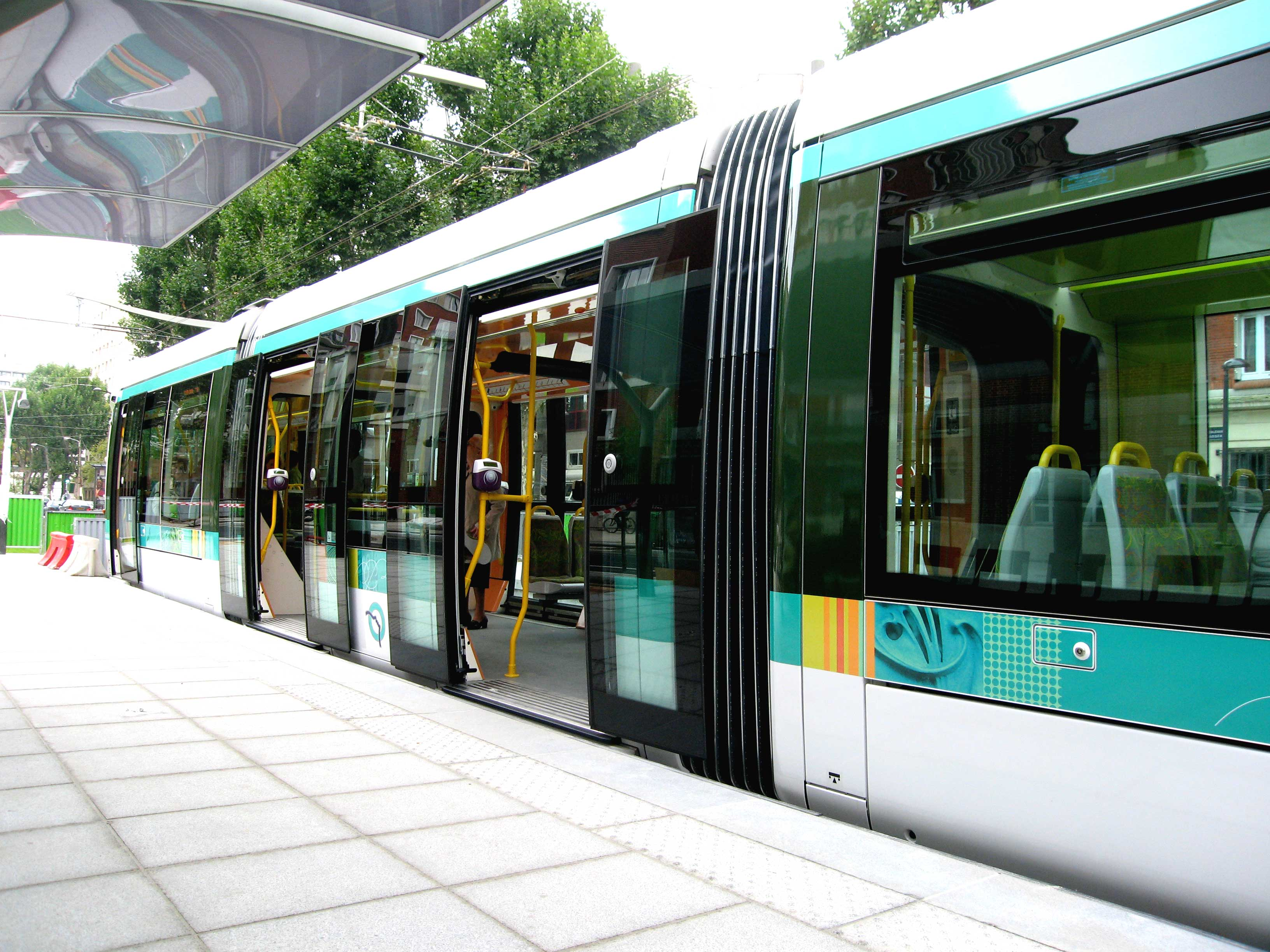
Paris Tramway

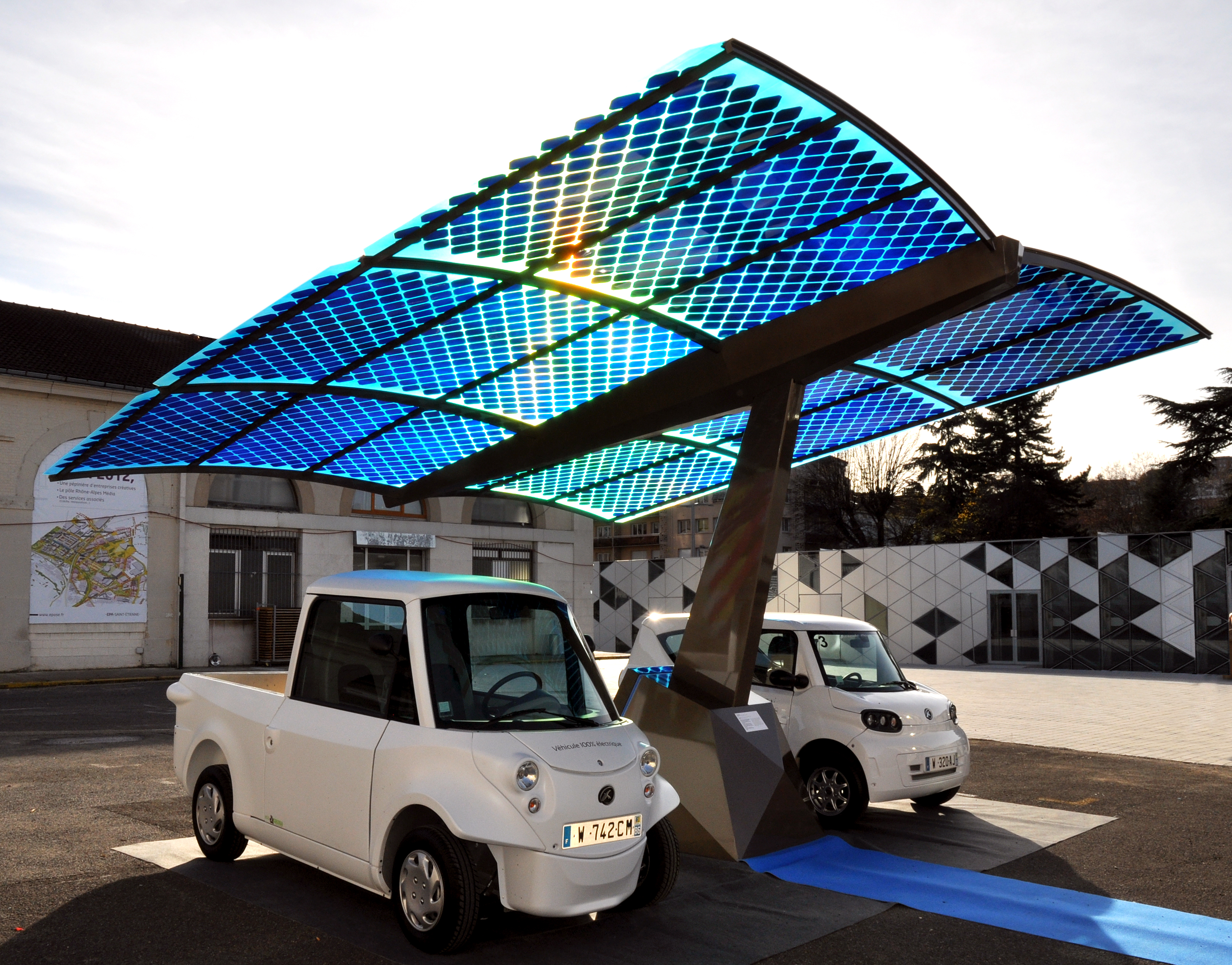
Photovoltaics station SUDI

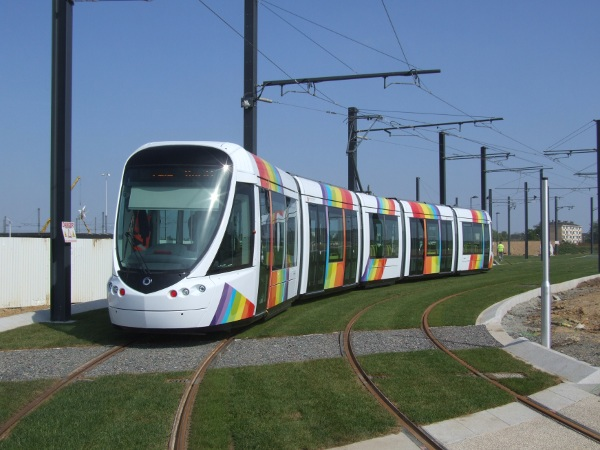
Angers tramway

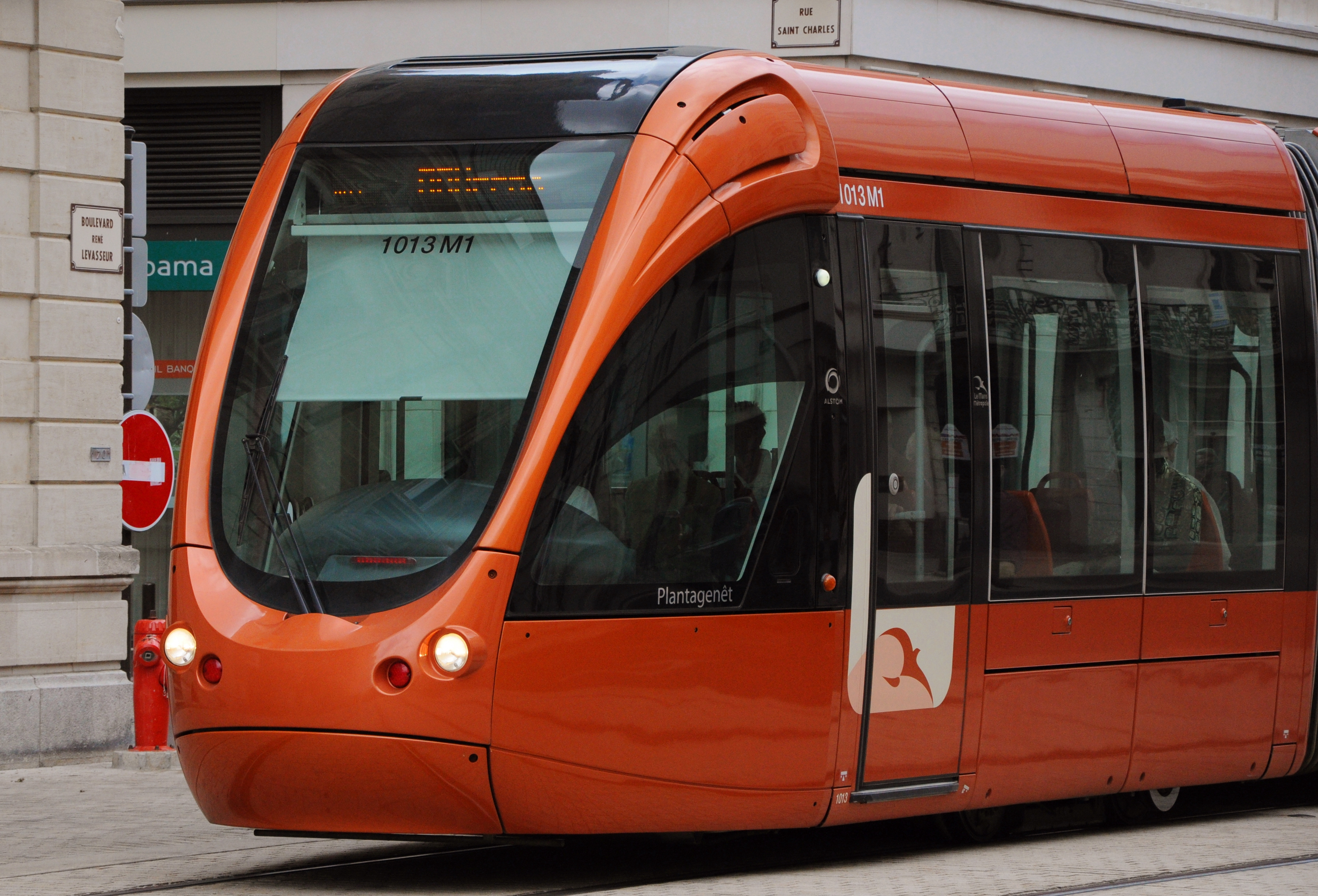
Le Mans tramway

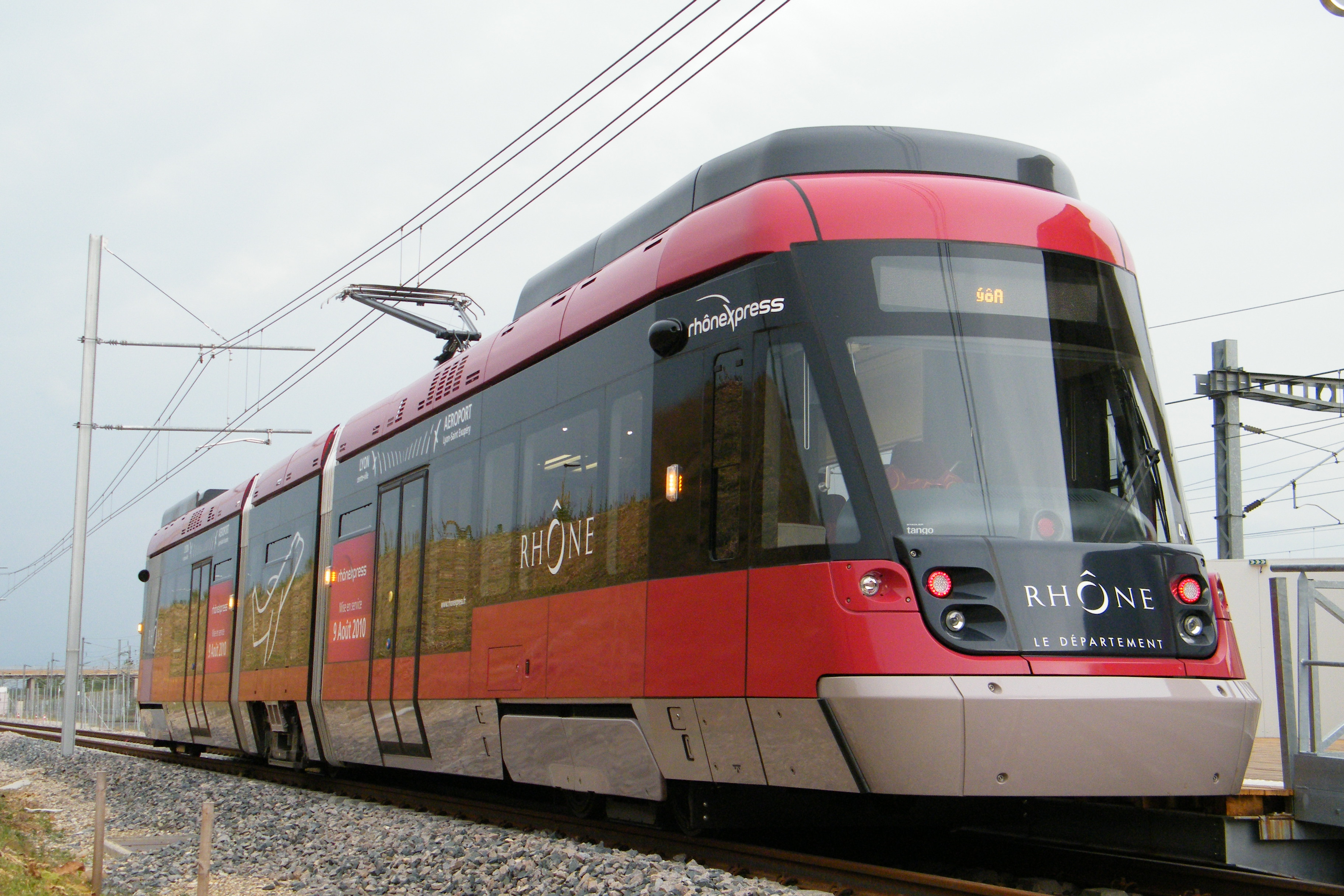
Rhônexpress in Lyon

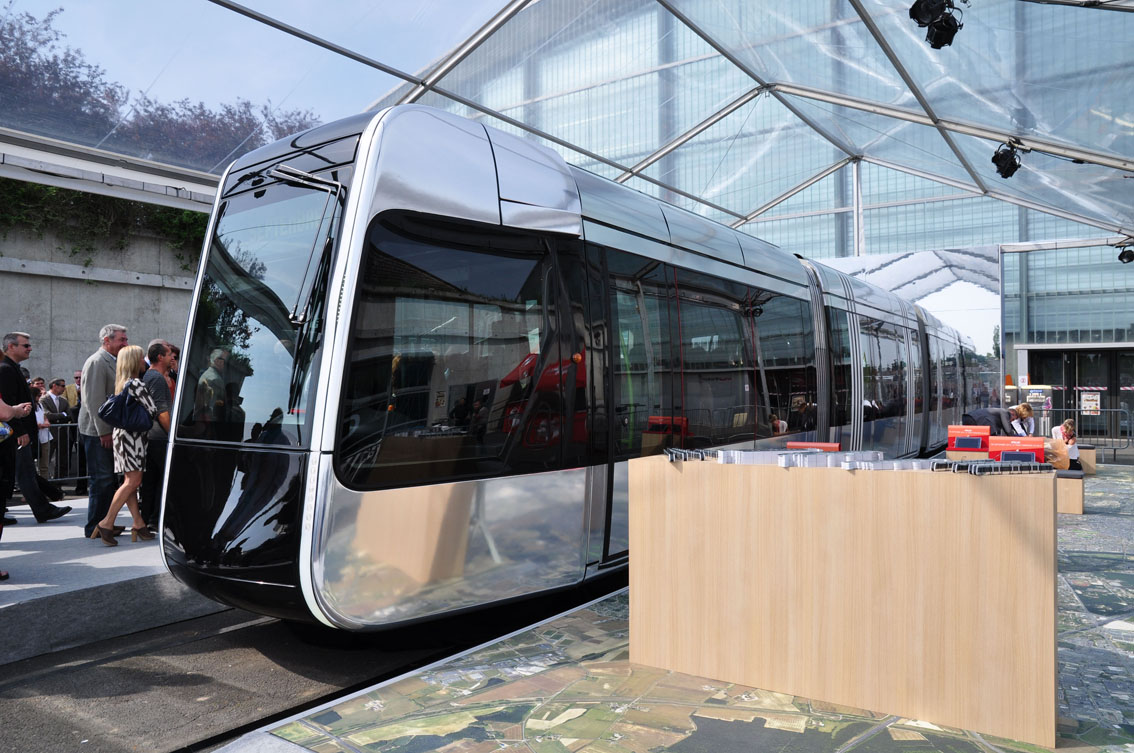
Tours Tramway

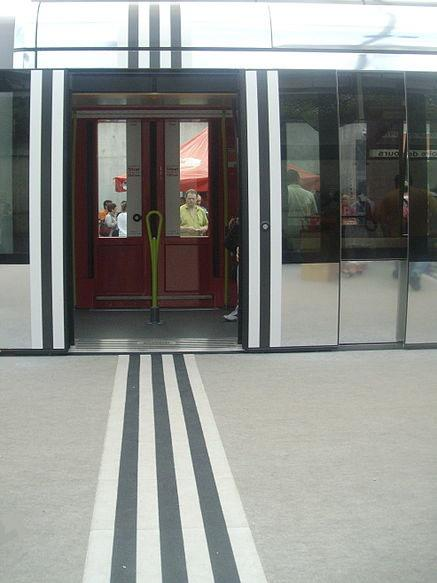
Tours Tramway – The vertical stripes Daniel Buren

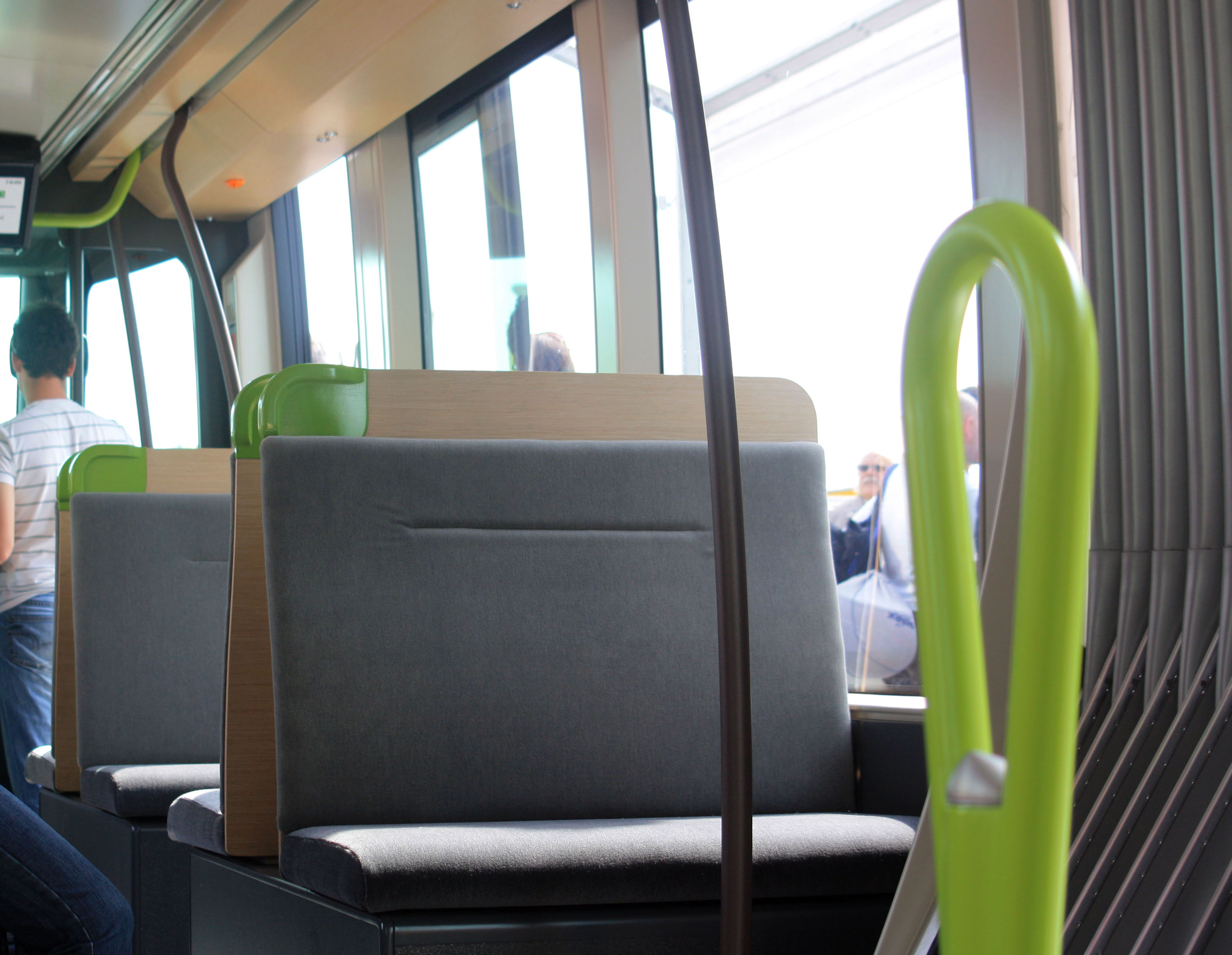
Inside view – seat; Design by RCP Design Global

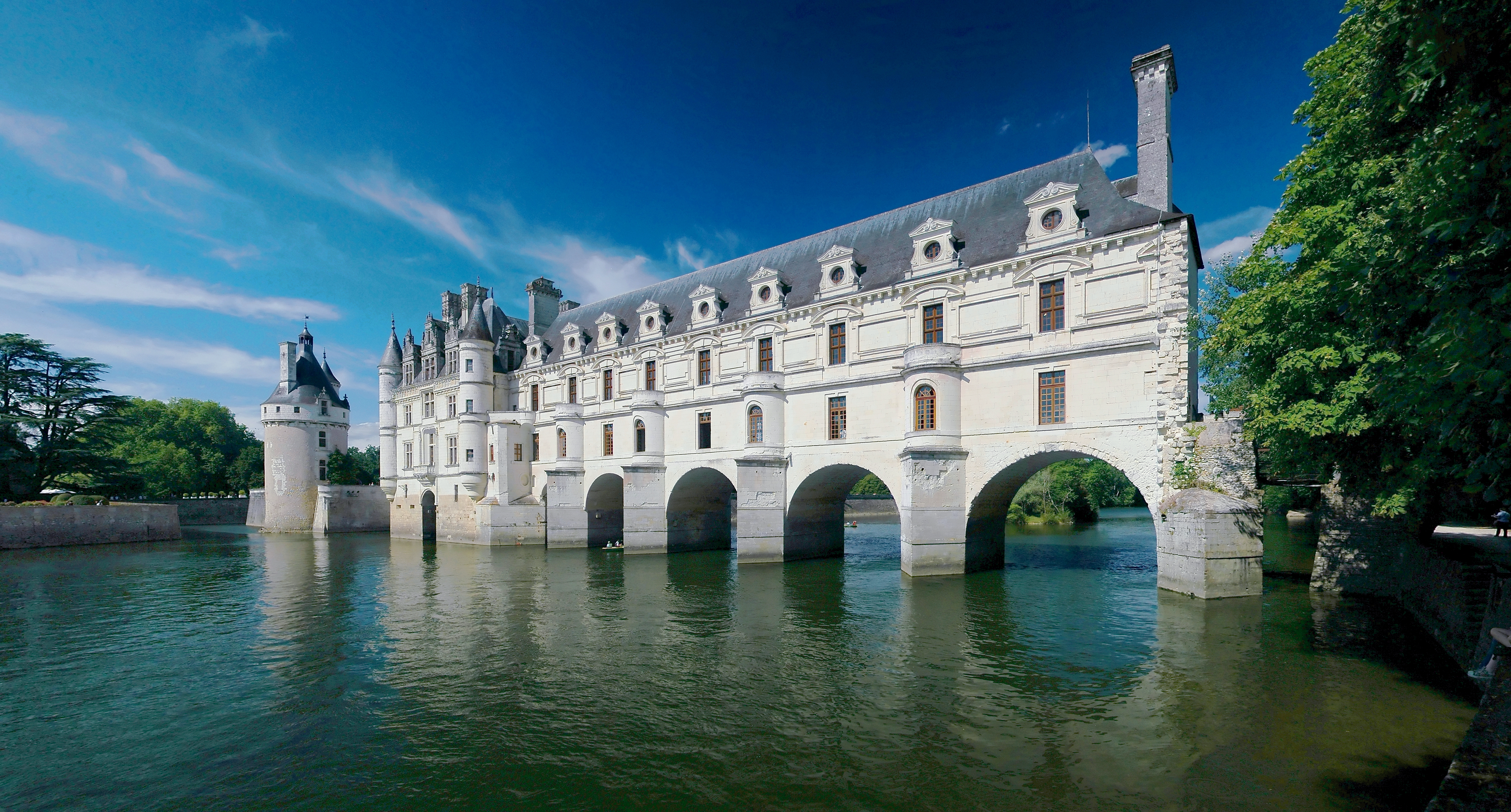
Panorama of Château de Chenonceau, Indre-et-Loire, France

== Awards ==
RCP is most notable for the number of national and international design awards they have won over the years.

- 2001: Étoiles de l'Observeur du design 01 (see French Wikipedia article): "Jeux d'extérieur Gyrosat" – Proludic
- 2004: Lauréat Observeur du design 04: "Jouet Manipuloo" – Nathan
- 2006: Lauréat Observeur du design 06: "Tramway des Maréchaux à Paris" – RATP
- 2006: Lauréat Observeur du design 06: "CYCLOTRI, borne interactive de la mallette pédagogique" – Haute-Garonne general council
- 2007: Grand Prix Cap’ Com / Prix coup de cœur: "Ciel en Arc" – Société d'Équipement de la Touraine
- 2009: Lauréat Observeur du design 09: "Éole, le village du vent, aire de jeux pour enfants de 2 à 7 ans" – Wiki-cat and ADAPEI 79
- 2009: Lauréat Observeur du design 09: "Exposition énergies" – SMEPE Haute-Garonne
- 2009: Lauréat Observeur du design 09: "Birdlike, éolienne Farwind de 1MW" – Vergnet
- 2011: Lauréat Observeur du design 11: "SMS, Sani Module System" – Sanitec
- 2011: Lauréat Observeur du design 11: "Savebag, le book, cahier d’idées" – Savebag
- 2011: Lauréat Observeur du design 11: "Chenonceau Store" – Château de Chenonceau
- 2011: Rolling stock price by French magazine "Ville, rail & transports": "Moovi TER" – Brittany (administrative region)
- 2011: Rail d’Argent by French magazine "Ville, rail & transports": "Intercités Normandie" – Région Haute-Normandie

== Locations ==
RCP Design Global Head Office

- 56 avenue Marcel Dassault, 37200 Tours France

RCP Design Global Paris Office

- 4 Place d'Estienne d'Orves, 75009 Paris France

== See also ==
- Sensory design
- Design
