= Le Mans tramway =

Tram system in Pays de la Loire, France

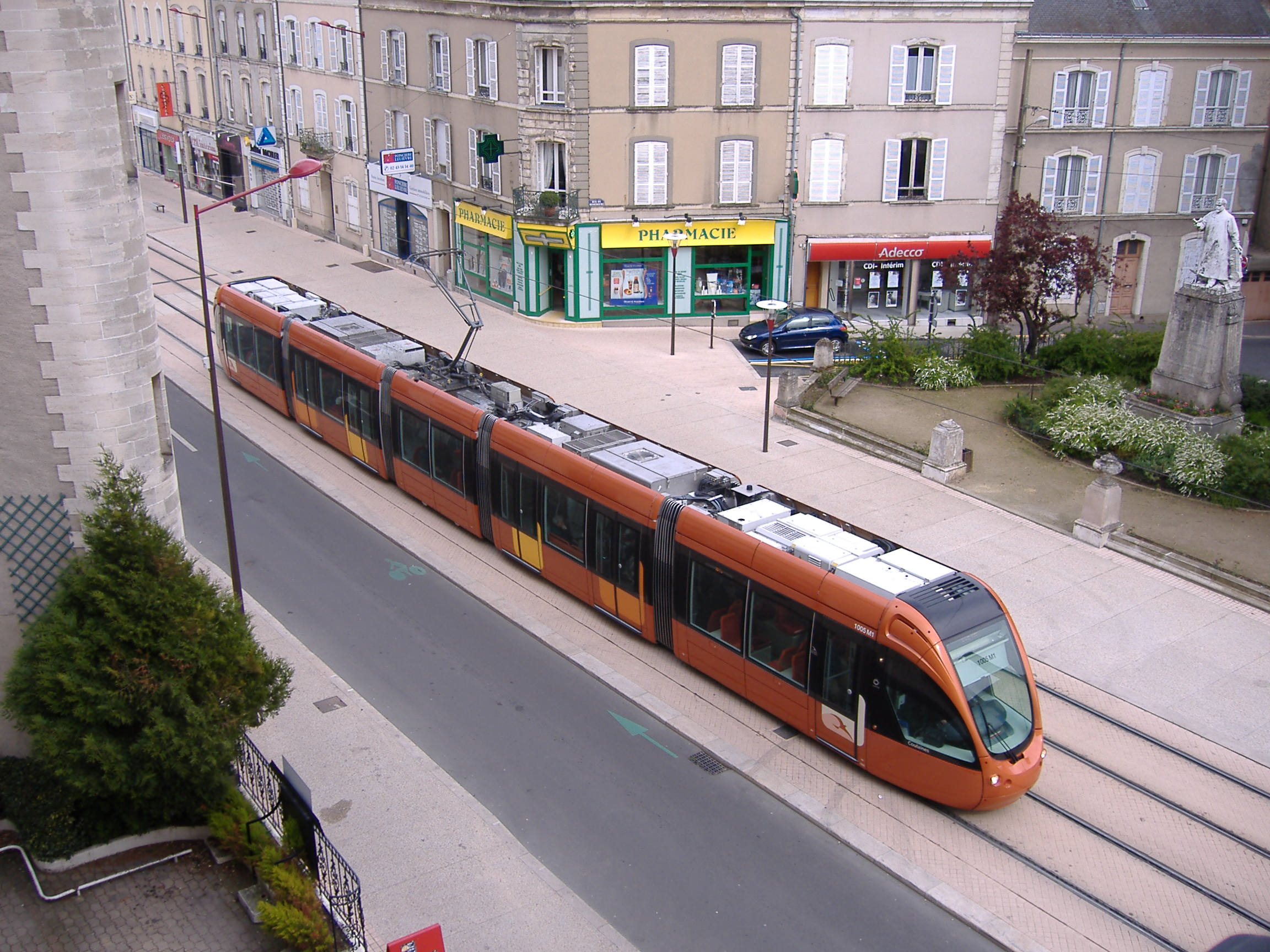

Overview
- Native name: Tramway du Mans
- Locale: Le Mans, Pays de la Loire, France
- Transit type: Tram
- Number of lines: 2
- Number of stations: 35
- Annual ridership: 18.6 million (2017)

Operation
- Began operation: 17 November 2007
- Operator: Société d'Économie Mixte des Transports en Commun de l'Agglomération Mancelle (SETRAM)

Technical
- System length: 18.8 km (11.7 mi)
- Track gauge: 1,435 mm (4 ft 8 1/2 in) standard gauge
System map
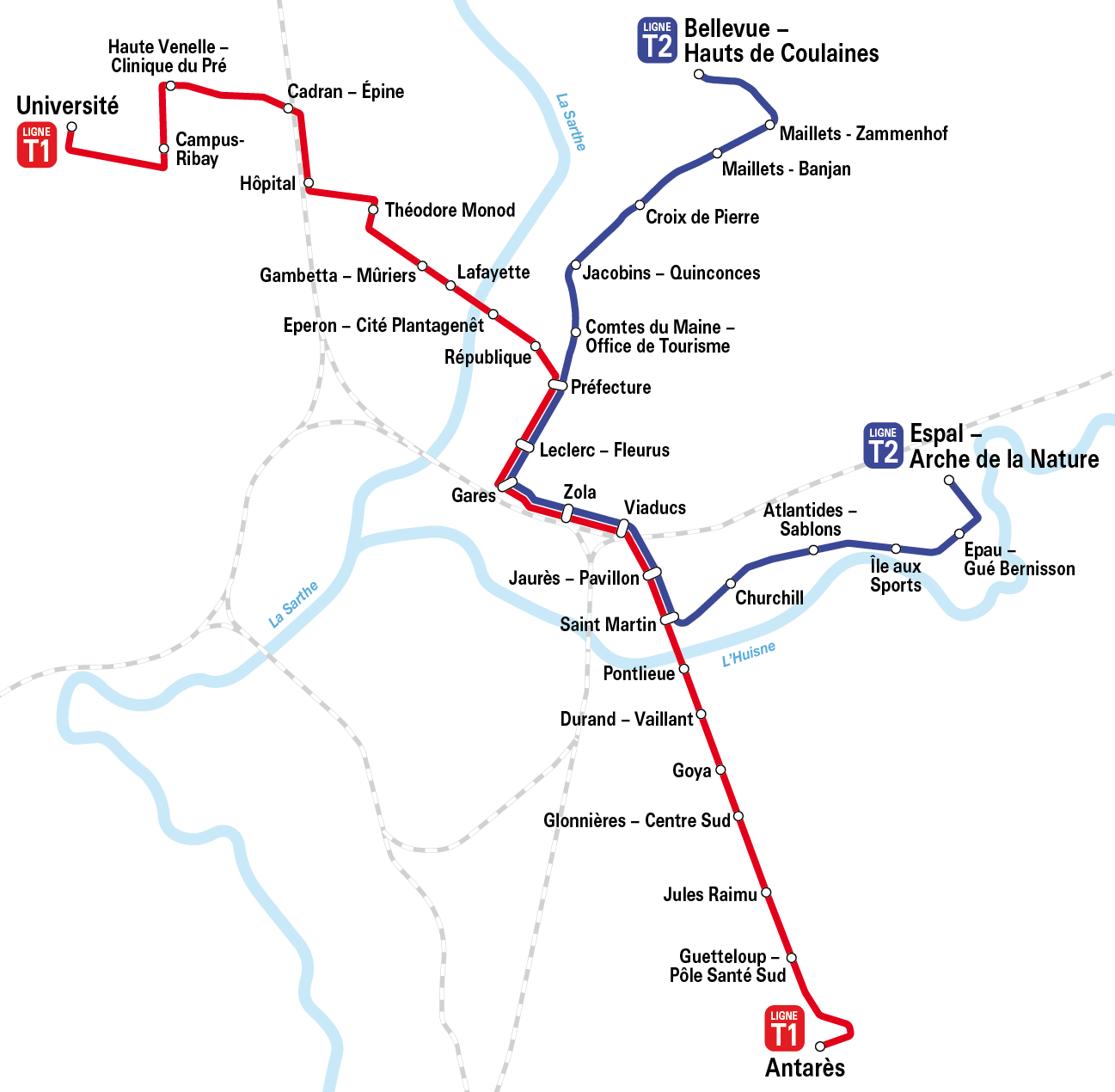
ram on Avenue du Général Leclerc in Le Mans

The Le Mans tram (French: Tramway du Mans) serves the city of Le Mans in the Pays de la Loire department of France.

== History ==
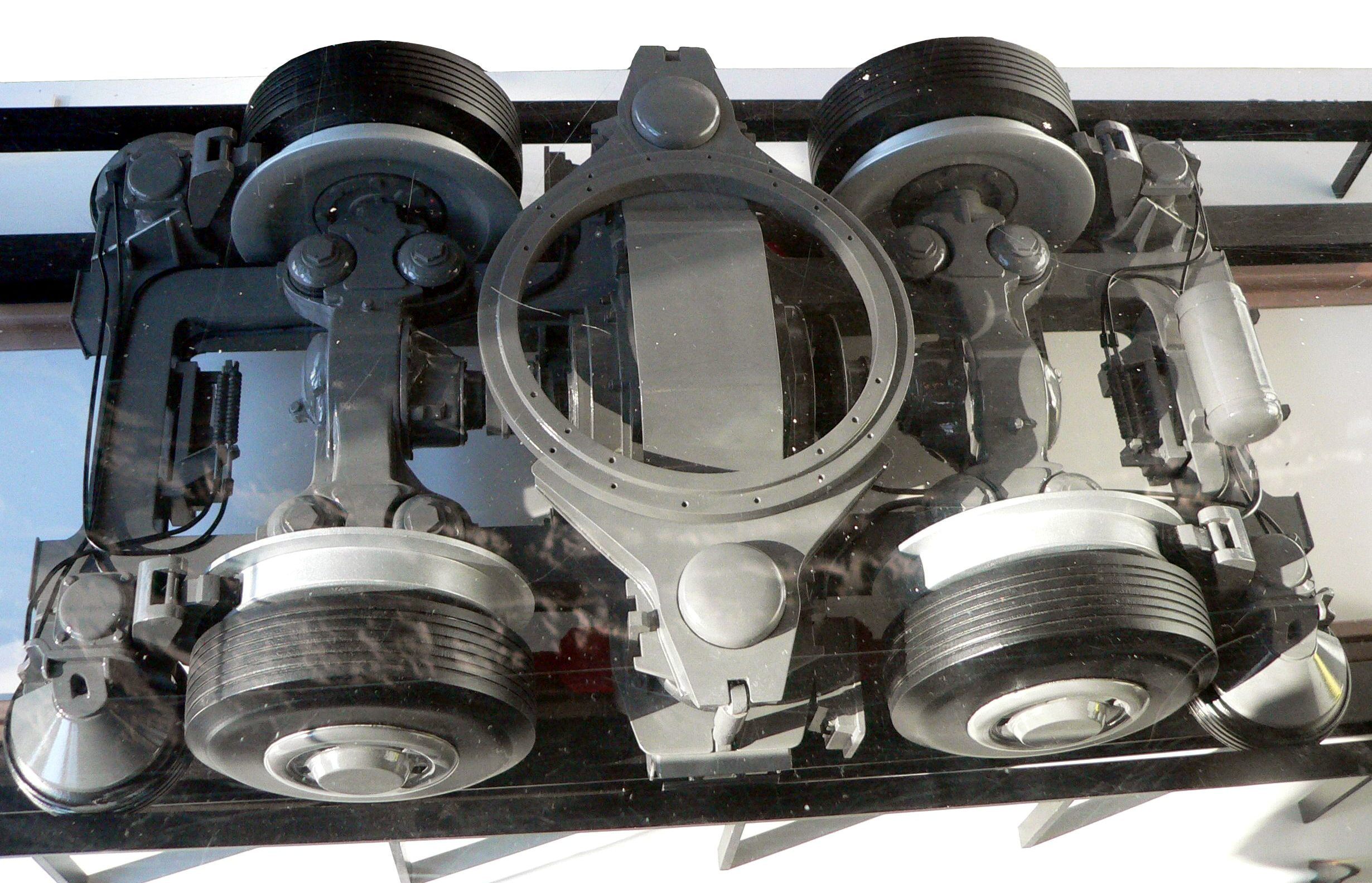
Alstom's T3 work includes bogies, like this mockup of a pneumatic bogie system for an MP 89 carriage on the Meteor metro, showing the two special wheelsets.

The Le Mans tramway opened on the 17 November 2007.

As of January 2026, the tramway comprises two lines, T1 and T2, with a seven-station overlap in town center. The city plans to open a third T3 line during the summer of 2026.

The most recent addition to the tramway occurred on the 30 August 2014 which added a connection to Bellevue and created the second line T2, which before had been a single line with branch. The original section of line is considered unusually cheap, costing 302 million euros for 15.4 km. There are no current plans to extend the current the two lines.

In March 2024, Alstom announced that it had won a 57 million euro contract to build a new, third T3 tramway line. Work includes extension of current tramways from 32 to 44 metres and modernisation. The contract aims to increase transport capacity by 40%. Support for Alstom's work will come from its sites in: La Rochelle and Crespin (design, industrialization, assembly of trams), Le Creusot (bogies), Ornans (engines), Villeurbanne (on-board electronics), Aix-en-Provence (tachometric units), and Tarbes (cooling units, power modules). Construction on T3 began in 2025.

== Operations ==
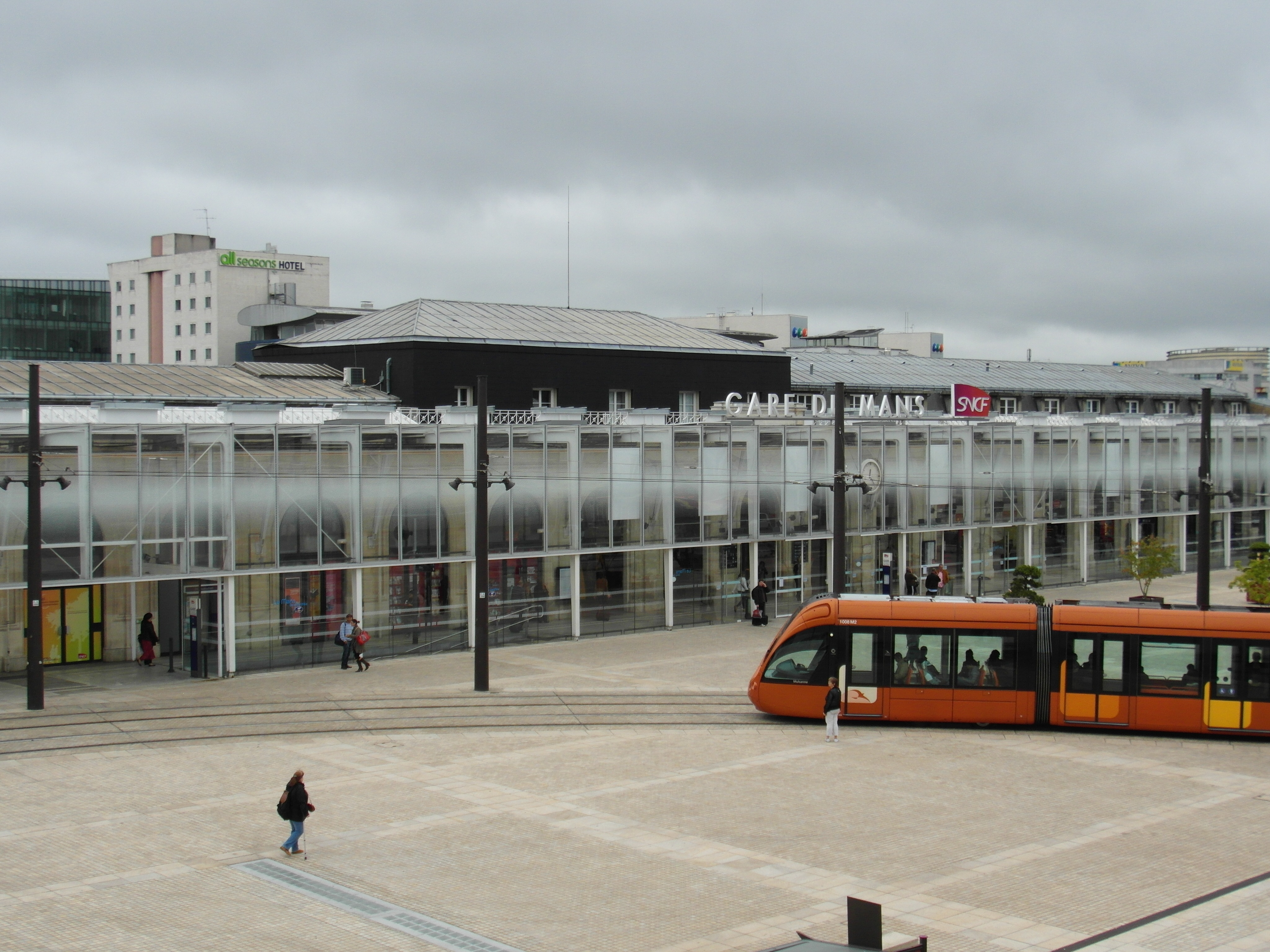
Tram arriving at Gare du Mans, where T1 and T2 lines currently overlap and where T3 will join them in the summer of 2026.

As of October 2025, the official Le Mans Metropole advises that Le Mans continues to offer its two tram lines, T1 and T2, which criss-cross the city. T1 runs 24 stations between in a diagonal from the Antarès stop in the southeast to the Université stop in the northeast. T2 runs 18 stations in a half circle from the Bellevue-Hauts de Coulaines stop in the east to the Espal-Arche de la nature stop in the northeast. The T3 line will extend the crisscrossing by running from an Allonnes - Bois Joli stop in the southwest to the stop at Gare du Mans, the city's main train station on the southwest edge of town center and overlapping with the T1 and T2 lines.

During peak hours, trams reach stations every six minutes and at overlapping T1-T2 stations, between the Prefecture and Saint-Martin stops, every three minutes.

General hours of operation are:

- 05:00 to 01:00 next morning on weekdays and Saturdays
- 06:00 to 01:00 next day on Sundays and public holidays

== Rolling stock ==
The design of the rolling stock was carried out by RCP Design Global agency, which formulated the general concept, fabrics, interior environment and the tram delivery on behalf of Alstom.

== See also ==
- Trams in France
- List of town tramway systems in France
- Le Mans
