= Sensory design =

Design based on human perceptions

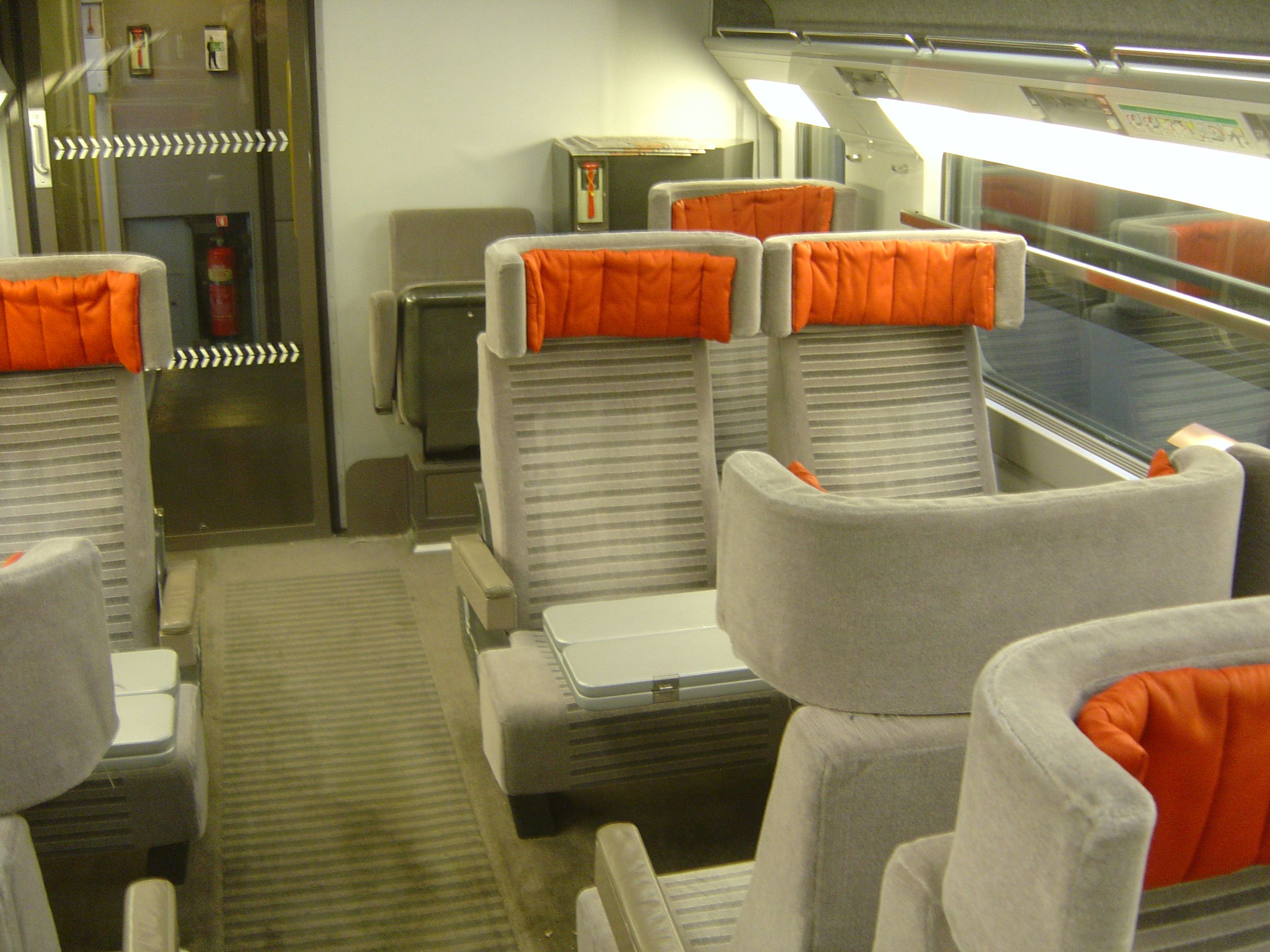
Eurostar Leisure Select Seats

Sensory design aims to establish an overall diagnosis of the sensory perceptions of a product, and define appropriate means to design or redesign it on that basis. It involves an observation of the situations in which a product is used and an assessment of the users' opinion, its positive and negative aspects in terms of tactility, appearance, sound and so on.

Sensory assessment aims to quantify and describe, in a systematic manner, all human perceptions when confronted with a product. A sensory analysis of a product is either carried out by a panel of trained testers, or by specialized test equipment designed to mimic the perception of humans.

== Use in Transportation ==
In the transportation sphere, sensory analysis are sometimes translated into minor enhancements to the design for a vehicle interior, information system, or station environment to smooth some of the rougher edges of the travel experience. For example, specialized air purifying equipment can be used to design a more pleasant odor in train compartments.

== Use in Food and Beverage Industry ==
Sensory design plays a critical role in the modern food and beverage industry. The food and beverage industry attempts to maintain specific sensory experiences. In addition to smell and flavor, the color (e.g. ripe fruits) and texture of food (e.g. potato chips) are also important. Even the environment is important as "Color affects the appetite, in essence, the taste of food".

Food is a multi-sensorial experience in which all five senses (vision, touch, sound, smell and taste) come together to create a strong memory.

In food marketing, the goal of the marketers is to design their products so that those food and beverage would stimulate as many senses of the customers.

At restaurants, many sensorial aspects such as the interior design (vision), texture of the chairs and tables (touch), background music and the noise level (sound), openness of the kitchen and cooking scene (smell and vision), and of course, the food itself (taste), all come together before a customer decides if he or she likes the experience and would want to revisit.

In recent research, the role of vestibular sense, a system that contributes to sense of balance and space, has been highlighted in relation to food. Often be referred as "the sixth sense", researches show that vestibular senses that are exhibited through people's postures while eating, can shape their perceptions for food. In general, people tend to rate food as better-tasting when they consume it while sitting down, compared to standing up. The researches conclude that the perception of food and vestibular system is in the result of the different stress levels caused according to the postures.

== Use in Architecture ==
Similar to food that used to be regarded merely as an experience of taste, architecture in the past used to be subjected only to sense of vision, which is why much of architectural products relied on visual forms of photographs, or television. In contrast, architecture has become a multi-sensory experience in which people visit the architectural sites and feel the various sensory aspects such as the texture of the building, background noise and the scent of the surrounding area, and the overall look of the building in coordination with the nature and the area.

Furthermore, there is a type of design in architecture field called "responsive architecture", which is a design that interacts with people. This kind of architecture could promote the occupants' lifestyle if sensory design is properly applied. For instance, if a responsive architecture is helping an occupant with a goal to exercise more, sensory design can arrange its environmental stimuli in time along an occupant’s path, like a space may serve to feed occupants through their senses to inspire and teach exercise at just the right time and in just the right way. When it comes to the experience of architecture, our visual senses only play a small part. This is also why when architects are designing, they need to think of "after-the-moment" experience instead of merely "in-the-moment" experience for the occupants.

== Sensory Design Technologies ==
While classically limited to the perception of trained sensory experts, advances in sensors and computation have allowed objective quantified measurements of sensory information to be acquired, quantified and communicated leading to improved design communication, translation from prototype to production, and quality assurance. Sensory areas that have been objectively quantified include vision, touch, and smell.

=== Vision ===
In vision both light and color are considered in sensory design. Early light meters (called extinction meters) relied on the human eye to gauge and quantify the amount of light. Subsequently, analog and digital light meters have been popularized for photography. Work by Lawrence Herbert in the 1960s led to a systematic combination of lighting and color samples required to quantify colors by human eye. This became the basis for the Pantone Matching System. Combining this with specialized light meters allowed digital color meters to be invented and popularized.

=== Touch ===
Touch plays an important role in a variety of products and is increasingly considered in product design and marketing efforts. Classically the field of tribology has developed various tests to evaluate interacting surfaces in relative motion with a focus on measuring friction, lubrication, and wear. However these measurements do not correlate with human perception.

Alternative methods for evaluating how materials feel were first popularized from work initiated at Kyoto University. The Kawabata evaluation system developed six measurements of how fabrics feel. The SynTouch Haptics Profiles produced by the SynTouch Toccare Haptics Measurement System that incorporates a biomimetic tactile sensor to quantify 15 dimensions of touch based on psychophysics research performed with over 3000 materials.

=== Smell ===
Measuring odors has remained difficult. A variety of techniques have been attempted but “Most measures have had a subjective component that makes them anachronistic with modern methodology in experimental behavioral science, indeterminate regarding the extent of individual differences, unusable with infra humans and of unproved ability to discern small differences”. New methods for robotic exploration of smell are being proposed.

== Bibliography ==
- Joy Monice Malnar and Frank Vodvarka, Sensory Design, (Minneapolis: University of Minnesota Press, 2004). ISBN 0-8166-3959-0
- (in French) Louise Bonnamy, Jean-François Bassereau, Régine Charvet-Pello. Design sensoriel. Techniques de l'ingénieur, 2009
- (in French) Jean-François Bassereau, Régine Charvet-Pello. Dictionnaire des mots du sensoriel. Paris, Tec & Doc - Editions Lavoisier, 2011, 544 p. ISBN 2-7430-1277-3

== See also ==
- Interaction design
- Communication design
- Environmental design
- Experience design
- WikID
