= Trams in Versailles =

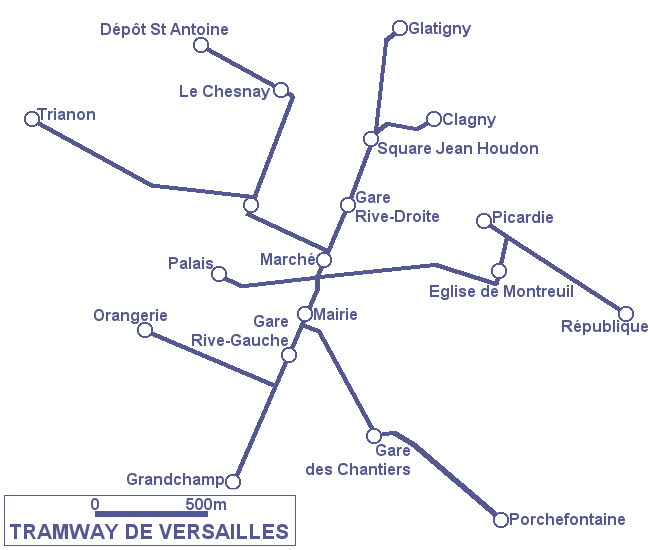
Network of the Tramway de Versailles around 1920. No line numbers are present on the map due to a change in line letters between 1914 and 1950. Maps of the Network in 1896, 1914 and 1950.

The Tramway de Versailles or Tramway Versaillais was a 1,435 mm (4 ft 8 1/2 in) standard gauge tramway system serving the French city of Versailles.

The first lines opened in 1896 and served:

- Square Duplessis – Grandchamps
- la Rive Droite – Sénat
- la Rive Gauche – Chambre Députés.

The first modernisation was the opening of a steam tram between Versailles and Saint-Cyr-l'École on 20 November 1889. The second happened in October 1895 when the SVTE (Société Versaillaise de Tramways électriques) took over the network, electrified it and purchased 29 electric tramways from the Postel-Vinay works.

The network went from three to six lines and served:

- Line A: Glatigny – Granchamp
- Line B: Clagny – Orangerie
- Line C: Le Chesnay – Chantiers
- Line D: Square Jean Houdon – Montreuil
- Line E: Rive Droite – Trianon
- Line F: Rive Gauche – St Cyr

In 1907, line C was extended to Porchefontaine and line D to République.

During the 1950s the network was formed only of lines A, B, C and E. It was seriously amputated at the dawn of World War II and closed on 3 March 1957 during a glorious celebration with 200 000 inhabitants, the mayor of Versailles, Maurice Chevalier and the baptism of the replacing buses.

== Rolling stock ==
- Horse-drawn trams.
- 29 electric Postel-Vinay tramcars (1896), transformed in 1922 and renumbered 1 to 9. They were open-ended and painted in yellow and white. the tramcars were staffed by two men, a wattman, who drove the trams, and a ticket inspector, who was in charge of collecting fares, the trolley pole and point levers. The tramcars were modernised after World War I and their open ends closed as well as the replacing of the two motors by one more powerful.
- 2 Carde double-decker tramcars (1908).
- 4 large capacity tramcars (1927), numbered 53 to 56 and capable of transporting 55 seated passengers.
- 1 modern Satramo tramcars (1930).
- 11 transformed Postel-Vinay tramcars in 1933, numbered 10 to 20.

The tramcars received their definite livery in the 1940s and were painted in blue and light grey.

=== Tramcars in preservation ===
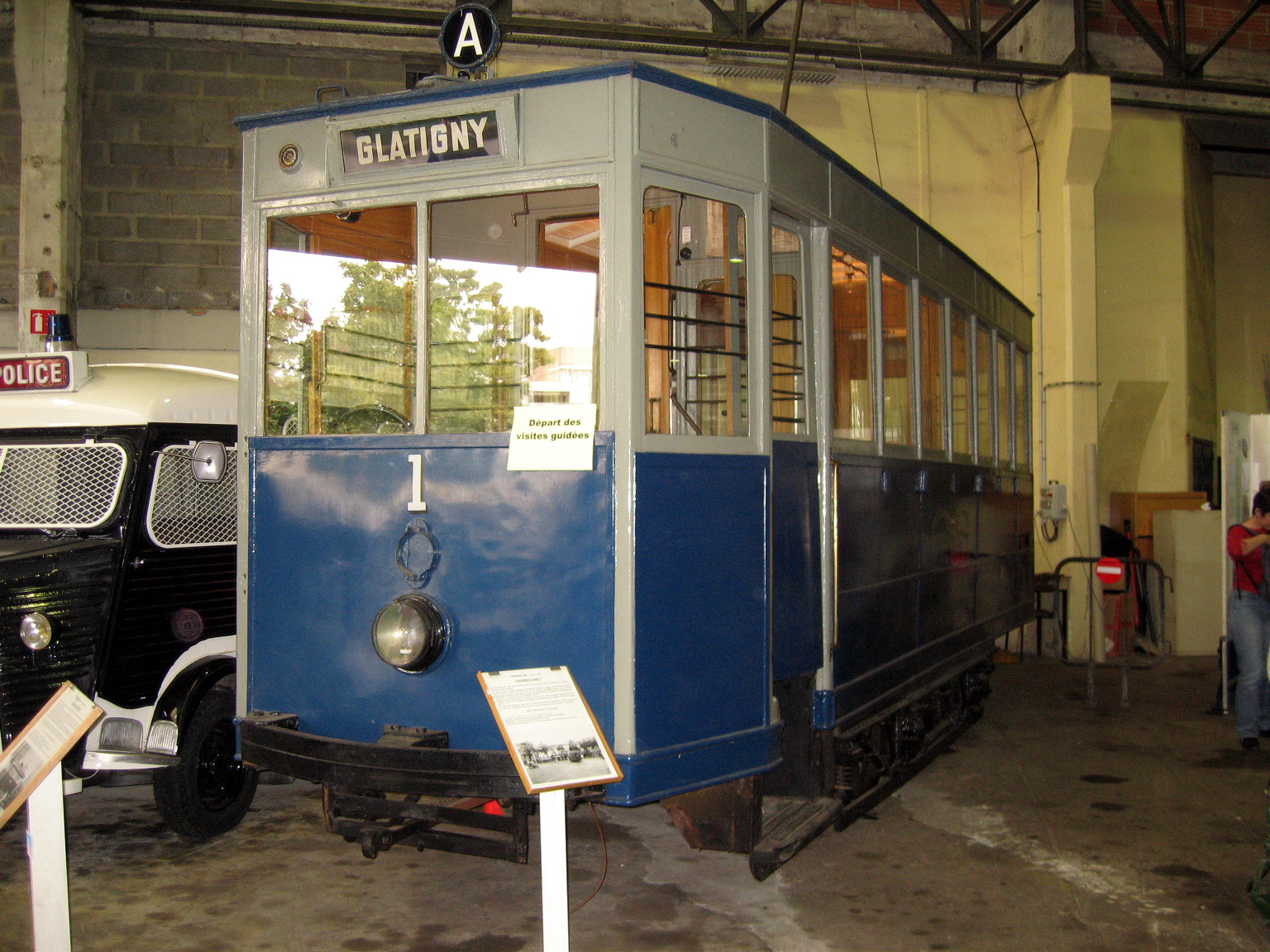
Preserved tram

Tramcar n°1 is preserved at the AMTUIR in Saint-Mandé. It was the first tram "rescued" by the museum on 16 March 1957. It was acquired by the museum from EDF thanks to contributions by amateurs.

Tramcar n°1 data	
Length	8.12m
Width	2.00m
Height	3.61m
Gross weight	10.2t
Capacity	20/19
Engine	GE 800 25 hp
Current	by trolley
Truck	Postel-Vinay
Gauge	1,435 mm (4 ft 8 1/2 in)
