= Angers tramway =

Tramway network in Angers, Pays de la Loire, France

Coordinates: 47.4736°N 0.5542°W

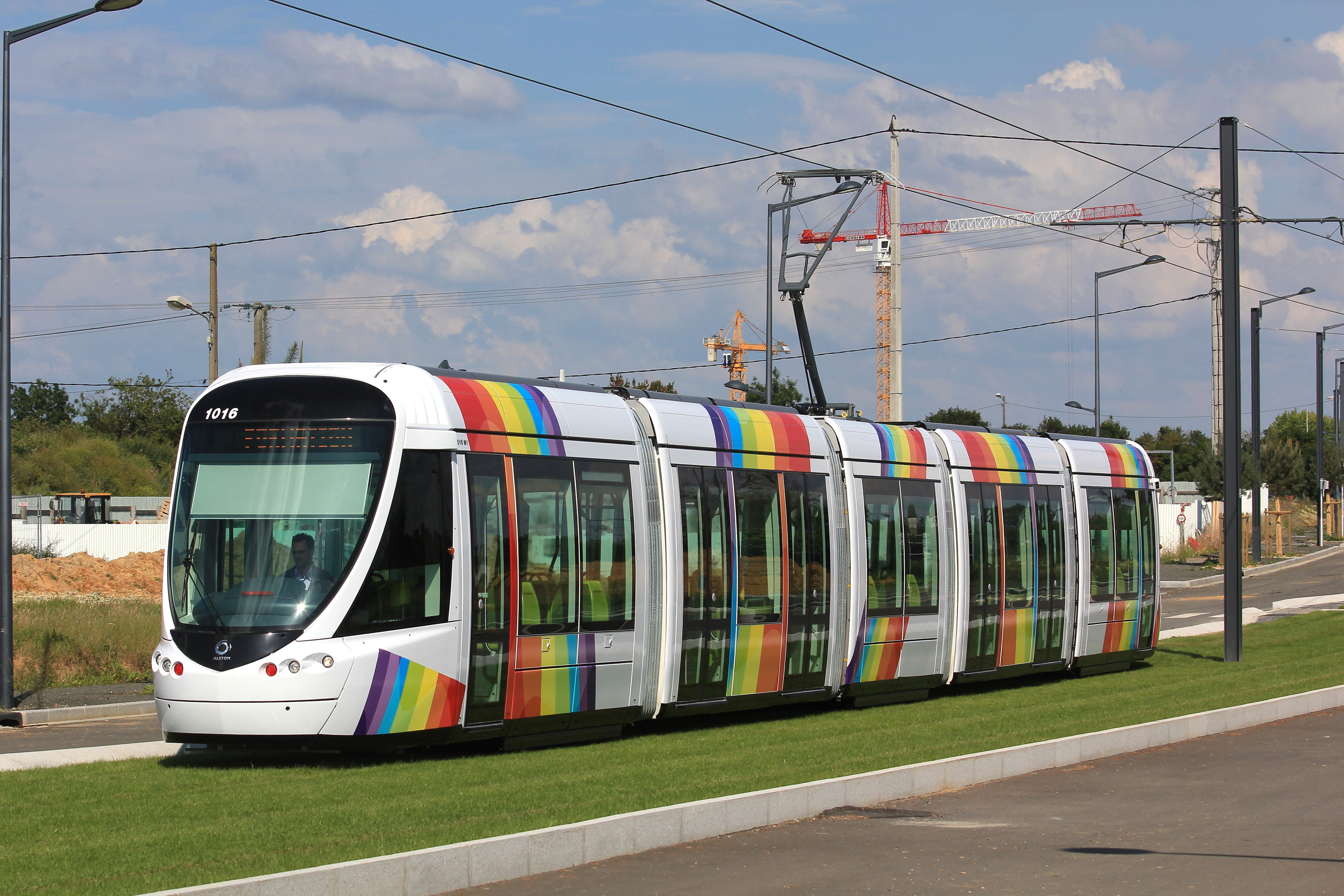

Overview
- Native name: Tramway d'Angers
- Locale: Angers, Pays de la Loire, France
- Transit type: Tram
- Number of lines: 3
- Number of stations: 42
- Annual ridership: 10.05 million (2018)

Operation
- Began operation: 25 June 2011
- Operator: RATP Dev

Technical
- System length: 22.4 km (13.9 mi)
- Track gauge: 1,435 mm (4 ft 8 1/2 in) standard gauge
- Electrification: Overhead line Ground level power supply in city centre

The Angers tramway (French: Tramway d'Angers) is the tramway network in the French city of Angers in Pays de la Loire.

Opened on 25 June 2011, the system is operated by RATP Dev and replaced some bus lines, with the buses redeployed throughout the rest of the metropolitan area. The Alstom APS ground-level power supply has been used on two parts of the line totalling 1.5 km (0.93 mi) in order to avoid overhead lines in the centre of Angers and Avrillé. Angers is the third city using such system, after Bordeaux and Reims.

== Timeline ==
- April 2007: Works officially started.
- April 2010: Delivery of the Alstom Citadis 302 trams
- December 2010: Testing
- January 2011: Operation of shadow service without passengers
- 25 June 2011: Line A in service
- 8 July 2023: Line B and C in service

== Current Service ==
The total budget for the first line, re-evaluated in 2008, is around €350m (€47m for the trams), up from the 2004 estimate of €250m.

Main features for Line A:

- North-South connection across the metropolitan area, connecting Avrillé (third most populous town ) to La Roseraie (most populous district in Angers).
- Non-stop service from 5.30 AM until 0.30 AM (19 hours a day)
- 12 kilometers (7.5 mi)
- 25 stations
- End to end journey time of 37 minutes;
- Average speed of 20 km/h (13 mph)
- 6 minute headways during peak hours.
- an estimated 35,000 passengers expected daily.

As the line goes on both banks of the Maine, a new bridge was built to allow the trams to cross the river. It connects Angers' University Hospital Centre to Saint-Serge. This 270m bridge is accessible to bicycles and pedestrians as well as emergency vehicles.

=== Stations ===
- Angers-Roseraie
- Jean Vilar
- Jean XXIII
- Bamako
- Strasbourg
- Place Lafayette
- Les Gares
- Foch-Haras
- Foch-Maison Bleue
- Ralliement
- Molière
- Saint-Serge Université
- Berges de Maine
- C.H.U-Hôpital
- Capucins
- Jean Moulin
- Les Hauts De Saint Aubin
- Verneau
- Terra Botanica
- Plateau Mayenne
- Bois du Roy
- Acacias
- Saint Gilles
- Bascule
- Avrillé-Ardenne

=== Advantages ===
- Good public transport system for Avrillé (third town in the metropolitan area after Angers and Trélazé), bringing more life to the city centre and assisting with the development of new neighbourhoods
- Connecting new districts: Plateaux de la Mayenne and des Capucins
- Tram station close to Terra Botanica
- Connecting important facilities such as the University Hospital Centre (4,500 employees and 3,000 visitors a day), Angers Saint-Laud railway station and the administrative city
- The new bridge on the Maine is used by trams, bicycles and pedestrians between the hospital and Gaumont studios.
- A better connections to the Angers city centre and improved traffic flows
- A more attractive city centre (including a larger pedestrian area)
- Complementarity of different transport types around the central connection point, Angers Saint-Laud railway station and bus station
- Connecting La Roseraie as part of the urban renovation of the district.

=== Drawbacks ===
- Line A passes through place du Ralliement, which will still be accessible for pedestrians, emergency and delivery vehicles as well as bicycles, but buses will not have access to it.

== Rolling stock ==
Angers Loire Métropole awarded Alstom a €47m contract to supply 17 Citadis 302 trams on 15 November 2006. A further 20 units were supplied for the expansion of the network.

=== Design of rolling stock ===
Design and personalization of the rolling stock is characterized by the front end "convergence" V-shape similar in form to a shield. The other major feature is the ubiquity of a rainbow, designed by the French agency RCP Design Global is found in the color scheme and interior design of the trams and other transportation in the city.

The interior of the trams is marked by floral figures in different colors on the ceiling, white walls and green seats to reflect the geological layers of Anjou.

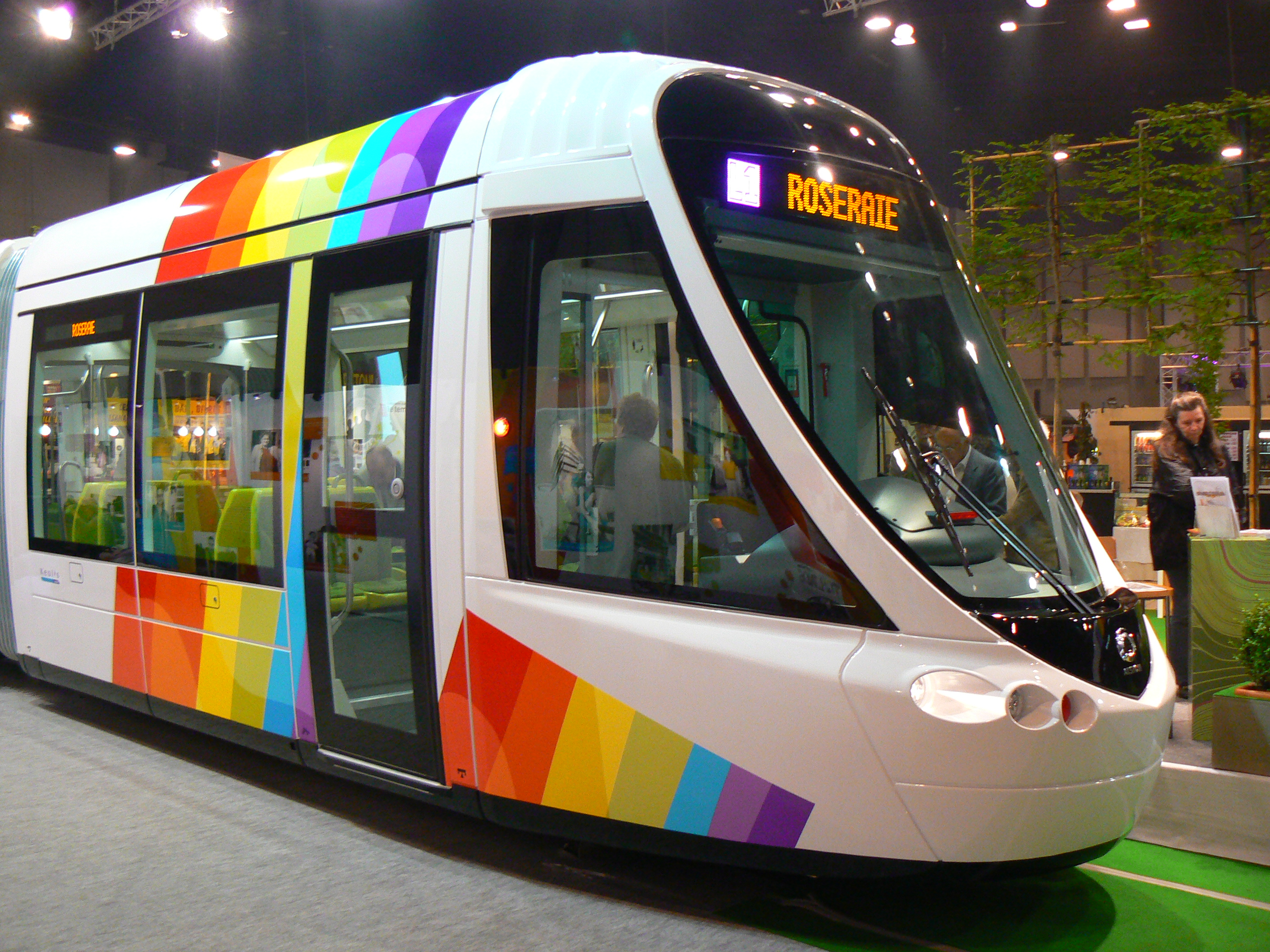
External design - by RCP Design Global

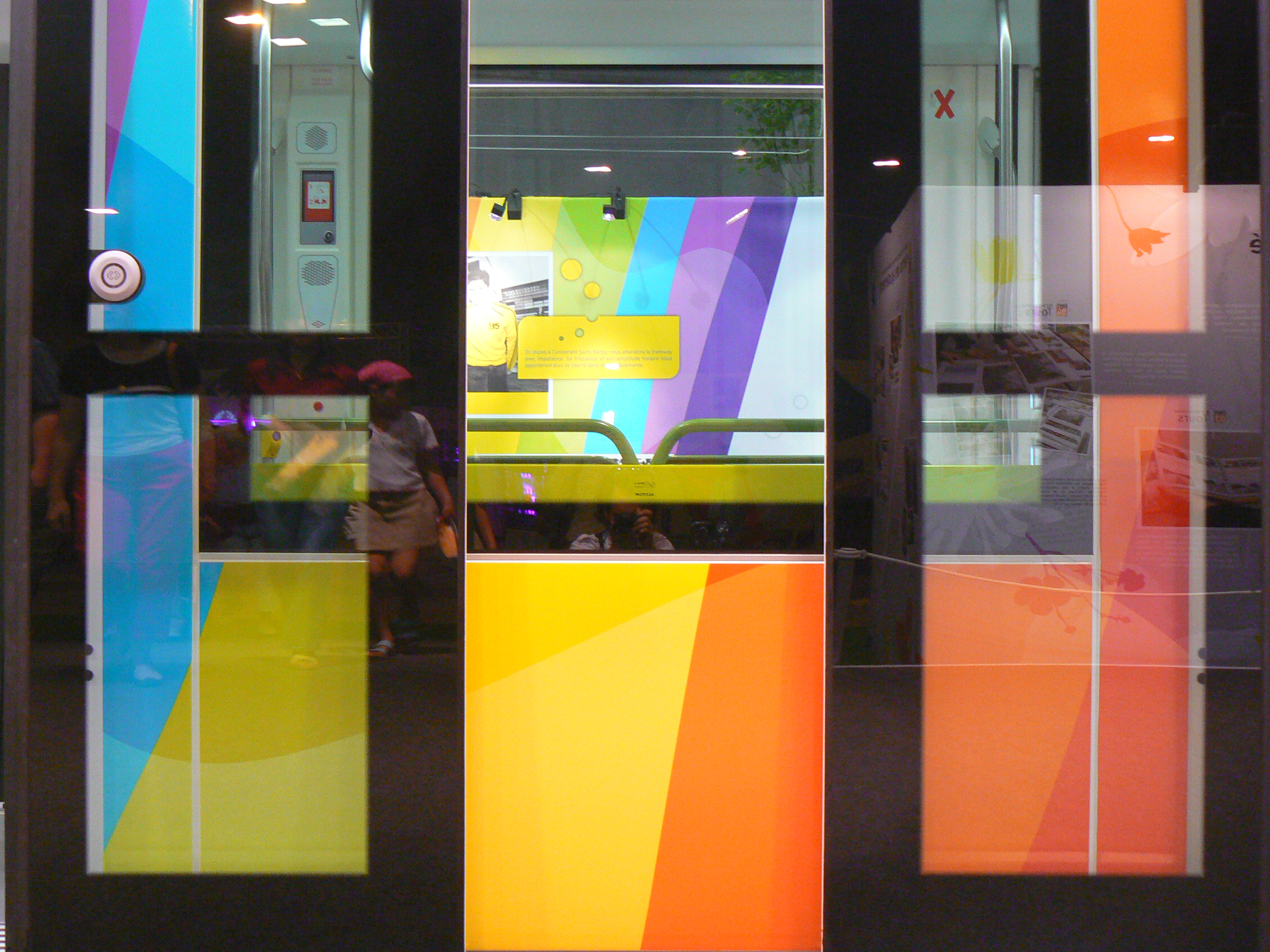
The rainbow

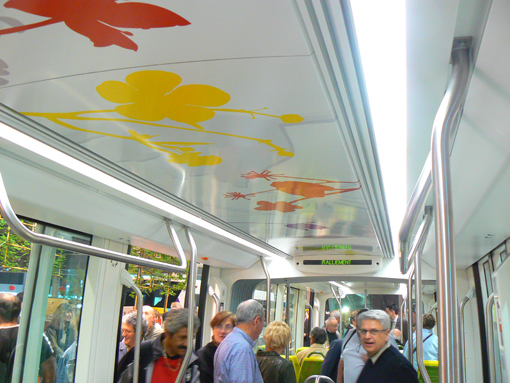
Ceiling view with the floral figures

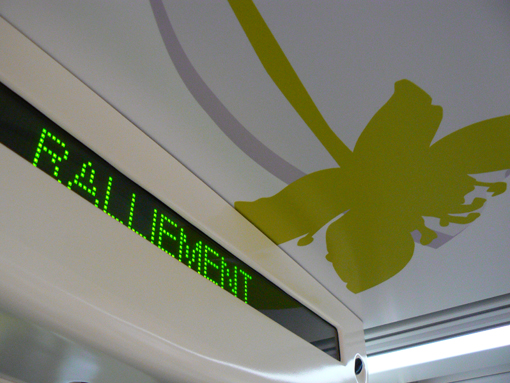
Ceiling view

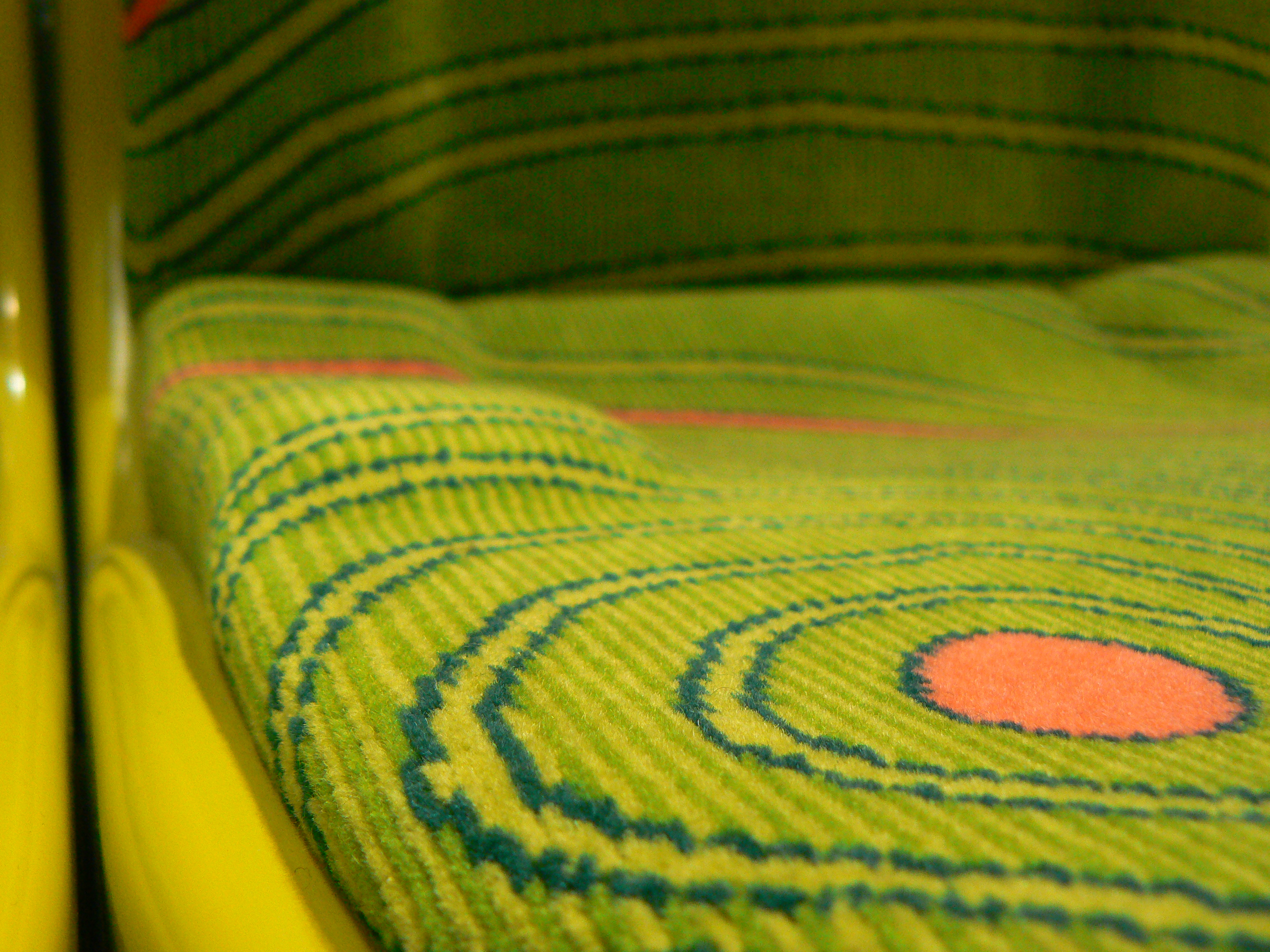
Seat of the Angers tramway

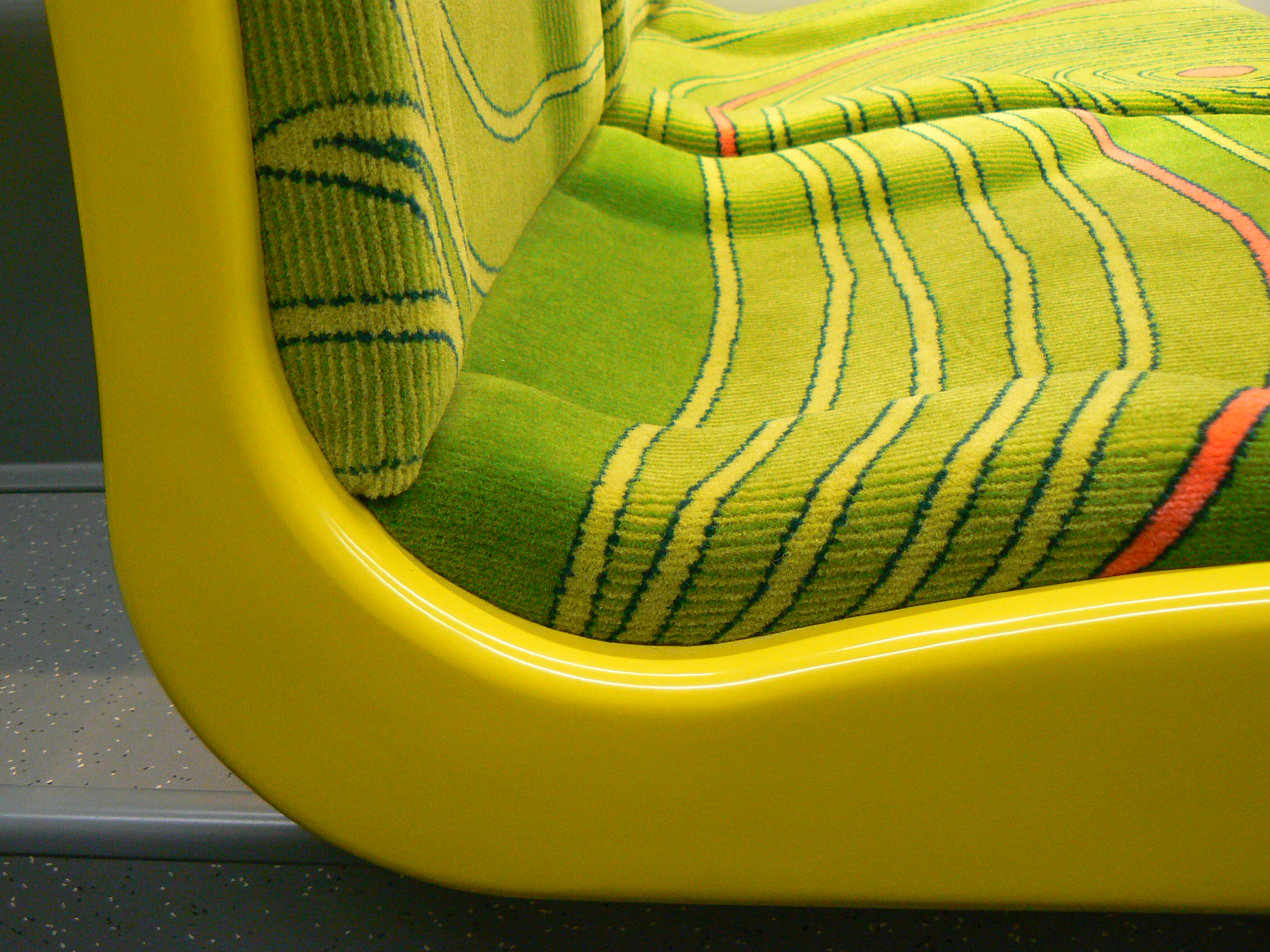
Seat view - design by RCP Design Global

== Future services ==
The 16 km (9.9 mi) Line B was expected to be opened by 2020. It was planned to run from Beaucouzé, via the Atoll shopping centre via the Campus Belle-Beille - Université Angers to the main railway station and Parc des Expositions (Saint-Sylvain-d'Anjou) through Monplaisir district. However, in 2016 the city presented a revised proposal for the future Line B. Stopping at the Technopole Angers at the Universities Belle-Beille Campus, the lines length is stripped to 10 km (6.2 mi). Due to financial reasons, the start of construction has been postponed for 2019, so that a start of passenger transport can not be expected until 2022. The line, along with Line C, finally opened on 8 July 2023.

It has been announced that the Line A will be rerouted from January 2021 via Centre de Congrès, avoiding Place du Railiement, using new tracks, a new junction south of Saint-Serge - Université and an existing junction immediately north of Foch-Maison Bleue that was built with the original line to facilitate a future expansion. The new route will serve two new stops at Centre de Congrès and Hôtel de Ville. The existing route between Molière and Foch-Maison Bleue will be retained as part of Line C that will run between Line B's western terminus at Belle-Beille - Campus and Line A's southern terminus at Angers - Roseraie allowing a direct connection between Belle Beille and Angers-Saint-Laud station.

== See also ==
- Trams in France
- List of town tramway systems in France
