= Trams in Padua =

Tram system in Padua

Padua Tramway
- Tramway sur pneumatiques
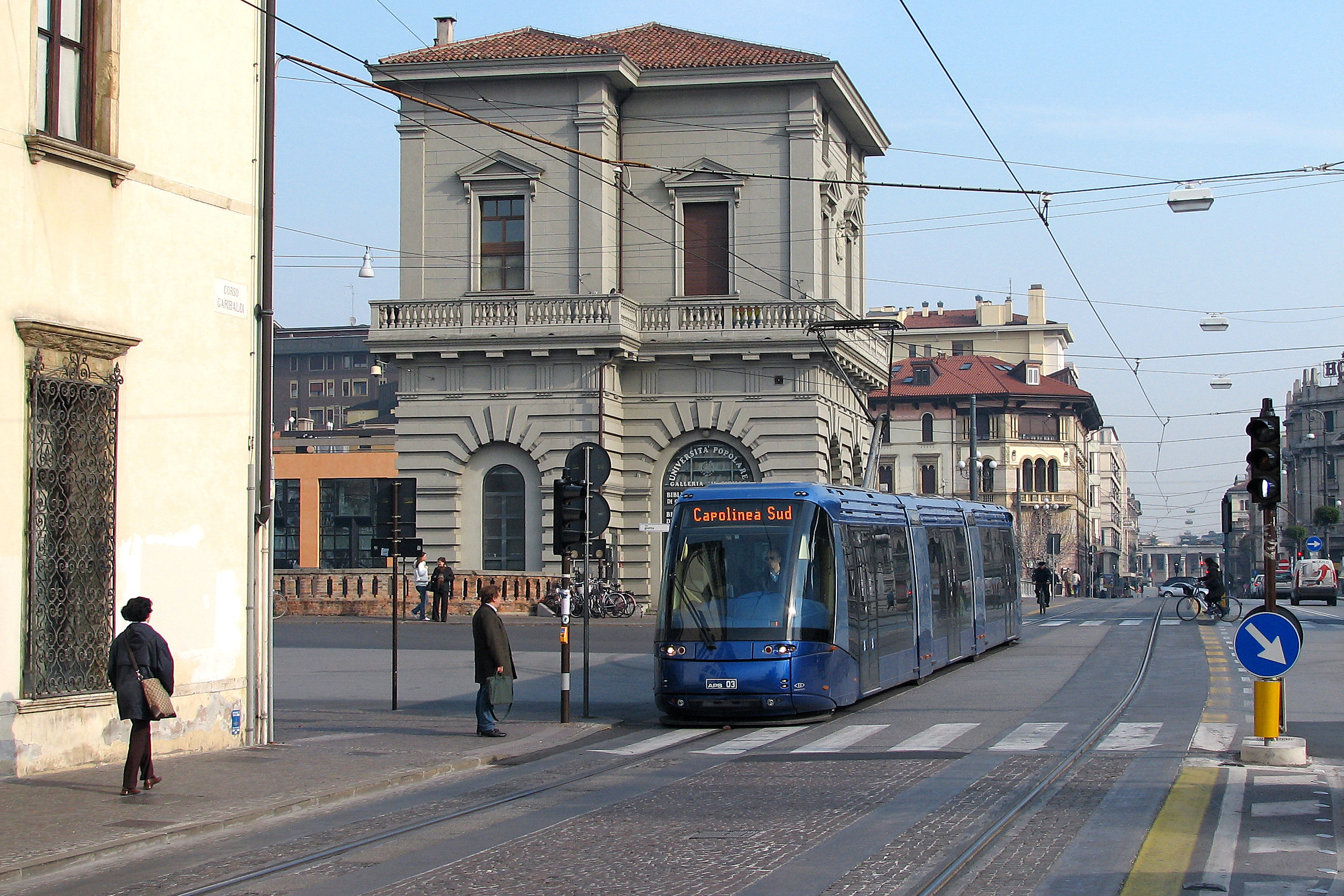

Operation
- Locale: Padua, Veneto, Italy
- Open: 24 March 2007
- Status: Open
- Routes: 1
- Owner: APS Holding SPA
- Operator: APS (transit operator)

Infrastructure
- Track gauge: None, central guide rail
- Propulsion system: electric
- Electrification: 750 V DC Overhead line

Statistics
- Route length: 10.3 km (6.4 mi)
- 2010: 22,000 ▲11%
Overview
- Website: http://www.apsholding.it APS Holding

The Padua Tramway (Italian: Tranvia di Padova) serves Padua, a city in Veneto in Northern Italy. In operation since 2007, it is 10.3 kilometres (6.4 mi) long, and comprises a single line, designated SIR 1, linking the north with the south, calling at the main station and then passing the historic city centre.

Unlike the one in operation until the 1950s, it is not a tram of the classical type. The system, built in the 21st century, uses the French Translohr system (tramway sur pneumatiques, i.e., cars run on rubber tyres, with a single central rail serving for guidance and return current). This means that the system is variously referred to as tram, rubber-tyred tramway, metrotram or metrobus in order to distinguish it from the technology of the classical rail-based tram. In any case, the adopted traffic signage is that of traditional trams.

It is operated by Busitalia Veneto S.p.A., owned 55% by Busitalia Nord and 45% by APS Padova.

In 2010 the line carried 11% of the passengers of the entire APS network.

In a survey by Altroconsumo in August 2010 on public transport in ten Italian cities, the Padua tram service was rated among the ones with the highest user satisfaction.

Thanks to the introduction of the line and the consequent reduction of car traffic, public transport in Padua gained an additional 2,000,000 users over two years.

Two additional lines designated SIR 2 and SIR 3 are under construction.

== Network ==
The Padua tramway currently consists of the following line:

Line	Route	Opening	Last extension	Km	Stops	Travel time
SIR 1	Pontevigodarzere - Stazione FS - Guizza	2007	2009	10.3	26 (25 per direction)	40'

Two additional lines are under construction, named "Sir 2" and "Sir 3".

=== SIR 1 ===
The line, named SIR 1 (Sistema Intermedio a Rete 1), has 26 stops and is currently the only active tram line in Padua (since March 24 2007). After completion of the Dalmazia-Sarpi railway overpass, inaugurated on October 24 2009, built to avoid interference between automobile traffic and the tramway on other sections of Padua's road network, the service was extended, on December 5 2009, to the northern section (stazione FS-northern terminus) with a new terminus (no longer the stazione FS but northern terminus-Pontevigodarzere).

In the Santo-Cavalletto section (about 600 meters) the tram does not use the overhead line but travels using special batteries that recharge during the journey. The entire switch system is computerized, although controlled by the operations center. On board there is a video surveillance system and an audio and visual system that announces the next stops or operational notices.

The tram runs for 70% of its route on a dedicated right-of-way, particularly in the sections:

- Stazione-Eremitani
- Santo-Cavalletto
- Santa Croce-Cuoco.

The system has 26 stops. It operates between 5:40 and 0:50 from Monday to Sunday. The travel time is expected to be 35 minutes, while the minimum headway during daytime on weekdays and pre-holidays is 6 minutes.

Each convoy is monitored by a GPS system, which reports the position of the convoy to the operations center. Thanks to this system, the time remaining until the arrival of the next convoy is displayed at each stop.

The number of passengers that can be transported per hour per direction is 2,200 passengers.

Twelve convoys are in service, guaranteeing a 6-minute interval. In Padua there are 18 convoys present and in service.

== History ==
Between 1883 and 1954, the city of Padua had a traditional tram network. The historic tramway having been closed down in 1954, the first proposals for the reintroduction of tramways in Padua appeared in 1990. However, only in 1995 the Municipality of Padua was granted state contributions (for a total cost estimated at €61.3 million) provided by law 211 of 26 February 1992 (support for mass rapid transport systems). For Padua, a tramway linking Fornace to Prato della Valle was proposed, which corresponds to part of the current SIR line 1. Ansaldo Transportation, Adtranz, Siemens and Fiat Railway submitted tenders in 1999.

As the city council change following elections in 1999, no contract followed. To avoid losing state funding a technical committee was formed to rework the project. It drew up a new urban mobility plan, taking into consideration local opposition's fear of unsightly overhead lines and rails in city streets. The new plans referred to an "integrated transport system using guideways".

The Europe-wide public tendering for building the current line SIR 1, issued in 2001, was won by a consortium led by De Simon, thanks to two promises: cars should have steering wheels allowing them to leave the tracks and the concrete guideways could be used by ordinary buses. However, the Translohr cars cannot be used off the guiding rail, leading to later criticism. Construction was then awarded to the Consortium Mantegna, consisting of the companies Rizzani de Eccher, Sicea, Lohr Industrie and De Simon. Work started on 31 March 2003 and ended in 2005. The original cost was given as 53 million euros, but increased by a further 15 million during construction.

Its construction was followed by test and driver training. During the test runs the Translohr system suffered five derailments.

Commercial operation of the service Translohr in Padua started 24 March 2007, the route length being 6.7 kilometres (4.2 mi), from the railway station to the southern terminus Guizza. On 5 December 2009, the line was extended north from the train station to the terminus Pontevigodarzere, thus reaching a total length of 10.3 kilometres (6.4 mi).

A further derailment occurred on 22 April 2010 due to a misaligned switch.

On 10 June 2019 a convoy on the SIR 1 line derailed, entering the opposite lane in a mixed-traffic section and ending its run in a ditch.

In addition to the existing line (SIR 1), two more are under construction: SIR 2 from the western suburb of Rubano to the eastern suburb of Vigonza through the city center, and SIR 3 to southern suburb of Voltabarozzo. In 2022 the works for the SIR 3 line were awarded, while construction began on 22 March 2023.

== Under construction ==
Line	Route	Start of works	Expected opening	Length	Stops
SIR 2	Rubano - Busa di Vigonza FS	November 8, 2024	-	18.3 km	34
SIR 3	Stazione FS - Voltabarozzo	March 22, 2023	-	5.5 km	12

=== SIR 2 ===
Rubano - Busa di Vigonza FS
Passing through Sarmeola, via Provvidenza, via Chiesanuova, corso Milano, Corso del Popolo, Stazione FS, via Venezia, Stanga, via San Marco, Ponte di Brenta. 18.25 km and 34 stops; the project provides for an additional and alternative eastern terminus, located at the future railway station of San Lazzaro, serving the new hospital complex; the Municipality of Padua, in order to obtain funding for the entire line, awarded the contract on September 4, 2019 and presented on January 16, 2021 the drafting of the "Technical-economic feasibility project" in order to participate in the 2019 allocation call as provided for by Law December 27, 2017, no. 205, art. 1, paragraph 1072, for the financing of interventions in fixed-installation rapid mass transport systems. The service is planned with 10 vehicles of 3 elements and 20 vehicles of 4 elements, with 84% of the route on a reserved lane. Funding amounts to €335,211,901.76 (of which €238,057,777 from the PNRR and €97,154,124 from state funds). The timetable foresees the awarding of the contract and opening of works on November 8, 2024, with completion of the project by June 30, 2026.

=== SIR 3 ===
Stazione FS - Voltabarozzo
Passing through Stazione FS, via Gozzi, via Morgagni, via Giustiniani, via Sografi, Sografi-Voltabarozzo cycle-pedestrian path, via Zeno, via Piovese. 5.4 km and 12 stops. The line was entirely funded by the Ministerial Decree allocating state funds signed by Minister Delrio on December 22, 2017. On July 27, 2020 the final design was presented, later approved by the City Council on May 27, 2021 and works began in the first half of 2023.

== Future ==
=== SIR 1 ===
Agreements signed by the Municipality of Padua exist to connect the municipalities of Cadoneghe (to the north) and Albignasego (to the south), but at present such solutions must be considered purely hypothetical, although included in the Sustainable Urban Mobility Plan.

=== S.M.A.R.T. system ===
On January 18, 2021 the Municipality of Padua presented the S.M.A.R.T. project, acronym for Sistema Metropolitano A Rete Tranviaria, which provides for the integration of the existing SIR 1 line with the under-construction SIR 2 and 3 lines, with the addition of a branch to the SIR 2 line to provide a connection to the new Padova Est Hospital and the future Padova San Lazzaro station.

The project envisages the creation of 8 different lines, distinguished by corresponding colors:

- Pontevigodarzere-Guizza (T1 - pink line)
- Rubano-Vigonza (T2 - light blue line)
- Rubano-San Lazzaro (T3 - purple line)
- Voltabarozzo-Vigonza (T4 - blue line)
- Voltabarozzo-San Lazzaro (T5 - yellow line)
- Pontevigodarzere-Voltabarozzo (T6 - orange line)
- Guizza-Vigonza (T7 - red line)
- Guizza-San Lazzaro (T8 - green line)

Funding for the entire project was included in the "National Recovery and Resilience Plan" (PNRR), presented by the Italian government to the European Commission on April 30, 2021. Works must be completed by July 1, 2026.

== Rolling stock ==
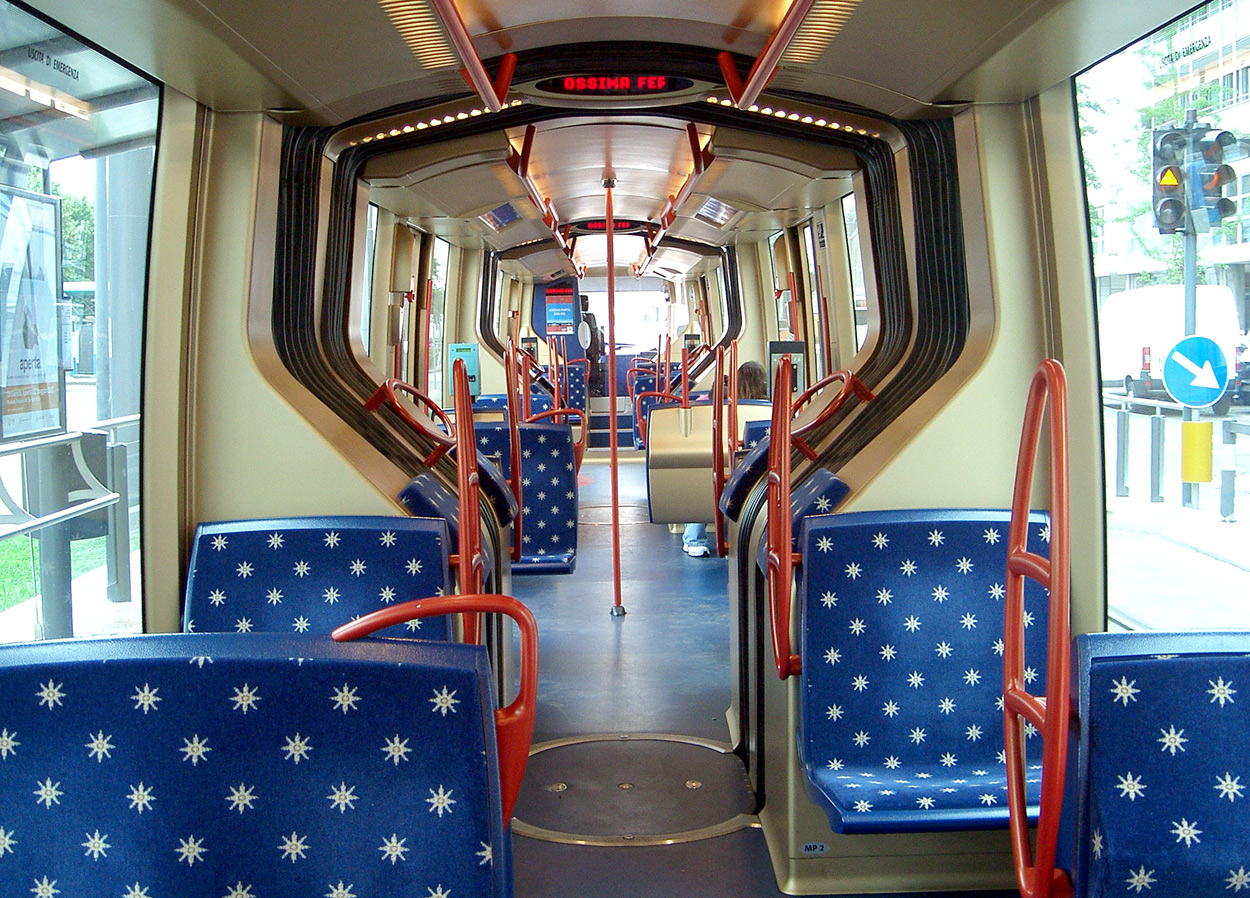
Interior of the Padua tram, SIR 1 line. In the foreground, the interior design inspired by the starry sky of the Scrovegni Chapel.

The tram service is operated with STE3 vehicles, 25 meters long, with a vehicle height of 289 cm (without pantograph extended), with a capacity of 164 seats and with an expected commercial speed of about 20 km/h. The floor has a height above ground of 23 cm and the vehicle can turn with a minimum radius of 10.5 m (of rail). The clearance of two trams side by side is 5.40 m in double lane. The load exerted on the tires is about 7 tonnes per axle. The interior features blue seats with a pattern recalling the starry sky of the frescoes by Giotto in the Scrovegni Chapel.

All vehicles are accessible to disabled passengers and the floor height of the vehicles is equal to the height of the platforms at stops, creating a single level without steps. 75% of the total surface of the STE vehicles is glazed. The nominal supply voltage is 750 V.

STE vehicles can only be used on infrastructure built with Translohr technology.

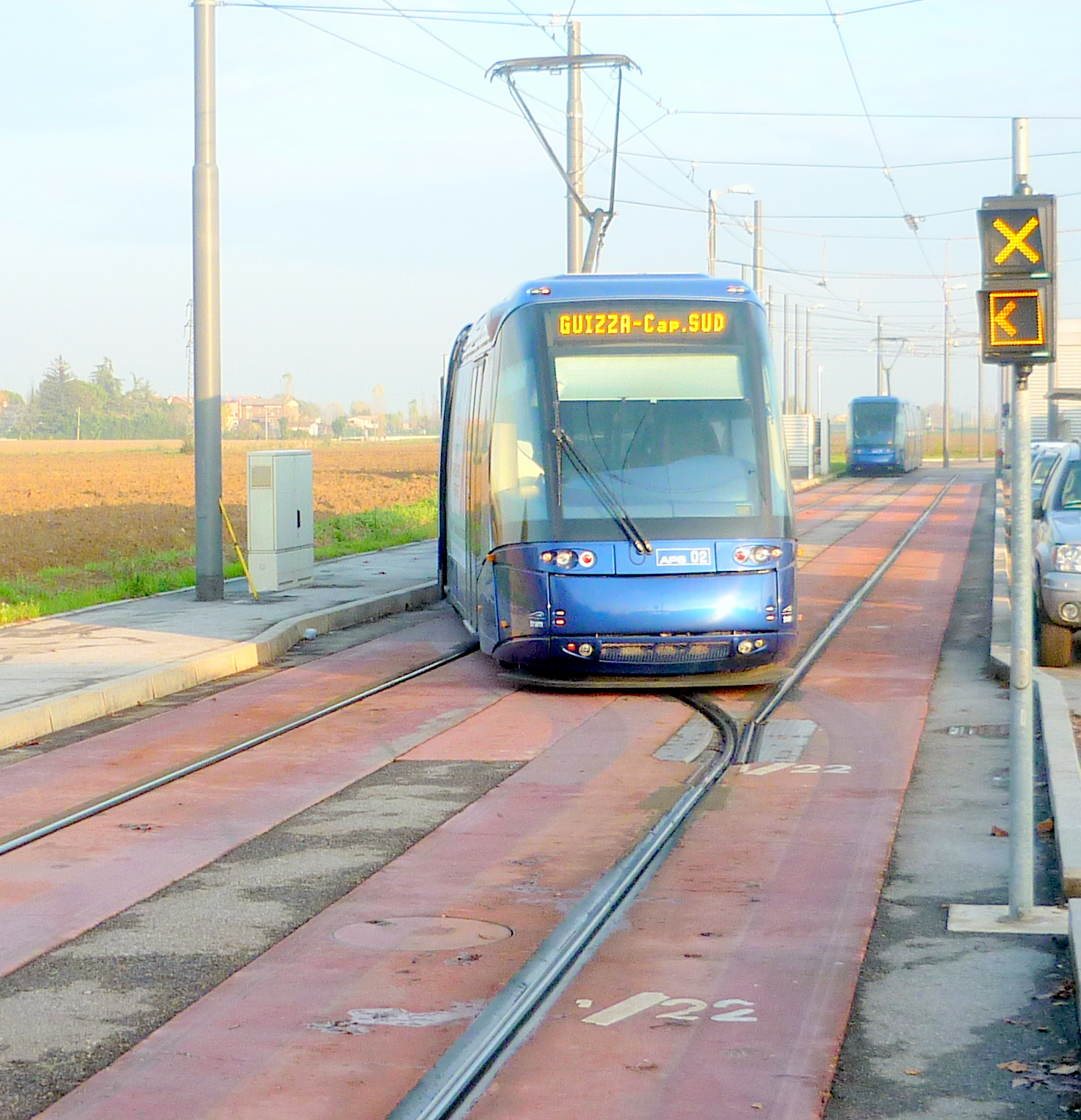
Tram maneuvering in the southern depot

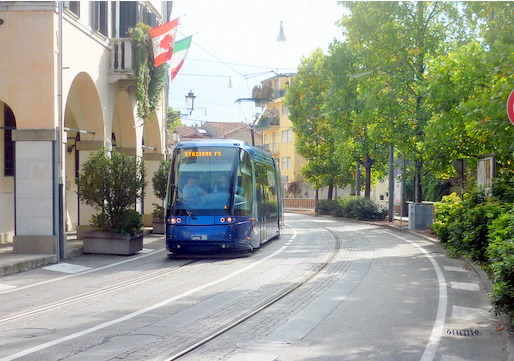
Translohr between Santo and Tito Livio stops

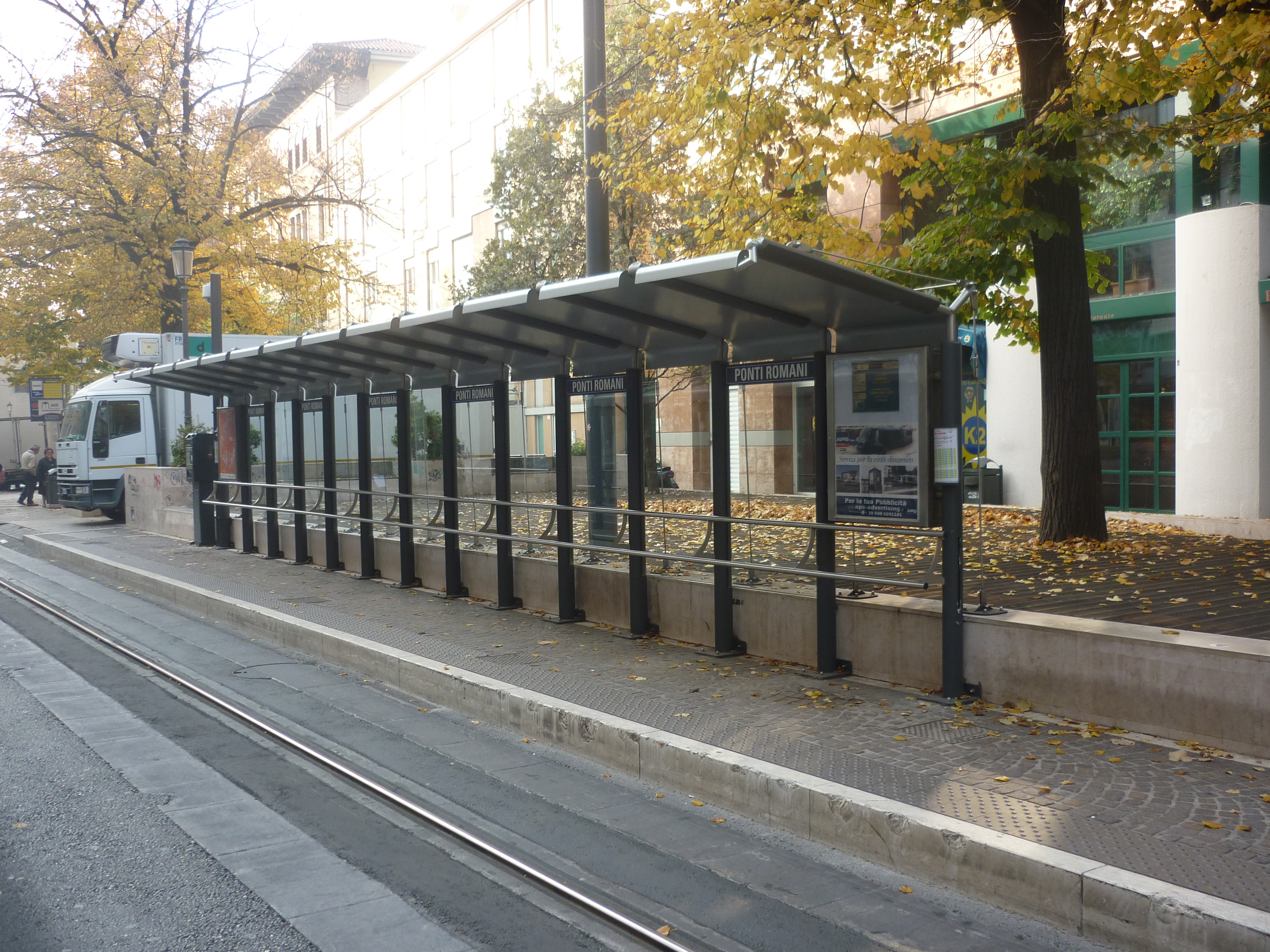
Citydesign shelters installed at every stop

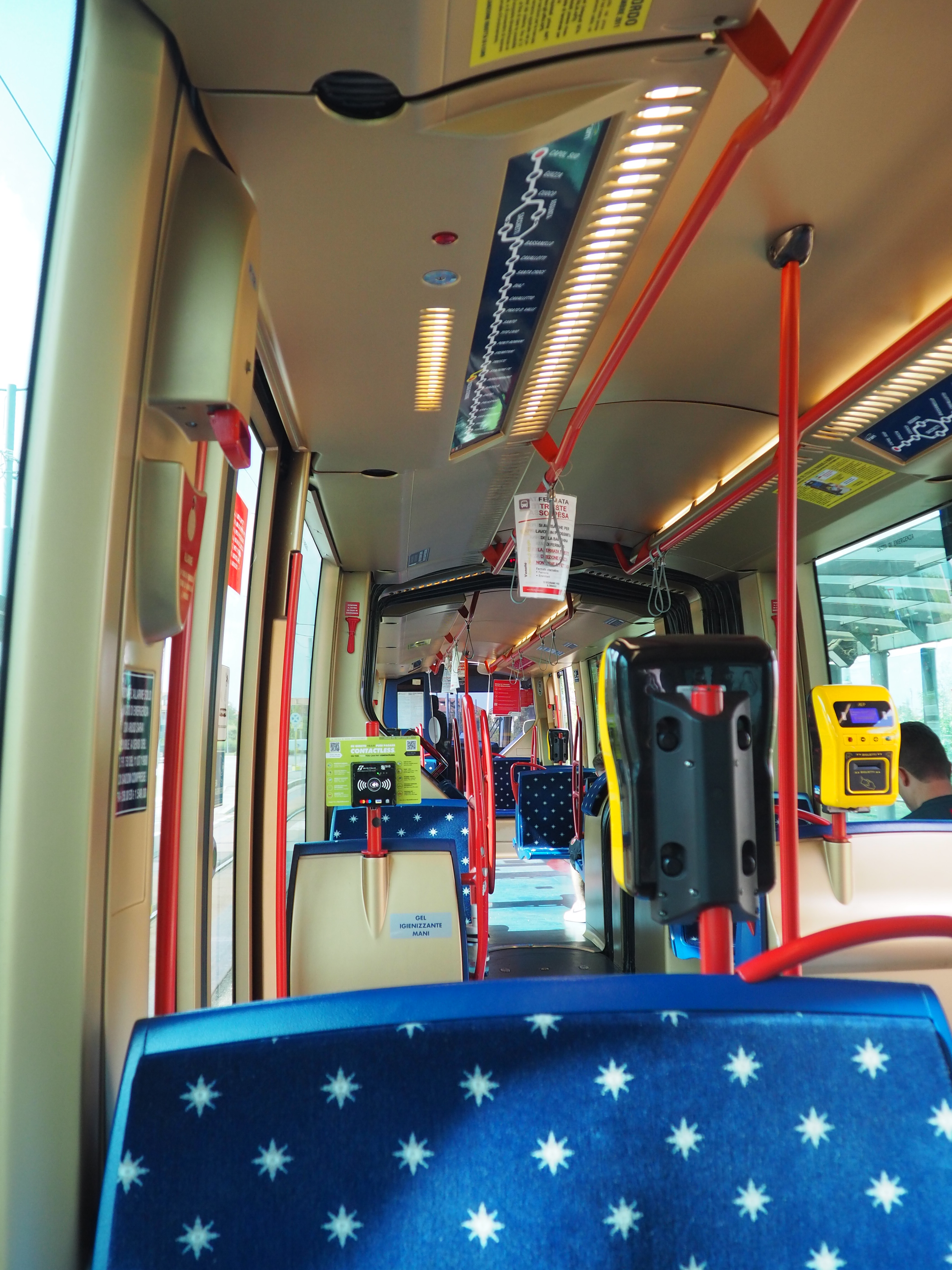
Interior

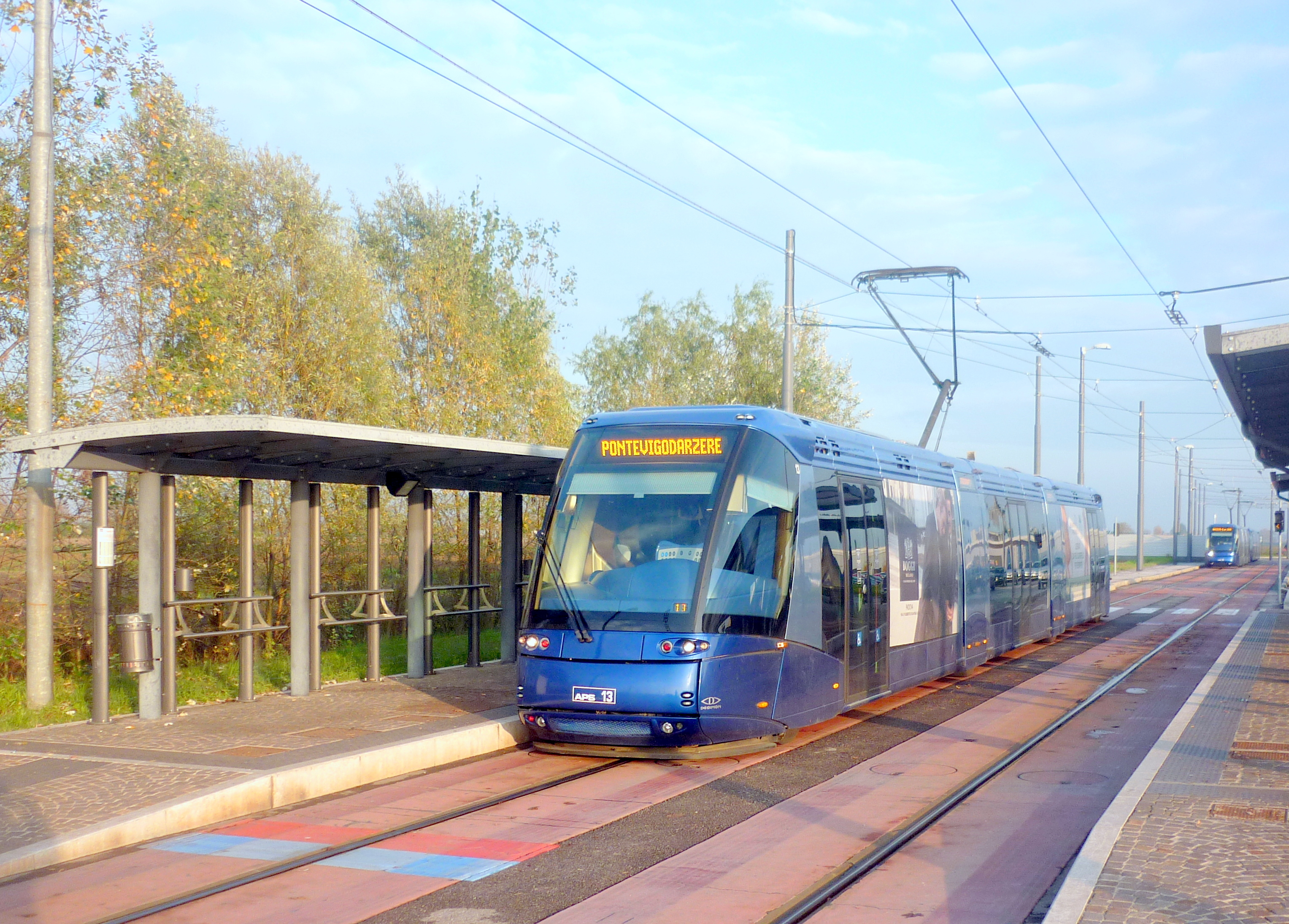
Tram leaving the southern terminus

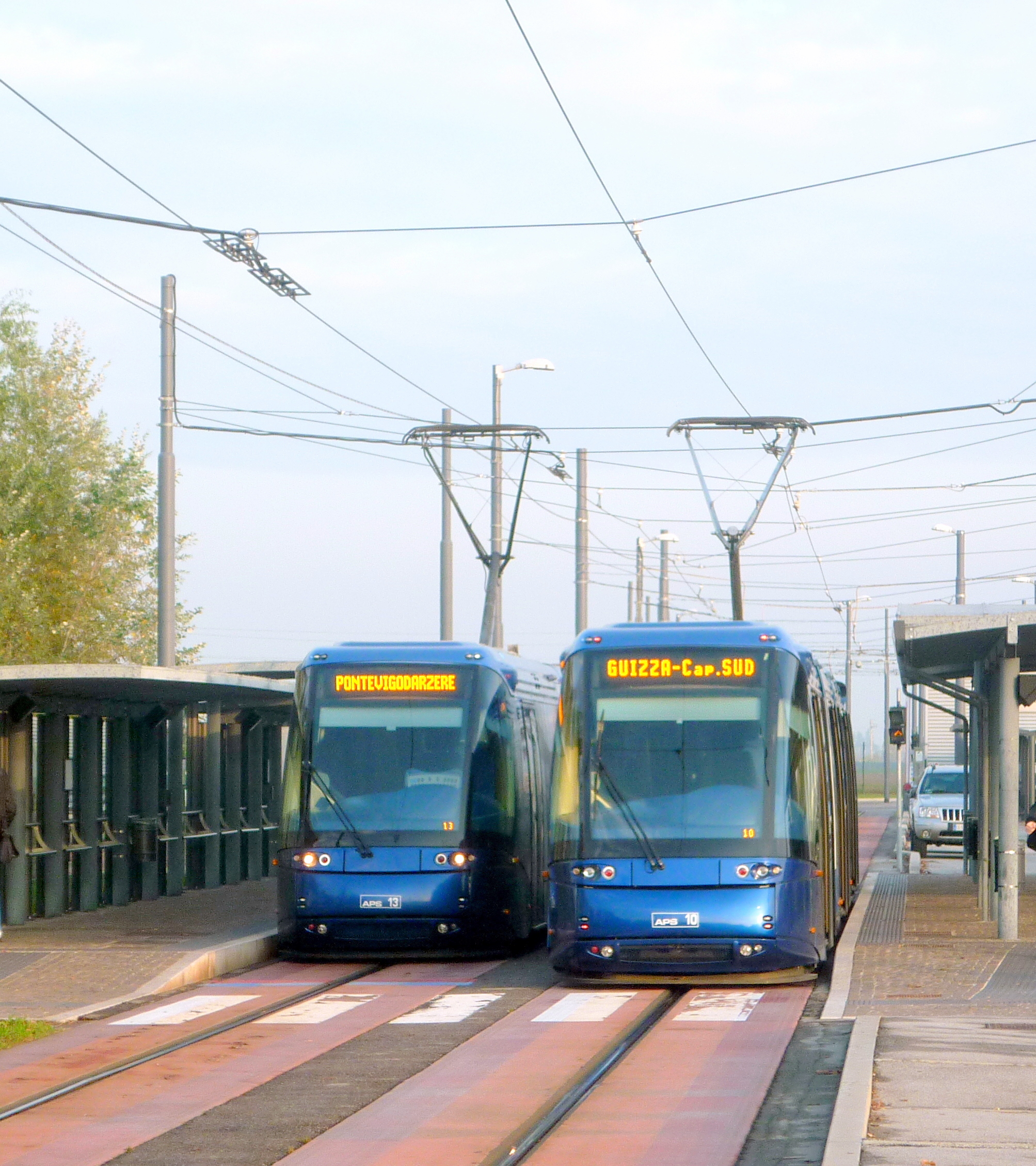
Tram leaving (at left) and arriving (to the right) at the southern terminus.

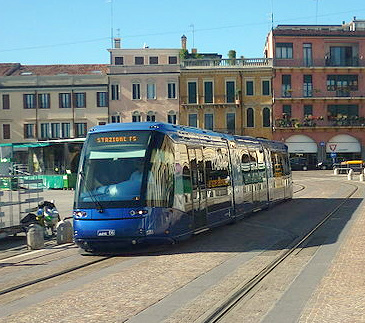
The Translohr on the square without overhead lines

== See also ==
- List of rubber-tyred tram systems
- Translohr
- Trams in Venice
