= Clermont-Ferrand tramway =

Tramway in Clermont-Ferrand, France

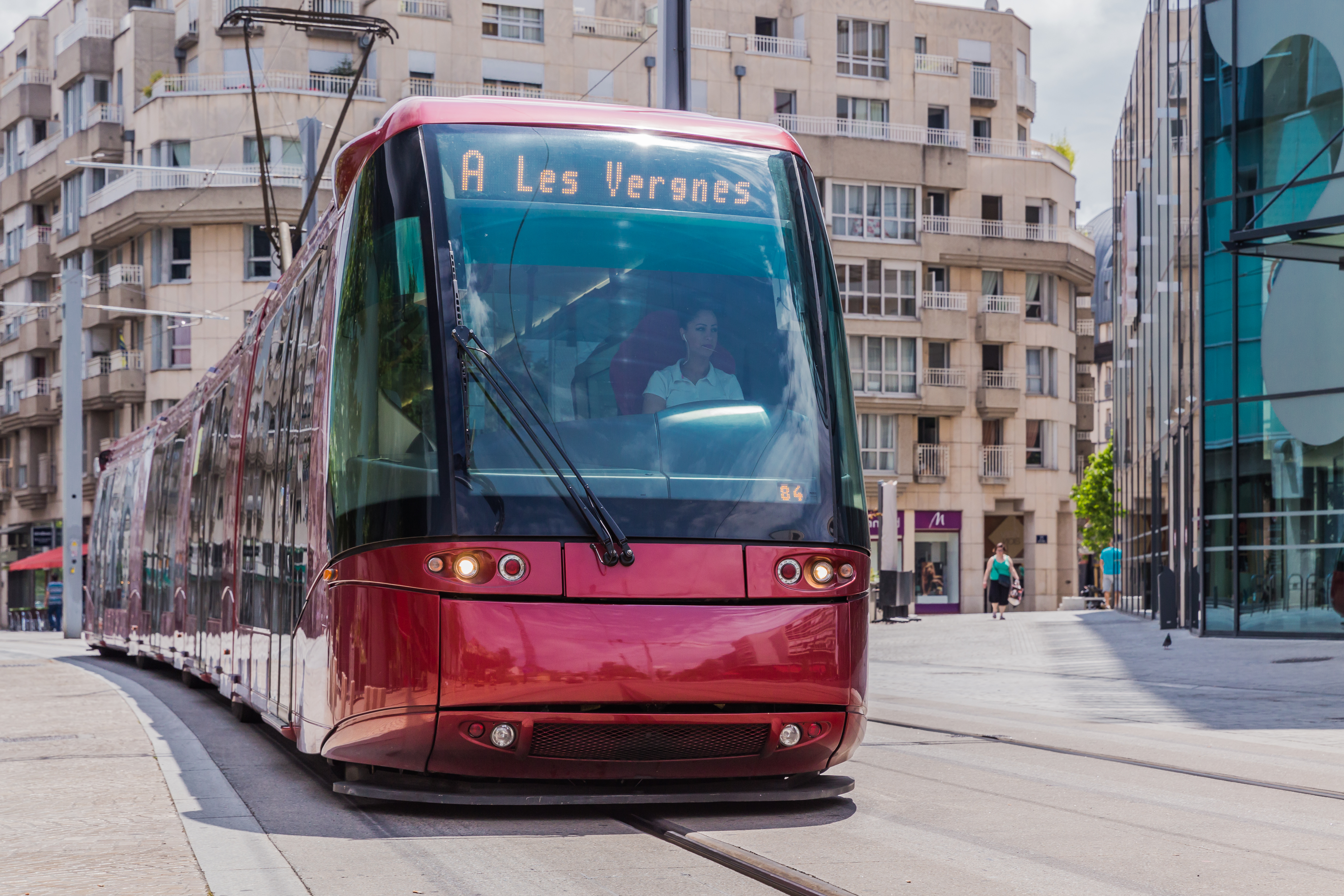

Overview
- Native name: Tramway de Clermont-Ferrand
- Owner: SMTC of Clermont-Ferrand
- Locale: Clermont-Ferrand and Aubière, Auvergne-Rhône-Alpes, France
- Transit type: Translohr
- Number of lines: 1
- Number of stations: 34
- Annual ridership: 17,400,000 (2017)
- Website: t2c

Operation
- Began operation: 13 November 2006
- Operator: T2C
- Number of vehicles: 30

Technical
- System length: 15.7 km (9.8 mi)
- Track gauge: none, central guide rail
- Electrification: 750 V DC Overhead wires
System map

The Clermont-Ferrand tramway (French: Tramway de Clermont-Ferrand) is a transit system located in the city of Clermont-Ferrand in the Auvergne-Rhône-Alpes region of France. It is a Translohr system, meaning it is guided by a single rail and powered by electricity from overhead wires.

This guided bus system comprises just one line, called Line A, that serves 34 stations and runs on 15.7 kilometres (9.8 mi) of double track length. However, there have been numerous plans for extension of the line, and for the system to expand to include other lines, B and C.

Clermont-Ferrand constructed its first tram system in 1890, but in 1956 the tramway was decommissioned in favor of new bus routes. The current Translohr system officially opened in 2006.

== History ==
=== First tramway (1890–1956) ===
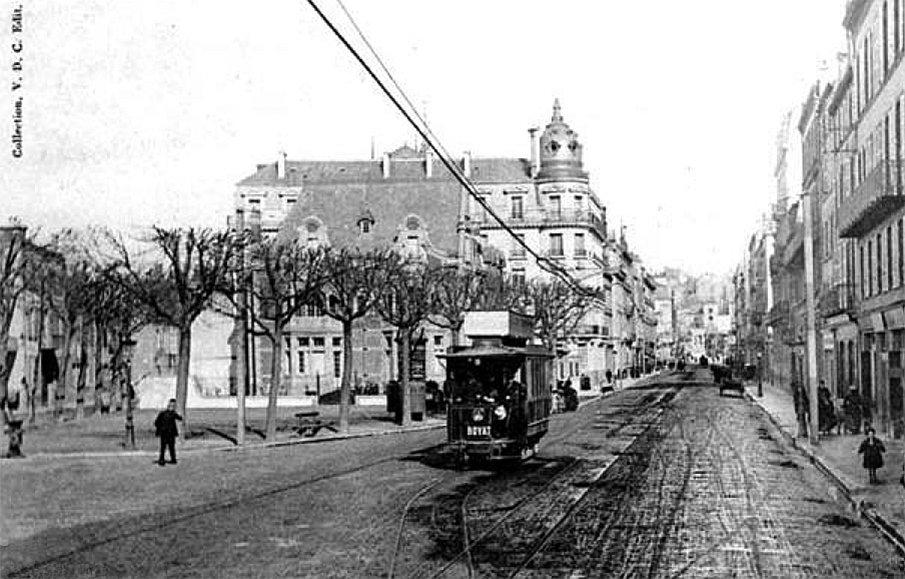
Clermont-Ferrand tram in the early 1900s.

The first tramline in Clermont-Ferrand was put into service on 7 January 1890 by the Electric Tramway Company of Clermont Ferrand. The Clermont-Ferrand tramway distinguished itself from other systems as it was the first to use electricity in France.

The first 1,000 mm (3 ft 3 3/8 in) metre gauge tram track ran from Montferrand to Jaude. Shortly after this, an extension was opened to Royat on l'Avenue des Thermes. A total of 22 two-axle tramcars were put into service. In 1902, a section between Jaude and Place Delille, via Place Gaillard, opened. In 1913, a link to Cermont-Ferrand Train Station via Salins, and a short section between Place Gaillard et Fontgiève, were put into service.

Before the First World War, the Beaumont line was extended to Ceyrat. In 1928, a link to Aubière was created, following the route of Line 3 on Avenue Léon Blum.

At the end of the Second World War, the tram suffered many setbacks. As cars began to become more popular, the government did not focus any effort on public transportation systems, but instead on the expansion of roads and highways. The tramlines were gradually replaced by buses.

The last tram in Clermont-Ferrand ran on 17 March 1956. After this, public transportation in the city was solely by bus. In many places, the rails were paved over to make way for cars.

=== Modern tramway (2006–present) ===
In the 1970s, concern over the consequences of automobile use increased. In the 1983 Elections, a tramway was proposed by Socialist mayor Roger Quilliot in his re-election campaign.

However, the tram project was only seriously considered starting in 1990. The development of the system was given to SOFRETU (now Systra), which proposed the building of two tramlines: one north–south line (which would eventually become Line A), and an east–west line. In 1996, bids were solicited for the rolling stock for the tramway. Alstom proposed that Alstom Citadis trams be used for the system, and Alstom Citadis trams were bought for Line A on 14 October 1996. Thus, the first tramway followed SOFRETU's proposal, which corresponded to the present day Line A.

However, due to pressure from the Chamber of Commerce and industries in Clermont-Ferrand (mostly Michelin), this initial tramway project was halted. A revised project was developed in 2000.

New bids were solicited in 2002, and the only bidders were: Irisbus with their Civis trolleybus, Bombardier with their TVR rail transit system, and Lohr Industrie with their Translohr system. The contract was ultimately won by Lohr Industrie due to pressure from the government and from Michelin.

Following a derailment during the testing phase, the inauguration of the first section was delayed by a month, but finally opened in November 2006. The rest of the line opened on 27 August 2007.

The line was closed for seven weeks in 2013 to renovate many stations platforms due to their deterioration.

== Extensions ==
In 2011, an extension of Line A to Vergnes was initiated. Work began in December 2011 and took almost 2 years.

On 14 December 2013, the 2-kilometre (1.2 mi) extension of Line A from Champratel to Vergnes opened to the public. This extension was part of the "Reorganization of Les Verges Region" program, mainly to ease access to the Stade Gabriel Montpied.

== Stations ==
Currently, there are 34 stations on the Clermont-Ferrand Tramway. They are located in both Clermont-Ferrand and Aubière communes.

=== List of Stations ===
Station Name	Commune	Transfer to T2C Bus Lines
Les Vergnes	Clermont-Ferrand	none
Stade Gabriel Montpied	Clermont-Ferrand	3 and 21
La Plaine	Clermont-Ferrand	21
Champratel	Clermont-Ferrand	24
Croix de Neyrat	Clermont-Ferrand	21 and 24
Hauts de Chanturgue	Clermont-Ferrand	21 and 24
Collège Albert Camus	Clermont-Ferrand	none
Les Vignes	Clermont-Ferrand	3 and 31
Lycée Ambroise Brugière	Clermont-Ferrand	none
Les Pistes	Clermont-Ferrand	33
Musée d'art Roger Quilliot	Clermont-Ferrand	20, 21 and 33
Montferrand — La Fontaine	Clermont-Ferrand	none
Gravière	Clermont-Ferrand	none
Stade Marcel Michelin	Clermont-Ferrand	B
1er Mai	Clermont-Ferrand	3 and 4
Les Carmes	Clermont-Ferrand	27
Delille Montlosier	Clermont-Ferrand	3, 4, 7, 12, 27, 35 and 36
Hôtel de Ville	Clermont-Ferrand	none
Gaillard	Clermont-Ferrand	5 and 32
Jaude	Clermont-Ferrand	B, C, 9 and 10
Lagarlaye	Clermont-Ferrand	none
Maison de la Culture	Clermont-Ferrand	4, 8 and 13
Universités	Clermont-Ferrand	3 and Gare de la Rotonde
Saint-Jacques — Dolet	Clermont-Ferrand	none
CHU Gabriel Montpied	Clermont-Ferrand	8
Saint-Jacques — Loucheur	Clermont-Ferrand	8
Léon Blum	Clermont-Ferrand	none
La Chaux	Aubière	none
Cézeaux — Pellez	Aubière	none
Campus	Aubière	none
Margeride	Aubière	13
Fontaine du Bac	Clermont-Ferrand	2
Lycée Lafayette	Clermont-Ferrand	C and 22
La Pardieu Gare	Clermont-Ferrand	Gare de Clermont-La Pardieu, 9 (on Sundays and public holidays)

== Rolling stock ==
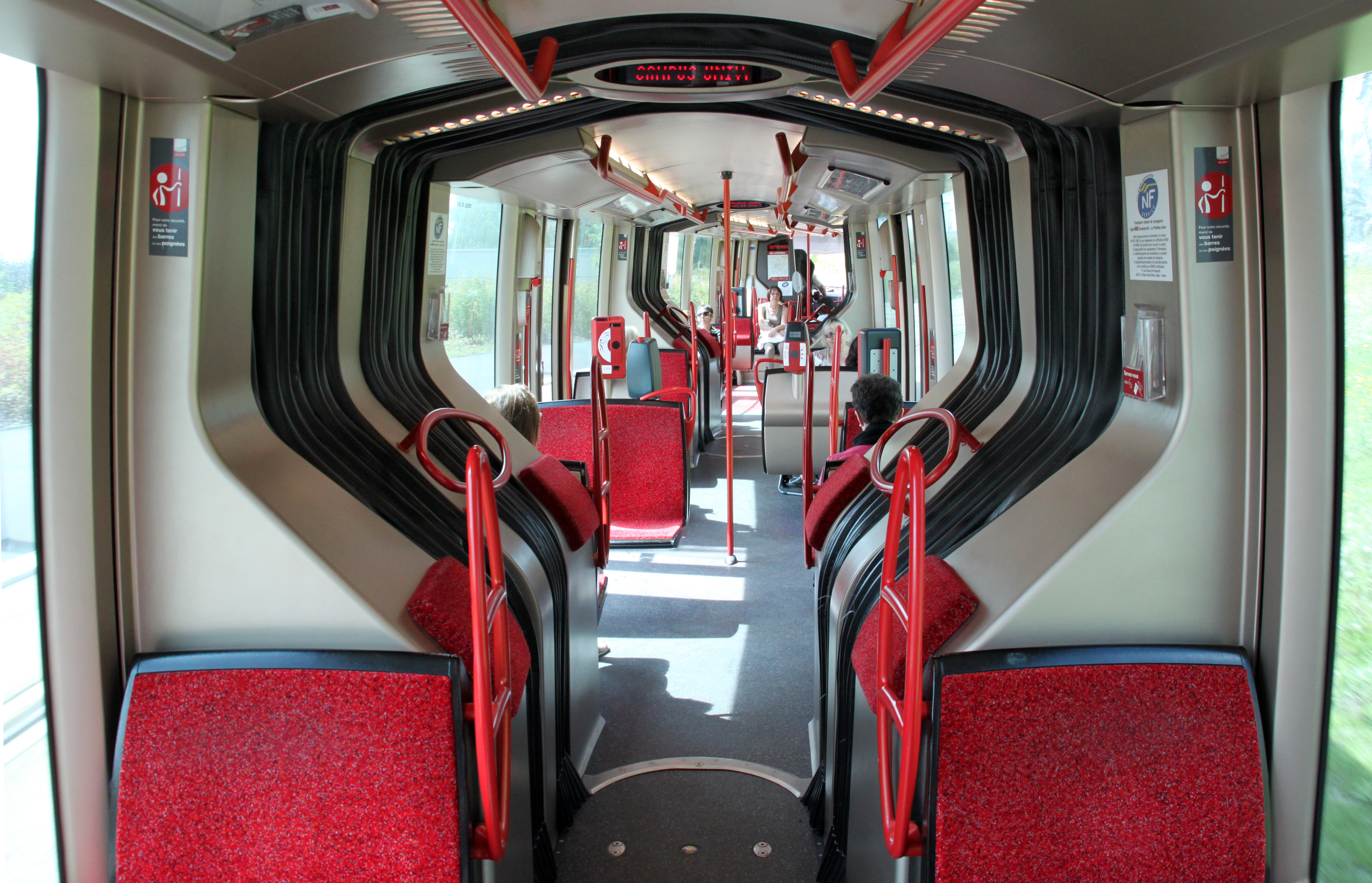
Interior view of the tram.

The tramway of Clermont-Ferrand uses Translohr technology. The initial fleet was 26 trains, but in September 2019, the fleet was expanded to 30 trains. Every STE 4 model consists of 4 cars, for a length of 32 metres (105 ft).

Every train has a maximum capacity of 238 people with around 40 sitting. Six trains were priced at approximately 14 million euros.

== Accidents ==
On 26 December 2009, around 7:10, a train crashed at La Pardieu station. No one was injured in the incident, but the train was completely destroyed. According to the French Bureau of Ground Transport Accident Investigation, the direct cause of the accident is due to the blocking of a brake because of the general corrosion of its actuating pad system, which neither the design or manufacturer allowed to seal. The spread of the fire resulted from the short distance and lack of firewall between the brakes and the bellows. Also, the investigators believed that materials not meeting French standards were present due to international imports.

On 10 January 2011, a tram derailed between the Carmes and Delille stations, injuring one person. According to a report by the French Bureau of Ground Transport Accident Investigation, the direct cause of the accident of this Translohr was the detachment of the guide rail from the wheel under the conductor's cabin. This report from the bureau put the Translohr system itself into question. The deterioration of the tire rollers accumulated at the guide roller and brought these rollers out of the guide rail, removing the guide and driving the vehicle into the wall. Also, the bureau underlined the number of accidents linked to the presence of certain foreign elements. The bureau demanded that Lohr Industrie replaced the parts with ones that would be more durable.

On 9 November 2011, a train derailed because the conductor of the train ignored a signal indicating that the track was not switched properly.

== Gallery ==
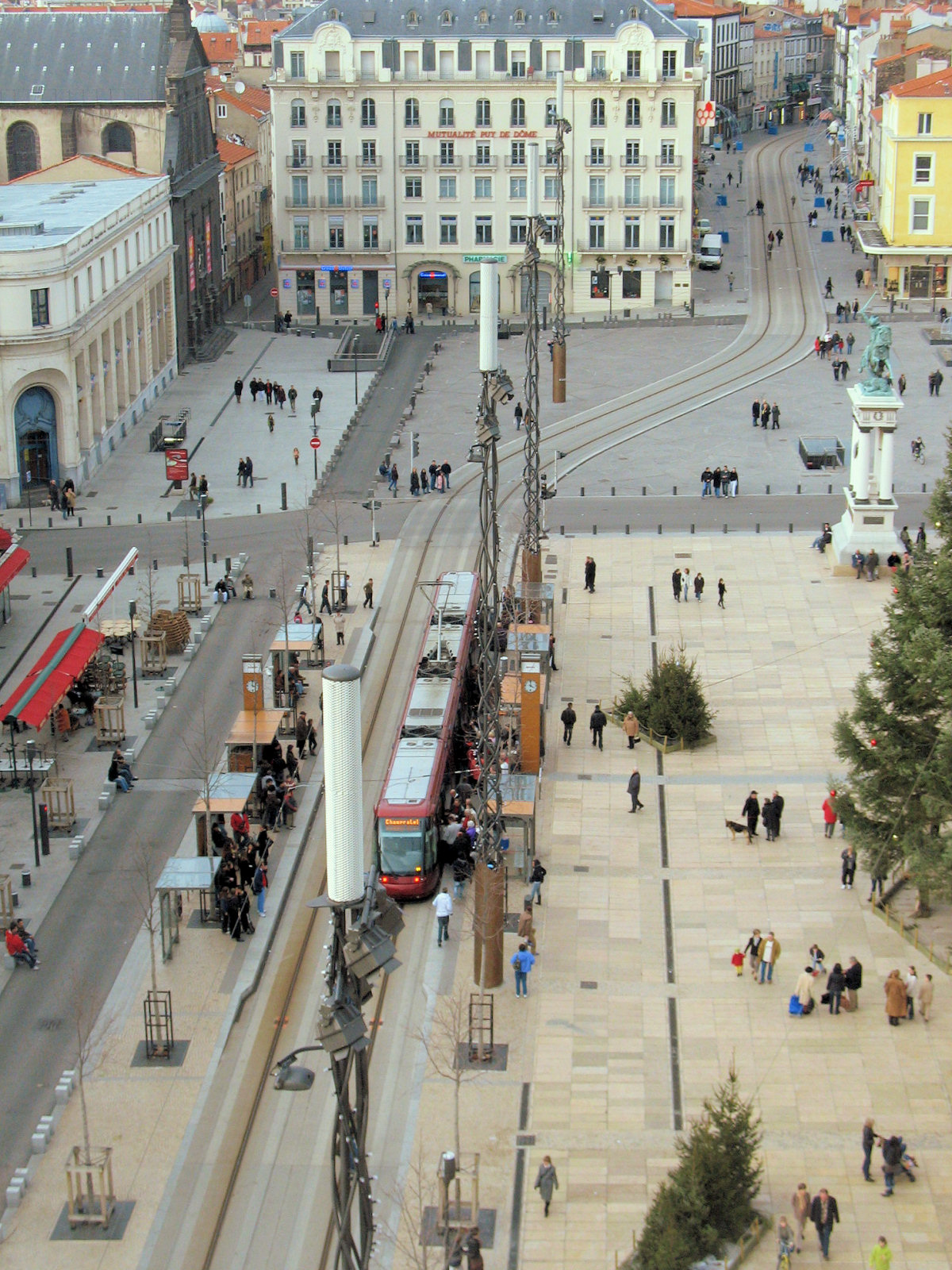
Tram at Place de Jaude

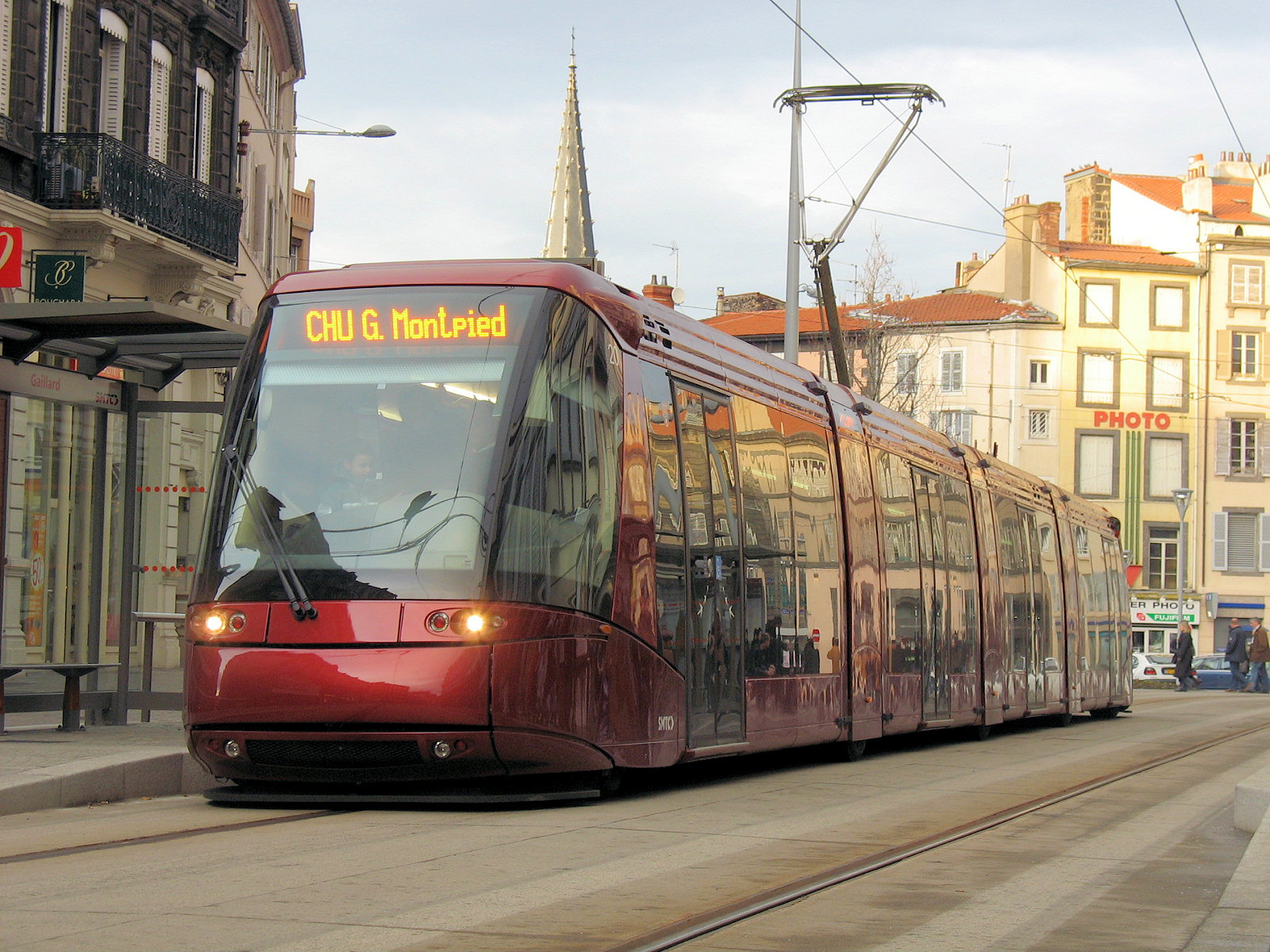
Tram on Avenue des Etats Unis

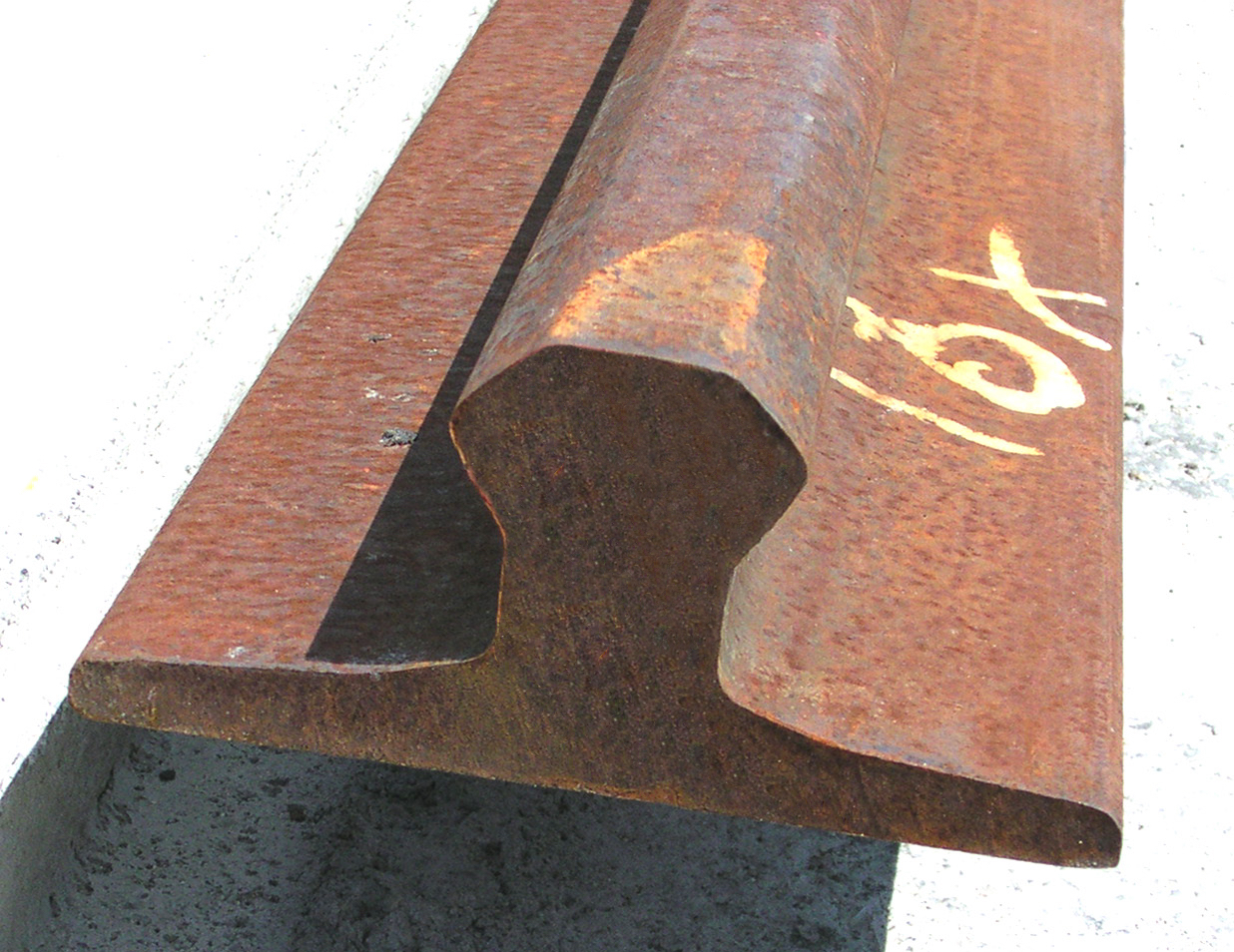
Portion of guide rail prior to installation

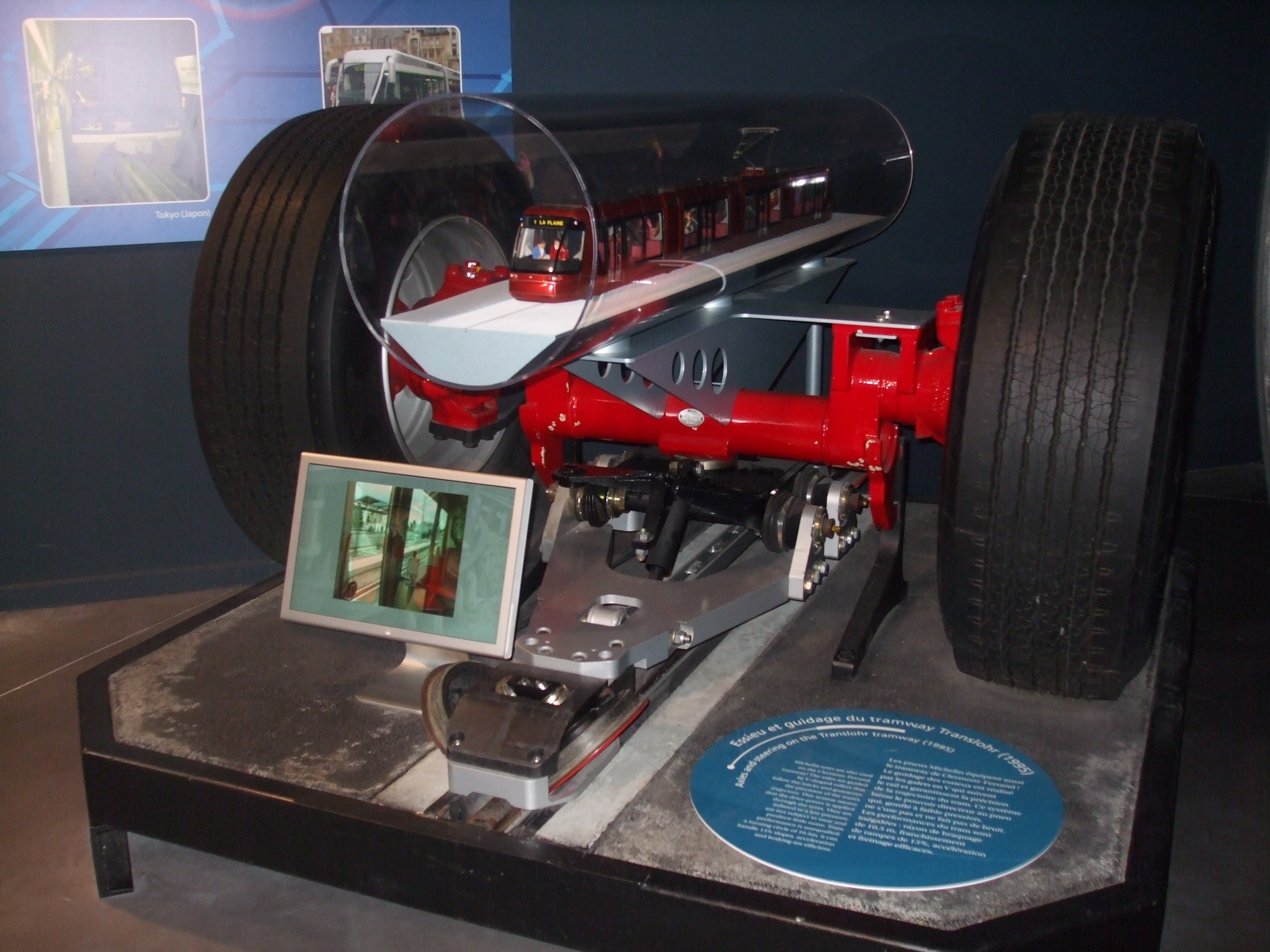
Tires made by Michelin used on the vehicles.

== See also ==
- List of tram and light rail transit systems
- List of rubber-tyred tram systems
