= Trams in Mestre =

Tramway created in 2010

Coordinates: 45°29′36″N 12°14′47″E

Venice Tramway
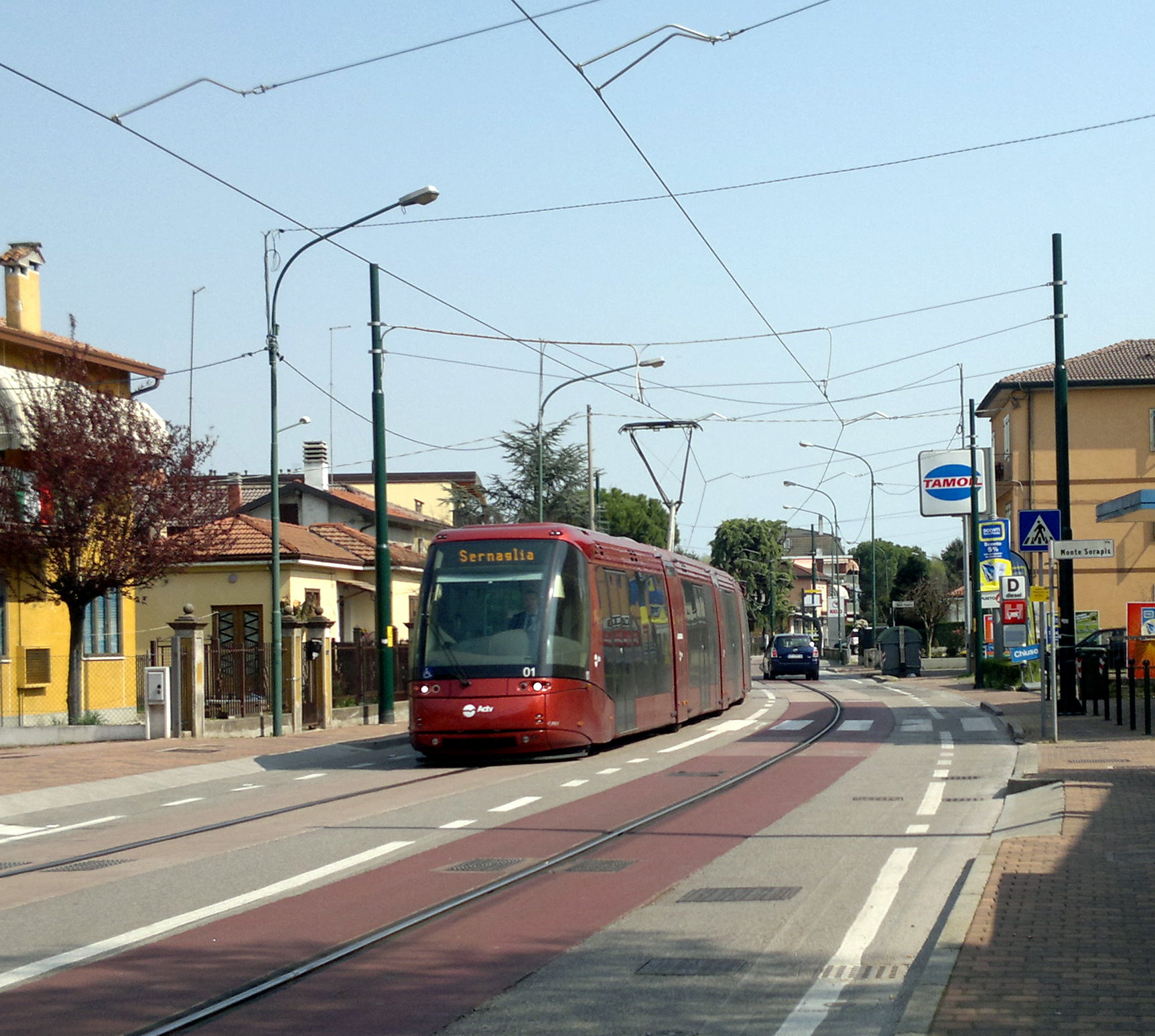
- Auto 01 as Line T2 on Via San Doná heading to Sernaglia (April 2011)

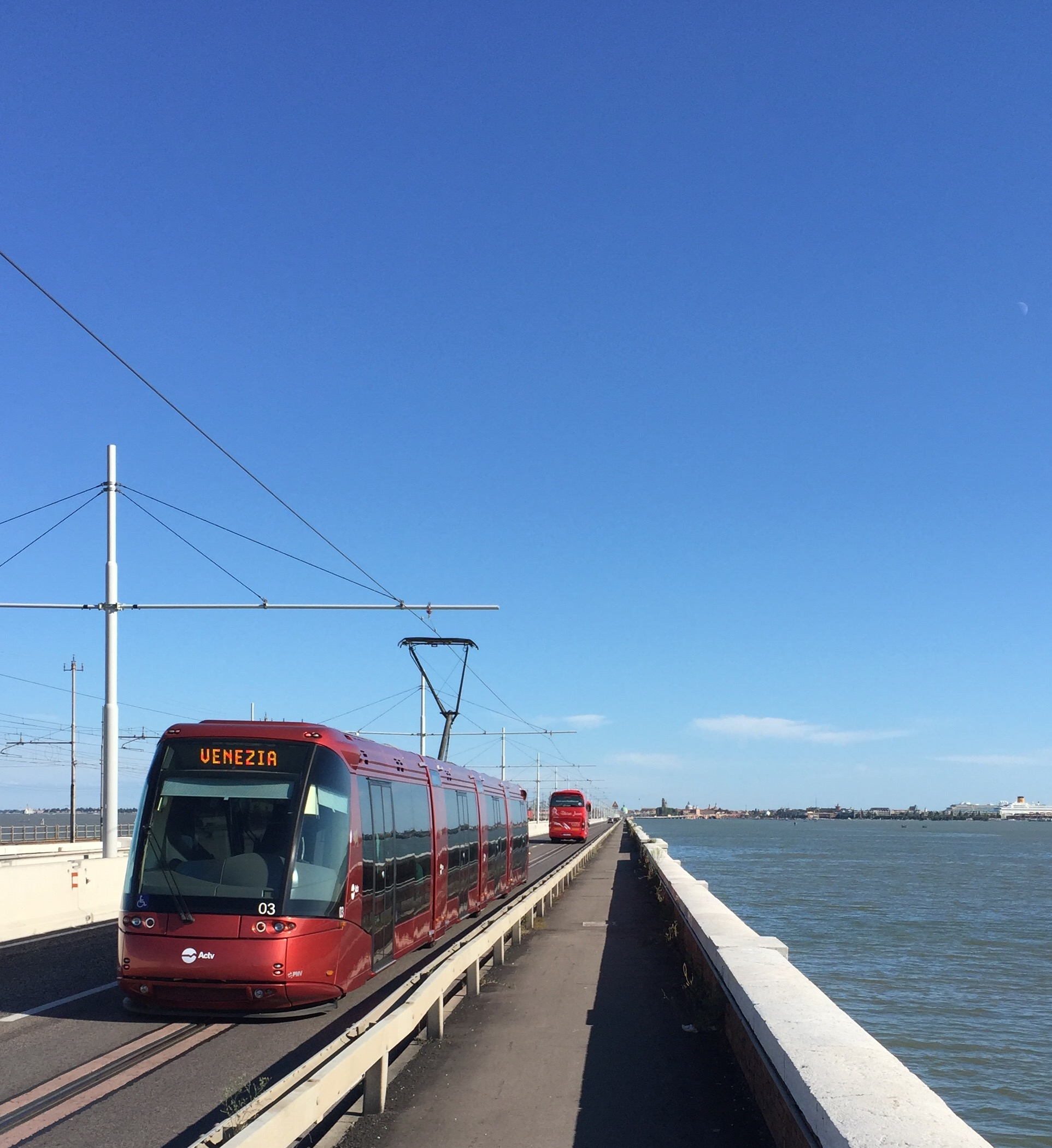
- Line T1 on Ponte della Libertà

Overview
- Native name: Tranvia di Venezia
- Owner: Actv
- Locale: Venice, Veneto, Italy
- Transit type: Translohr
- Number of lines: 2
- Line number: T1, T2
- Number of stations: 37
- Daily ridership: 44,000

Operation
- Began operation: December 19, 2010
- Number of vehicles: 20 Translohr STE4
- Headway: 10 min

Technical
- System length: 18.9 km (11.7 mi)
- Track gauge: None, central guide rail
- Electrification: 750 V DC Overhead lines
- Top speed: 70 km/h (43 mph)
System map

The Venice Tramway (Italian: Tranvia di Venezia) is a rubber-tired tramway (or guided bus) system forming part of the public transport system in Venice, Favaro Veneto, Mestre and Marghera, three boroughs of the city and comune of Venice, northeast Italy.

Since 2015, the tramway is connected to Piazzale Roma (the main bus station) in Venice.

The tramway uses Translohr rubber-tyred trams.

== History ==
Trams returned to Mestre on 20 December 2010. Mestre's earlier urban and suburban tramway network had been disposed of more than half a century earlier, following the closure of its last line in 1941.

== Lines ==
=== T1 ===
Line T1 Monte Celo – Venezia-Piazzale Roma

Overview
- Native name: Linea T1
- Status: active
- Termini: Monte Celo; Venezia-Piazzale Roma
- Stations: 23

Service
- Operator: Actv

History
- Monte Celo (Favaro Veneto) – Sernaglia: December 19, 2010
- Mestre Centro – Venezia–Piazzale Roma: September 15, 2015

Technical
- Line length: 13.45 km (8.36 mi)

=== T2 ===
Line T2 Mestre Centro – Salamonio

Overview
- Native name: Linea T2
- Status: active
- Termini: Mestre Centro; Salamonio
- Stations: 14

Service
- Operator: Actv

History
- Sernaglia – Stazione FS: September 22, 2011
- Stazione FS – Salamonio (Marghera): September 12, 2014

Technical
- Line length: 5.4 km (3.4 mi)

== See also ==
- List of rubber-tyred tram systems
- List of town tramway systems in Italy
- History of rail transport in Italy
- Rail transport in Italy
