= Translohr =

Rubber-tyred tramway technology

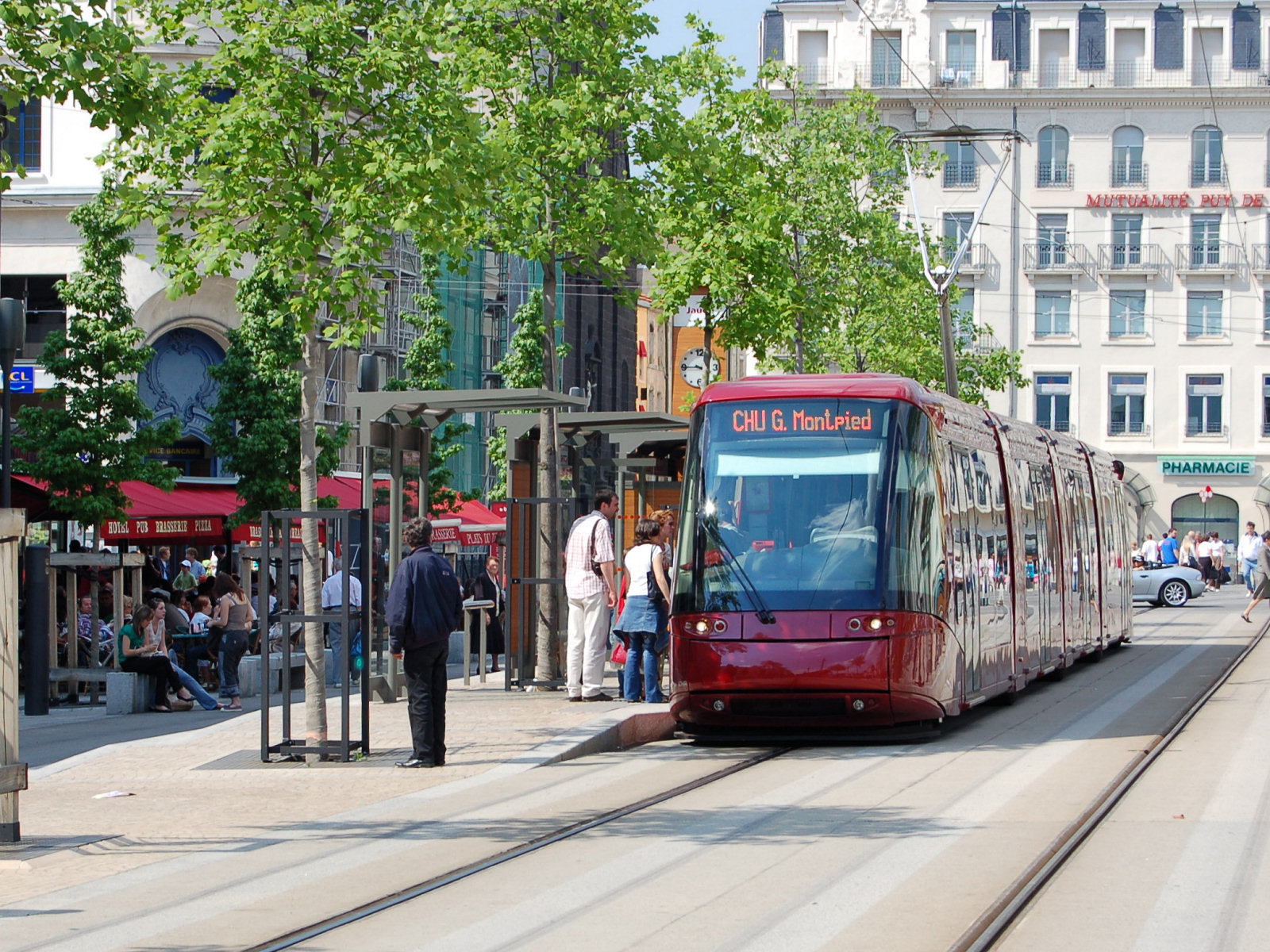
A Translohr vehicle of the Clermont Ferrand tramway.

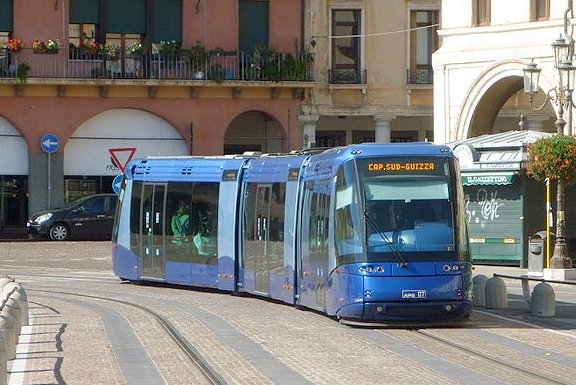
A Translohr vehicle in Padua.

Translohr is the name of a rubber-tyred tramway technology, originally developed by Lohr Industrie of France and now run by a consortium of Alstom Transport and Fonds stratégique d'investissement (FSI) as newTL, which took over from Lohr in 2012. It is used in Paris, Clermont-Ferrand, France; Medellín, Colombia; and Venice-Mestre and Padua in Italy. In June 2012, Alstom Group and the Strategic Investment Fund acquired Translohr for €35 million.

== Description ==
The Translohr system is more like a tram or light railway than a bus or trolleybus. Unlike other guided bus systems, including the similar but incompatible Guided Light Transit system developed by Bombardier Transportation, Translohr cars permanently follow guide rails that they cannot divert from, like traditional steel-wheeled rail vehicles.

The guide rail automatically guides the vehicle, with a driver who stops and starts, accelerating and braking when needed. Power is provided by overhead wires and collected with a pantograph in the same way as a tram. The vehicle may carry internal battery packs for use on non-electrified sections of the route, like they do in Padua.

There are two main designs for the vehicles: the bi-directional STE series, and the unidirectional SP Prime series. They consist of three to six articulated sections like a conventional tram, with a length from 25 to 46 metres (82 ft 1/4 in to 150 ft 11 in) long and 2.2 metres (7 ft 2 5/8 in) wide. Their net weight is 23–44 tonnes (22.6–43.3 long tons; 25.4–48.5 short tons), depending upon the number of car sections.

As Translohr LRVs cannot run without a guide rail they are not classified as buses. For example, those used on the Clermont-Ferrand network do not need to have license plates.

Translohr technology

Guidance system.
1- Pavement, 2- Gap (empty space), 3- Guide rail, 4- Resin, 5- Flange, 6- Spring, 7- Railway tire

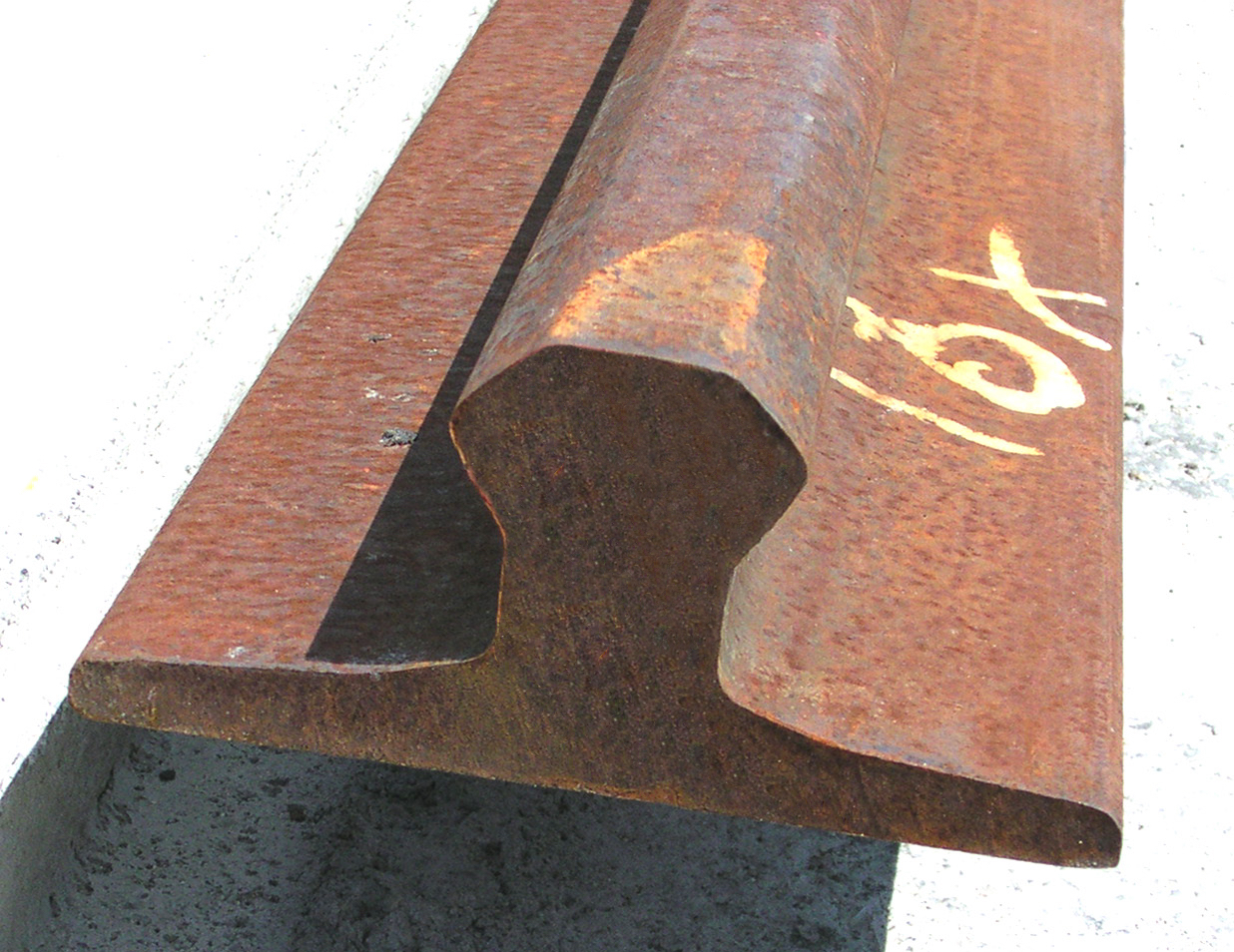
Translohr system guide rail cross-section

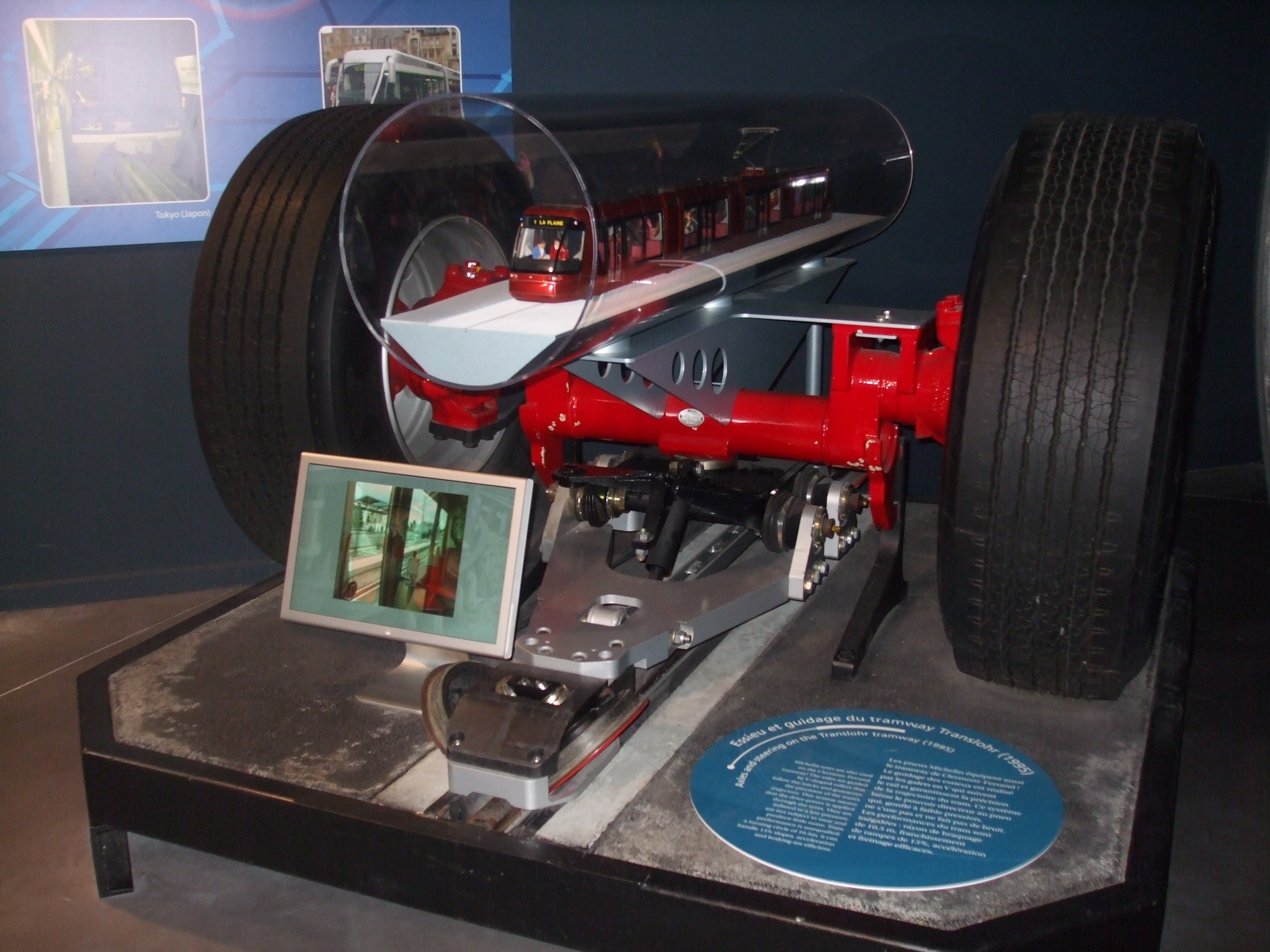
Tires made by Michelin used on translohr vehicles

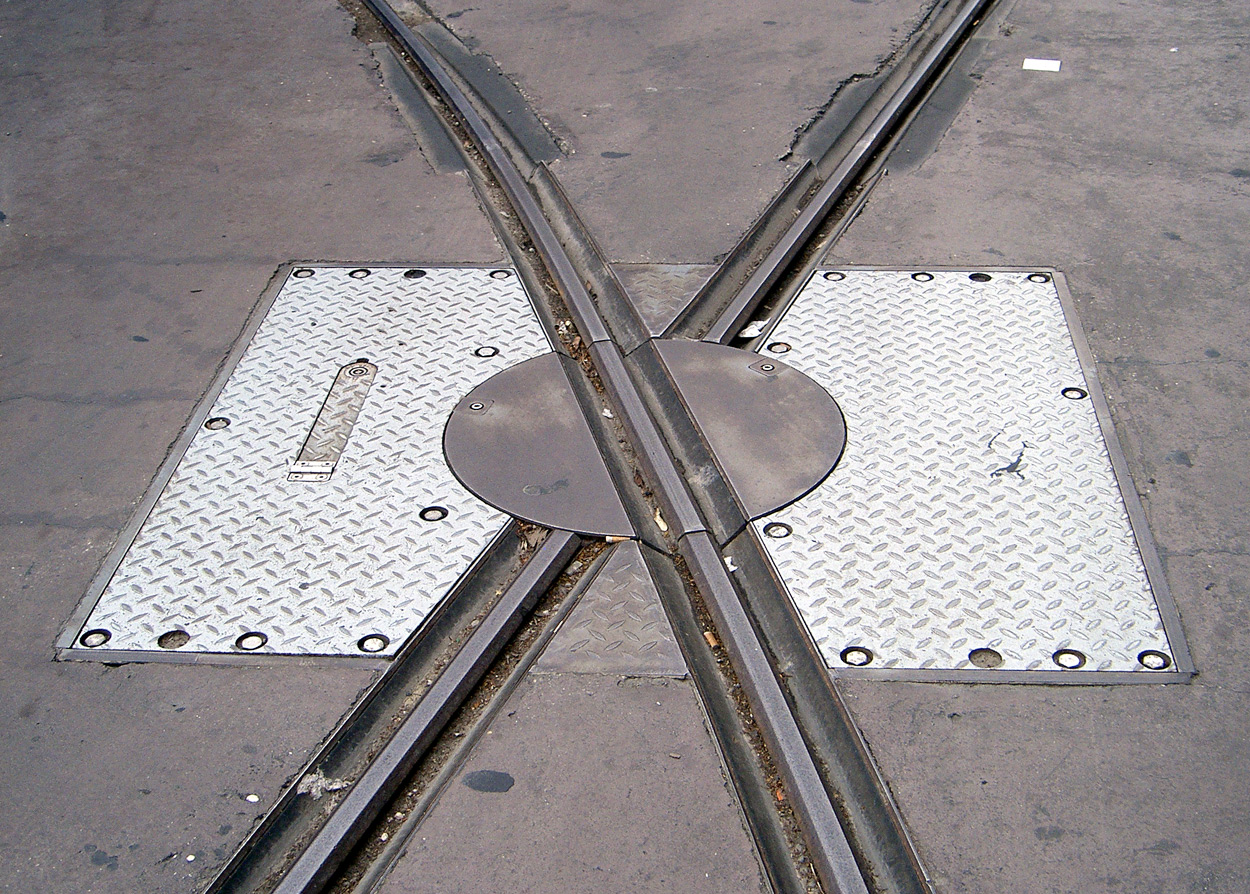
Translohr rail crossing
Translohr switches

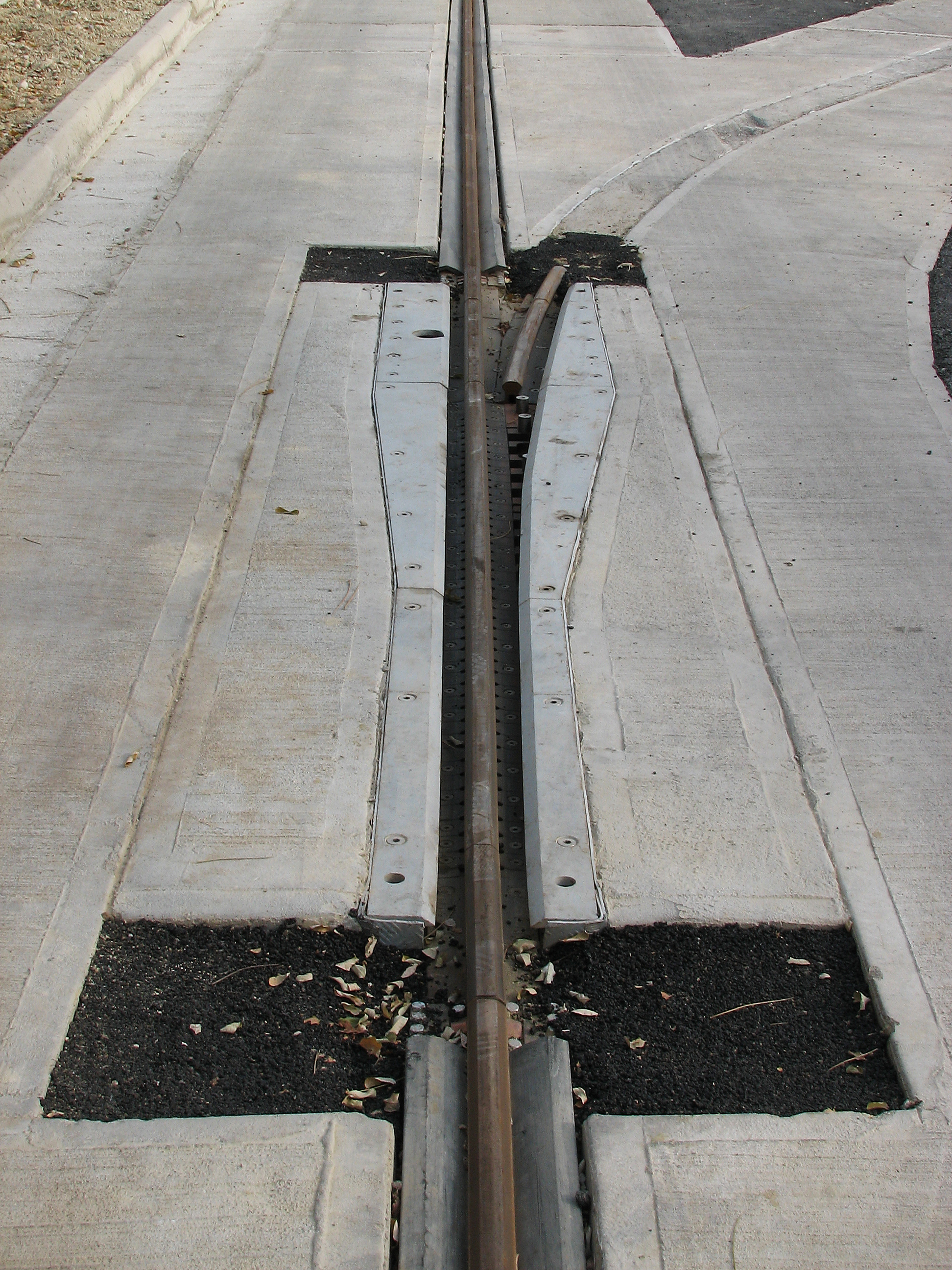
Translohr flexible single rail switch

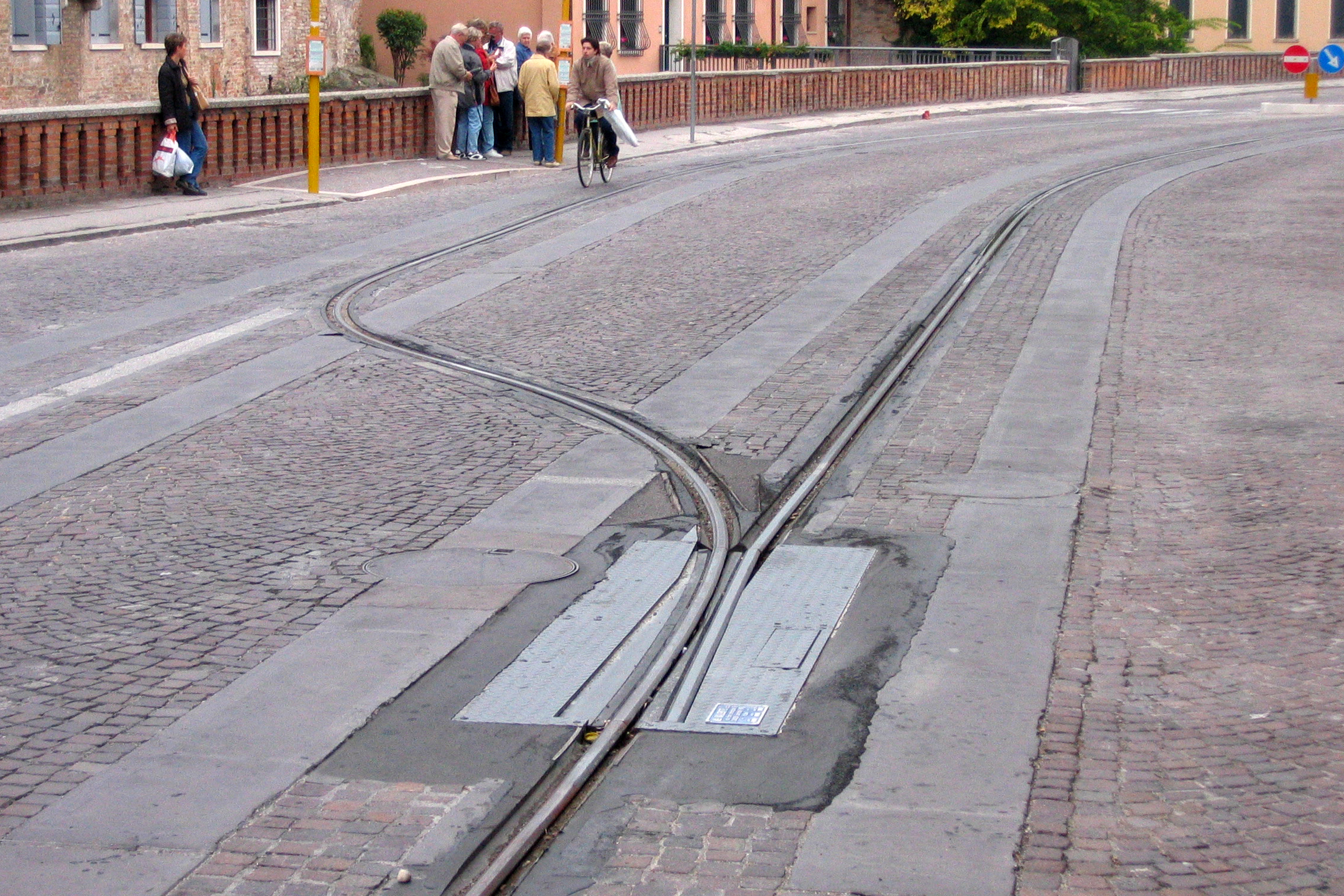
Translohr rigid two-rail switch

== List of translohr systems ==
Country	City	Image	System name	Opening	Closure	Length	Number of stops	Number of vehicles	Vehicle type	Notes
China	Shanghai (Zhangjiang)	Translohr in Shanghai	Zhangjiang Tram	1 July 2009	31 May 2023	9.8 km (6.1 mi)	15	9	STE3	
China	Tianjin (TEDA)	Translohr in Tianjin	TEDA Modern Guided Rail Tram	6 December 2006	1 June 2023	7.86 km (4.9 mi)	14	8	STE3	Also refer to trams in Tianjin.
Colombia	Medellín	Translohr in Medellín	Ayacucho Tram	15 October 2015		4.3 km (2.7 mi)	9	12	STE5	
France	Clermont-Ferrand	Translohr in Clermont Ferrand	Clermont-Ferrand tramway	14 October 2006		15.4 km (9.6 mi)	34	25	STE4	
France	Paris	Translohr on Île de France Tram line 5	Île-de-France tramway Line 5	29 July 2013		6.6 km (4.1 mi)	T5: 16	17	STE3	Lines 5 and 6 of Île-de-France tramway 20.6 km (12.8 mi)
France	Paris	Translohr on Île de France Tram line 6	Île-de-France tramway Line 6	13 December 2014		14 km (8.7 mi)	T6: 21	28	STE6	Lines 5 and 6 of Île-de-France tramway 20.6 km (12.8 mi)
Italy	Padua	Translohr in Padua	Trams in Padua	24 March 2007		10.3 km (6.4 mi)	25	20	STE3	
Italy	Venice (Mestre)	Translohr in Mestre	Trams in Mestre	19 December 2010		18.9 km (11.7 mi)	T1: 23; T2: 14	20	STE4	

== Criticism ==
The 14 km (8.7 mi) Châtillon–Viroflay Line in Paris cost €27.4m per km, including infrastructure, improvements of the right-of-way, and the purchase of 28 STE6 vehicles. In addition, due to the tyres constantly running over the same area of road, there is significant erosion of the roadway; this has already happened with the comparable Bombardier Guided Light Transit system, resulting in extensive repairs at significant cost to the operator. This adds to already high running costs. Providing roll ways, as used by rubber-tyred metros, embedded in the road surface might have been useful. Ride quality is also said to be poor, little better than a bus, due to the four-wheeled design, whereas trams have trucks (bogies) with shock absorbers or springs.

The Tianjin system suffered a derailment on 20 August 2007, three months after its inauguration. There were five derailments on Padua's new installation in 2007 before its inauguration, and one on 22 April 2010 due to a misaligned switch.

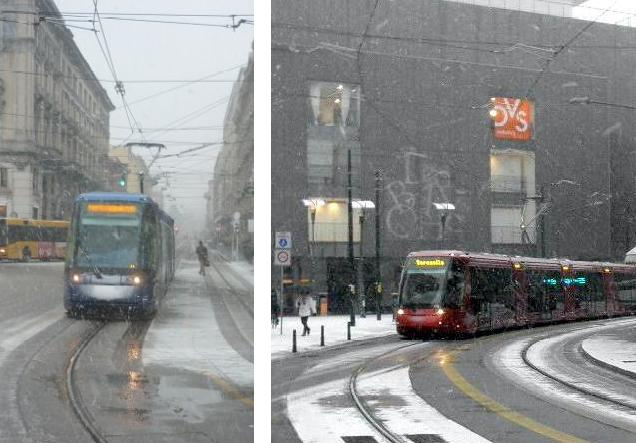
A collage of Translohr vehicles in the snow in Padua (left) and Mestre (right).

Where snowfall is an issue this system may not be practical: since the guide rail forms the return leg of the electrical circuit, accumulation of ice and snow on the rail could cause intermittent power interruptions to the vehicle. Also, as the guide wheels support almost no weight, snow packed into the flangeways or atop the rail by road traffic may cause the wheels to lose grip and become slippery. Since the guide wheels each grip the guide rail at a 45-degree angle and thus are at 90-degree angle to each other, the risk of the guide wheels being lifted completely off the rails is minimal.

Critics of the system also point out that Translohr is a proprietary system subject to vendor lock-in, requiring purchase of any further vehicles from Lohr Industrie. This may no longer be a problem after the patents expire if other manufacturers produce compatible vehicles.

Several lines under construction or already built were eventually abandoned or shut down due to planning changes and operational difficulties. For example, L'Aquila, which started demolition work in 2013; Latina, which purchased new vehicles in 2016 but did not put them into operation because the infrastructure was not completed; Shanghai Zhangjiang Tram, which was demolished shortly after it stopped running on 1 June 2023; and the TEDA Modern Guided Rail Tram shut down the next day on 1 June 2023, and was to be demolished.

== See also ==
- Autonomous Rapid Transit
- Automated guideway transit
- Bi-articulated bus
- Guided bus
- Guided Light Transit
- Personal rapid transit
- Rubber-tyred tram
- Rubber-tyred metro
- Right-of-way
- Tram
- Trolleybus
