= Syndicat mixte des transports en commun =

Syndicat mixte des transports en commun (SMTC) are public transportation schemes in Belfort, Clermont-Ferrand, Grenoble, and Toulouse, in France. The SMTC consists of several entities responsible for the operation of urban transport in Toulouse: the Urban Community of Toulouse Métropole and the Agglomeration Communities of Sicoval and Muret, the Syndicat intercommunal des transports publics de la région toulousaine (SITPRT), and the General Council of Haute-Garonne.
