= Guide rail =

Mechanical device for guiding objects

A guide rail is a device or mechanism to direct products, vehicles or other objects through a channel, conveyor, roadway or rail system.

Several types of guide rails exist and may be associated with:

- Factory or production line conveyors
- Power tools, such as table saws
- Elevator or lift shafts
- Roadways and bridges (in this context sometimes called guardrails)
- A central rail that guides the rubber tired train of a rubber tired metro

== Factory guide rail ==
Most factories use guide rails convey products and component parts along an assembly line. This conveyor system propels products of various sizes, shapes, and dimensions through the factory over the course of their assembly.

== Power tool guide rail ==
Accessory to a power tool, such as a straight, swivel or angle jig for a circular saw, and can also be referred to as a fence. The guide rail system provides an acute method of cutting material.

== Elevator shaft guide rail ==
Guide rails are part of the inner workings of most elevator and lift shafts, functioning as the vertical, internal track. The guide rails are fixed to two sides of the shaft; one guides the elevator car and the other for the counterweight. In tandem, these rails operate both as stabilization within the shaft during routine use and as a safety system in case of emergency stops.

== Roadway guide rail ==
A guide rail is a system designed to guide vehicles back to the roadway and away from potentially hazardous situations. There is no legal distinction between a guide rail and a guard rail. According to the US Federal Highway Administration, the terms guardrail and guiderail are synonymous.

Several types of roadway guide rail exist; all are engineered to guide vehicular traffic on roads or bridges. Such systems include W-beam, box beam, cable, and concrete barrier. Each system is intended to guide vehicles back onto the road as opposed to guard them from going off the road into potential danger.

== Railway guide rail ==
On the Sapporo Municipal Subway a central rail guides the train. The Lille Metro, Translohr and Bombardier Guided Light Transit are also guided by a central guide rail.

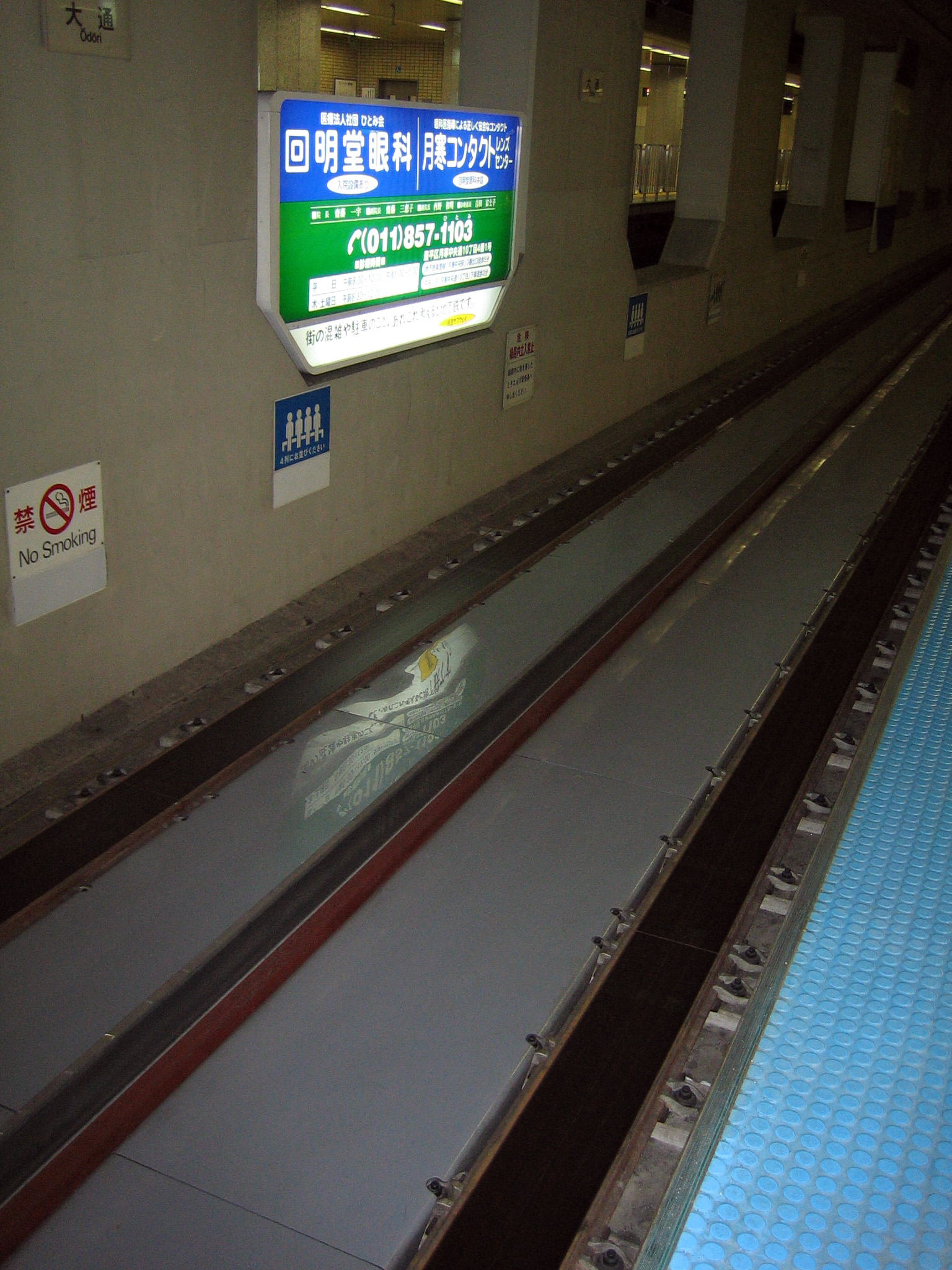
Sapporo Subway guide rail and flat steel roll ways

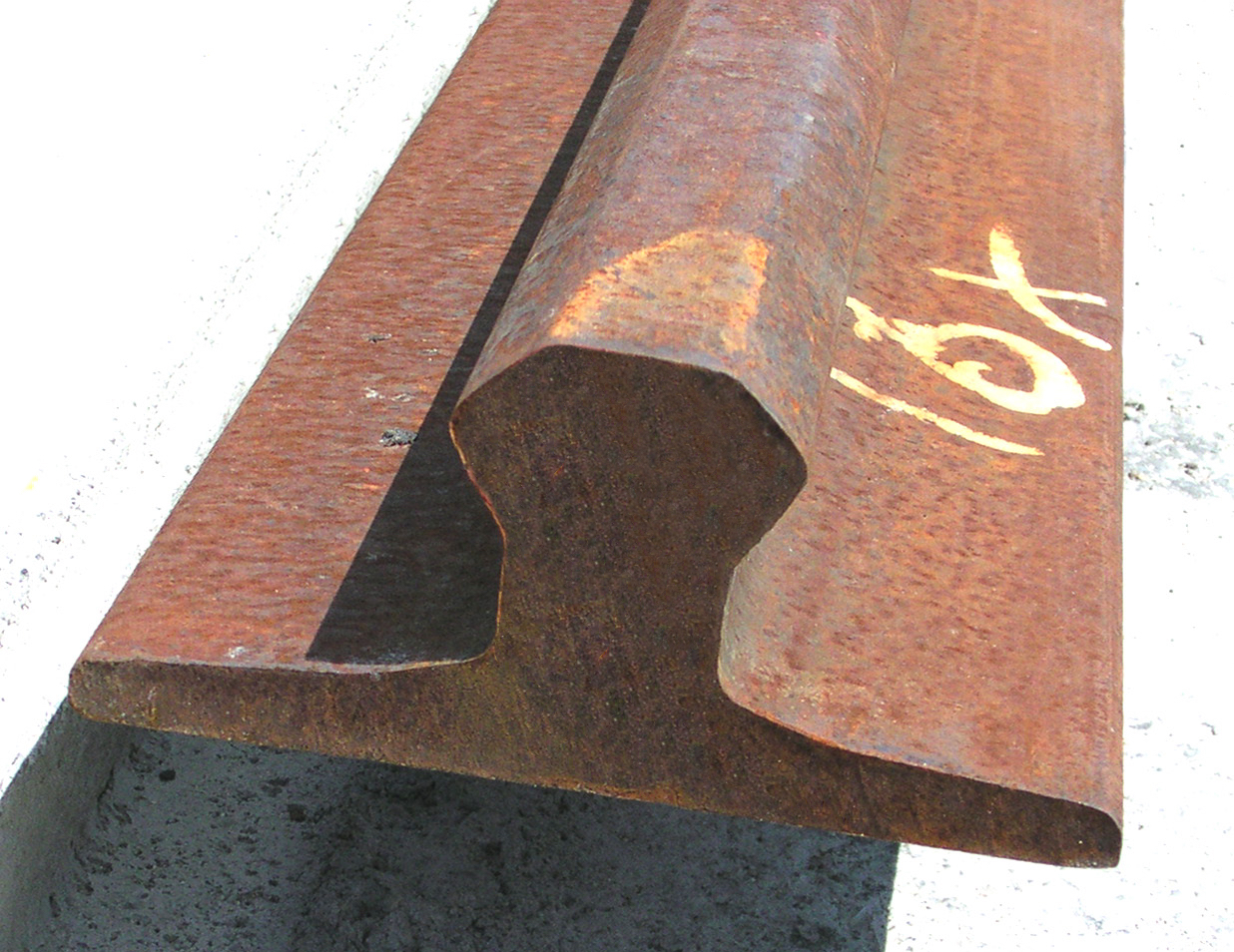
Section of the Translohr guidance rail (during the Clermont-Ferrand installation in 2006)

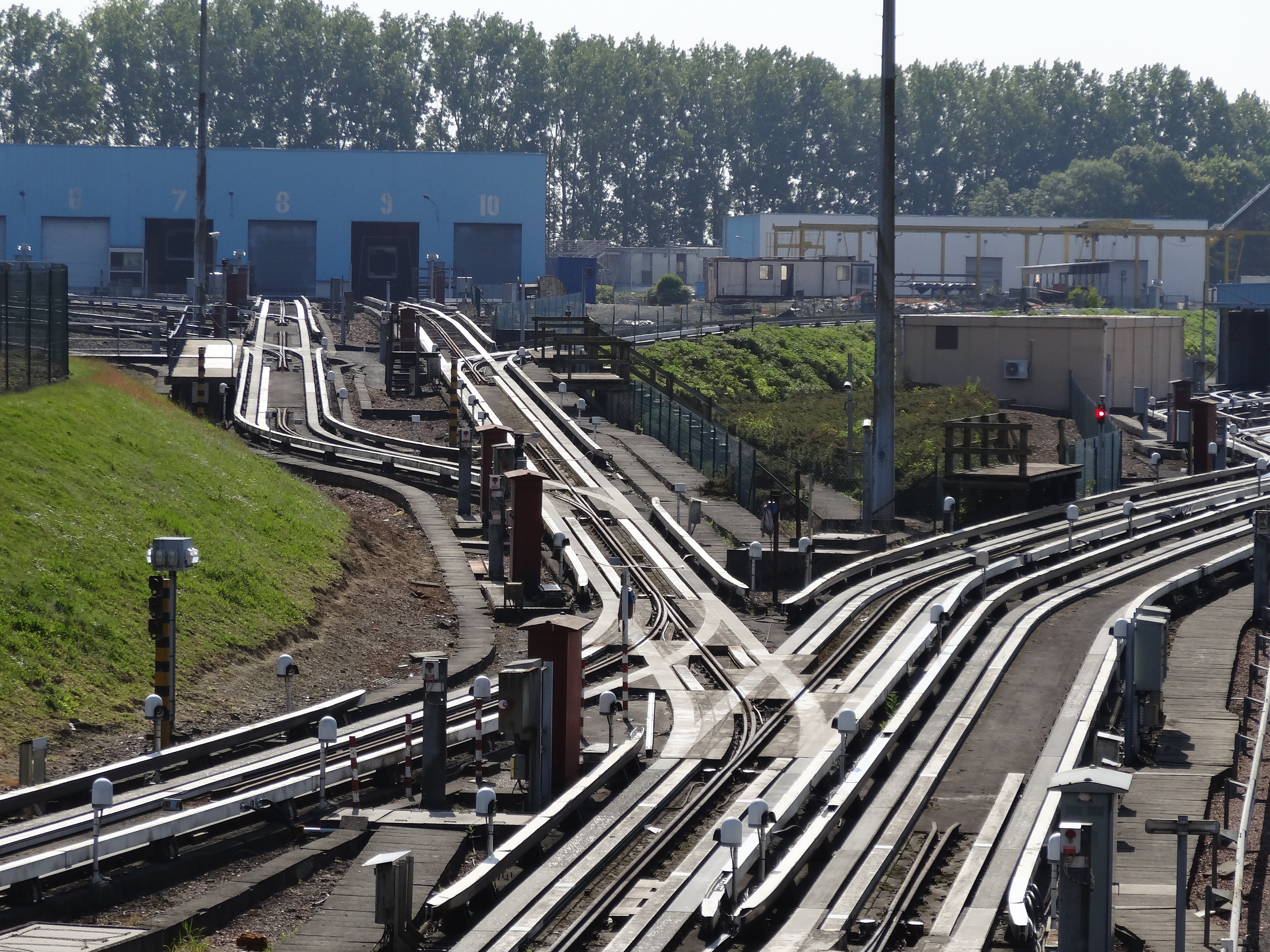
VAL tracks on the Lille Metro showing the center guide rail and rollways.

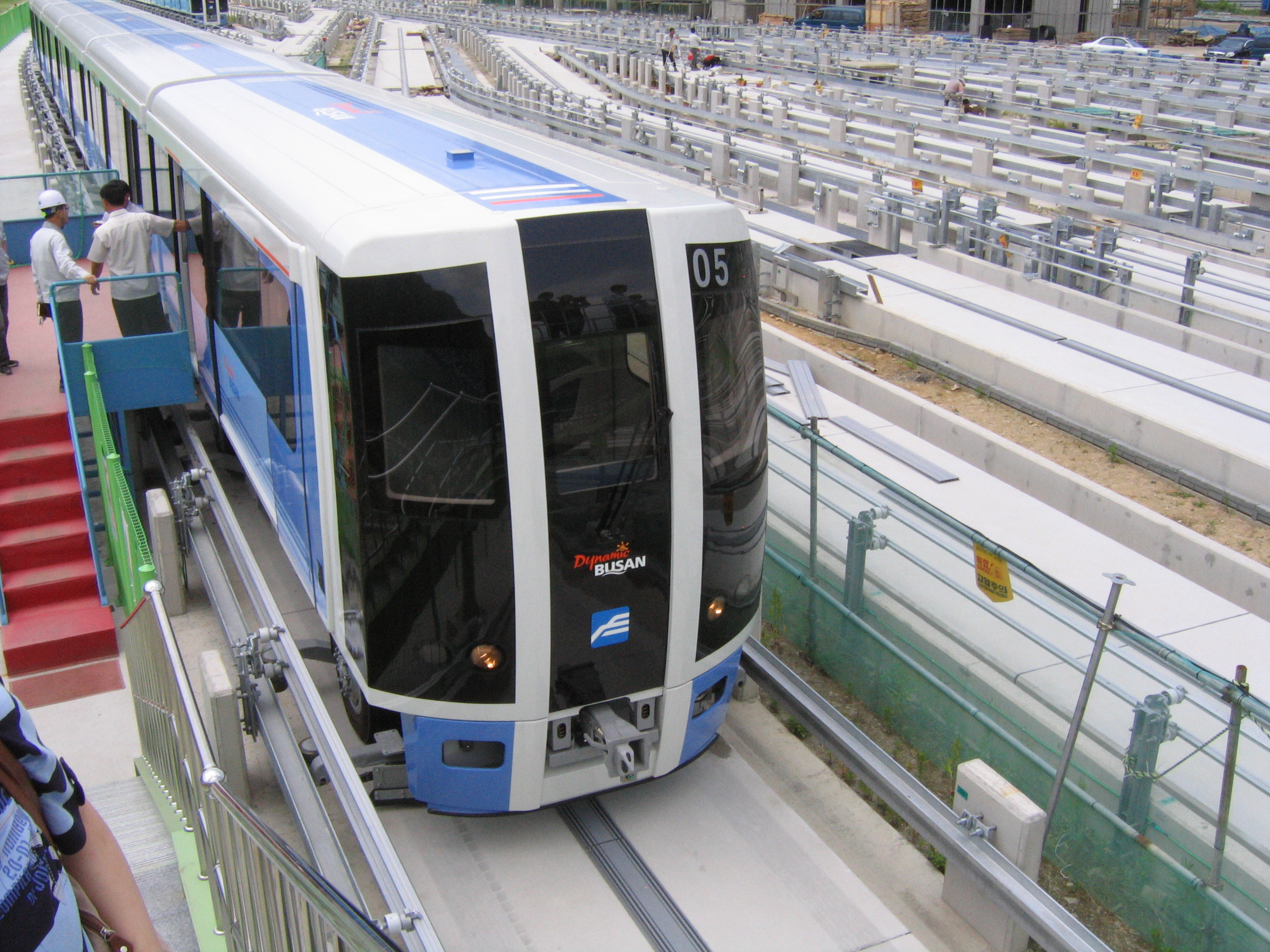
Busan Subway Line 4
Left: diagram of the Translohr guide rail (green) and the tram's guide wheels (red). Right: cross section of the guide rail and guide wheel of the Bombardier's GLT

== See also ==
- Automated guideway transit
- Baluster
- Concrete step barrier
- Crash barrier
- Flangeways
- Guard rail
- Guide bar
- Handrail
- Jersey barrier
- Rubber-tyred metros
- Rubber-tyred trams
