= Rubber-tyred tram =

Development of the guided bus

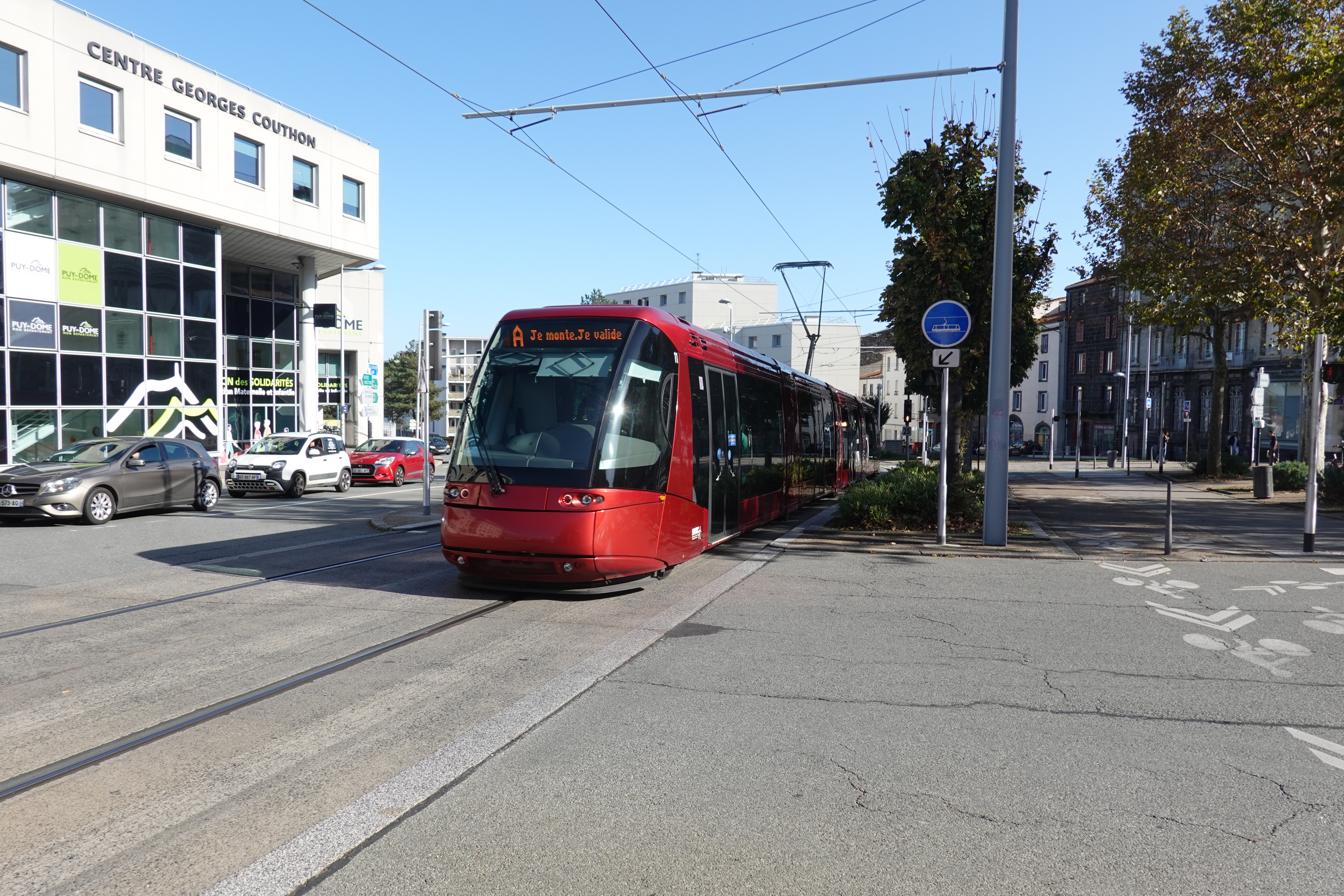
Rubber-tyred tram in Clermont-Ferrand, France

A rubber-tyred tram (also known as tramway on tyres, French: tramway sur pneumatiques or rubber-tired tram, US) is a form of guided buses in which a rubber-tyred vehicle is guided by a fixed rail in the road surface and draws current from overhead electric wires (either via pantograph or trolley poles).

Two incompatible systems using physical guide rails exist: the guided light transit (GLT) designed by Bombardier Transportation, and the translohr from Lohr Industrie (currently made by Alstom and FSI). There are no guide bars at the sides but there is a central guidance rail that differs in design between the systems. In the case of Translohr, this rail is grasped by a pair of metal guide wheels set at 45° to the road and at 90° to each other. In the GLT system, a single double-flanged wheel between the rubber tyres follows the guidance rail. In both cases, the weight of the vehicle is borne by rubber tyres to which the guide wheels are attached, which make contact with the road on concrete roll ways designed to minimise impact on the ground. Power is usually supplied by overhead lines, rechargeable batteries, or internal combustion engines where there are no overhead wires.

== Characteristics ==
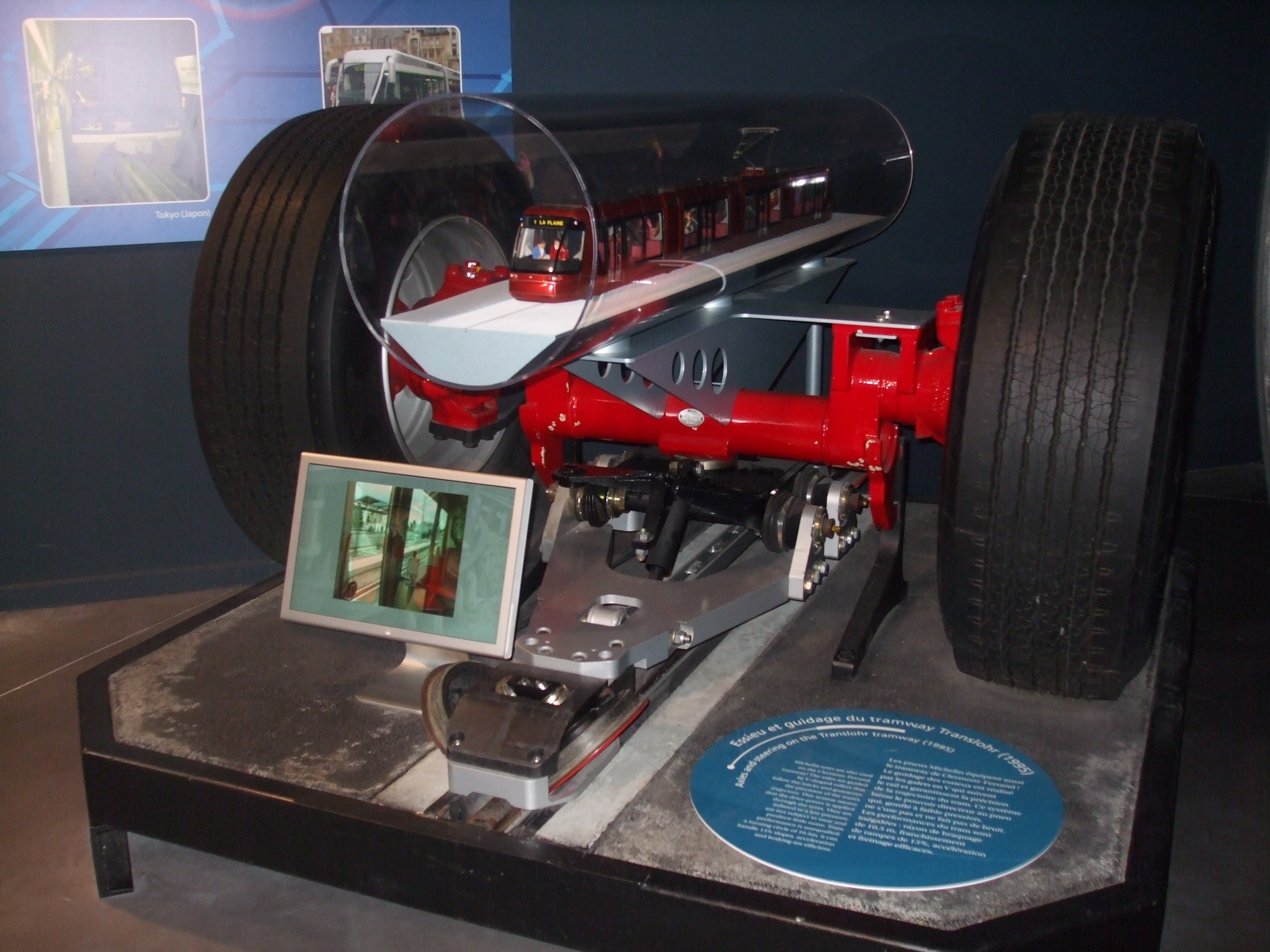
Guidance and steerage in a Translohr tram 1995. Rubber tyres support the vehicle, while metal wheels and a single rail provide guidance.

The Translohr system operates as a guided vehicle at all times, while with the Bombardier system the vehicles could be driven independently as requirements dictated, such as journeys to the depot. Consequently, the Bombardier vehicles were legally considered buses, had to be fitted with rear-view mirrors, lights and number plates, and were controlled with steering wheels and pedals like ordinary buses, though the steering wheel was not used when following the guidance rail. On the other hand, Translohr vehicles operate like standard trams and cannot move without guidance, so they are not classified as buses and are not equipped with number plates.

These systems have been likened to the tram equivalent of rubber-tyred metros, and they are also less efficient than steel-wheeled light rail vehicles. There is no evidence to prove the superiority of either guidance system. Both Bombardier and Translohr have had derailments during operation.

== Specifications ==
Switches and crossing

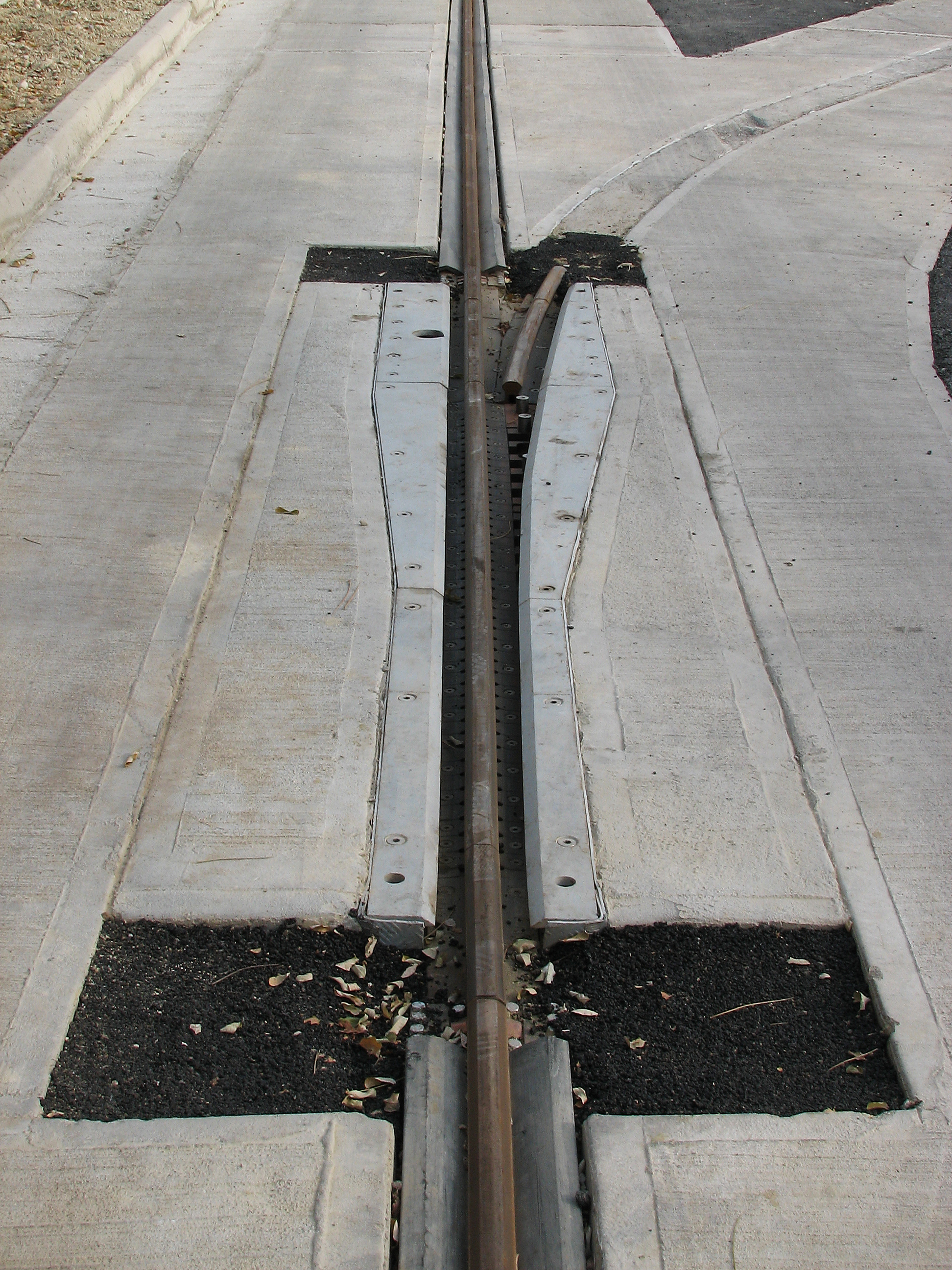
Translohr flexible single rail switch

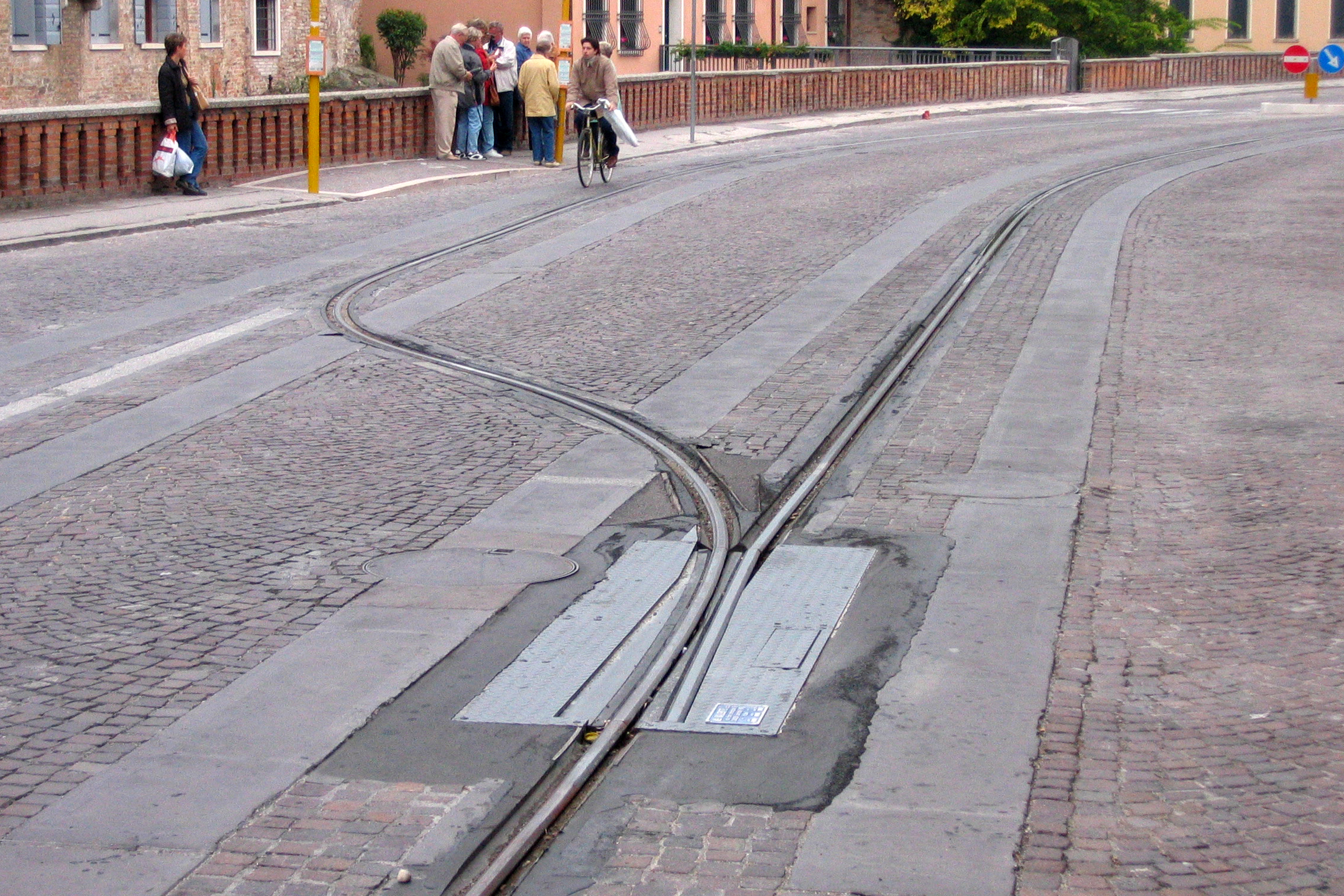
Translohr rigid two-rail switch

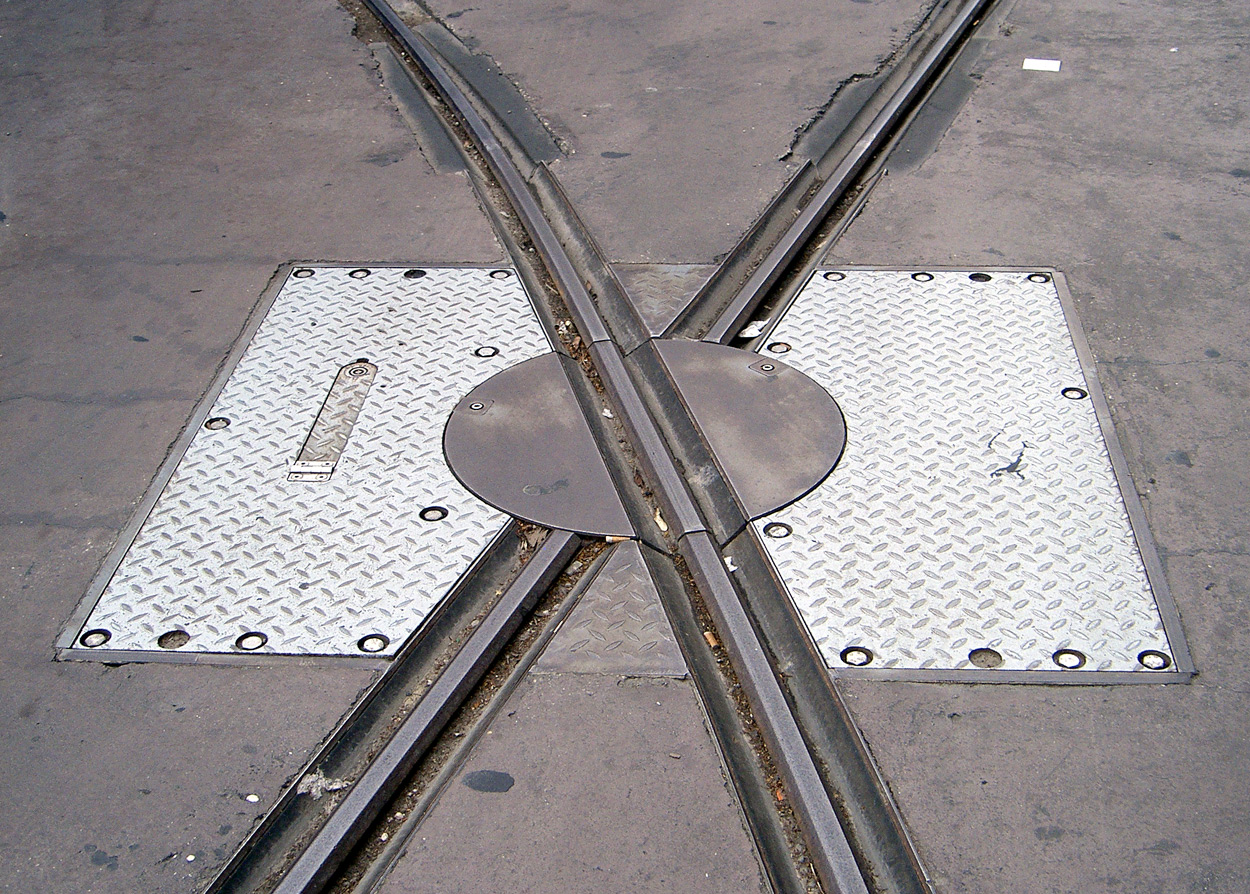
Translohr rail crossing

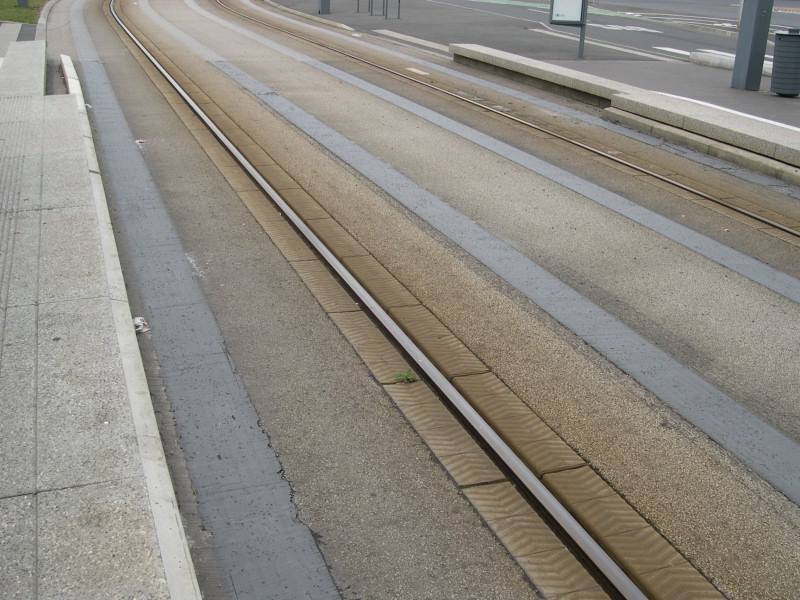
Bombardier GLT guide rail section

Feature	TVR in Nancy	TVR in Caen	Translohr
Principle	Diagram of the guide rail and guide wheel of the Bombardier's GLT	Diagram of the guide rail and guide wheel of the Bombardier's GLT	Diagram of the Translohr guide rail (green) and the tram's guide wheels (red)
Lane guidance	Partially	Continuous, except access to the depot	Continuous
Overhead line	Two-pole	Single-pole	Single-pole
Return current via guide rail	No	Yes	Yes
Pantograph	Two poles	Single beam	Single beam
Operating mode	Interior trolley	Interior trolley	Bidirectional cars
Outline	Three-part	Three-part	Three-, four-, five- or six-part
Articulated portal	No	No	Yes
Multiple traction possible	No	No	Yes, double traction
Vehicle registration number	Yes	Yes	No, except in Shanghai
Auxiliary drive	Diesel	Diesel	Battery
Use without guide rail	Yes, freely steerable (with overhead line or auxiliary drive)	Yes, freely steerable (only with auxiliary drive)	No, not freely steerable

== Retired systems ==
=== Bombardier Guided Light Transit (GLT) ===
- Nancy Guided Light Transit, France (2001–2023) – 40% of the line ran as a driver-steered trolleybus, and was part of the Nancy trolleybus system. The entire route was to be replaced by a tramway, but those plans were dropped in 2021, and it is being converted back into a conventional trolleybus system because of the higher cost of a tramway.
- Caen Guided Light Transit, France (2002–2017) – GLT closed in 2017 and converted to light rail which opened in 2019.

=== Translohr ===
- Zhangjiang Tram, Shanghai, China (STE3, 2010–2023); closed due to high operating costs and low ridership.
- TEDA Modern Guided Rail Tram, Tianjin, China (STE3, 2007–2023); closed due to maintenance issues.

== Proposed systems ==
- Cambridge, United Kingdom. One of the three systems under consideration for a proposed 90 mi (140 km) Cambridge Autonomous Metro where guided vehicles on rubber tires. The project started in 2017 was cancelled in 2021.

== See also ==
- Autonomous Rapid Transit
- Automated guideway transit
- Bi-articulated bus
- Budd–Michelin rubber-tyred rail cars
- Flat tyre
- Guided bus
- Larmanjat guided rail system
- Personal rapid transit
- Outline of tyres
- Rubber-tyred metro
- Slot car
- Tram
- Trolleybus
