= Grand Est =

Administrative region of France

Coordinates: 48.7544°N 5.8517°E

Grand Est Grossa Oschta (Alemannic German) Groussen Osten (Luxembourgish)
- Region
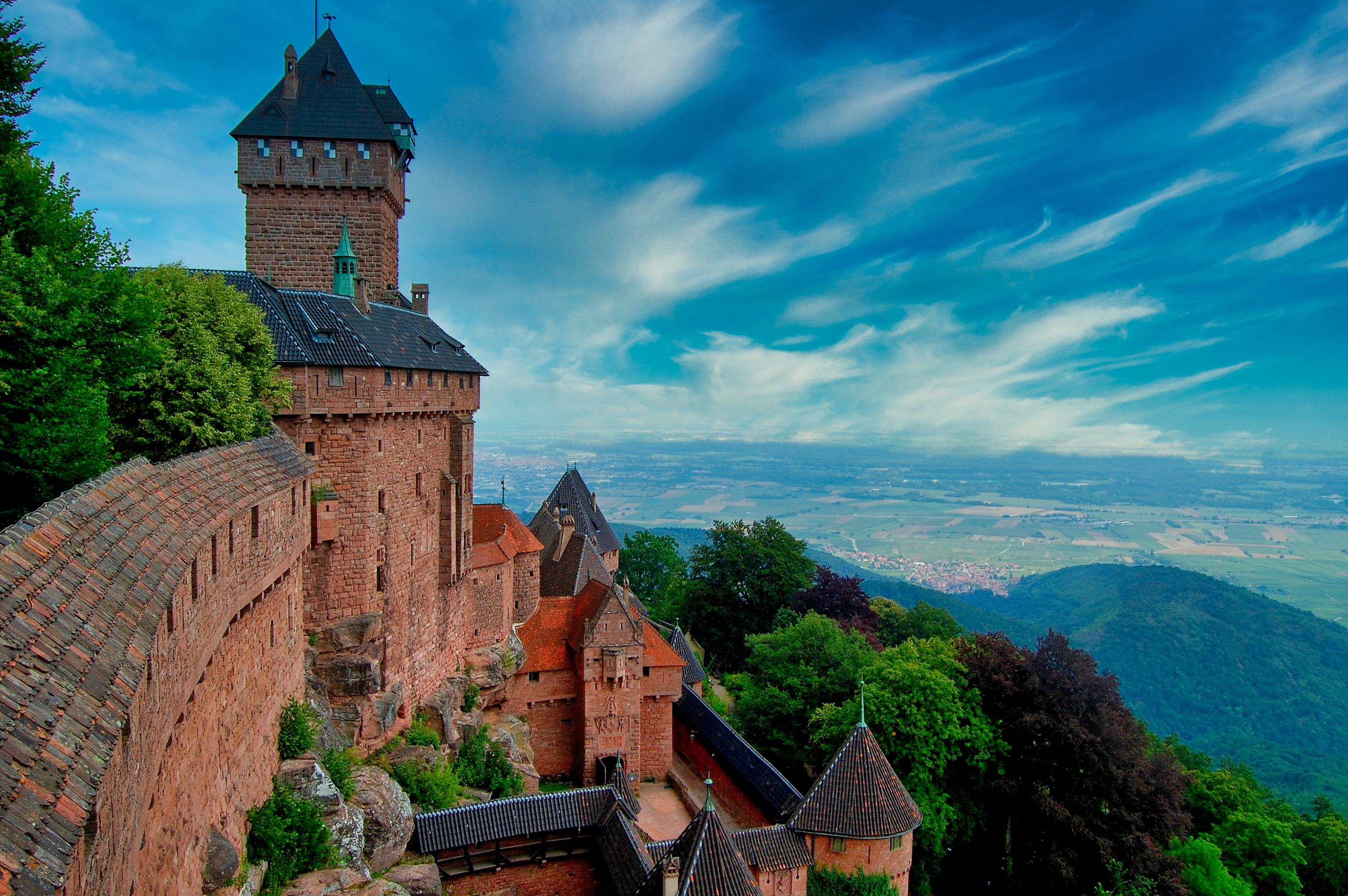
- The Château du Haut-Koenigsbourg north of Colmar

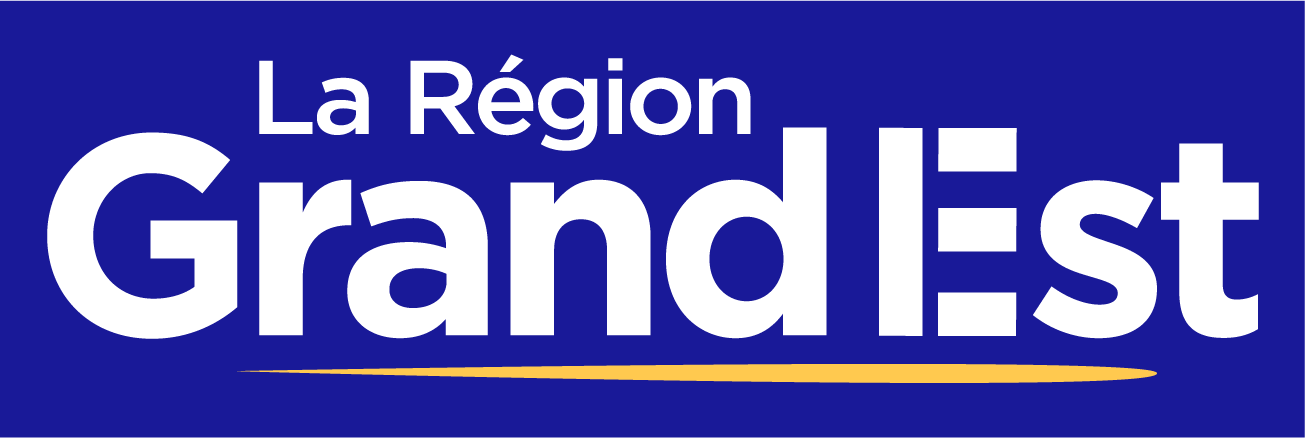
- Brandmark

- Country: France
- Prefecture: Strasbourg
- Departments: 10: Ardennes (08); Aube (10); Marne (51); Haute-Marne (52); Meurthe-et-Moselle (54); Meuse (55); Moselle (57); Bas-Rhin (67); Haut-Rhin (68); Vosges (88)

Government
  - Body: Regional Council of Grand Est
  - President of the Regional Council: Franck Leroy (DVD)

Area
  - Total: 57,433 km^{2} (22,175 sq mi)
  - Rank: 5th

Population (2023)
  - Total: 5,563,378
  - Density: 96.867/km^{2} (250.89/sq mi)

GDP
  - Total: €166.919 billion
  - Per capita: €30,100
- Time zone: UTC+01:00 (CET)
  - Summer (DST): UTC+02:00 (CEST)
- ISO 3166 code: FR-GES
- NUTS Region: FRF
- Official languages: French,
- Recognised languages: Alemannic German and Moselle Franconian
- Website: www.grandest.fr

Grand Est (French: [ɡʁɑ̃t‿ɛst]; lit. 'Greater East') is one of France's landlocked administrative regions, this being in northeastern France. It superseded three former administrative regions, Alsace, Champagne-Ardenne, and Lorraine, on 1 January 2016 under the provisional name of Alsace-Champagne-Ardenne-Lorraine (pronounced [alzas ʃɑ̃paɲ aʁdɛn lɔʁɛn], ACAL or, less commonly, ALCALIA) as a result of territorial reform which had been passed by the French Parliament in 2014. (Note: The name Alsace-Champagne-Ardenne-Lorraine was created by hyphenating the merged regions' names in alphabetical order; the regional council had to approve a new name for the region by 1 July 2016. France's Conseil d'État approved Grand Est as the new name of the region on 28 September 2016, effective 30 September 2016.)

The region sits astride three water basins (Seine, Meuse, and Rhine), spanning an area of 57,433 km^{2} (22,175 sq mi), the fifth largest in France; it includes two mountain ranges (Vosges and Ardennes). It shares borders with Belgium, Luxembourg, Germany, and Switzerland. As of 2021, it had a population of 5,561,287 inhabitants. The prefecture and largest city is Strasbourg.

The East of France has a rich and diverse culture, being situated at a crossroads between the Gallic-Latin and Germanic worlds. This history is reflected in the variety of languages spoken there (Alsatian, Champenois, Lorrain and Lorraine Franconian). Most of today's Grand Est region was considered "Eastern" as early as the 8th century, when it constituted the southern part of the Francian territory of Austrasia. The city of Reims (in Champagne), where Frankish king Clovis I had been baptized in 496 AD, would later play a prominent ceremonial role in French monarchical history as the traditional site of the coronation of the kings of France. The Champagne fairs played a significant role in the economy of medieval Europe as well. Alsace and Lorraine thrived in the sphere of influence of the Holy Roman Empire for most of the Middle Ages and Renaissance, and subject to competing claims by France and Germany over the centuries.

The region has distinctive traditions such as the celebration of Saint Nicholas Day, Christmas markets, or traditions involving the Easter hare in Alsace and Lorraine. Alsace-Moselle are furthermore subject to local law for historical reasons. With a long industrial history and strong agriculture and tourism (arts, gastronomy, sightseeing), the East of France is one of the top economic producing regions in the country.

== Toponymy ==
=== Provisional name ===
The provisional name of the region was Alsace-Champagne-Ardenne-Lorraine, formed by combining the names of the three former regions—Alsace, Champagne-Ardenne and Lorraine—in alphabetical order with hyphens. The formula for the provisional name of the region was established by the territorial reform law and applied to all but one of the provisional names for new regions. The ACAL regional council, which was elected in December 2015, was given the task of choosing a name for the region and submitting it to the Conseil d'État—France's highest authority for administrative law—by 1 July 2016 for approval. The provisional name of the region was retired on 30 September 2016, when the new name of the region, Grand Est, took effect.

In Alsace and in Lorraine, the new region has frequently been called ALCA, for Alsace-Lorraine-Champagne-Ardennes, on the internet.

Like the name Région Hauts-de-France (and, until 2015, the name Région Centre), the name Région Grand Est contains no reference whatsoever to the area's history or identity, but merely describes its geographical location within metropolitan France.

=== Permanent name ===
In a poll conducted in November 2014 by France 3 in Champagne-Ardenne, Grand Est (29.16%) and Austrasie (22.65%) were the top two names among 25 candidates and 4,701 votes. Grand Est also topped a poll the following month conducted by L'Est Républicain, receiving 42% of 3,324 votes.

The names which received a moderate amount of discussion were:

- Grand Est français, a term used to refer to the northeast quarter of Metropolitan France, although this term refers to a geographic region larger than just ACAL. The term has been commonly used and topped the polls mentioned above.
- Grand Est Europe (Great East Europe), a variant of Grand Est that alludes to the region being a gateway to Europe both through trade and since Strasbourg is home to several European institutions (which makes it one of the three unofficial capitals of the European Union). However, the name was mocked for how it could suggest that the region is in Eastern Europe.
- Austrasie (Austrasia), which refers to an historical region spanning parts of present-day northeast France, the Benelux, and northwest Germany.
- Quatre frontières (Four Frontiers), which refers to the region's border with four countries.

== Geography ==
Grand Est covers 57,433 square kilometres (22,175 sq mi) of land and is the sixth-largest of the regions of France. Grand Est borders four countries—Belgium (Wallonia region) and Luxembourg (Cantons of Esch-sur-Alzette and Remich) on the north, Germany (States of Baden-Württemberg, Rhineland-Palatinate and Saarland) on the east and northeast, and Switzerland on the southeast. It is the only French region to border more than two countries, or more countries than French regions. Its neighbors within France are Bourgogne-Franche-Comté on the south, Île-de-France on the west, and Hauts-de-France on the northwest.

Map of the new region with its ten départements, colored according to the historical provinces as they existed until 1790. Champagne Lorraine Alsace Barrois Three Bishoprics County of Saarwerden Principality of Salm-Salm Free County of Burgundy Prince-Bishopric of Liège Duchy of Luxemburg small principalities

=== Departments ===
Grand Est contains ten departments: Ardennes, Aube, Bas-Rhin, Marne, Haute-Marne, Haut-Rhin, Meurthe-et-Moselle, Meuse, Moselle, Vosges.

=== Topography ===
The main ranges in the region include the Vosges to the east and the Ardennes to the north.

=== Hydrology ===
The region is bordered on the east by the Rhine, which forms about half of the border with Germany. Other major rivers which flow through the region include the Meuse, Moselle, Marne, and Saône.

Lakes in the region include lac de Gérardmer, lac de Longemer, lac de Retournemer, lac des Corbeaux, Lac de Bouzey, lac de Madine, étang du Stock and lac de Pierre-Percée.

=== Climate ===
Grand Est climate depends on the proximity of the sea. In Champagne and Western Lorraine, the climate is oceanic (Köppen: Cfb), with cool to mild winters and warm summers. But Ardennes, Moselle and Alsace climates are borderline humid continental (Köppen: Dfb) – oceanic (Köppen: Cfb), characterized by cold winters with frequent days below the freezing point, and hot summers, with many days with temperatures up to 32 °C.

== History ==
=== Formation ===
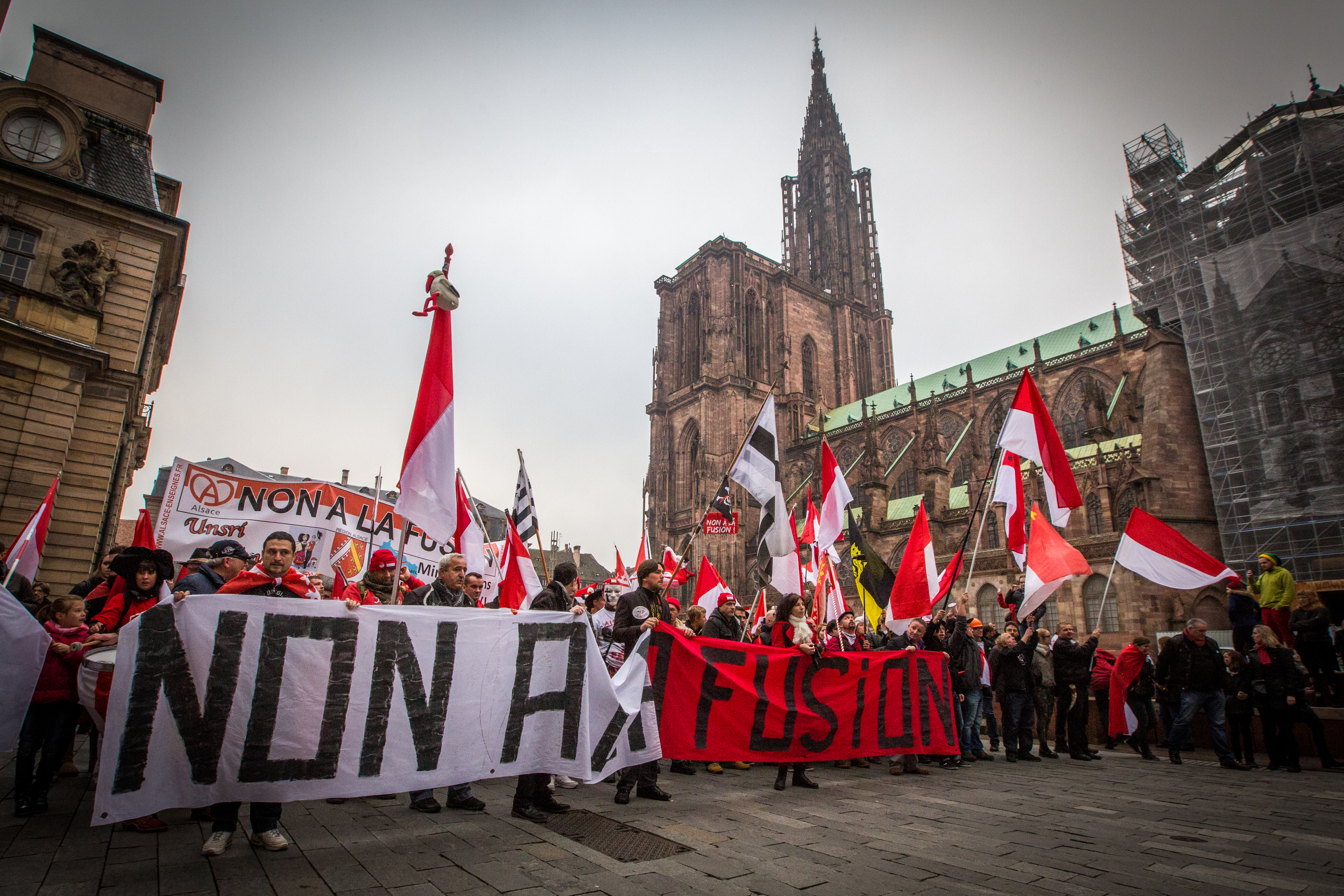
Protesters of the Alsace independence movement holding a banner saying "No to merger" (Non a la fusion), 2014 in Strasbourg.

Grand Est is the result of territorial reform legislation passed in 2014 by the French Parliament to reduce the number of regions in Metropolitan France—the part of France in continental Europe—from 22 to 13. Grand Est is the merger of three regions: Alsace, Champagne-Ardenne, and Lorraine.

=== Opposition ===
The merger has been, and still is, strongly opposed by some groups in Alsace, and a large majority of Alsatians. The territorial reform law allows new regions to choose the seat of the regional councils, but specifically made Strasbourg the seat of the Grand Est regional council—a move to appease the region's politicians.

The creation of the new region was unpopular among Alsatians. In response, the Government created the European Collectivity of Alsace merging the departments of Bas Rhin and Haut Rhin, to take effect in 2021.

== Demographics ==
The region has an official population of 5,562,651 (municipal population on 1 January 2021).

Cities with over 20,000 inhabitants	Former region	2021
Strasbourg	Alsace	291,313
Reims	Champagne-Ardenne	179,380
Metz	Lorraine	120,874
Mulhouse	Alsace	106,341
Nancy	Lorraine	104,260
Colmar	Alsace	67,730
Troyes	Champagne-Ardenne	62,782
Charleville-Mézières	Champagne-Ardenne	46,398
Châlons-en-Champagne	Champagne-Ardenne	43,877
Thionville	Lorraine	42,163
Haguenau	Alsace	35,715
Schiltigheim	Alsace	34,129
Épinal	Lorraine	31,832
Vandœuvre-lès-Nancy	Lorraine	29,537
Illkirch-Graffenstaden	Alsace	27,118
Saint-Dizier	Champagne-Ardenne	23,068
Saint-Louis	Alsace	22,698
Épernay	Champagne-Ardenne	22,001
Montigny-lès-Metz	Lorraine	21,854
Chaumont	Champagne-Ardenne	21,699
Forbach	Lorraine	21,130
Sarreguemines	Lorraine	20,624
Lingolsheim	Alsace	20,266

2021 Rank	Department	Legal Population in 2021	Area (km²)	Aroen (Pop./km²)	INSEE Dept. No.
1	Bas-Rhin	1,152,662	4,755	242.5	67
2	Moselle	1,049,942	6,216	169	57
3	Haut-Rhin	767,083	3,525	218	68
4	Meurthe-et-Moselle	732,486	5,246	140	54
5	Marne	565,292	8,162	69.5	51
6	Vosges	360,673	5,874	61.5	88
7	Aube	311,329	6,004	52	10
8	Ardennes	268,859	5,229	51.5	08
9	Meuse	181,919	6,211	29.5	55
10	Haute-Marne	171,042	6,211	27.5	52

== Government ==
=== Regional council ===
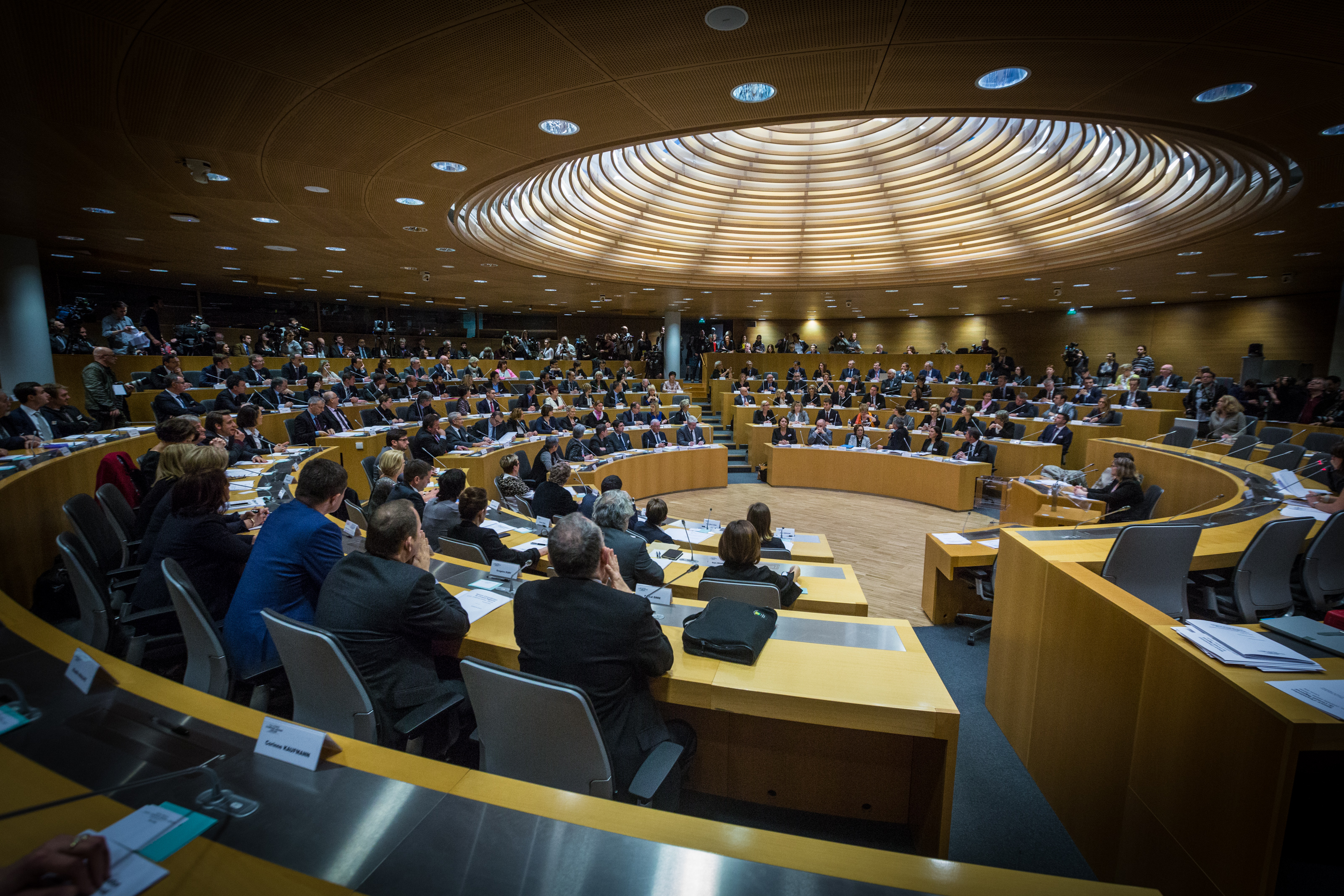
Inaugural session of the new Regional council on 4 January 2016

The current headquarters of the Alsace Regional Council, which serves as the headquarters of Grand Est's regional council

The regional council has limited administrative authority, mostly concerning the promotion of the region's economy and financing educational and cultural activities. The regional council has no legislative authority. The seat of the regional council will be Strasbourg. The regional council, elected in December 2015, is controlled by The Republicans. The elected inaugural president of the Grand Est Regional Council is Philippe Richert, who was previously the President of the Alsace Regional Council. The current president is Jean Rottner.

== Economy ==
The gross domestic product (GDP) of the region was 159.9 billion euros in 2018, accounting for 6.7% of French economic output. GDP per capita adjusted for purchasing power was 25,400 euros or 84% of the EU27 average in the same year. The GDP per employee was 101% of the EU average.

== Transport and infrastructure ==
=== Rail transport ===
The region has five tram networks:

- Strasbourg tramway
- Reims tramway
- Nancy Guided Light Transit
- Mulhouse tramway
- Saarbahn (Tram-train)

=== Airports ===
The region has four airports:

- EuroAirport Basel Mulhouse Freiburg
- Châlons Vatry Airport
- Metz Nancy Lorraine Airport
- Strasbourg Airport

However, other airports such as Charles de Gaulle Airport, Luxembourg Airport, Stuttgart Airport and Saarbrücken Airport are also used by air travellers from the region.

=== Motorways ===
The region has eighteen motorways:

- A4 Paris to Strasbourg
- A5 Paris to Langres
- A26 Calais to Troyes
- A30 Uckange to Longwy in N52
- A31 Beaune to Luxembourg in A3 motorway (Luxembourg)
- A33 Nancy to Phalsbourg in N4
- A34 Reims to Sedan
- A35 Strasbourg to Basel
- A36 Beaune to Mulhouse
- A304 project in city of Charleville-Mézières
- A313 in city of Pont-à-Mousson
- A314 and A315 in city of Metz
- A320 in city of Forbach
- A330 in city of Nancy
- A340 Brumath to Haguenau in D1340
- A344 in city of Reims
- A351 in city of Strasbourg
- A352 Molsheim to Schirmeck in D1420

The region has twelve cities that have ring roads:

- Strasbourg
- Reims
- Metz
- Nancy
- Mulhouse
- Troyes
- Châlons-en-Champagne
- Épinal
- Colmar
- Thionville
- Longwy

== Heritage ==
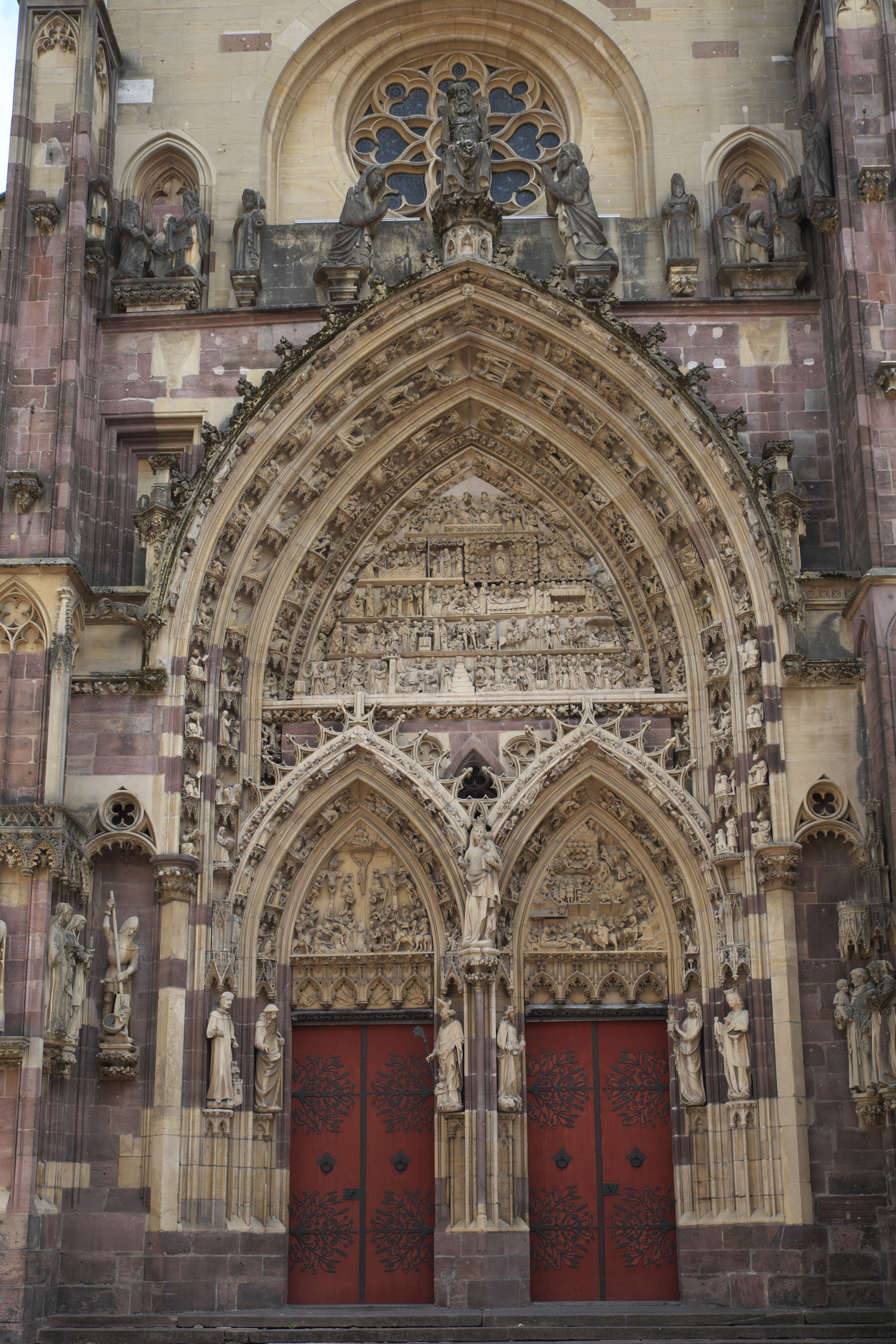
West portal of St Theobald's Church of Thann, a masterpiece of late 14th-century sculpture and architecture.

Grand Est is rich with architectural monuments from the Roman Empire to the early 21st century.

Gothic architecture is particularly conspicuous, with many famous cathedrals, basilicas and churches, such as Reims Cathedral, Strasbourg Cathedral, Metz Cathedral, Troyes Cathedral, Châlons Cathedral, Toul Cathedral, the Basilica of L'Épine, the Basilica of Saint-Nicolas-de-Port, the Basilica of Notre-Dame, Avioth, the Basilica of St. Urbain in Troyes, Thann Church, Niederhaslach Church, Notre-Dame-en-Vaux, St. George's Church, Sélestat and St. Peter and St. Paul's Church, Wissembourg.

== See also ==
- Alsace
- Lorraine (region)
- Alsace-Lorraine
- Champagne (historical province)
- Ardenne
- Champagne-Ardenne
- Regions of France
