= Bus Verts du Calvados =

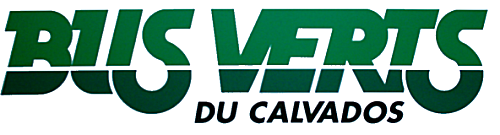

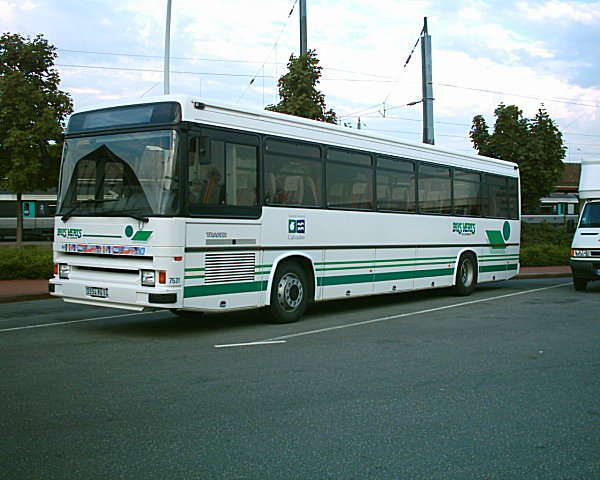
- Renault Tracer bus at Trouville-Deauville in 2004.
- Headquarters: Mondeville
- Locale: Calvados
- Service area: France
- Service type: Regional bus service, Interregional bus service
- Alliance: Twisto
- Routes: 45 lines
- Destinations: Bayeux, Falaise, Lisieux, Le Havre
- Operator: Keolis Calvados
- Website: https://www.nomadcar14.fr

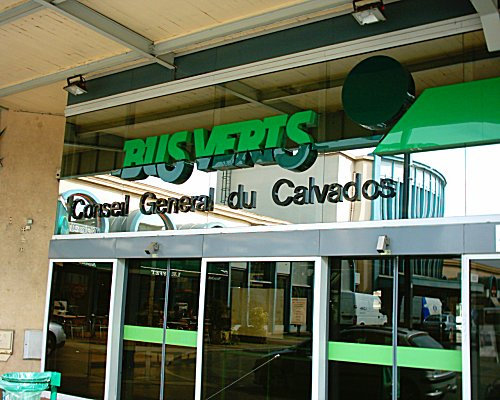
Caen's Public transport interchange.

Bus Verts du Calvados is a network of interurban buses in the département of Calvados, France. The network is operated on behalf of the Conseil Général du Calvados by Keolis Calvados, a subsidiary of the French Keolis transport group.

Keolis Calvados is the old Courriers Normands company which operated buses in and around Caen after the closure of the Tramways Electriques de Caen in 1935.

Common lines of interest for tourists to the area include the #BV01, running from Caen Gare SNCF to Ouistreham, the #30 connecting Caen to Bayeux, and the #70, which is the most convenient public route to Omaha Beach and Point du Hoc. Tourists are advised to check the schedules closely, as the buses run very infrequently, necessitating careful planning.
