= Bombardier Guided Light Transit =

Guided bus technology and associated infrastructure

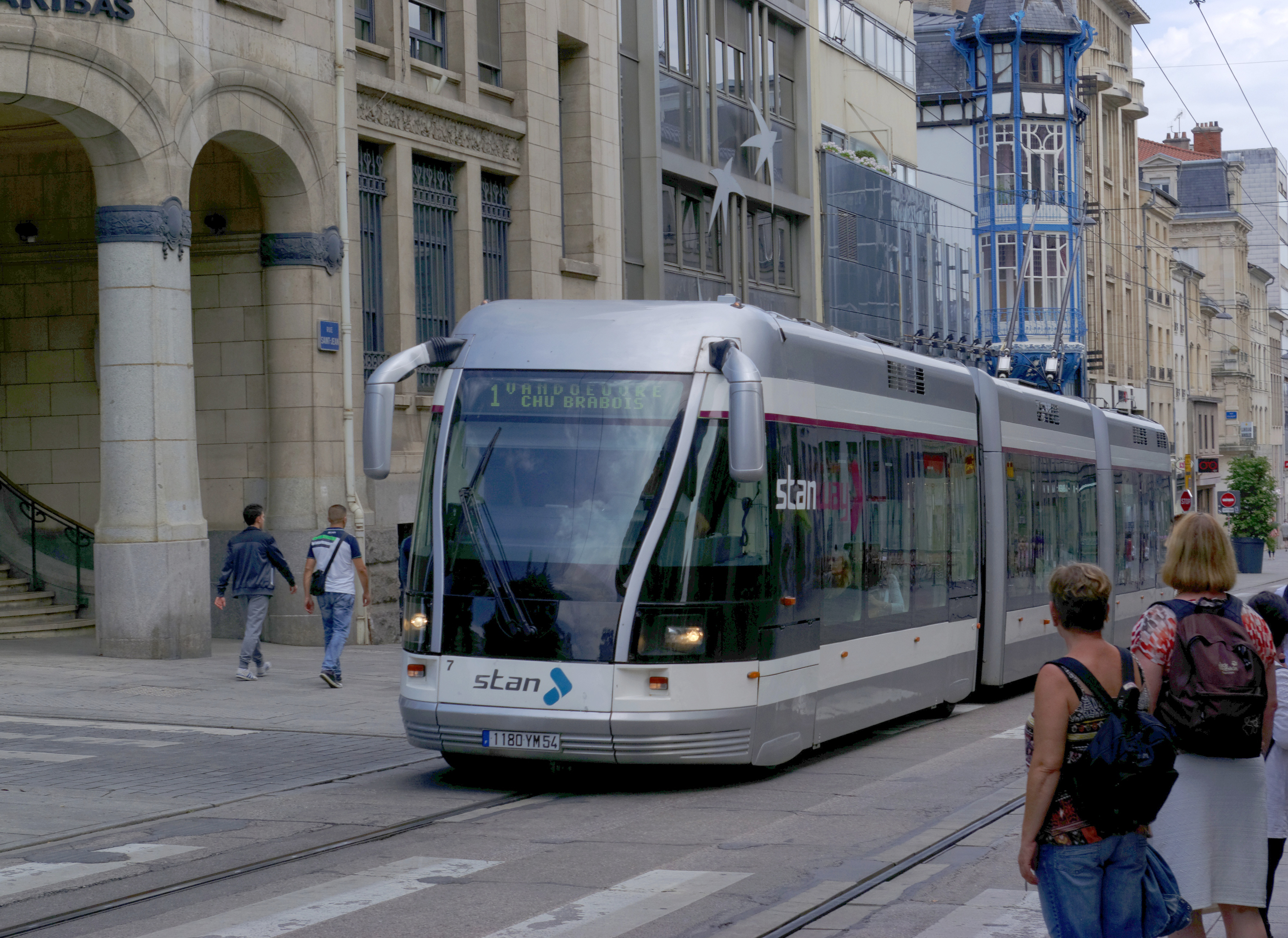
GLT vehicles bear a strong resemblance to trams, but are actually buses capable of following a single guidance rail or even operating without any surface guidance system.

Guided Light Transit (GLT, French: Transport sur Voie Réservée or TVR) was the name of guided bus technology and associated infrastructure manufactured by Bombardier Transportation (now Alstom). Two GLT prototypes were designed and tested from 1987 onwards by BN in the region of Rochefort in Belgium. It was eventually installed in two French cities: Nancy and Caen. The Caen system was closed in 2017 and replaced by conventional trams, while the Nancy system was closed in March 2023 and has been replaced by trolleybuses.

Both of the systems in these cities are referred to as "tramways on tyres", and in common with tram systems they use a surface guidance system and in normal operation are powered by electricity drawn from an overhead wire. However, while the vehicles are guided by a central guidance rail, they ride on rubber tyres, not on rails. There has been disagreement about whether they should be called "trams", for that reason and also because they are capable of being steered and operating independently of the guidance rail, using auxiliary diesel engines. GLT is effectively a model of guided dual-mode bus, but when GLT vehicles use a pantograph to collect current, as do those in Caen, they are not commonly considered to be trolleybuses. English transport publications generally refer to the GLT and the competing Translohr system as "rubber-tyred tramways", but rarely simply as "tramways", as they are not tramways in the conventional sense, but neither are they buses when pantograph-equipped and operating in service as designed (i.e. in electric mode).

GLT was one of the few models (together with the Innovia APM) of rubber-tyred vehicles produced by Bombardier's transport division, which is otherwise focused on rail transport.

== Characteristics ==
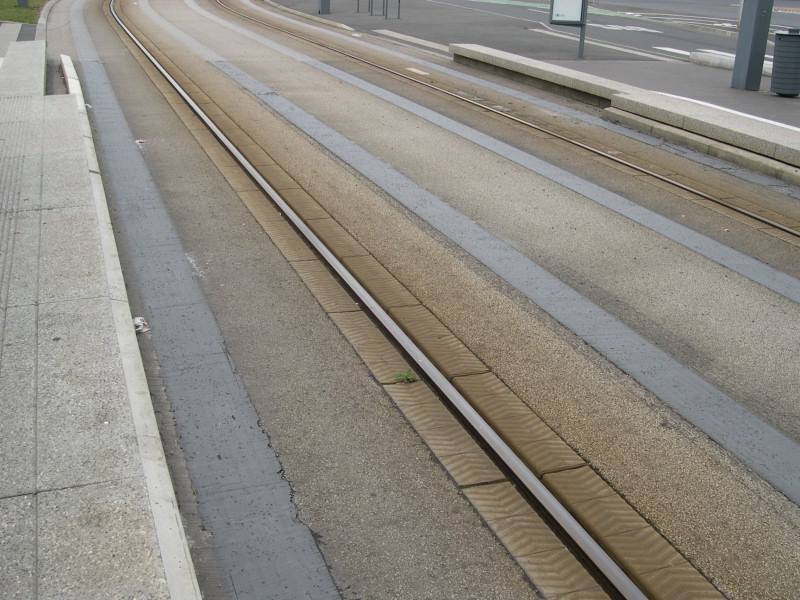
A central rail embedded in the road guides GLT vehicles while they are in their "tram-like" mode.

Cross section of guide rail and guide wheel

GLT and the similar Translohr are often described as the tram equivalent of rubber-tyred metro technology, but this is not strictly accurate; while the GLT follows a central rail, the rail does not support the vehicle, and the actual wheels which are as independent as those of a regular bus. The wheels of rubber-tyred metros, on the other hand, are bound and guided by their rails in the same way as are steel-wheeled trains. Unlike trams and Translohr vehicles, GLT vehicles have a steering wheel, though it is not used when following a guidance rail. On the GLT line in Nancy, more than one-third of the 10 km (6.2 mi) route has no guide rail, and steering is controlled entirely by the driver on those sections. The Nancy GLT system is operated by the Société de Transports de l'Agglomération Nancienne, or STAN.

With two articulation points and a total length of 24.5 metres (80 ft 5 in), GLT vehicles are shorter than most modern trams, but long compared with conventional buses. They are designed to look like trams, but they are unidirectional and have bus-like rear-view mirrors.

They have 100% low floors, have 40 seats, and have standing room for as many as 105 passengers.

In Caen, where the central guidance rail had been installed on all sections of the passenger-service route, the vehicles collected their power from a pantograph, returning it through the central guidance rail, and used their diesel engines and steering wheels only while travelling to and from the depot. Use of a pantograph effectively requires that a surface guidance system be used, to ensure the vehicle remains approximately centred below the overhead wire, so that its pantograph does not slip out from underneath the wire. The Caen vehicles thus could not move laterally away from the overhead wire except when running in diesel mode (as conventional buses), and for this reason the Caen routes are not commonly considered to have been a trolleybus system.

Nancy's fleet of 25 GLT vehicles used dual trolley poles to collect and return their electric power, in order to allow the use of existing wires constructed for use by the town's previous generation of trolleybuses and to permit operation, where desired by the transport authority, away from the guide rail. The Nancy vehicles followed a guidance rail on about 60% of the route, and thus the Nancy route uniquely is considered to have been both a rubber-tyred tramway and a trolleybus line. The system was first brought into use for passenger service in February 2001, but operation was suspended from March 2001 through March 2002 while Bombardier performed upgrades to the vehicles.

In Caen, the GLT fleet began operation in November 2002, incorporating the changes made to Nancy's vehicles during the upgrade. They were operated by the Compagnie des Transports de l'Agglomération Caennaise under the name Twisto until 2017, when the system was shut down and replaced by a conventional tram system.

== Advantages ==
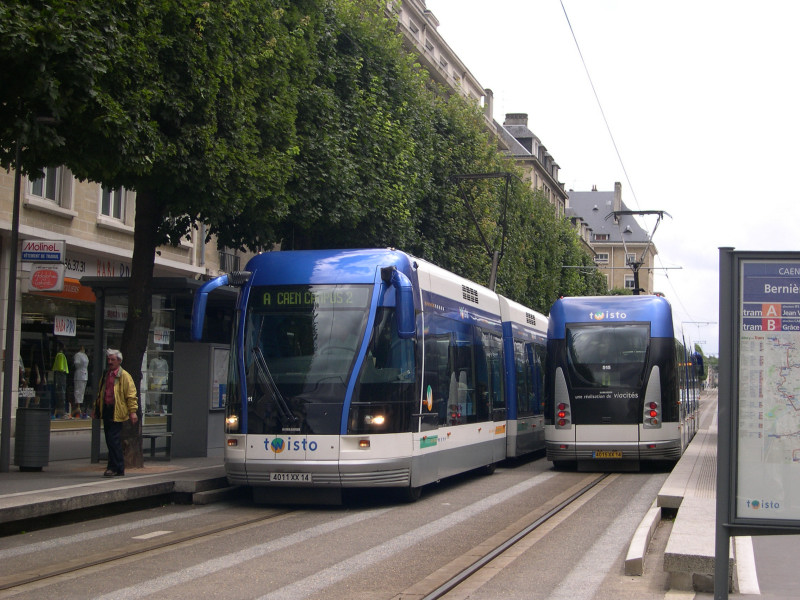
Much like trams, GLT vehicles can dock with low station platforms for level boarding.

While the GLT's central guidance rail is not significantly less expensive than the rails needed by regular trams, the overall system can be installed at a lower cost since existing trolleybus wires can be used without the installation of tracks, and not all new sections need rails or electric wires installed; even if the entire passenger route is equipped with guidance rails and wires, as in Caen, the depot need not be located immediately by the track, saving planners from having to find space for a new yard in what may be a central and high-valued area of the city.

Another advantage over trams, which was particularly of interest to planners in Nancy, is that rubber tyres give significantly more traction than steel wheels, and so can be used to climb steeper hills, up to a grade or slope of 13%. The Nancy route T1 includes a section with a 13% grade.

Compared to buses, the use of a guidance rail allows GLT vehicles running in parallel lanes to pass closer together than drivers could safely steer. They can also draw up to level, tram-like platforms that allow for easier boarding, and give access to passengers dependent on wheelchairs without requiring the time-consuming deployment of ramps or 'kneeling' systems.

== Disadvantages ==
The GLT systems in place have experienced some mechanical problems which, though they have largely been resolved, have discouraged some other cities from adopting the technology. The vehicles have shown a tendency to move erratically when running free, and do not respond well should the driver mistakenly attempt to steer while following the guidance rail (for example, to avoid a pedestrian or animal running into the street).

In addition, due to the tyres running over the same spot in the road, in both Nancy and Caen there has been significant rutting of the roadway, resulting in extensive repairs at significant cost to the operator. This could be considered to add to the already high running costs.

Ride quality is also said to be poor, not much of an improvement on a bus, due to the four-wheeled design, whereas trams have bogies.

Guidewheel mechanical failures have occurred, causing the trolleybus to swerve off the roadway. This is due to the high centrifugal forces exerted on the wheel when rounding corners. Due to this, a speed limit of 10 km/h (6.2 mph) is now enforced on corners.

One of the main aims of the system, to achieve a lower cost per kilometre than trams, has failed. Other French tramways achieve a cost per kilometre at least 10% lower than that for the guided bus. Similarly, the cost per person of the vehicles is also noticeably higher with the guided bus than a tram.

Where snowfall is an issue, this system may not be practical: since the guide rail forms the return leg of the electrical circuit, accumulation of ice and snow on the rail could cause intermittent power interruptions to the vehicle. Also, as the vehicle does not place a significant portion of its weight on the guide wheel (most of it being supported by the rubber tyres), snow packed into the flangeways or atop the rail by road traffic could lift the guide wheel off the rail, leading the vehicle to go off course.

Critics of the system also point out that, unlike a conventional tramway, GLT is a proprietary system, meaning that once having installed it, a city would face difficulties in purchasing vehicles from any manufacturer other than Bombardier. A standard tramway, by contrast, can easily accommodate vehicles from multiple suppliers; Nancy's neighbour Strasbourg, for example, has chosen the Alstom Citadis tram to supplement its existing Eurotram fleet.

Because of the problems encountered by cities which have purchased the Bombardier Guided Bus (one of which has demanded compensation for the costs it has had to pay for the GLT) Bombardier will not sell any more GLT systems, at least until all the issues have been resolved.

== Legal status ==
GLT vehicles are legally considered buses, and they must bear number plates, rear-view mirrors and lights. Unlike trams and Translohr vehicles, GLT vehicles have a steering wheel (though it is not used when following a guidance rail), and are capable of operating independent of the guideway.

== See also ==
- Bus rapid transit
- CRRC Autonomous Rail Rapid Transit
- List of rubber-tyred tram systems
- Roll way
- Translohr
- Trolleybuses in Nancy
- Tyre
- Véhicule Automatique Léger (VAL)
