= Virginie Joron =

French politician (born 1973)

Virginie Joron MEP
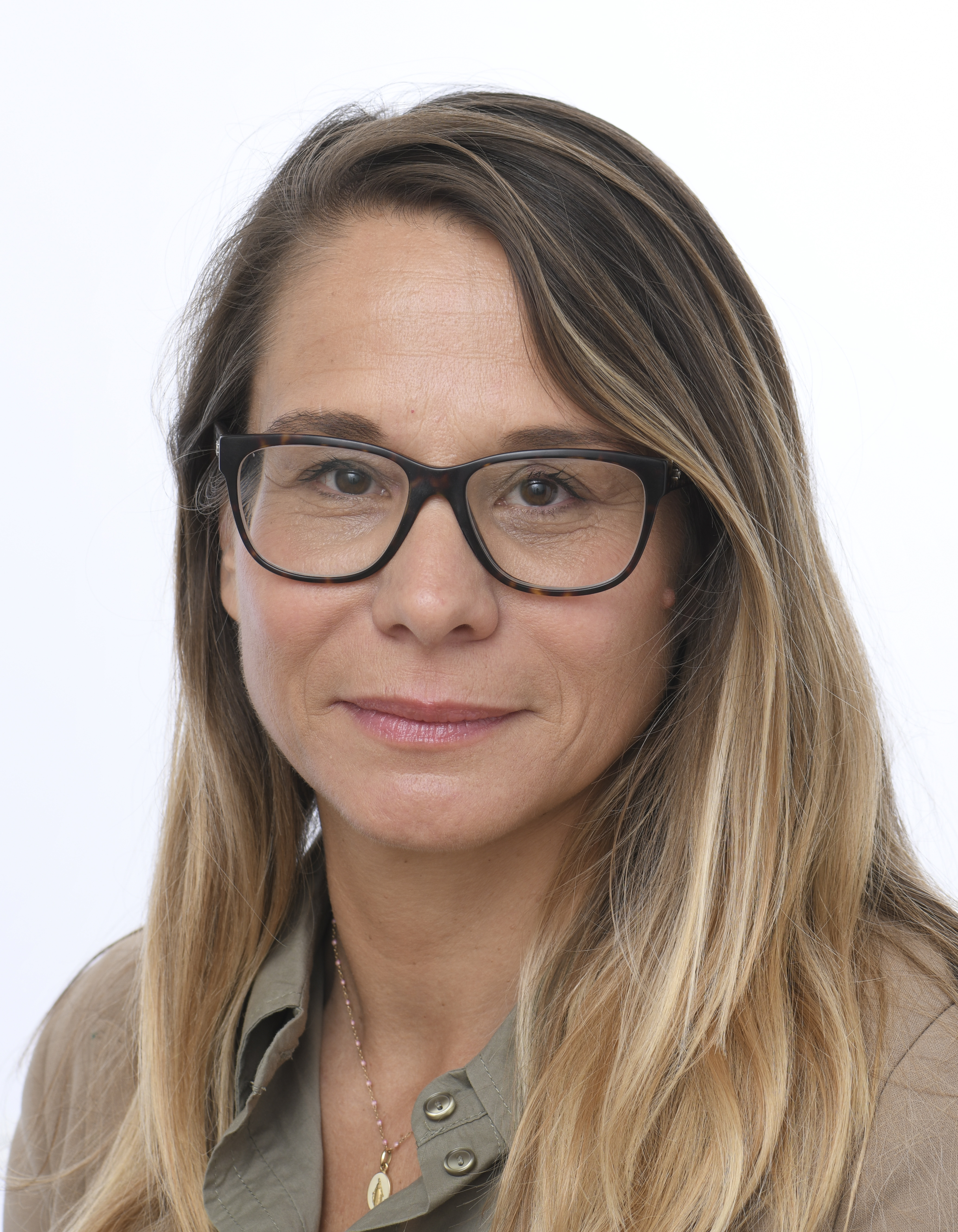

Member of the European Parliament
- Incumbent
- Assumed office 2 July 2019
- Constituency: France

Member of the Regional Council of Grand Est
- In office 4 January 2016 – 2 July 2021

Personal details
- Born: 11 December 1973 (age 52) Troyes, France
- Party: National Rally
- Education: University of Nice

Virginie Joron (born 11 December 1973) is a French politician. A member of the National Rally (RN), she was elected to the Regional Council of Grand Est in 2015. She was elected the European Parliament in 2019 and re-elected in 2024.
