= Jean Kaltenbach =

French politician (1927–2021)

President of the Regional Council of Champagne-Ardenne
- In office 1988–1998
- Preceded by: Bernard Stasi
- Succeeded by: Jean-Claude Étienne

Mayor of Eurville-Bienville
- In office 1972–2001
- Preceded by: position established
- Succeeded by: Jean Bozek

Mayor of Eurville
- In office 1965–1972
- Preceded by: Gilbert Perrin
- Succeeded by: position abolished

Personal details
- Born: 5 April 1927 Saint-Hippolyte, France
- Died: 16 April 2021 (aged 94)
- Party: RPR

Jean Kaltenbach (5 April 1927 – 16 April 2021) was a French politician. A member of the Rally for the Republic, he served as President of the Regional Council of Champagne Ardenne from 1988 to 1998.

== Biography ==
Kaltenbach began his career as a pharmacist in Eurville. He then became Mayor of Eurville in 1965, serving until the commune merged with Bienville in 1972. He then served as the first Mayor of Eurville-Bienville from 1972 to 2001. During the 1982 French cantonal elections, he became General Councilor of the Canton of Chevillon, serving until 1988.

Following Bernard Stasi's resignation as President of the Regional Council of Champagne-Ardenne in 1988, Kaltenbach succeeded him. He was re-elected in 1992 with support from the Rally for the Republic (RPR) and the Union for French Democracy (UDF). He opted not to run for re-election in 1998 due to disagreements within the RPR-UDF coalition.

Jean Kaltenbach died on 16 April 2021 at the age of 94.
