= Regional Council of Grand Est =

Regional Council of Grand Est Conseil régional du Grand Est
- Logo of Grand Est

Type
- Type: Regional council

History
- Preceded by: Regional council of Alsace; Regional council of Champagne-Ardenne; Regional council of Lorraine
- New session started: 2 July 2021

Leadership
- President: Franck Leroy, DVD since 13 January 2022

Structure
- Seats: 169
- Political groups: Majority (94): The Republicans (94); Opposition (75): National Rally (33); Ensemble Citoyens (15); Europe Ecology – The Greens (14); Socialist Party - French Communist Party (13)

Elections
- Voting system: Two-round list proportional representation system with majority bonus
- Last election: 20 and 27 June 2021
- Next election: 2028

Meeting place
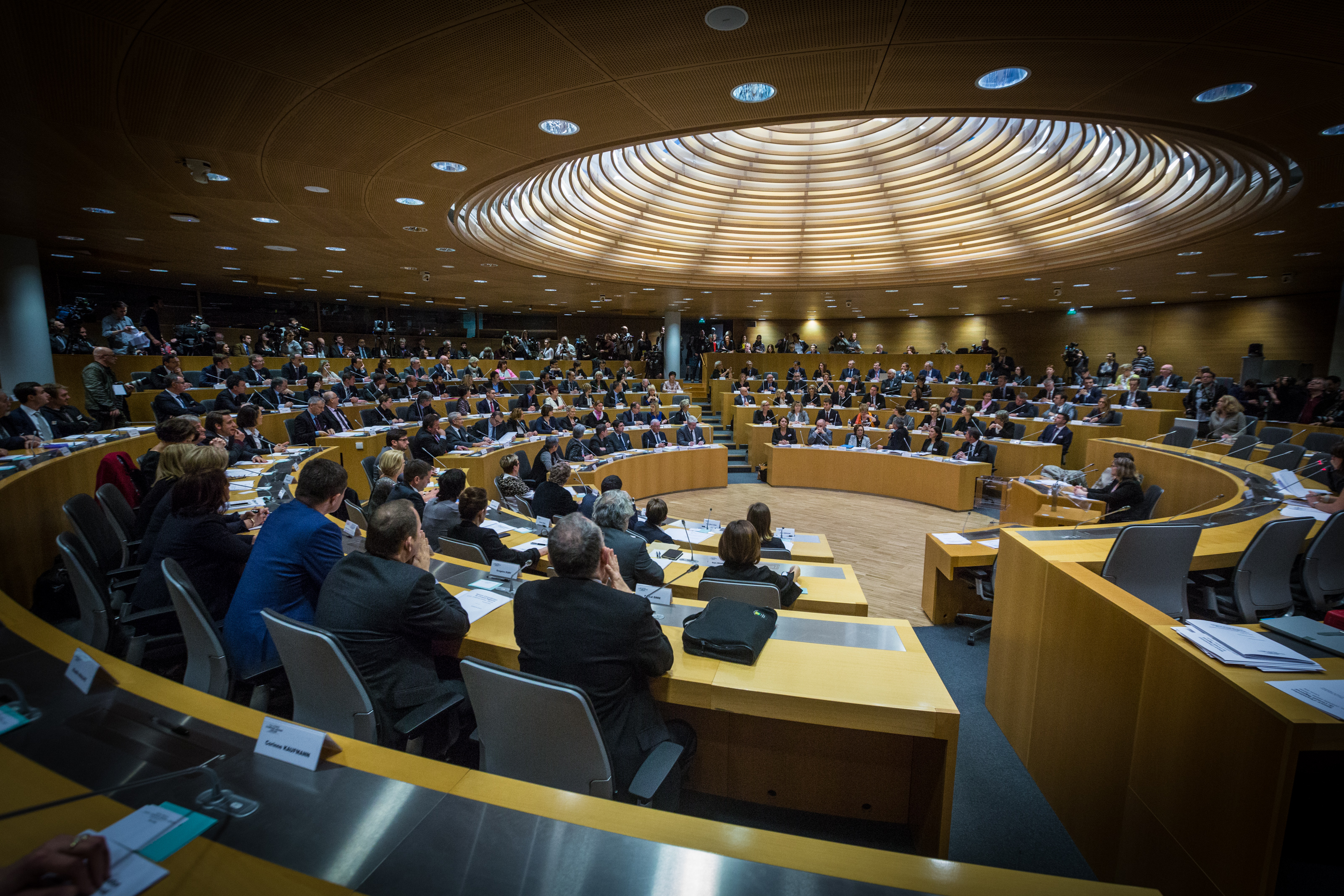
- 1 place Adrien Zeller; BP 91006 – 67070 Strasbourg cedex
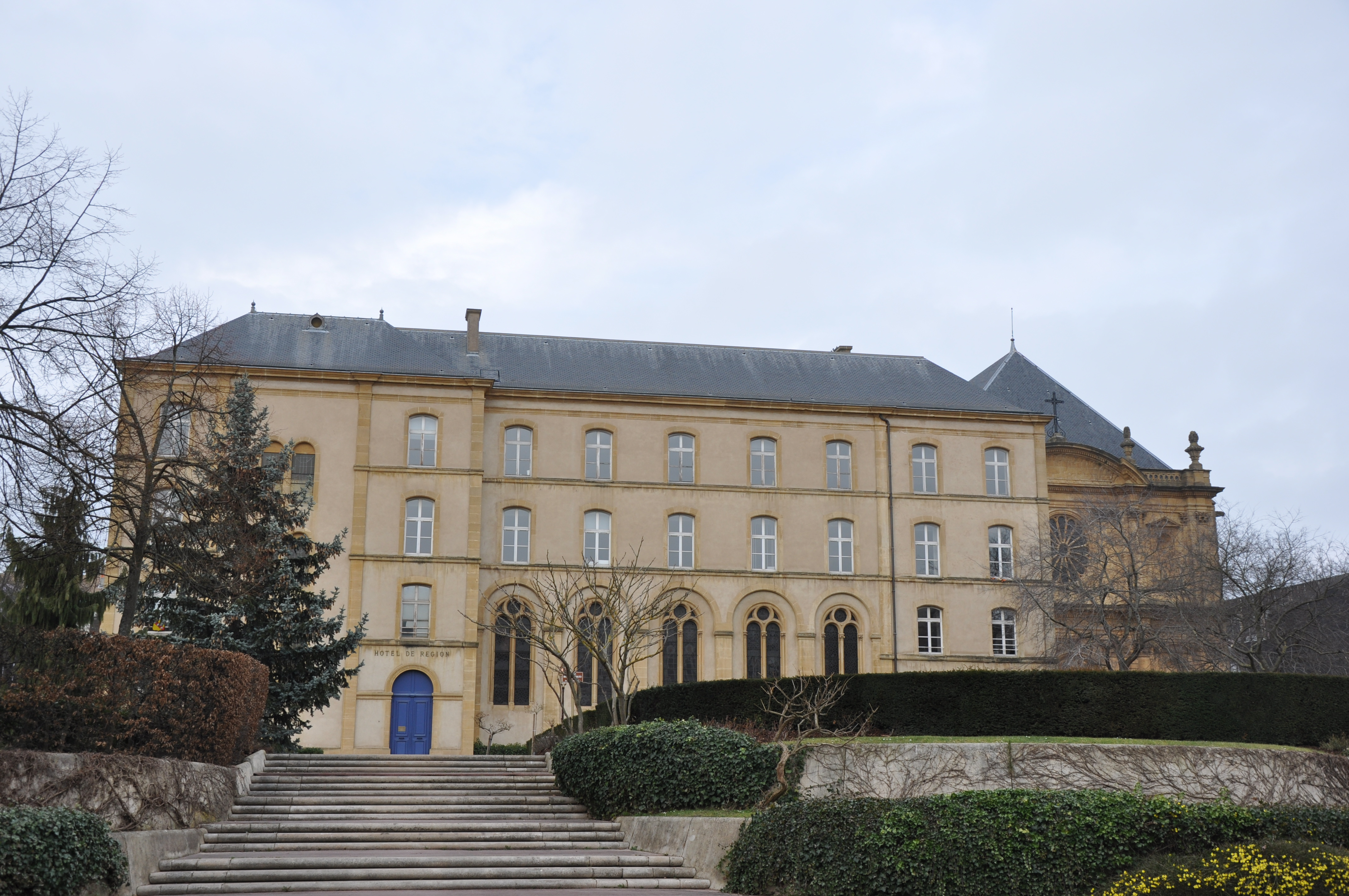
- 1 place Gabriel Hocquard; CS 81004 – 57036 Metz cedex 01
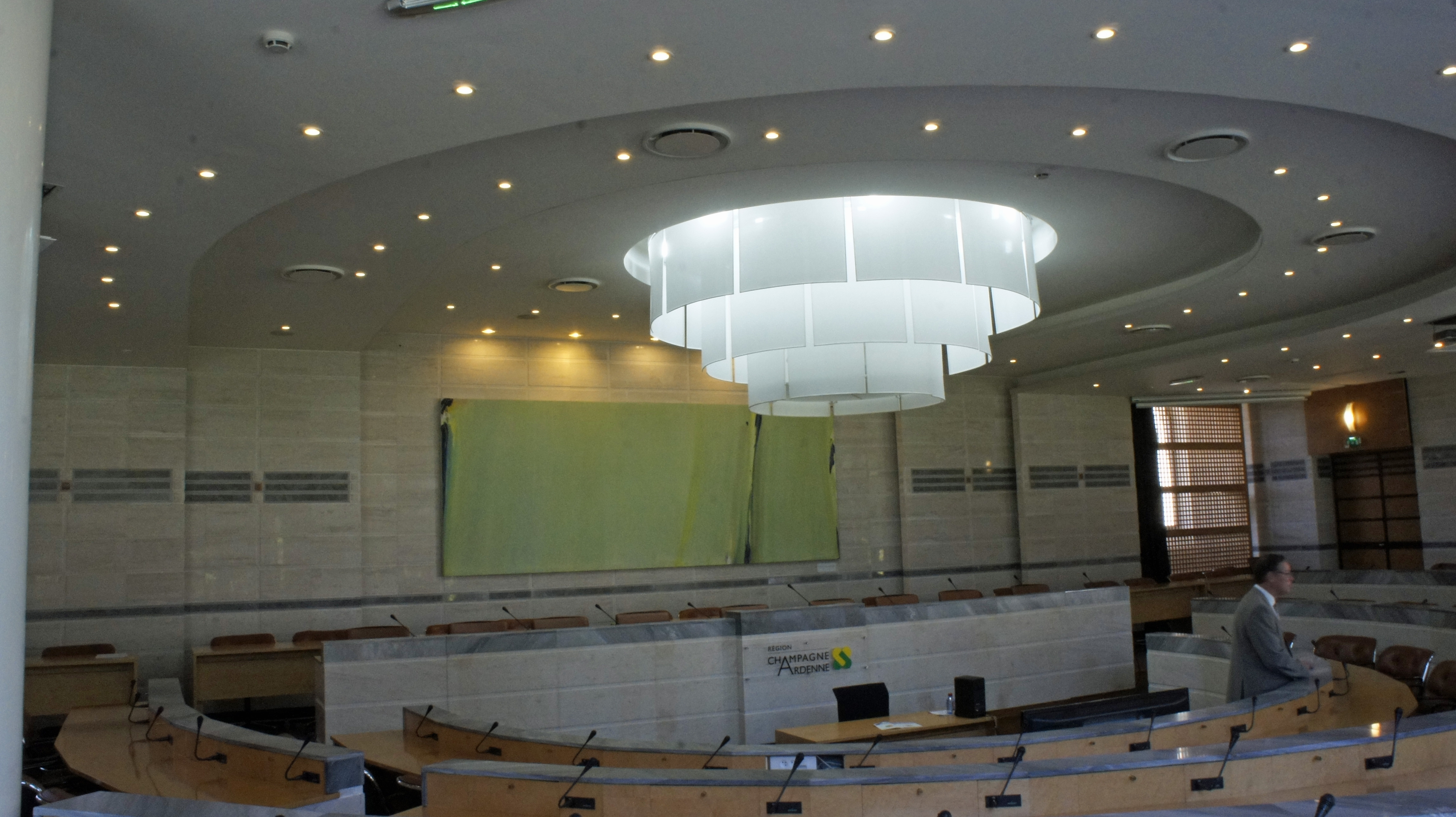
- 5 rue de Jéricho; CS 70441 – 51037 Châlons-en-Champagne cedex

Website
- www.grandest.fr

The Regional Council of Grand Est (French: conseil régional du Grand Est), formerly the regional council of Alsace-Champagne-Ardenne-Lorraine (French: conseil régional d'Alsace-Champagne-Ardenne-Lorraine), is the deliberative assembly of the region of Grand Est. Jean Rottner of The Republicans (LR) is the current president of the regional council. He was elected on 20 October 2017, following the retirement of Philippe Richert on 30 September 2017.

== History ==
The regional council of Grand Est, previously Alsace-Champagne-Ardenne-Lorraine, was created by the act on the delimitation of regions, regional and departmental elections and amending the electoral calendar of 16 January 2015, which went into effect on 1 January 2016 and merged the regional councils of Alsace, Champagne-Ardenne, and Lorraine, consisting of 47, 49, and 73 regional councillors, respectively, into a single body with 169 regional councillors, following regional elections on 6 and 13 December 2015. The number of representatives elected for these three former regions was recalculated as a result of the reform, with Alsace electing 59 seats, Champagne-Ardenne electing 38 seats, and Lorraine electing 72 seats.

== Seat ==
The merger of the regions of Alsace, Champagne-Ardenne, and Lorraine necessitated the redistribution of administrative functions between the seats of the former regions. Philippe Richert, president of the newly unified region, proposed designating Strasbourg as the new capital and therefore seat of the regional council, with Strasbourg and Metz sharing the standing committee and plenary assembly. On 12 January 2016, Richert announced that Strasbourg would become the capital of the region and seat of the regional council, standing committee, and thematic committees, while the plenary assembly would convene in Metz. He also stated that there would be a "house of the regional council" in the three former regional capitals, located at 1 place Adrien Zeller in Strasbourg, 1 place Gabriel Hocquard in Metz, and 5 rue de Jéricho in Châlons-en-Champagne. The finance committee of the regional council was also relocated to Châlons-en-Champagne. These proposals were approved at a session of the plenary assembly on 29 April during which regional councillors also agreed to rename the region – then known as Alsace-Champagne-Ardenne-Lorraine – to Grand Est, following an online consultation in which 75% of participants voted in favor.

== Election results ==
=== 2015 regional election ===
The current regional council was elected in regional elections on 6 and 13 December 2015, with the list of Philippe Richert consisting of The Republicans (LR), the Union of Democrats and Independents (UDI), and the Democratic Movement (MoDem) securing an absolute majority of 104 seats. After the first round, Jean-Pierre Masseret of the Socialist Party (PS) refused to withdraw his list before the second round, despite calls by the leadership of the party, as well as a number of members of Masseret's list, to vote for Richert's list in order to stop the National Front from winning the region. As a result, the PS renounced its support for Masseret and stated that he would "not have the Socialist label" in the second round.

Leader	List	First round		Second round		Seats	
Leader	List	Votes	%	Votes	%	Seats	%
Florian Philippot	FN	641,234	36.07	790,166	36.08	46	27.22
Philippe Richert	LR–UDI–MoDem	459,212	25.83	1,060,059	48.40	104	61.54
Jean-Pierre Masseret	PS–PRG	286,390	16.11	339,756	15.51	19	11.24
Sandrine Bélier	EELV	119,091	6.70				
Laurent Jacobelli	DLF	84,886	4.78				
Jean-Georges Trouillet	UL–PM–PL–AEI	84,147	4.73				
Patrick Peron	FG–MRC	57,165	3.22				
Julien Wostyn	LO	26,347	1.48				
David Wentzel	UPR	19,171	1.08				
Total		1,777,643	100.00	2,189,981	100.00	169	100.00
Valid votes		1,777,643	95.49	2,189,981	95.49		
Blank votes		46,404	2.49	52,078	2.27		
Null votes		37,553	2.02	51,315	2.24		
Turnout		1,861,600	47.91	2,293,374	59.02		
Abstentions		2,023,930	52.09	1,592,494	40.98		
Registered voters		3,885,530		3,885,868			
Source: Ministry of the Interior, Le Monde (parties)

== Composition ==
=== Political groups ===
The regional council currently consists of four political groups.

Political group	Members	Parties
Regional majority	94	LR, UDI, DVD
National Rally and related	33	RN
The strength of our territories	15	REM
It is time for ecology and social justice	14	EELV
The left, solidarity and ecology	13	PS, PCF

== Executive ==
=== Presidents ===
President	Party	Term start	Term end
Philippe Richert	LR	4 January 2016	30 September 2017
Jean-Luc Bohl	UDI	30 September 2017	20 October 2017
Jean Rottner	LR	20 October 2017	30 December 2022
Franck Leroy	DVD	13 January 2023	present

On 4 January 2016, Philippe Richert of The Republicans (LR) was elected president of the Alsace-Champagne-Ardenne-Lorraine region with 102 votes, against 46 votes for Florian Philippot of the National Front (FN), 20 blank votes, and 1 abstention, with the left not contesting the ballot.

Candidate	Party	Votes	%
Philippe Richert	LR	102	60.36
Florian Philippot	FN	46	27.22
Total		169	100.00
Abstentions		1	0.59
Votes		168	99.41
Blank and null votes		20	11.83
Valid votes		148	87.57

On 30 September 2017, Philippe Richert of The Republicans (LR), announced his retirement from politics and resigned his post as president of the regional council. He was replaced in the interim by Jean-Luc Bohl of the Union of Democrats and Independents (UDI) until Jean Rottner was elected as his successor on 20 October. He received 96 votes, failing to secure the support of 8 members of his own group, against 35 votes for Virginie Joron of the FN and 1 vote for Christophe Choserot, a member of La République En Marche! elected under the banner of the Socialist Party (PS) sitting with the left in the regional council. A total of 37 blank and null ballots were cast. The Socialist group did not nominate a candidate and instead submitted blank votes, as did the group of The Patriots in the regional council due to a lack of "credible projects", implicitly rejecting the candidacy of Joron.

Candidate	Party	Votes	%
Jean Rottner	LR	96	56.80
Virginie Joron	FN	35	20.71
Christophe Choserot	REM (PS)	1	0.59
Total		169	100.00
Blank and null votes		37	21.89
Valid votes		132	78.11

=== Vice presidents ===
In addition to the president, the executive of the regional council also includes 15 vice presidents delegated to certain policy areas.

Number	Regional councillor	Group	Delegate for	Department
1st vice president	Jean-Luc Bohl	LR–UDI–MoDem	Attractivity and outreach	Moselle
2nd vice president	Christine Guillemy	LR–UDI–MoDem	Initial training, lycée and apprenticeship	Haute-Marne
3rd vice president	David Valence	LR–UDI–MoDem	Transport, travel and infrastructure	Vosges
4th vice president	Lilla Merabet	LR–UDI–MoDem	Competitiveness, digital sector and excellence	Bas-Rhin
5th vice president	Marc Sebeyran	LR–UDI–MoDem	Finance, management control, public procurement	Aube
6th vice president	Valérie Debord	LR–UDI–MoDem	Employment	Meurthe-et-Moselle
7th vice president	Xavier Albertini	LR–UDI–MoDem	Strategy and forecasting	Marne
8th vice president	Elsa Schalck	LR–UDI–MoDem	Youth and guidance, engagement, citizenship and territorial democracy	Bas-Rhin
9th vice president	Philippe Mangin	LR–UDI–MoDem	Bioeconomy, agribusiness and bioenergy	Meuse
10th vice president	Nicole Muller-Becker	LR–UDI–MoDem	Cross-border cooperation and development of multilingualism	Moselle
11th vice president	Jean-Paul Omeyer	LR–UDI–MoDem	Sport	Haut-Rhin
12th vice president	Pascale Gaillot	LR–UDI–MoDem	Agriculture and rurality	Ardennes
13th vice president	Franck Leroy	LR–UDI–MoDem	Territorial cohesion, contractualization and balance of territories	Marne
14th vice president	Christèle Willer	LR–UDI–MoDem	Ecological and energy transition	Haut-Rhin
15th vice president	François Werner	LR–UDI–MoDem	Coordination of European policy, higher education and research	Meurthe-et-Moselle

== Committees ==
The regional council includes 14 thematic committees which submit deliberations related to various policy areas.

Committee	President	Group	Department
Finance	Jean-Pierre Liouville	PS	Moselle
International and cross-border relations	Claudine Ganter	LR–UDI–MoDem	Haut-Rhin
Transport and travel	Evelyne Isinger	LR–UDI–MoDem	Bas-Rhin
Vocational training	Véronique Marchet	LR–UDI–MoDem	Marne
Lycées and apprenticeship	Atissar Hibour	LR–UDI–MoDem	Meuse
Youth	Cédric Chevalier	LR–UDI–MoDem	Marne
Economic development	Isabelle Héliot-Couronne	LR–UDI–MoDem	Aube
Innovation, higher education and research	Rémy Sadocco	LR–UDI–MoDem	Moselle
Agriculture and forestry	Patrick Bastian	LR–UDI–MoDem	Bas-Rhin
Spatial planning	Martine Lizola	LR–UDI–MoDem	Marne
Environment	Christian Guirlinger	LR–UDI–MoDem	Meurthe-et-Moselle
Culture	Pascal Mangin	LR–UDI–MoDem	Bas-Rhin
Sport	Thierry Hory	LR–UDI–MoDem	Moselle
Tourism	Jackie Helfgott	LR–UDI–MoDem	Moselle
