= Regional Council of Champagne-Ardenne =

Former regional legislature in France

Regional Council of Champagne-Ardenne Conseil régional de Champagne-Ardenne
- Flag of Champagne-Ardenne

Type
- Type: Unicameral
- Seats: 49

Meeting place
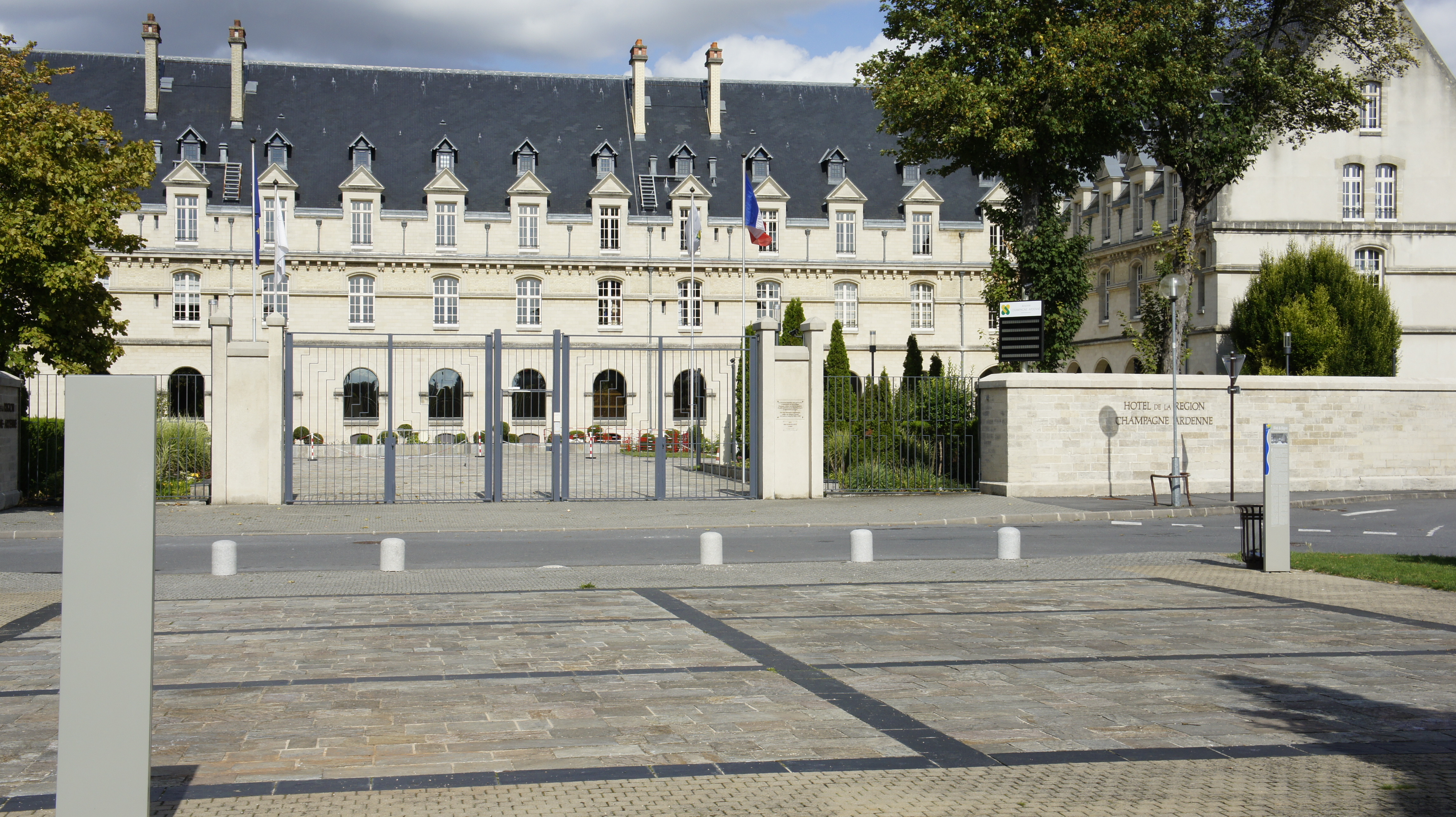
- Hôtel de région de Champagne-Ardenne

The Regional Council of Champagne-Ardenne was the deliberative assembly of the former region of Champagne-Ardenne incorporated in the Grand Est region on 1 January 2016. It was headquartered in Châlons-en-Champagne, at 5 rue de Jéricho at Hôtel de region de Champagne-Ardenne, from 1982 to 2015.

== Presidents of the Regional Council ==
President	Party	Term	Reference
Jacques Sourdille	UDR	1974 - 1981	
Bernard Stasi	UDF	1981 - 1988	
Jean Kaltenbach	RPR	1988 - 1998	
Jean-Claude Étienne	RPR	1998 - 2004	
Jean-Paul Bachy	PS	2004 - 2015	

== Composition of the Regional Council (2010-2015) ==
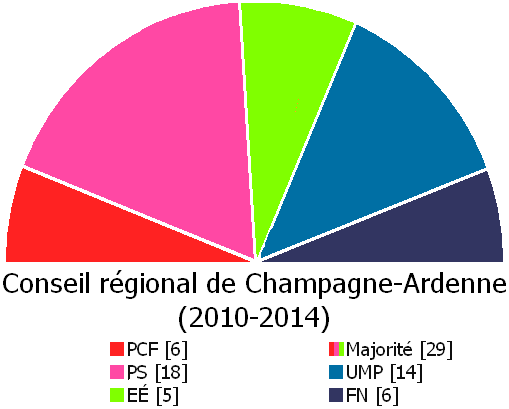
Composition of the regional council since the 2010 elections

The regional council has 49 regional advisers:

- French Communist Party: 6 elected
- Socialist Party: 18 elected
- Europe Ecology: 5 elected
- Union for a Popular Movement - New Center : 14 elected
- National Front: 6 elected

List of vice-presidents
Order	Name	Charge(s)
1st	Gérard Berthiot	Health, sanitary and social affairs
2nd	Sylvie Cotillot	High schools and apprenticeship
3rd	Yves Fournier	Territorial policies
4th	Claudine Ledoux	International relations, European issues and cross-border cooperation
5th	Pierre Mathieu	Infrastructure and transport
6th	Jacques Meyer	Higher education, research and sport
7th	Michèle Leflon	Vocational training, integration and employment
8th	Roland Daverdon	Sustainable development, the environment, agriculture and forestry
9th	Nathalie Dahm	Cultural life and heritage.
10th	Jaim Myara	Economic development, job creation and social and solidarity economy

== Headquarters ==
The Regional Council occupied the old enclosure which consisted of the major and minor seminary of Châlons. The renovation took place in two stages, the first aimed at rehabilitating the major seminary where the council sat for the plenary session and the Economic and Social Council. The garden and the minor seminary were rehabilitated for the beginning of 2015.

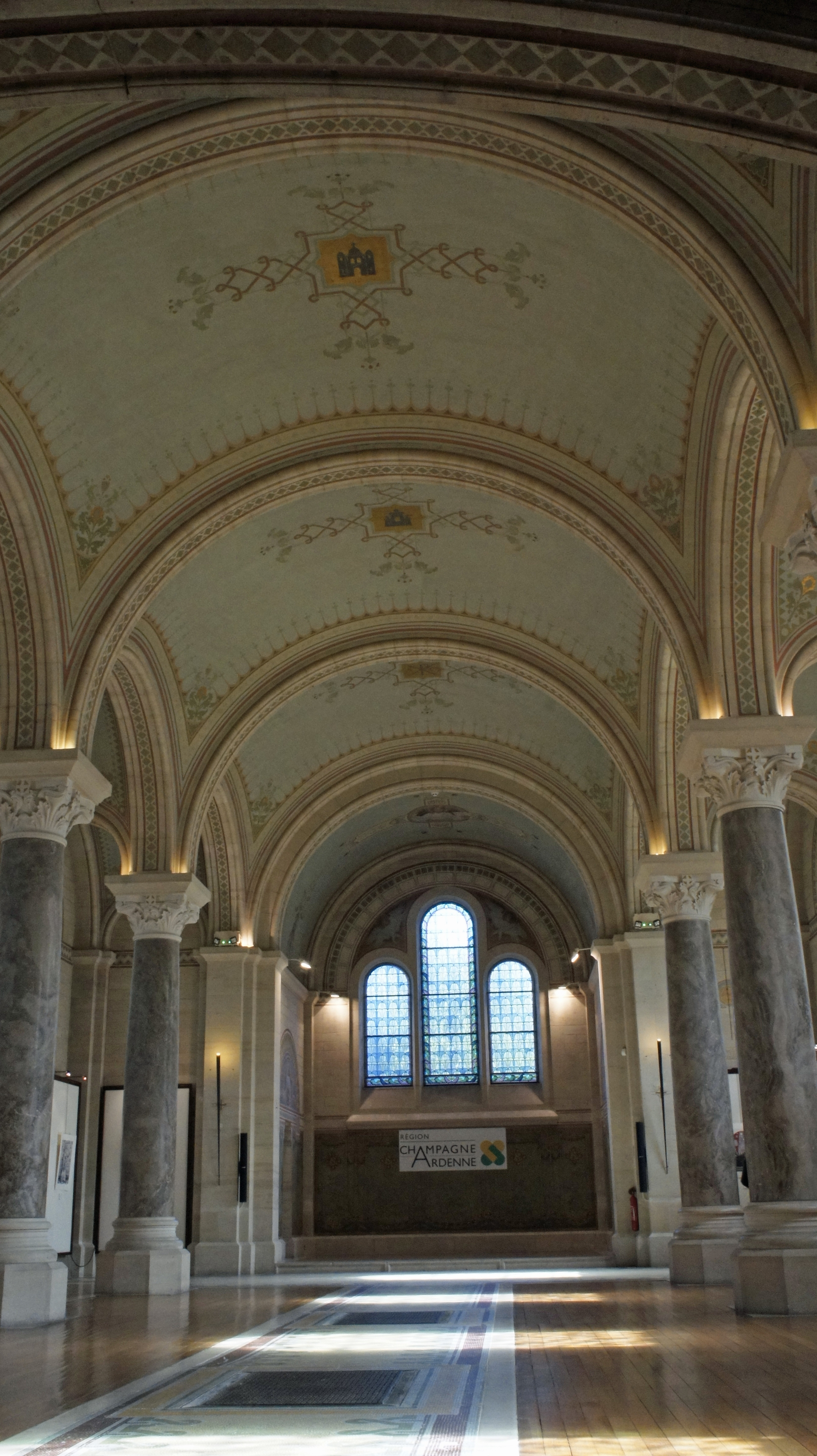
The chapel

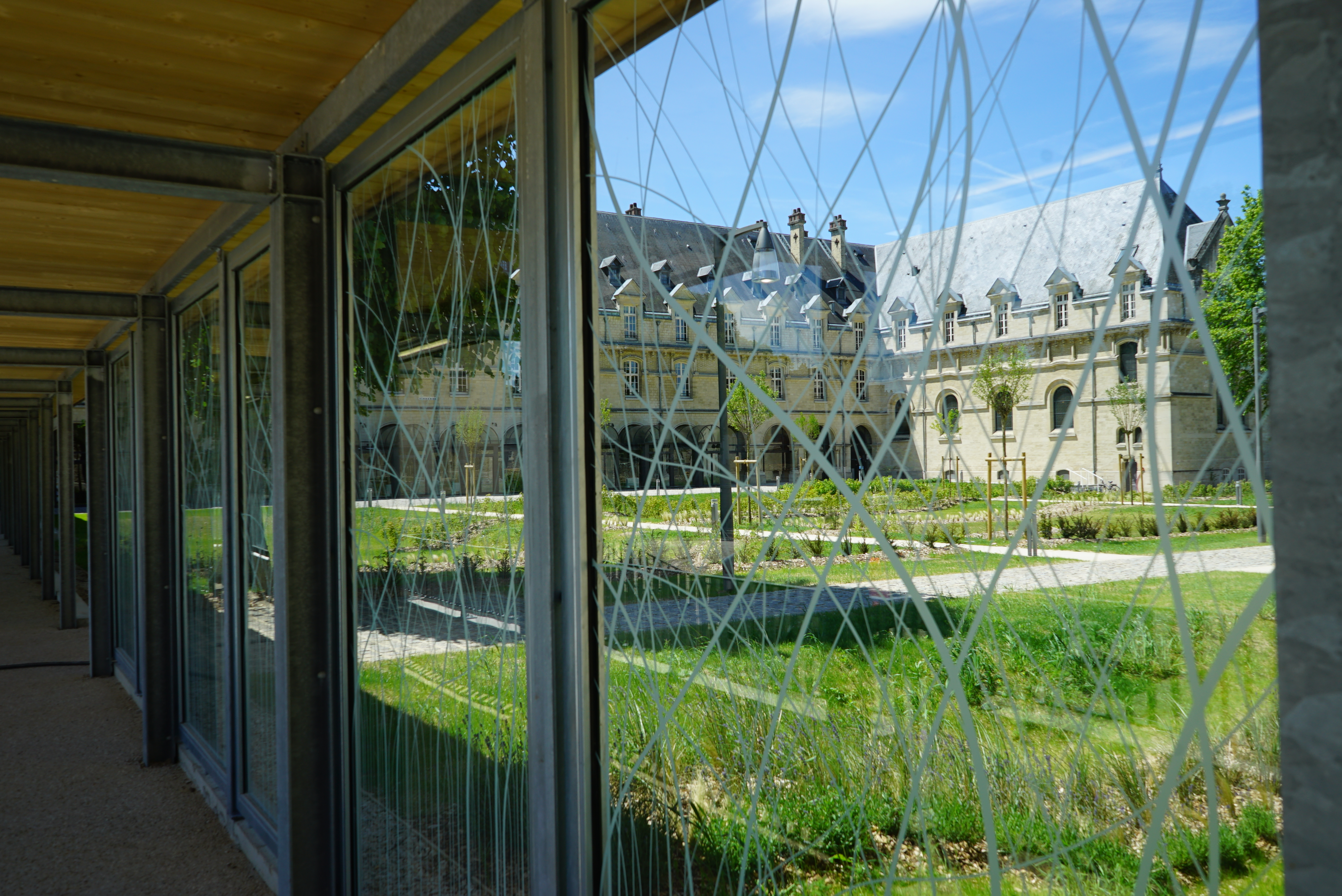
Garden and major seminary

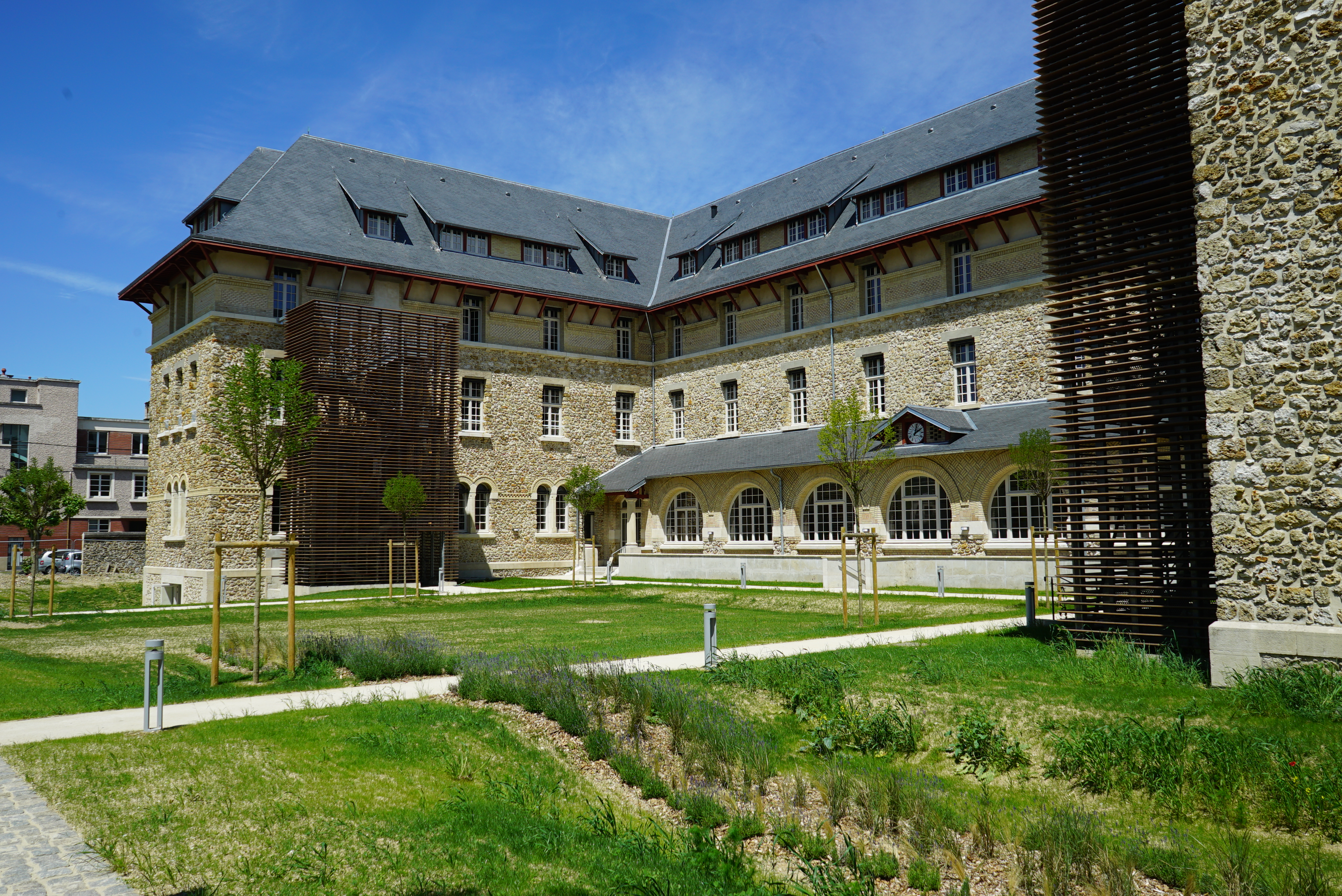
Minor seminary
