= Trams in Caen (1860-1937) =

First generation tram system in Caen, France (1860-1937)

Trams in Caen was the former public transit system serving the city of Caen, France. The original tramway network, operated by Compagnie des tramways électriques de Caen opened in 1901 and closed on 23 January 1937, after which buses took over as the primary means of public transport in Caen (until the 2002 opening of Caen Guided Light Transit replaced by the Caen tramway in 2019).

Public transport began in 1860 with a horse omnibus service; in 1895, the Compagnie des Omnibus et Transports à chevaux was created to provide an organised urban transport service to the inhabitants of Caen.

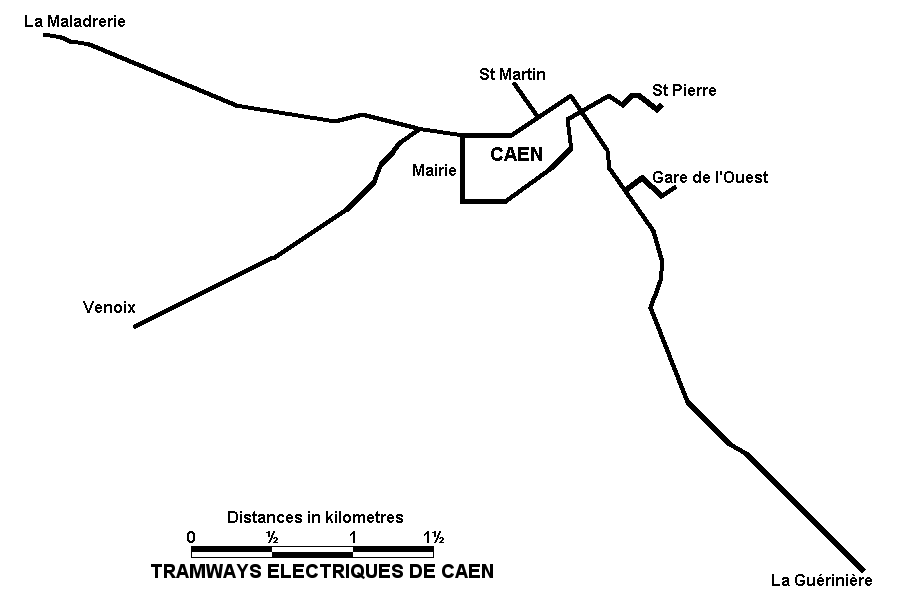
Tramways of Caen network plan.

== Network ==
The network of 1,000 mm (3 ft 3 3/8 in) narrow gauge lines spread over 11 km and all three lines opened in 1901, connecting the Route de Falaise (La Guérinière), Caen-Ouest Station, Saint Pierre, Place du Canada (Saint Martin), La Maladrerie and Venoix. The depot was situated on the Eastern side of the Bassin Saint Pierre, in the city centre of Caen, with the tram lines crossing the Calvados' line to Ouistreham.

While the tramway closed on 23 January 1937, the tracks remained for several years after that.

== Rolling stock ==
The company operated a fleet of single car trams as well as trailers.

== See also ==
- Caen tramway
