= Regional Council of Alsace =

Regional legislature in France

Regional Council of Alsace Conseil régional d'Alsace (French)
- Logo of the Council

History
- Disbanded: 31 December 2015
- Succeeded by: Regional Council of Grand Est

Leadership
- President: Philippe Richert, UMP; 2010-2015

Meeting place
- Hôtel de la région Alsace, Strasbourg

The Regional Council of Alsace (French: Conseil régional d'Alsace, Alsatian: Regionalrööt vum Elsass) was the regional council of the French region of Alsace from 1982 to 2015. As a result of reforms, the administrative region of Alsace merged with two other regions to form Grand Est, effective 1 January 2016, at which point the regional councils of Alsace, Lorraine, and Champagne-Ardenne were superseded by the Regional Council of Grand Est.

== Composition (by party) ==
=== 2004 ===
Party	Seats
Union for a Popular Movement	18
Socialist Party	8
National Front	8
Union for French Democracy	7
The Greens	4
Miscellaneous right	2

=== 1998 ===
Party	Seats
National Front	13
Union for French Democracy	9
Socialist Party	8
Rally for the Republic	7
Miscellaneous right	3
Alsace d'Abord	3
Femmes d'Alsace	2
Independent Ecological Movement	1
The Greens	1

=== 1992 ===
Party	Seats
Rally for the Republic-Union for French Democracy	20
National Front	9
The Greens	6
Socialist Party	6
Alsace d'Abord	2
Femmes d'Alsace	1
Ecology Generation	3

=== 1986 ===
Party	Seats
Rally for the Republic-Union for French Democracy	27
Socialist Party	11
National Front	7
The Greens	2

== Former presidents ==
- André Bord (1974–1976)
- Pierre Schiélé (1976–1980)
- Marcel Rudloff (1980–1996)
- Adrien Zeller (1996–2009)
- André Reichardt (2009–2010)
- Philippe Richert (2010–2015)
