= Caen Guided Light Transit =

Former tram system in Caen, France (2002–2017)

Caen guided light transit
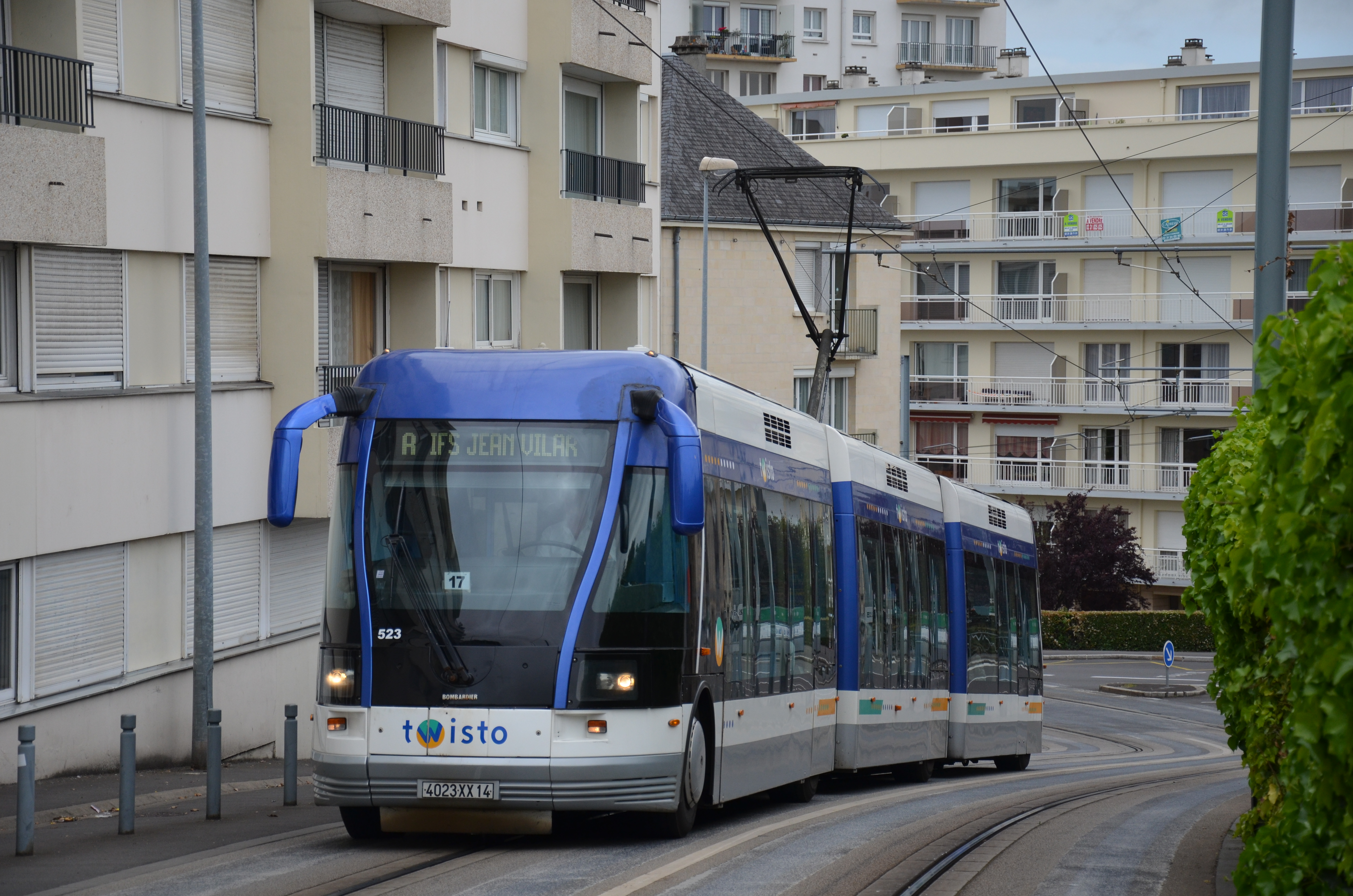

Overview
- Native name: Tramway de Caen
- Locale: Caen, Normandy, France
- Transit type: GLT/TVR, a type of guided bus
- Number of lines: 2
- Number of stations: 34
- Daily ridership: 42,000 (2008)

Operation
- Began operation: 18 November 2002; 24 years ago
- Ended operation: 31 December 2017; 8 years ago
- Operator: Twisto

Technical
- System length: 15.7 km (9.8 mi)
- Track gauge: Central guideway with rubber tyres
System map

The Caen guided light transit or Caen TVR, locally known as "the Tram", was an electrically powered guided bus system in Caen, France, which used Bombardier Guided Light Transit (TVR in French) technology.

After a construction time lasting three years, the system opened on 18 November 2002 at a total cost of 227 million euros. The Caen transport company, Twisto (CTAC), was the operator of the TVR system and called the system the "Tram".

Service was provided by 24 three-section articulated vehicles, guided by a central non-supporting rail. The entire passenger line was guided, and in normal service the vehicles were powered by electricity drawn from an overhead wire through a pantograph. The vehicles had auxiliary diesel engines and steering wheels and were able to operate away from the guide rail, but only in diesel mode, and under normal operating conditions they ran only in electric mode when carrying passengers along the route, using their diesel engines only when travelling to and from the depot (garage). The use of pantographs for current collection meant the Caen vehicles could not move laterally away from the overhead wire when operating in electric mode, and for this reason they were not considered to be trolleybuses, under the English language meaning of that word, and the system is sometimes referred to as a "rubber-tyred tramway".

The system closed on 31 December 2017 to allow for the construction of a new tramway using conventional street railway technology. The new system opened in 2019 and covers the same route as the TVR, but has since been extended.

== History ==
In 1988, the SMTCAC (Syndicat Mixte des Transports en Commun de l'Agglomération Caennaise) first considered developing higher-order public transit systems. However, the opening of the bus system was not without problems as well as lack of interest in the system by the population with only 23% backing the project, in 1994, Viacités, one of the guided bus' network partners closed a contract with the consortium STVR (Société the transport sur Voie Réservée), existing construction company Spie Batignolles and Bombardier Transportation proceeded with infrastructure and vehicle construction. Due to financial contracts the municipality had no other choice but to push the project forward despite a relative lobby against the tram.

== Network ==
The total network was 15.7 kilometres long and comprised two lines, A and B, with a 5.7-kilometre (3.5 mi) common section running north–south in central Caen. The central section, between Copernic and Poincaré, encompassed 15 stops. The entire network served a total of 34 stops. There were plans for a second line running from east to west.

The tram served 40% of the public transport trips, 70 000 inhabitants and 60 000 jobs situated within 400m of the line.

Service frequency was high (3.5 to 7 minutes between vehicles) and operated between 05:30 and 00:30. Speed was 30% higher than conventional buses and stops were never more than 450 m apart.

=== Construction ===
- D-850 (April 2000): Beginning of construction.
- D-730 (15 September 2000): Beginning of trackbed construction.
- D-120 (May 2002): Rolling stock tests.
- D-60 (15 July 2002): First test run.
- D Day (18 November 2002): Beginning of commercial operation (three days after an inauguration ceremony).

=== Safety ===
The system had been plagued with faults, due to design and operation; on 21 October 2004 a young boy named Nathan was run over and killed by a TVR vehicle in Rue Roger-Bastion. The vehicle, being bus-based, restricted to its guiding rail and lacking grip to brake in time, could not avoid the 11-year-old.

== Rolling stock ==
Service was provided by Bombardier GLT guided buses, each 24.5 m (80 ft 4 5/8 in) long and 3.4 m (11 ft 1 7/8 in) high, and weighing 38 t (37.4 long tons; 41.9 short tons). Their top speed was 70 km/h (43 mph).

Upon the closure of the system, 12 vehicles were transferred to the Nancy Guided Light Transit for use as spare parts donors. until the system there was closed in 2023.

== Replacement with light rail ==
Viacités confirmed on 14 December 2011 its plans to abandon the TVR in favour of a tramway by 2019, due to its unreliability.

The light rail was set take 18 months to construct and has an approximately €170 million price tag. The conversion to light rail also meant the termination of two concession contracts that Keolis and Bombardier-Spie Batignolles consortium STVR hold. In late 2014, the French government pledged €23.3 million towards Caen's light rail conversion project, which was expected to cost approximately €230 million.

The new tramway which opened on 27 July 2019 follows the same route as the old system, including a new branch Presqu'île.

== See also ==
- List of rubber-tyred tram systems
- Nancy Guided Light Transit
- Trams in France
