= Jean Rottner =

French politician

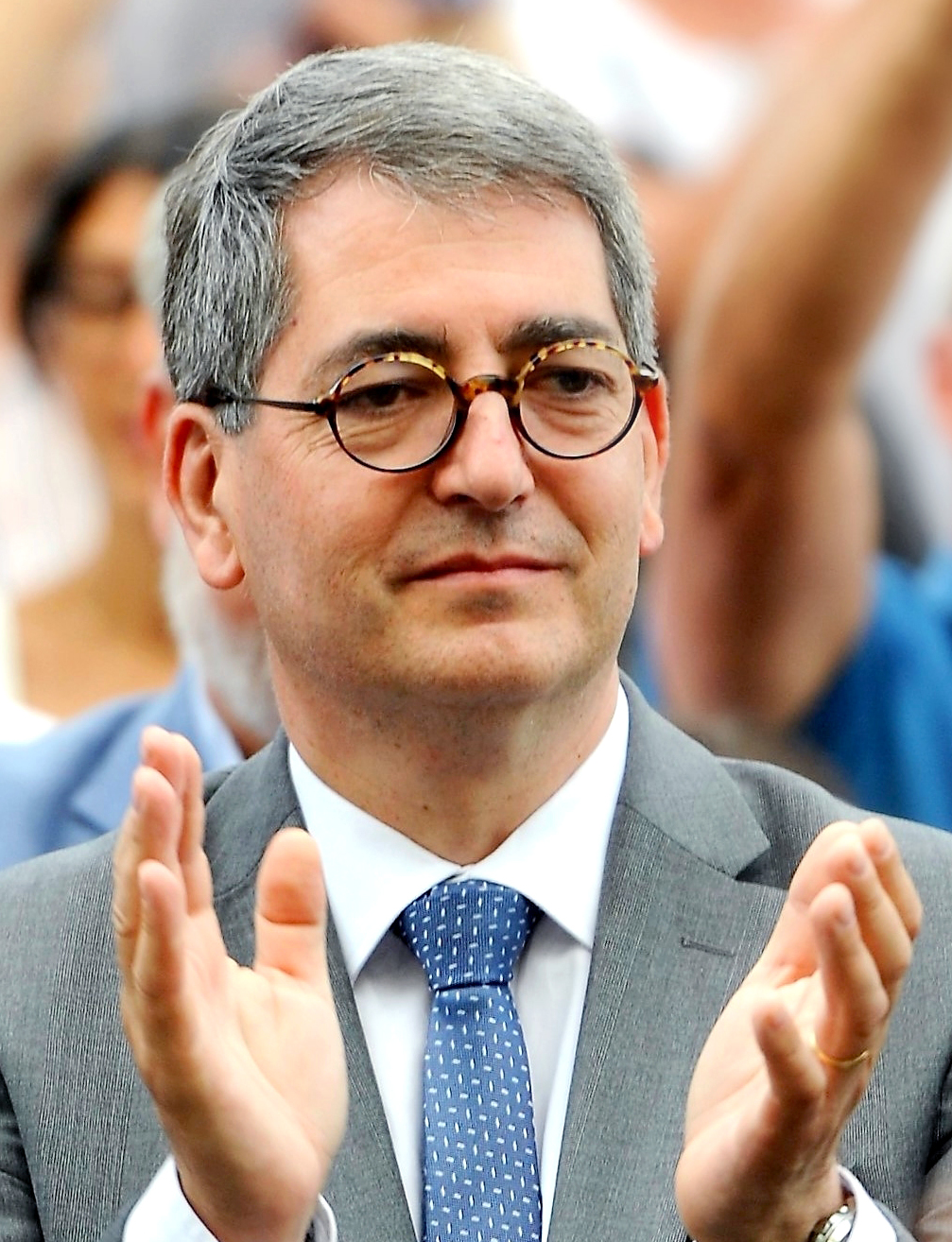
- Jean Rottner in 2019.

President of the Regional council of Grand Est
- In office 20 October 2017 – 30 December 2022
- Preceded by: Philippe Richert
- Succeeded by: Franck Leroy

Mayor of Mulhouse
- In office 2010–2017
- Preceded by: Jean-Marie Bockel
- Succeeded by: Michèle Lutz

Personal details
- Born: 28 January 1967 (age 59) Mulhouse, France
- Party: The Republicans
- Education: University of Strasbourg

Jean Rottner (French pronunciation: [ʒɑ̃ ʁɔtnɛʁ]; born 28 January 1967) is a French politician of the political party The Republicans who was mayor of Mulhouse from 2010 to 2017, and was President of the regional council of Grand Est from 2017 to 2022.

Born as a son of teachers, Jean Rottner studied medicine at the University of Strasbourg.
