= Philippe Richert =

French politician

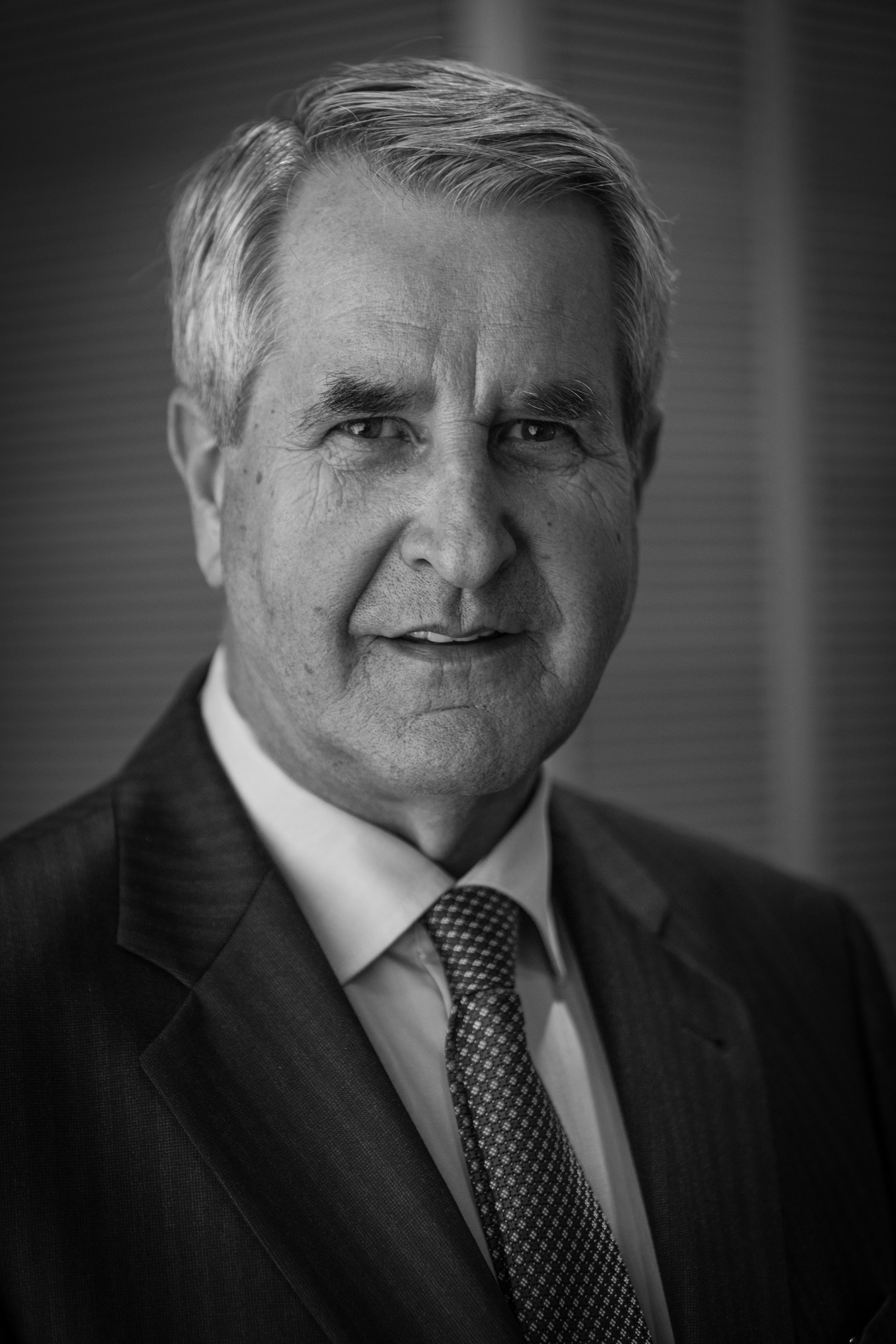

President of the Regional council of Grand Est
- In office 4 January 2016 – 30 September 2017
- Preceded by: New title
- Succeeded by: Jean Rottner

President of the Regional council of Alsace
- In office 26 March 2010 – 31 December 2015
- Preceded by: André Reichardt
- Succeeded by: Office eliminated

Senator of Bas-Rhin
- In office 2 October 1992 – 14 December 2010

President of the Bas-Rhin Departmental Council
- In office 22 July 1998 – 20 March 2008
- Preceded by: Daniel Hoeffel
- Succeeded by: Guy-Dominique Kennel

Personal details
- Born: 22 May 1953 (age 73) Ingwiller, France
- Party: The Republicans
- Spouse: Louise Richert
- Education: Louis Pasteur University

Philippe Richert (born 22 May 1953) is a French politician of The Republicans party (known as the Union for a Popular Movement until 2015), who served as president of the regional council of Grand Est from 2016 to 2017. He previously was the president of the regional council of Alsace, until its dissolution on 1 January 2016.

From 1992 to 2010, Richert was a member of the Senate of France, representing the Bas-Rhin department, and was nominated as the responsible for the relations between the French Senate and the Israeli Knesset. He was Minister for Local authorities under the Minister of Interior, Overseas, Local authorities and Immigration from 14 November 2010 to 10 May 2012. He began his political career as a member of the Bas-Rhin Departmental Council, representing the La Petite Pierre canton. Mr. Richert is also the president of the Lalique Museum in Wingen-sur-Moder.

== Works ==
- Wimmenau, histoire d'une communauté villageoise des Vosges du Nord [Wimmenau, History of a Village in the Northern Vosges] (in French). Strasbourg: Éditions du Rhin. 2009. ISBN 2-7165-0567-5.
- Passion d'Alsace, pour une région audacieuse et unie [Passion for Alsace, for an audacious and united region] (in French). Strasbourg: La Nuée bleue. 2009. ISBN 978-2-7165-0746-2.
