= Caen tramway =

Present tram system in Caen, France

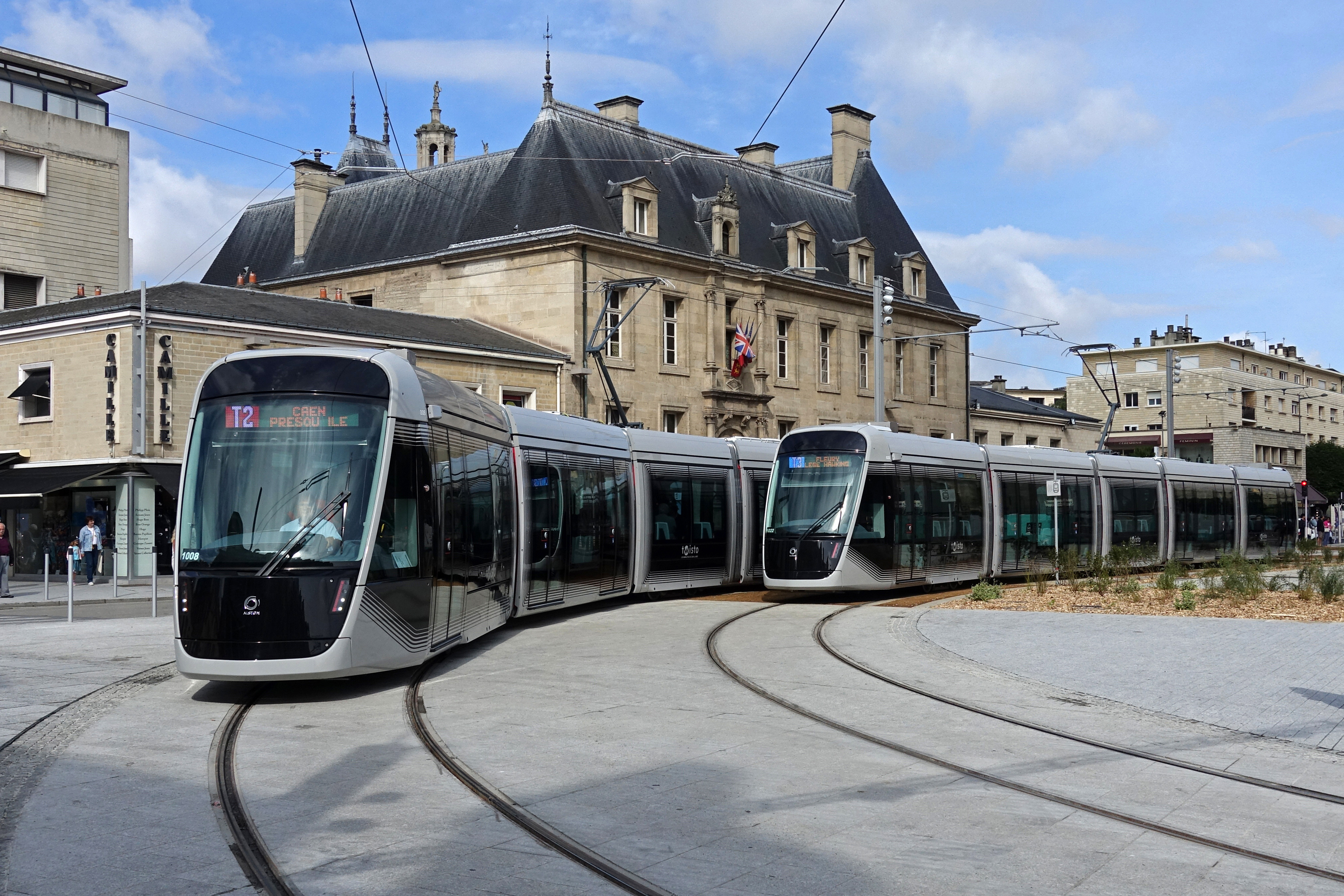

Overview
- Native name: Tramway de Caen
- Owner: Caen la Mer
- Locale: Caen, Normandy, France
- Transit type: Tram
- Number of lines: 3
- Number of stations: 37
- Daily ridership: 50,600 (2022)

Operation
- Began operation: 27 July 2019
- Operator: Twisto
- Rolling stock: 36 × Alstom Citadis 305
- Headway: 10 minutes

Technical
- System length: 16.2 km (10.1 mi)
- Track gauge: 1,435 mm (4 ft 8 1/2 in) standard gauge
- Electrification: 750 V DC from overhead catenary
System map

The Caen tramway (French: Tramway de Caen) is a tram in the city of Caen, France. The tram opened on 27 July 2019 and replaced the troubled Caen Guided Light Transit (TVR) guided bus system, which closed in December 2017. The tramway uses the same route as the TVR, with a short new branch to Presqu'île and a new tram depot in Fleury-sur-Orne.

== History ==
The Caen Guided Light Transit (Caen TVR) opened in 2002 after 3 years of construction.

Viacités confirmed on 14 December 2011 its plans to abandon the TVR in favour of a conventional tramway by 2019, due to its unreliability. The conversion to light rail also included the termination of two concession contracts that Keolis and Bombardier-Spie Batignolles consortium STVR hold. In late 2014, the French government pledged €23.3 million towards Caen's light rail conversion project, estimated to cost approximately €230 million.

In December 2017, the TVR closed and construction work began. The new tramway opened on 27 July 2019.

== Network ==
=== Line T1 ===
The Line T1 connects Hérouville-Saint-Clair and Ifs. It is 10.7 km (6.6 mi) long and has 25 stations. From Monday to Friday, the frequency of trams is 10 minutes between 7am and 7pm.

=== Line T2 ===
The Line T2 connects the north of Caen and its Presqu'Île. It is 6.6 km (4.1 mi) long and has 17 stations. From Monday to Friday, the frequency is 10 minutes between 7am and 7pm.

=== Line T3 ===
The Line T3 connects Caen and Fleury-sur-Orne. It is 5.3 km (3.3 mi) long and has 15 stations. From Monday to Friday, the frequency is 10 minutes between 7am and 7pm. An extension to Fleury - Hauts-de-l'Orne opened on 29 August 2022.

== Future project ==
On 9 March 2021, it was announced that a new line will serve the west of Caen by 2028. This new line, named Line T4, will connect the Presqu'Île of Caen and Saint-Contest whereas the Line T3 will be modified and will serve the Théâtre de Caen, the Hôtel de Ville, the Lycée Malherbe, the Zénith de Caen, the new Palais des Sports, the Stade de Venoix, the Stade Michel d'Ornano until the terminus at Bretteville-sur-Odon - Pompidou and 17 new stations will be built. In addition, 10 new trams were delivered in early 2024. In November 2024, it was announced that the extension will be postponed to 2029.. On 7 April 2026, works for the extension begins.

== See also ==
- Caen Guided Light Transit
- List of town tramway systems in France
- Trams in Caen
