= Nancy Guided Light Transit =

Former guided trolleybus system in Nancy, France

Nancy guided light transit
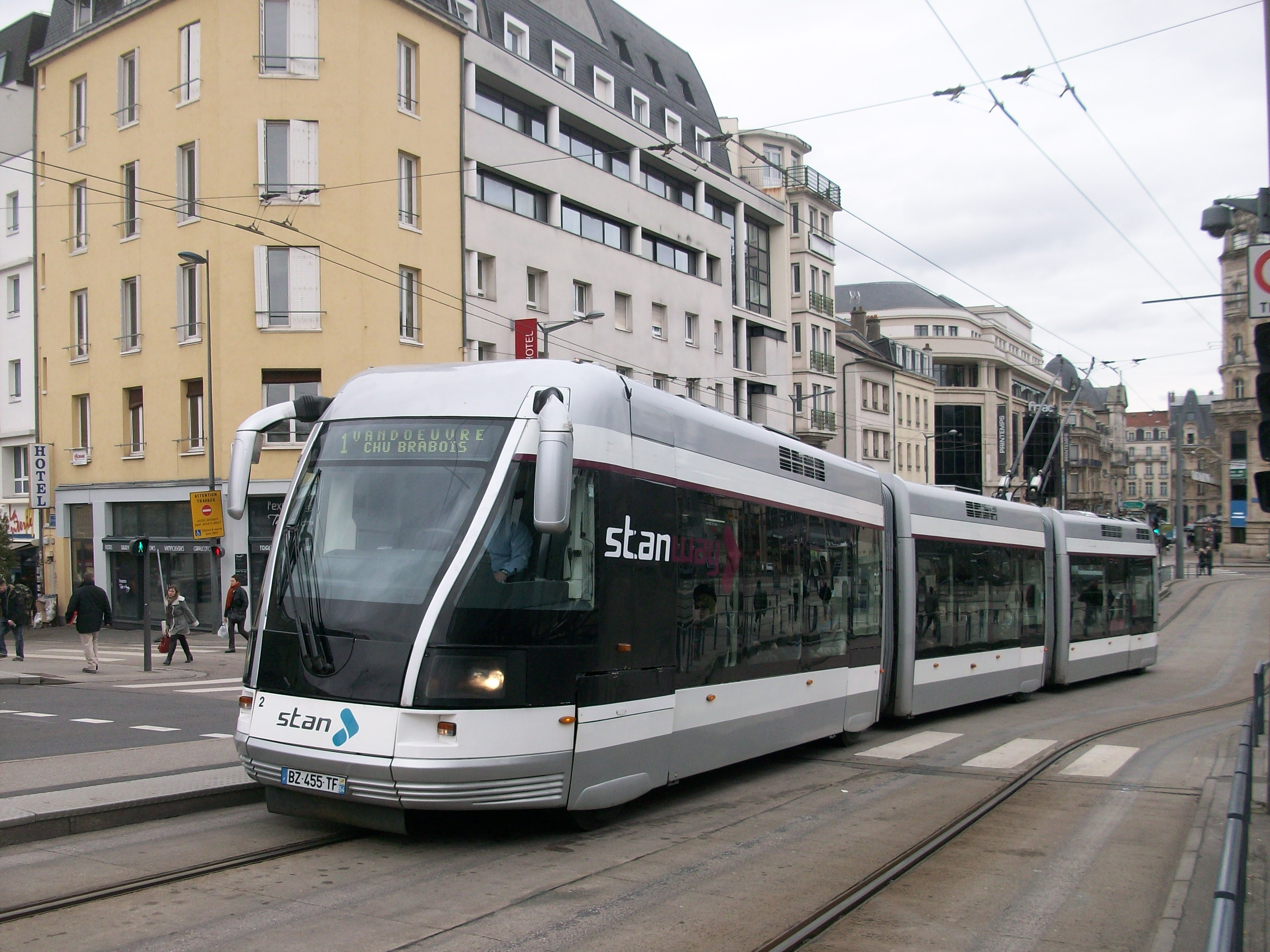
- Nancy TVR in 2015

Overview
- Native name: Tramway de Nancy
- Locale: Nancy, Lorraine
- Transit type: Rubber-tyred tram dual-mode bus trolleybus
- Number of lines: 1
- Number of stations: 28
- Daily ridership: 45.000 daily

Operation
- Began operation: 8 December 2000
- Ended operation: 12 March 2023; 3 years ago
- Operator: Service de Transport de l'Agglomération Nancéienne (STAN)

Technical
- System length: 10 km (6.2 mi)

The Nancy Guided Light Transit or TVR was a guided trolleybus system in Nancy, France. The system used Bombardier's TVR (French: Transport sur Voie Réservée) technology. It encompassed one era, from 2000 to 2023, of the Nancy trolleybus system and replaced the conventional trolleybus service in Nancy during that period. The GLT/TVR system was closed on 12 March 2023 and it was decided to replace it with conventional trolleybuses serving the same route. The new system was opened on 5 April 2025.

== Vehicles ==
The system used rubber-tyred, three-section articulated vehicles. The vehicles used trolley poles to collect current from parallel overhead lines, and also ran independently without the central guide rail.

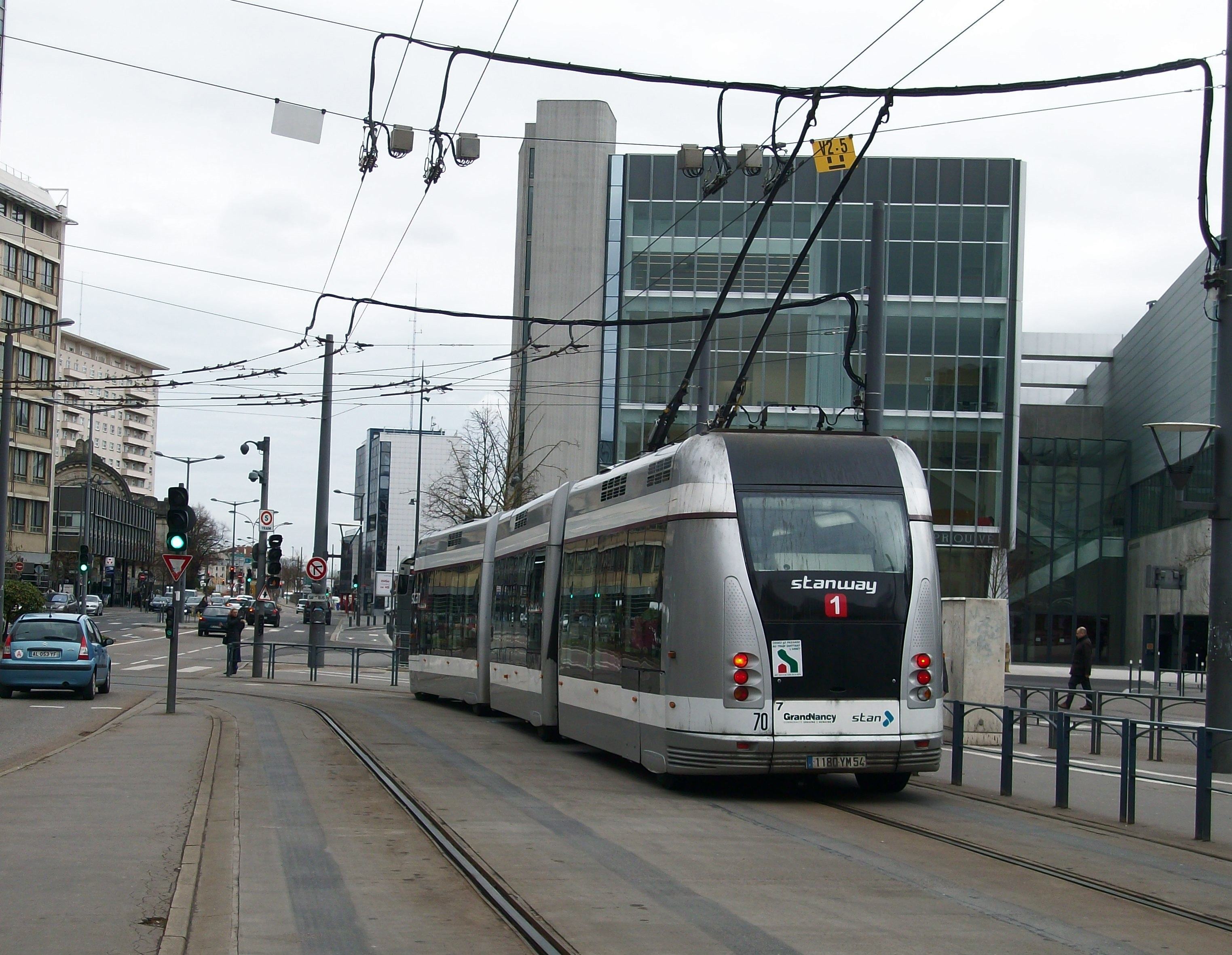
TVR running with central guide rail

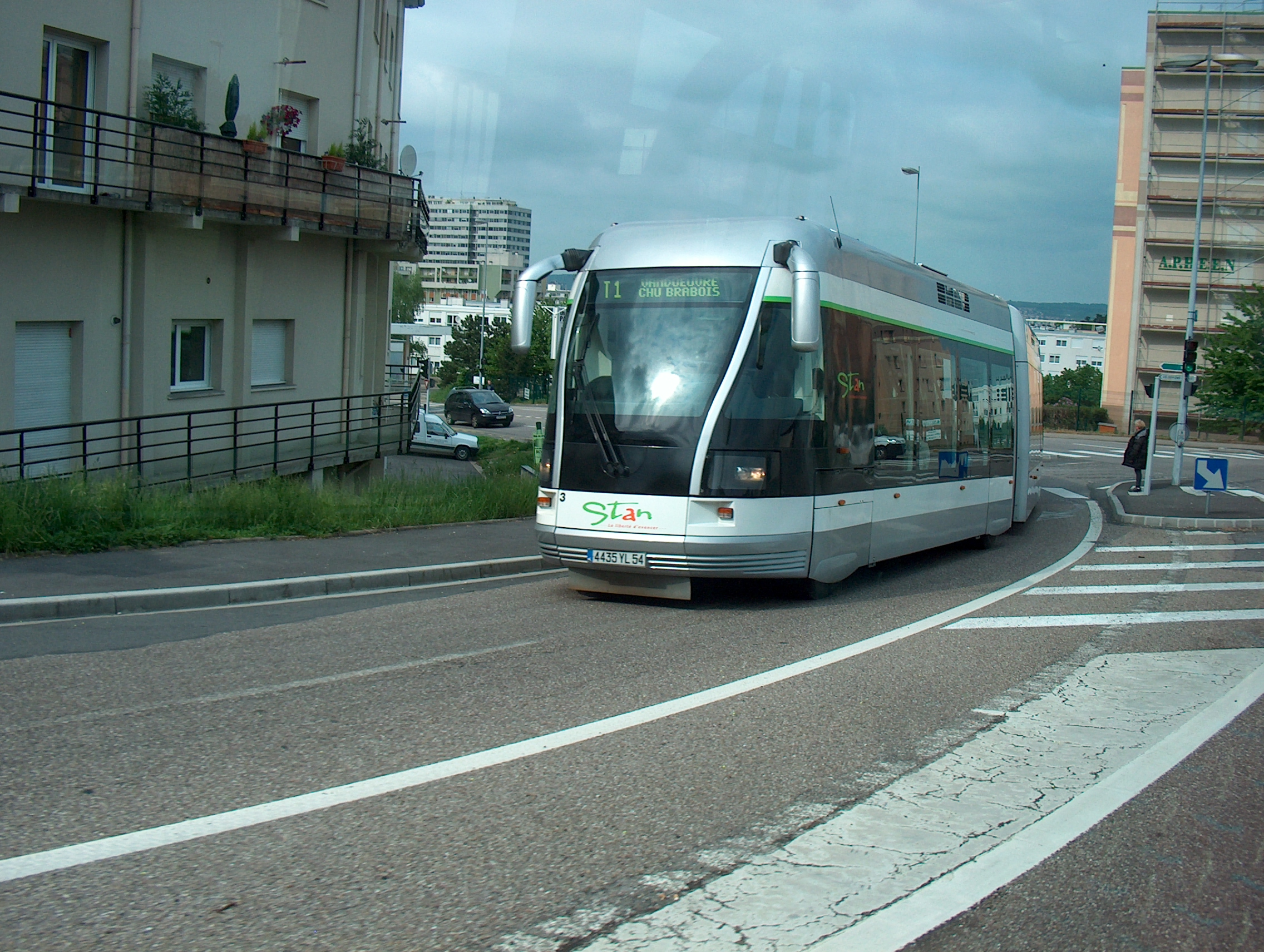
TVR running without rail

== History ==
The system was implemented as a replacement for the trolleybus network. Operation of the 10-kilometre-long (6.2 mi) line began in 2000. The system had problems with derailing vehicles, as well as heavy wear and tear of the pavement. In 2018, 12 vehicles from Caen were transferred to Nancy for use as spare parts donors.

=== Closure and replacement ===
The TVR system was planned to be replaced by a conventional low-floor tram system; however, due to high costs and steep gradients the TVR was replaced by conventional bi-articulated trolleybuses entering service on 5 April 2025.

== See also ==
- Caen Guided Light Transit
- List of rubber-tyred tram systems
- List of town tramway systems in France
- Trams in France
