= Franck Leroy =

French politician (born 1963)

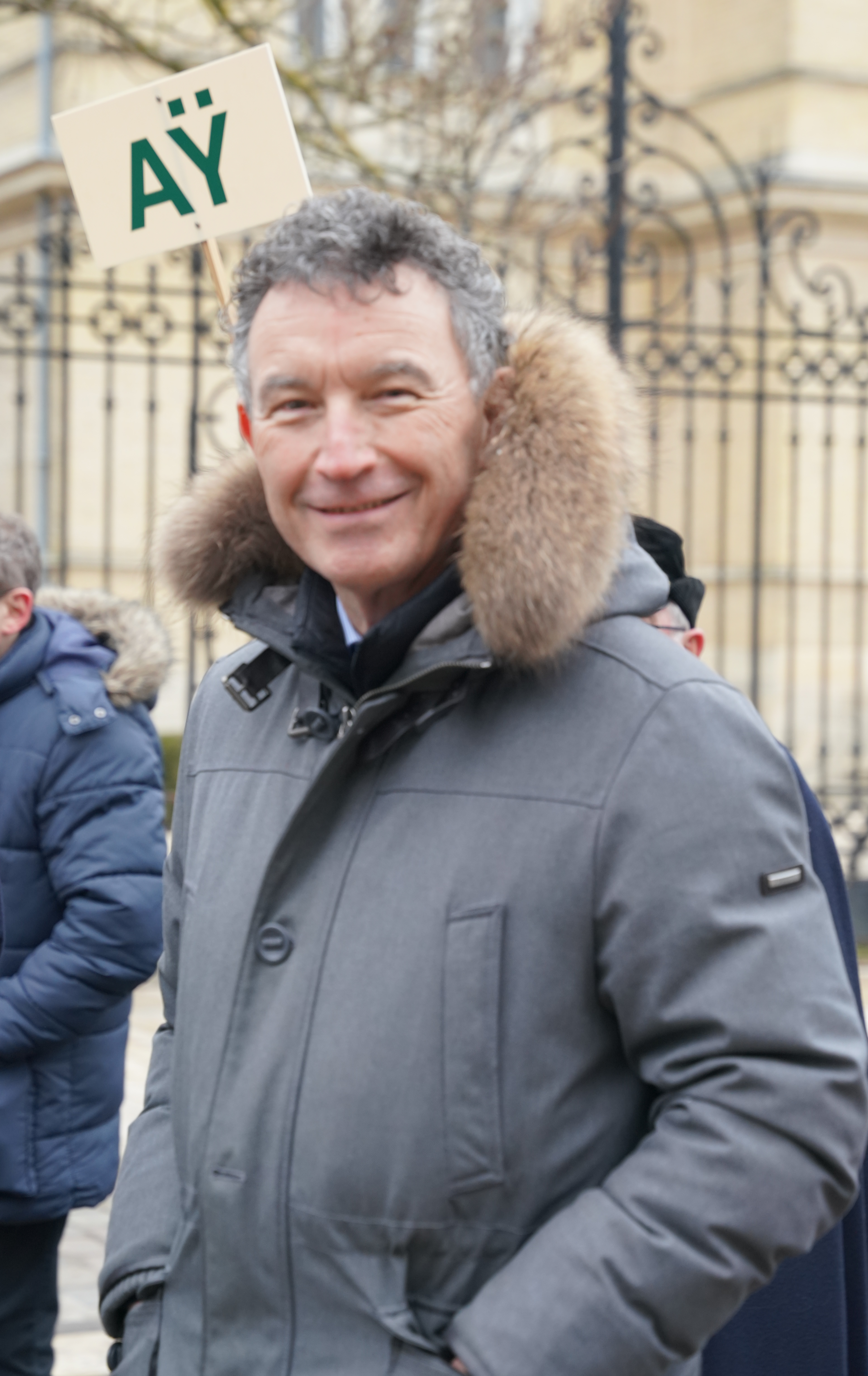
- Leroy in 2024

President of the Regional Council of Grand Est
- Incumbent
- Assumed office 30 December 2022
- Preceded by: Jean Rottner

Personal details
- Born: 12 January 1963 (age 63)
- Party: Independent (since 2023)

Franck Leroy (born 12 January 1963) is a French politician serving as president of the Regional Council of Grand Est since 2022. He has served as president of the Agence de financement des infrastructures de transport de France since 2024.
