= Lac de Bouzey =

Lake in Vosges, Grand Est, France

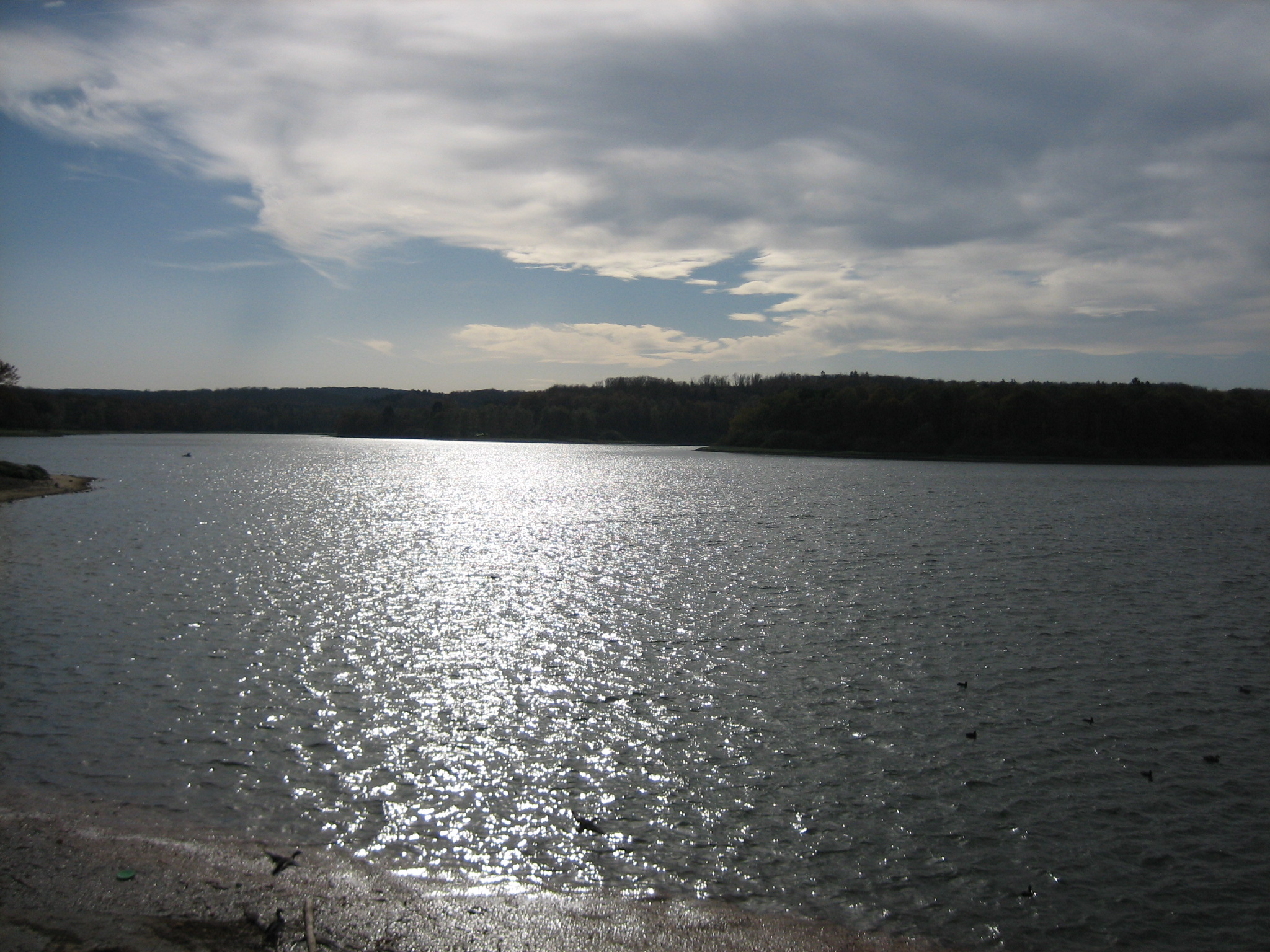

- Location within France
- Location: Vosges
- Coordinates: 48.164537°N 6.356179°E
- Type: artificial
- Primary inflows: Moselle
- Primary outflows: canal de l'Est, Avière
- Basin countries: France
- Surface area: 1.27 km^{2} (0.49 sq mi)
- Max. depth: 12 m (39 ft)
- Water volume: 7 hm^{3} (5,700 acre⋅ft)
- Surface elevation: 360 m (1,180 ft)

Lac de Bouzey is an artificial lake in Vosges, France. At an elevation of 360 m, its surface area is 1.27 km^{2}.
