= Twisto =

Public transport operator in Caen, France

Compagnie des Transports de l'Agglomération Caenaise

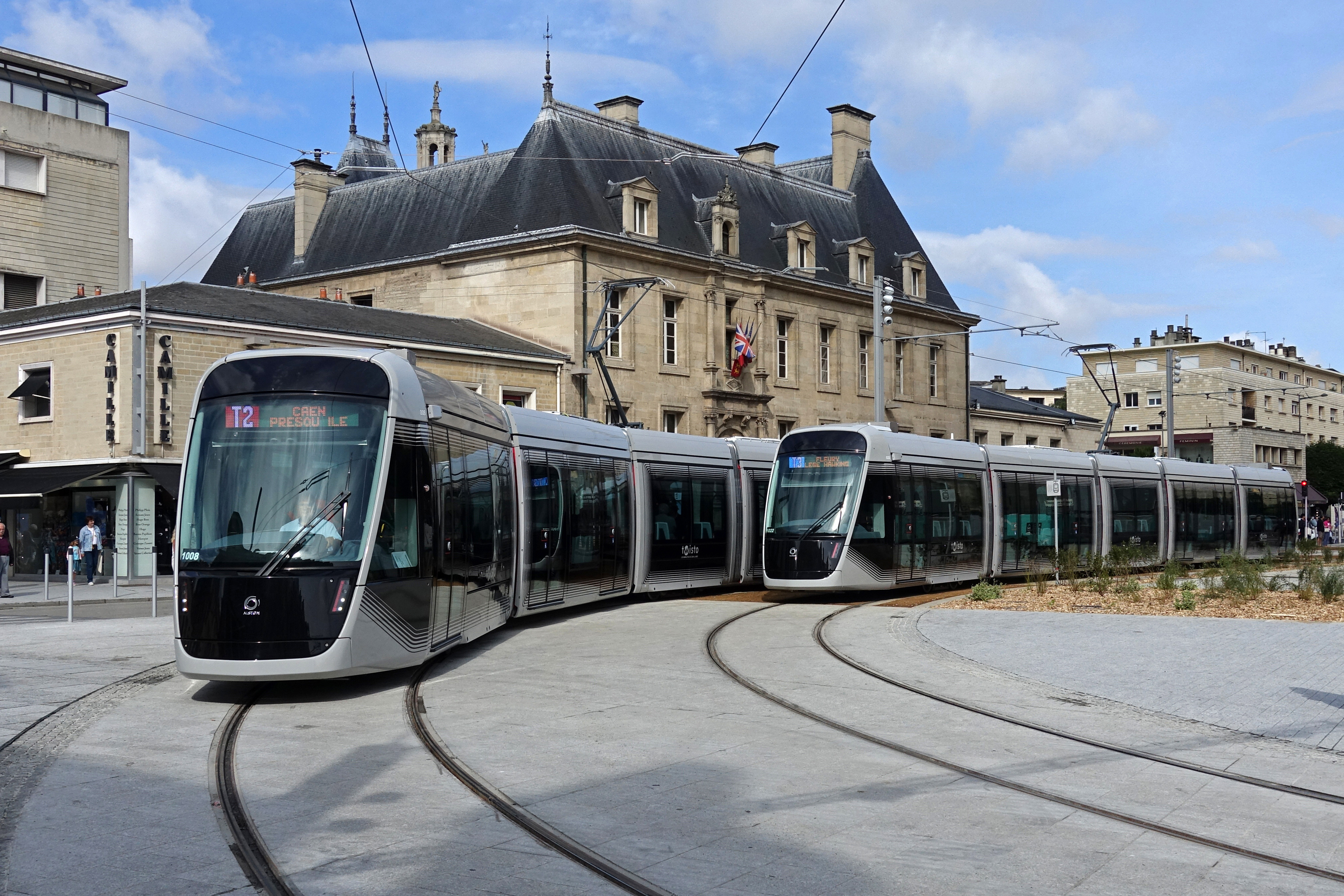
- Caen tramway
- Founded: 1977; 49 years ago
- Headquarters: Caen, France
- Locale: Agglomeration of Caen
- Service type: Urban bus service
- Routes: 3 tram lines, 25 bus lines
- Stops: 1,050 stops
- Fleet: 26 trams, 153 buses, 50 articulated buses
- Annual ridership: 25 million
- Operator: Keolis
- Website: www.twisto.fr

Twisto is the brand name under which buses and trams are operated in the Norman city of Caen, France.

The CTAC (Compagnie des Transports de l'Agglomération Caenaise) owns the buses and has been operating services under the Twisto brand since 2002. Its bus depots are in Mondeville and the Industrial estate of Hérouville-Saint-Clair. Twisto formerly operated the Caen Guided Light Transit from 2002 to 2017, before it was replaced by trams. It is operated under contract by Keolis. In January 2025, RATP Dev will takeover under a six year contract.

As of 27 July 2019, the Twisto network comprised:

- three tramway lines;
- 22 regular bus routes, two shuttle services (one electric bus serving the city center of Caen and one providing a link to the Ouistreham ferry terminal), and three Flexo Pro routes serving industrial areas;
- five demand-responsive transport zones (Résago);
- seven evening demand-responsive service zones (Flexo);
- one night service operating from Thursday to Sunday (Noctibus);
- 15 regional coach routes with integrated fares;
- 37 school routes (complementary network) serving educational institutions in Caen.
