= List of town tramway systems in France =

This is a list of town tramway systems in France by région. It includes all tram systems, past and present. Cities with currently operating systems, and those systems themselves, are indicated in bold and blue background colored rows. Those tram systems that operated on other than standard gauge track (where known) are indicated in the 'Notes' column.

== Auvergne-Rhône-Alpes ==
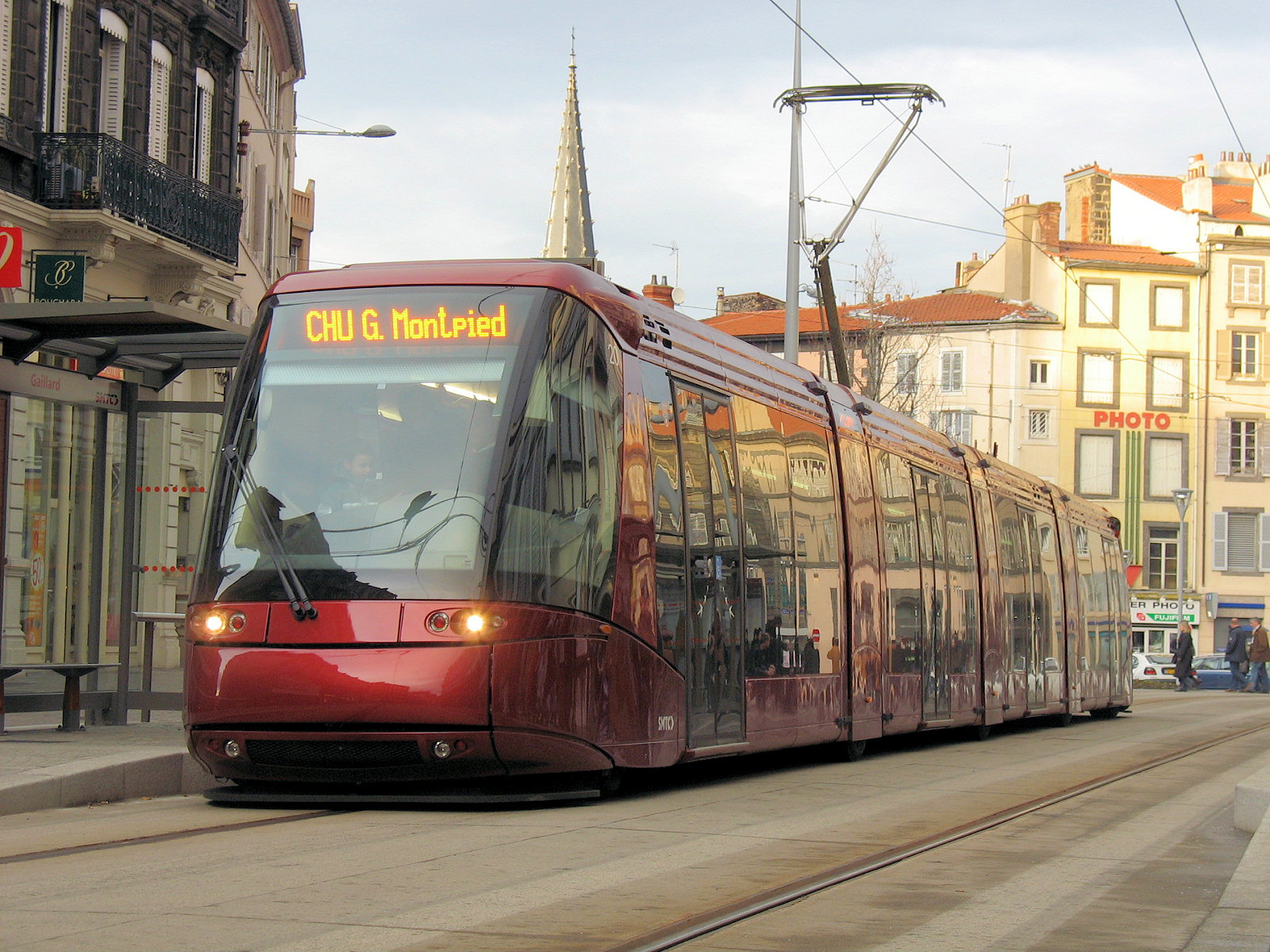
Clermont-Ferrand Translohr tramway

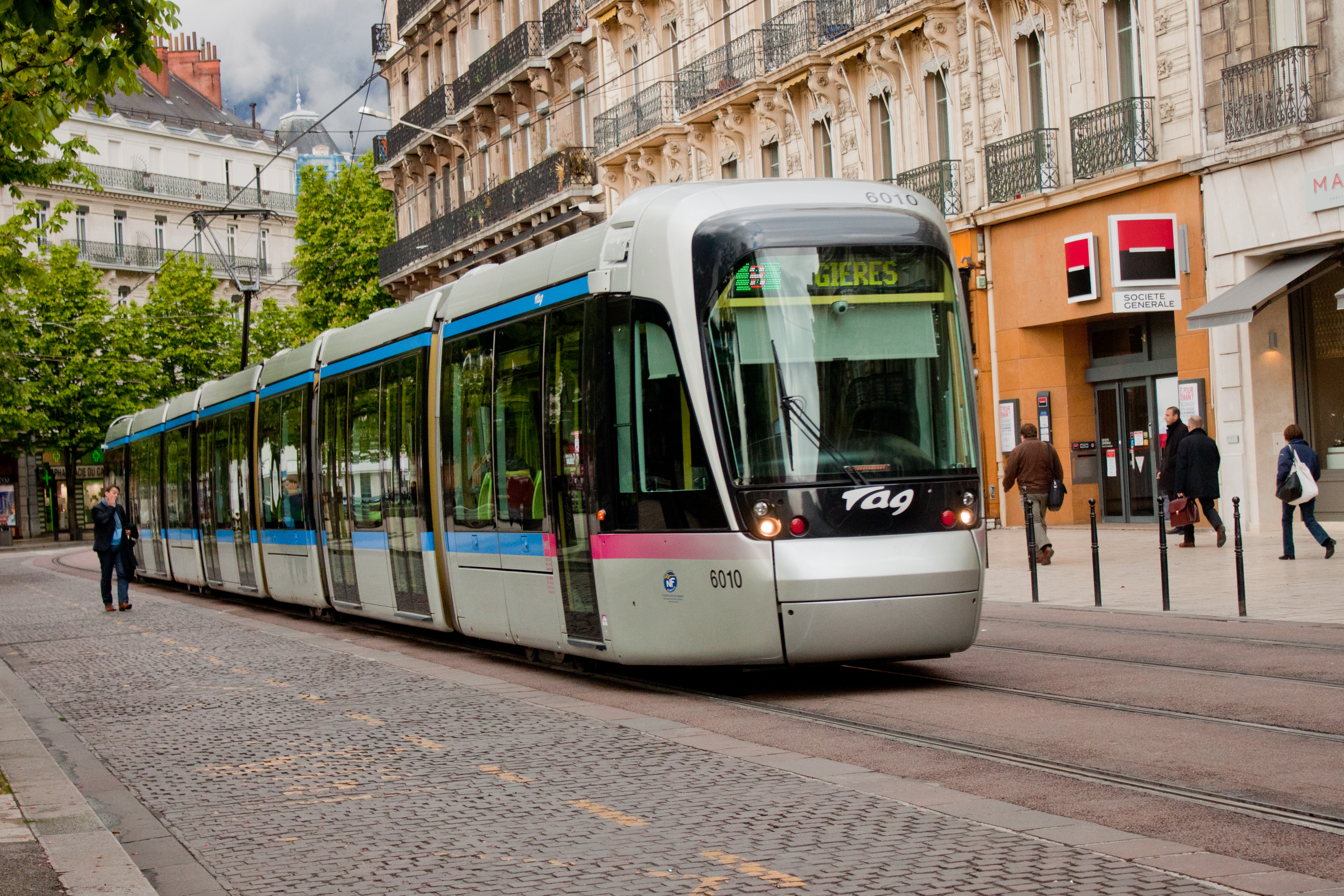
Grenoble

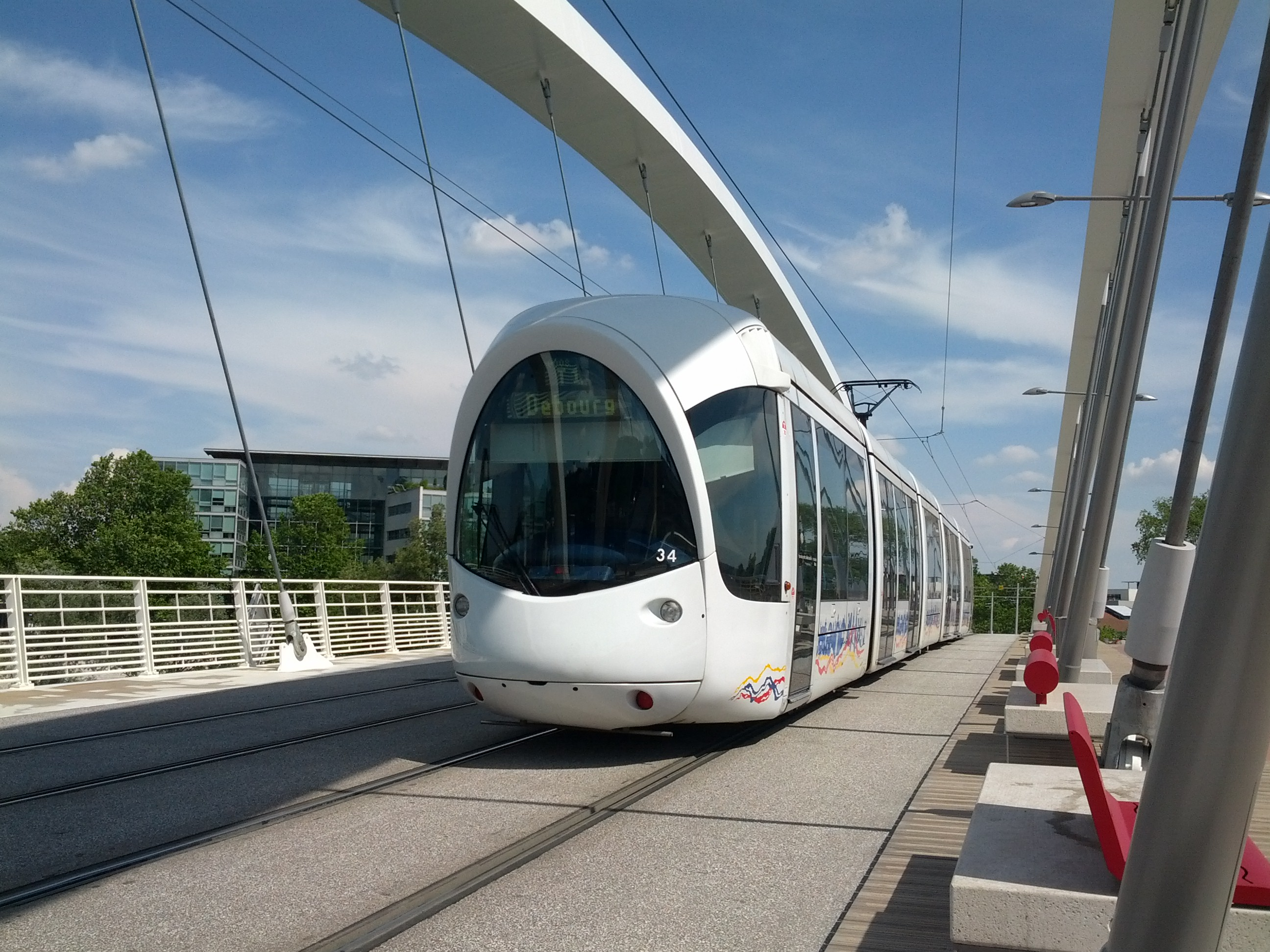
Lyon

Name of System	Location	Traction Type	Date (From)	Date (To)	Notes
	Aix-les-Bains	Compressed air	18 Apr 1897	1908	Gauge: 1,000 mm (3 ft 3 3/8 in)
	Annemasse	Steam	22 Oct 1883	1902	Gauge: 1,000 mm (3 ft 3 3/8 in)
	Annemasse	Electric	2 Jan 1902	31 Dec 1958	Gauge: 1,000 mm (3 ft 3 3/8 in)
	Clermont-Ferrand	Electric	7 Jan 1890	17 Mar 1956	Gauge: 1,000 mm (3 ft 3 3/8 in); Clermont-Ferrand's modern transport system, the **Clermont-Ferrand tramway** (opened: 2006), is a Translohr system rather than a traditional rail-based tram system.
	Évian-les-Bains	Electric	1898	1908	
	**Grenoble**	Electric	17 Apr 1897	31 Aug 1952	Gauge: 1,000 mm (3 ft 3 3/8 in)
Grenoble tramway	**Grenoble**	Electric	5 Sep 1987		
	La Bourboule	Electric	1904	1914	
	Le Puy-en-Velay	electric	12 Nov 1896	4 Aug 1914	Gauge: 1,000 mm (3 ft 3 3/8 in)
	**Lyon**	Horse	21 Jun 1897	?	
	**Lyon**	Steam	1888	?	Gauge: 1,000 mm (3 ft 3 3/8 in)
	**Lyon**	Electric	26 Aug 1894	30 Jan 1956	
Lyon tramway	**Lyon**	Electric	23 Dec 2000		
	Moûtiers	Electric	1899	1929	Gauge: 1,000 mm (3 ft 3 3/8 in)
	Roanne	Electric	1901	1935	
	Saint-Chamond	Electric	1906	1931	Gauge: 1,000 mm (3 ft 3 3/8 in)
Saint-Étienne tramway	Saint-Étienne	Steam	4 Dec 1881	1912	Gauge: 1,000 mm (3 ft 3 3/8 in)
Saint-Étienne tramway	Saint-Étienne	Electric	17 Apr 1897		Gauge: 1,000 mm (3 ft 3 3/8 in)
	Valence	Electric	1927	1950	Gauge: 1,000 mm (3 ft 3 3/8 in)
	Vichy	Compressed air	15 Dec 1895	31 Mar 1927	

== Bourgogne-Franche-Comté ==
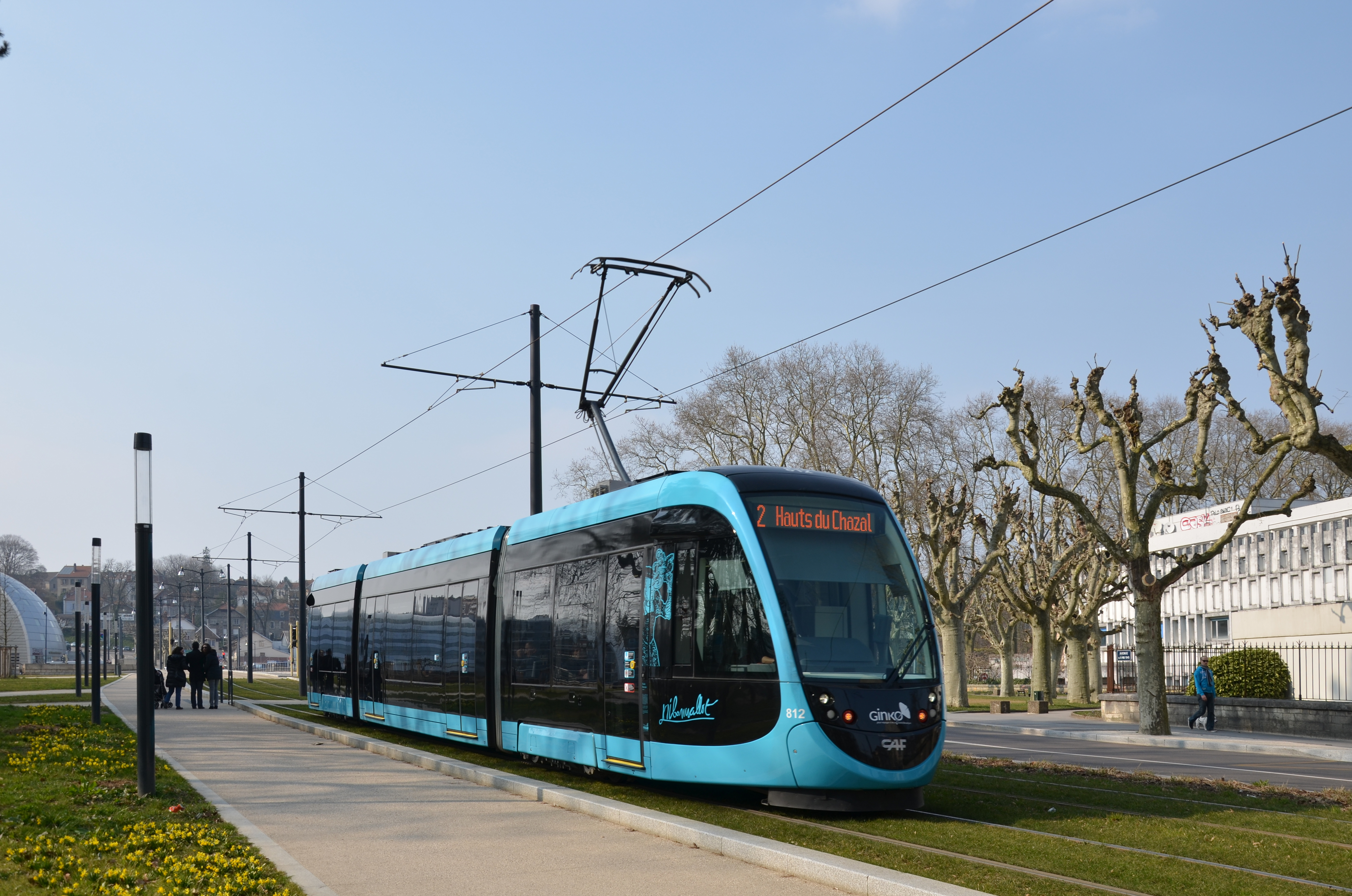
Besançon

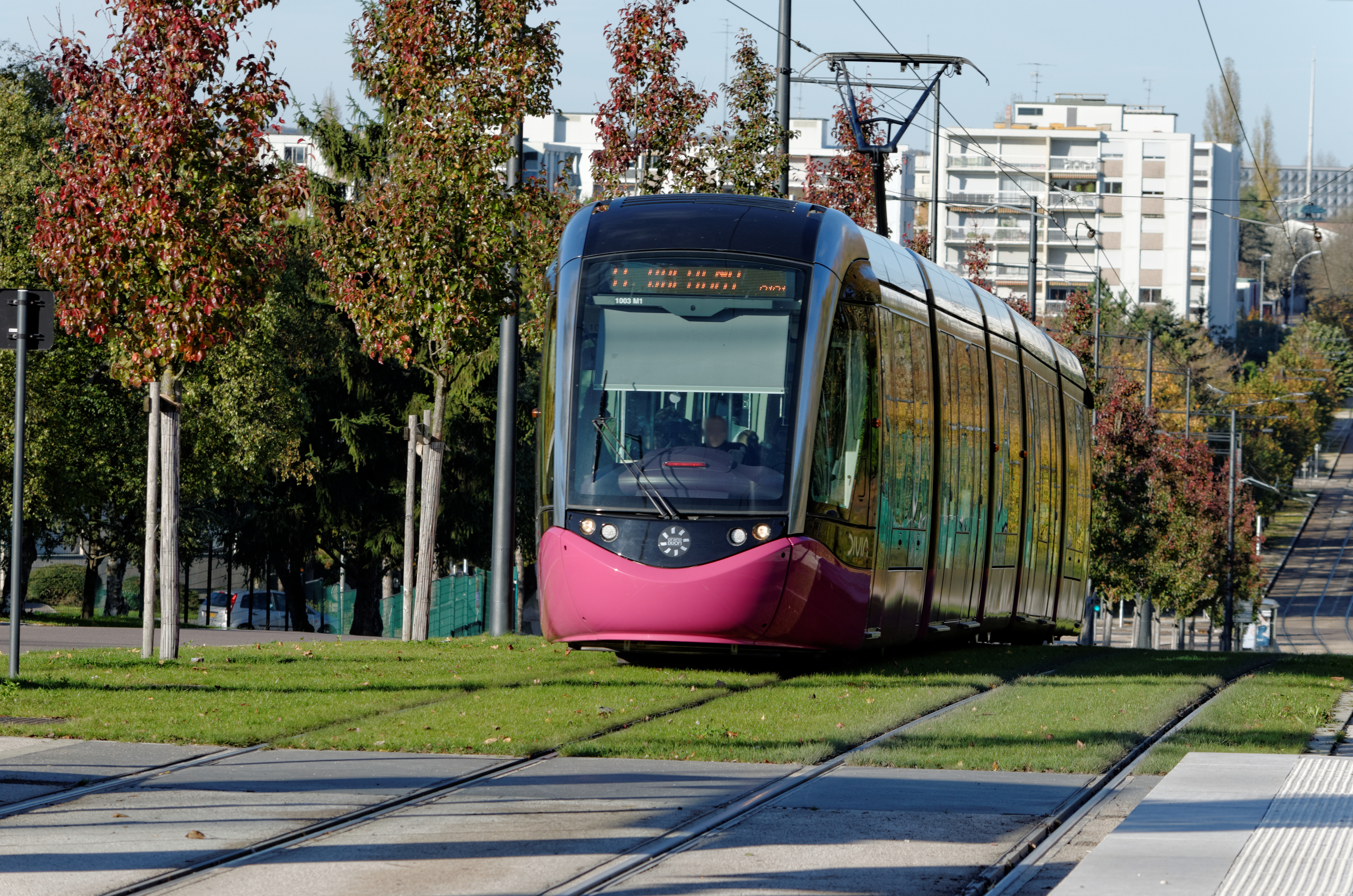
Dijon

Name of System	Location	Traction Type	Date (From)	Date (To)	Notes
	Beaucourt	Electric	1904	1935	Gauge: 1,000 mm (3 ft 3 3/8 in)
	Belfort	Electric	29 May 1898	1952	Gauge: 1,000 mm (3 ft 3 3/8 in)
	**Besançon**	Electric	21 Mar 1897	24 Dec 1952	
Besançon tramway	**Besançon**	Electric	30 Aug 2014		
	**Dijon**	Electric	1 Jan 1895	1 Dec 1961	Gauge: 1,000 mm (3 ft 3 3/8 in)
Dijon tramway	**Dijon**	Electric	2012		

== Brittany (Bretagne) ==
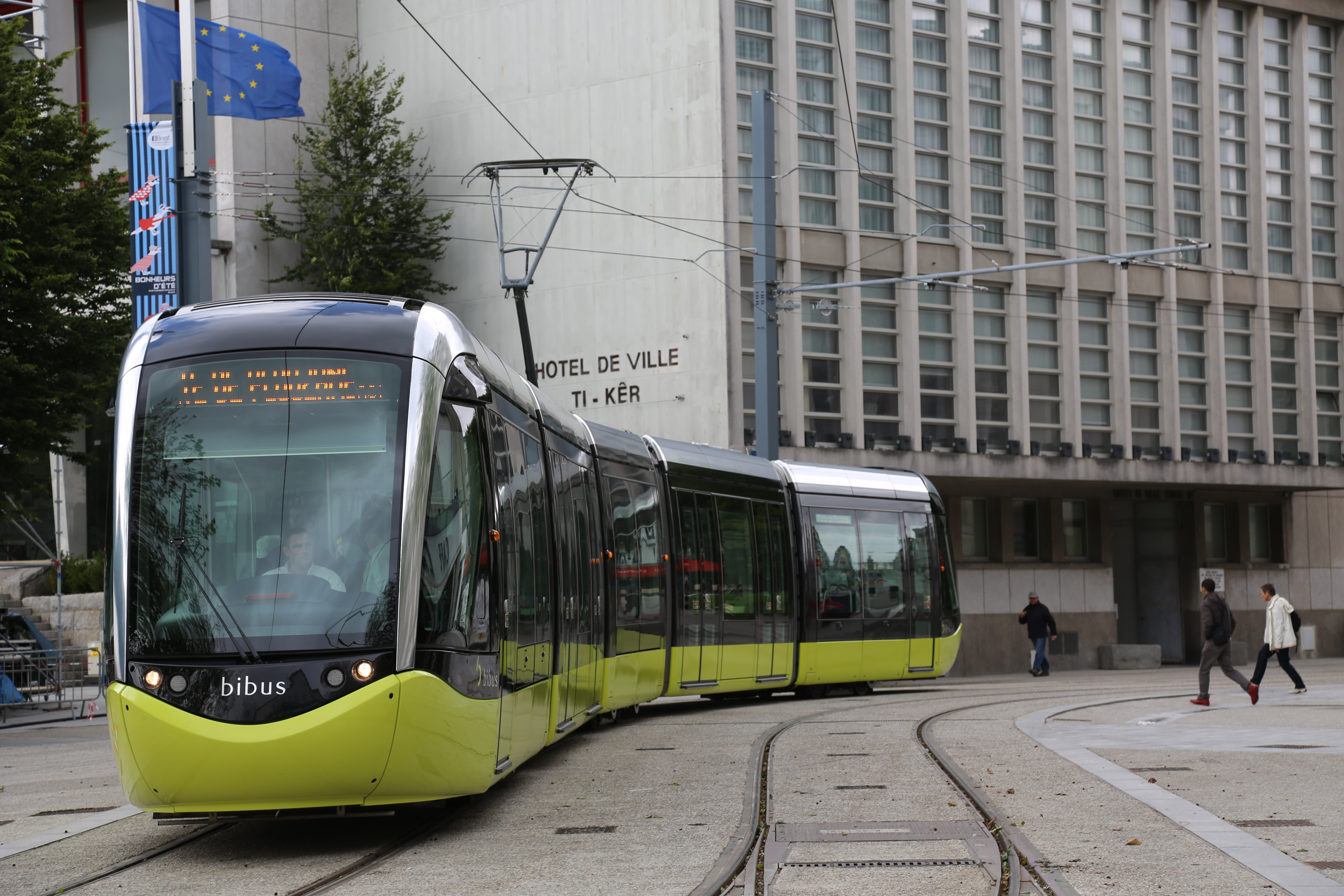
Brest

Name of System	Location	Traction Type	Date (From)	Date (To)	Notes
	Brest	Electric	1898	1945	Gauge: 1,000 mm (3 ft 3 3/8 in)
Brest tramway	Brest	Electric	23 Jun 2012		
	Lorient	Electric	1901	1944	Gauge: 1,000 mm (3 ft 3 3/8 in)
	Saint-Malo	Electric	1927	1948	Gauge: 1,000 mm (3 ft 3 3/8 in)

== Centre-Val de Loire ==
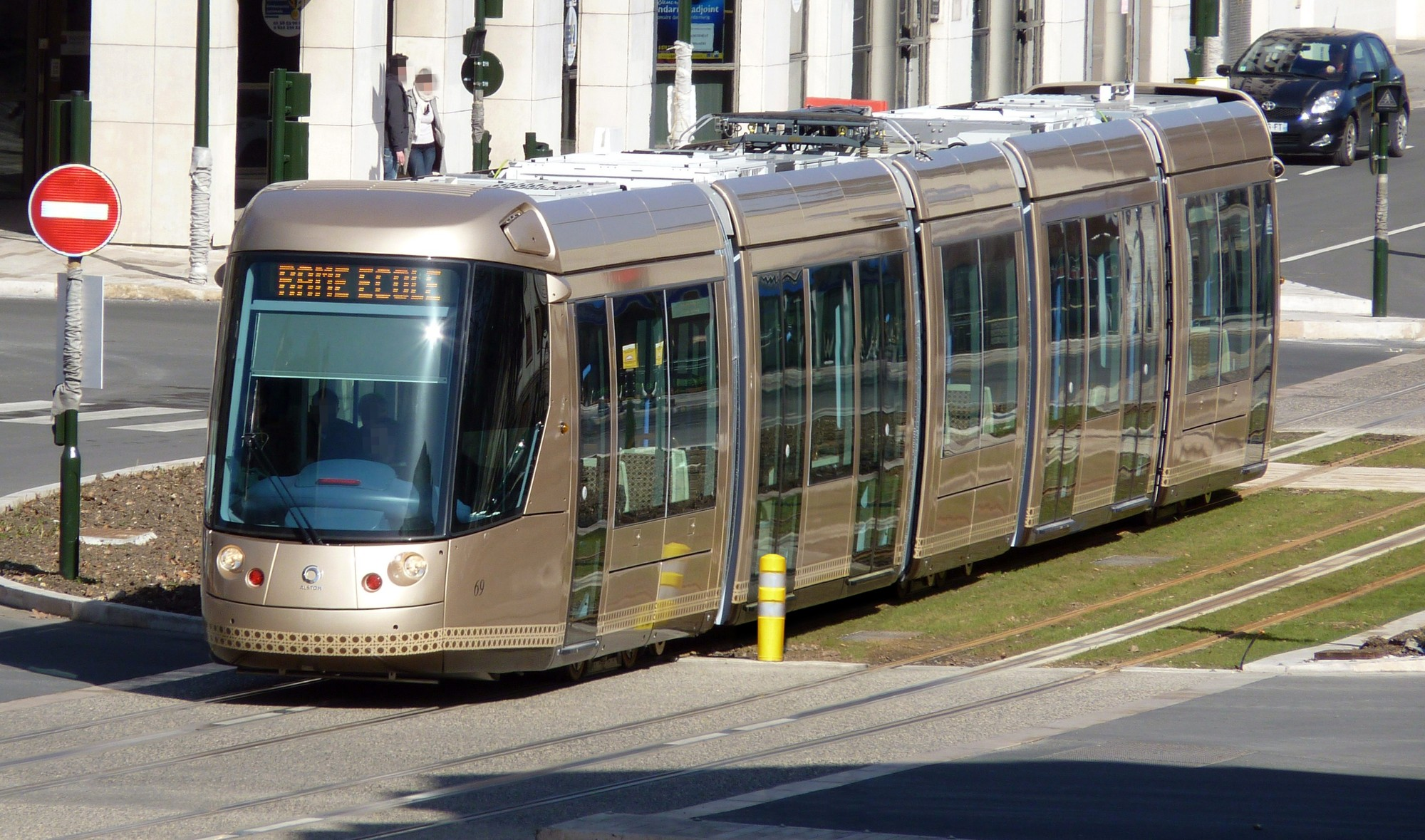
Orléans

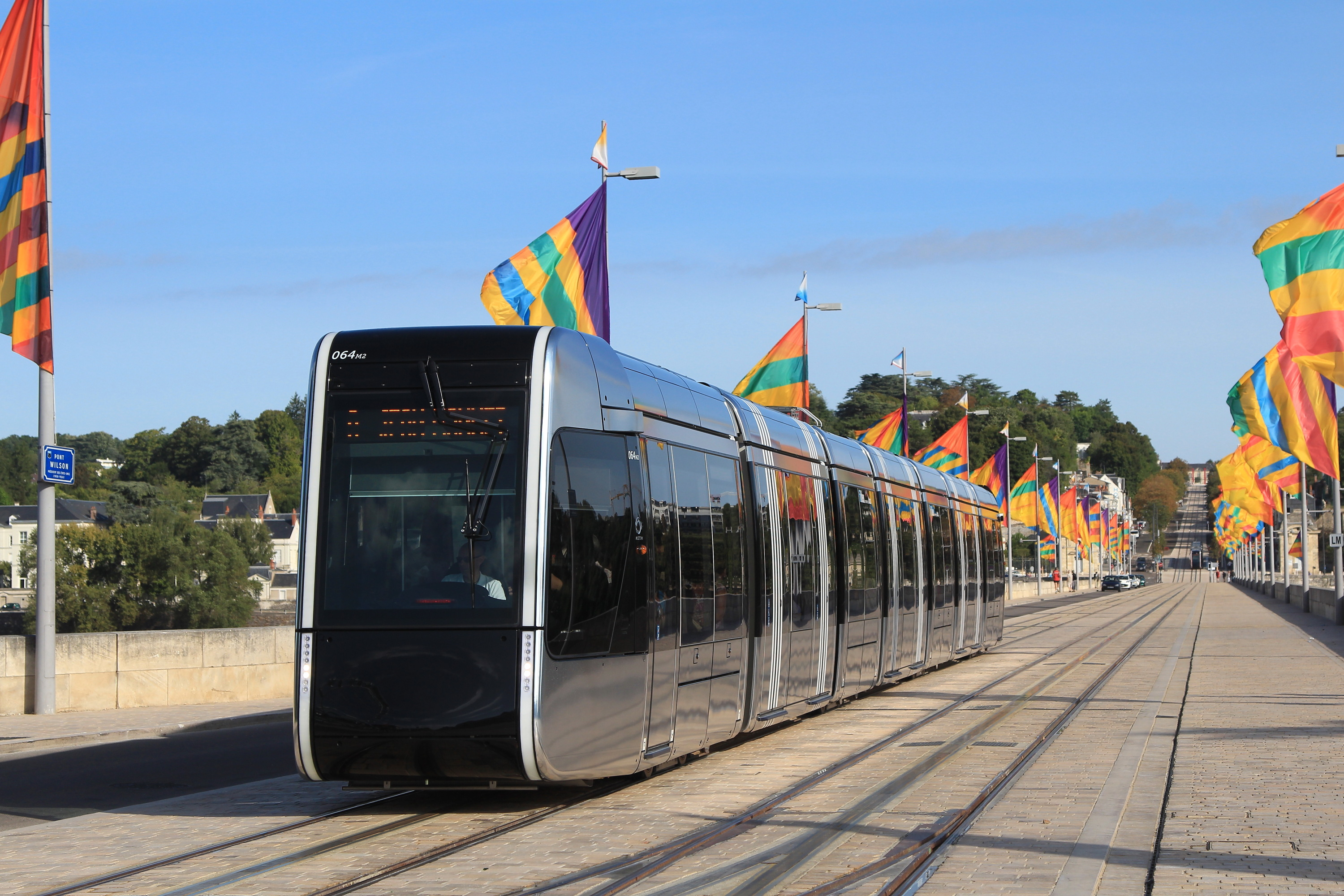
Tours

Name of System	Location	Traction Type	Date (From)	Date (To)	Notes
	Blois	Electric	1910	1934	Gauge: 1,000 mm (3 ft 3 3/8 in)
	Bourges	Electric	1898	1949	Gauge: 1,000 mm (3 ft 3 3/8 in)
	**Orléans**	Horse	6 May 1877	?	
	**Orléans**	Electric	28 Jun 1899	31 Mar 1938	
Orléans tramway	**Orléans**	Electric	20 Nov 2000		
	Tours	Electric	1900	1949	Gauge: 1,000 mm (3 ft 3 3/8 in)
Tours tramway	Tours	Electric	31 Aug 2013		

== Corsica (Corse) ==
Name of System	Location	Traction Type	Date (From)	Date (To)	Notes
	Ajaccio	Horse	?	?	

== Grand Est ==
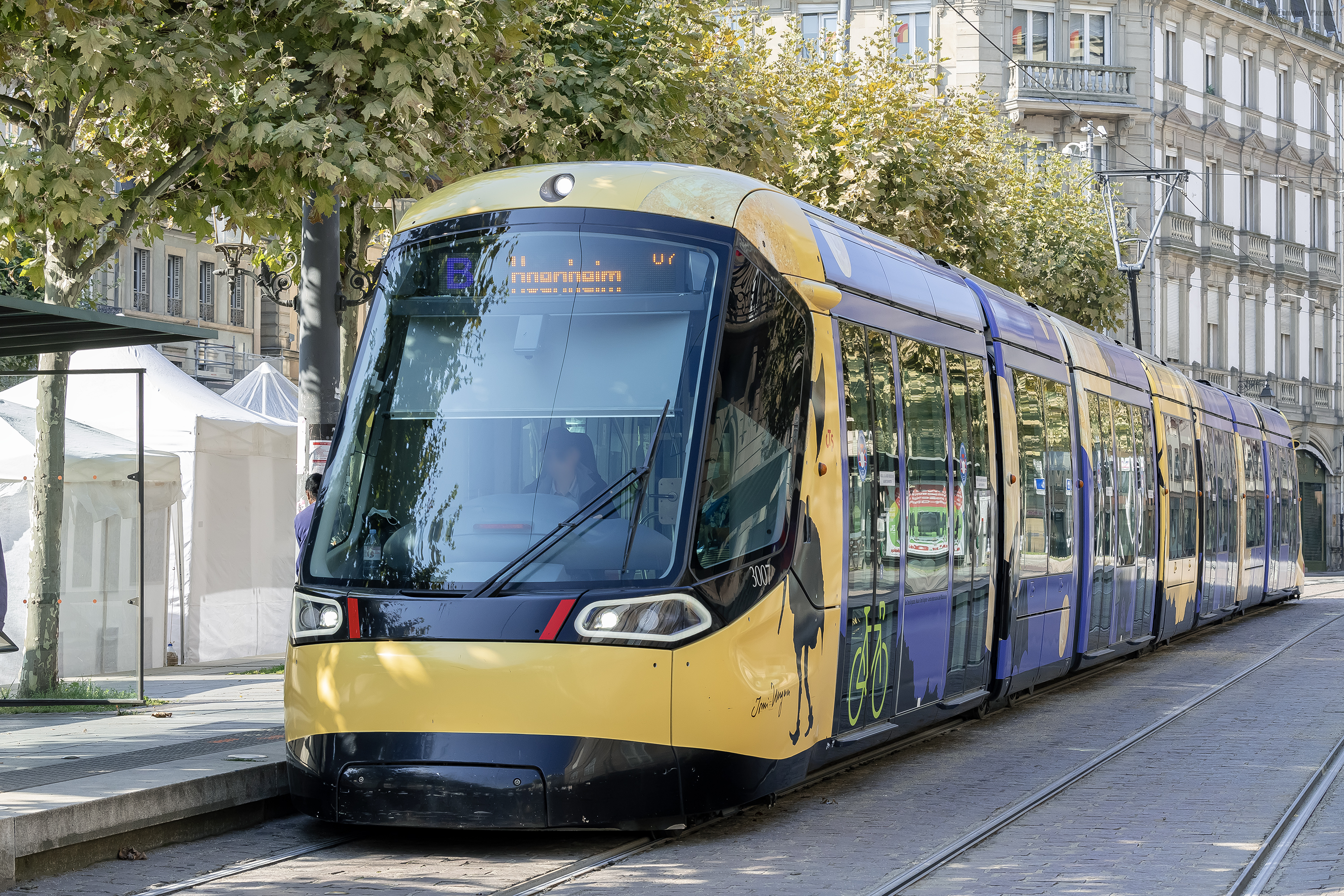
Strasbourg

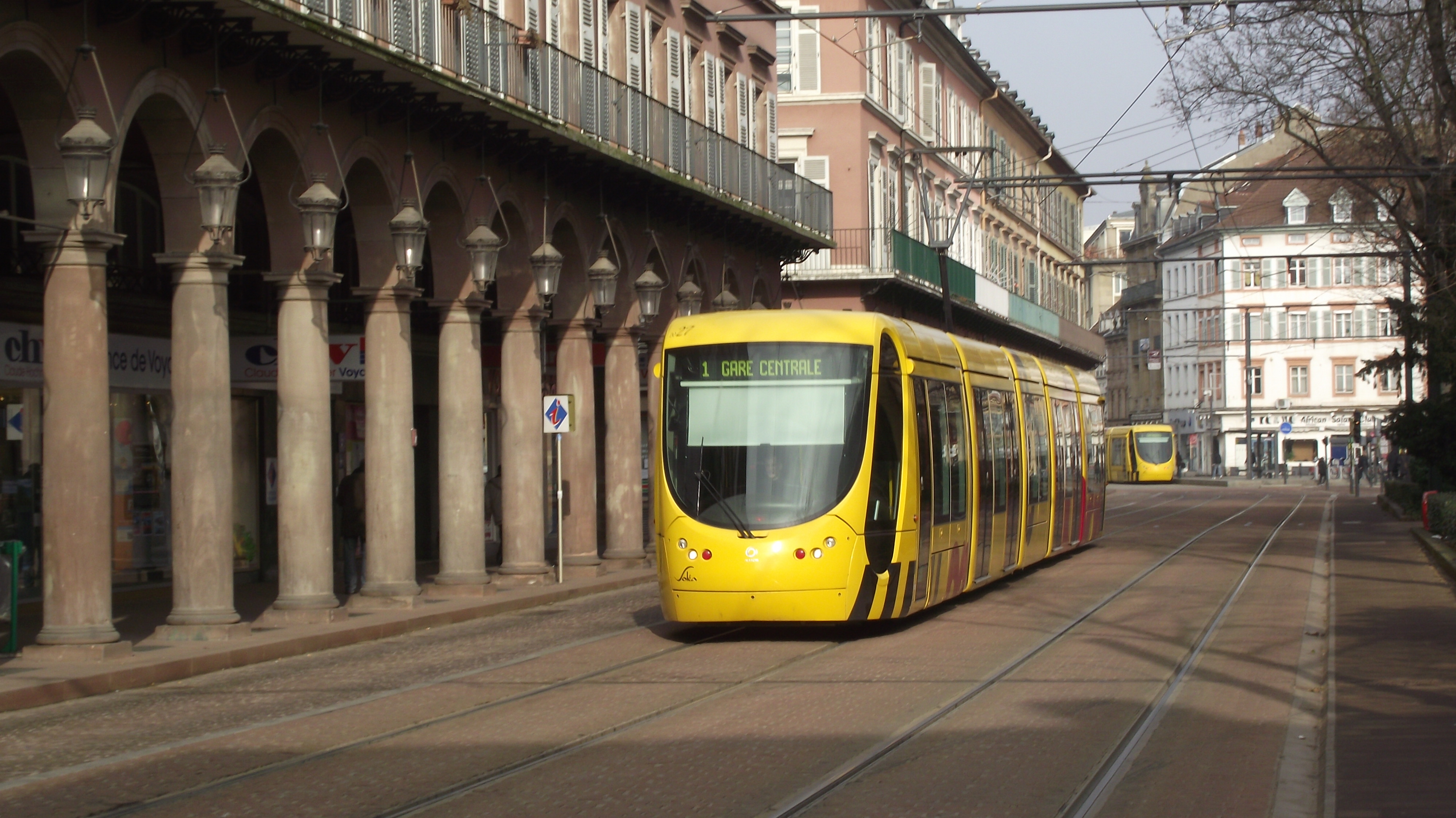
Mulhouse

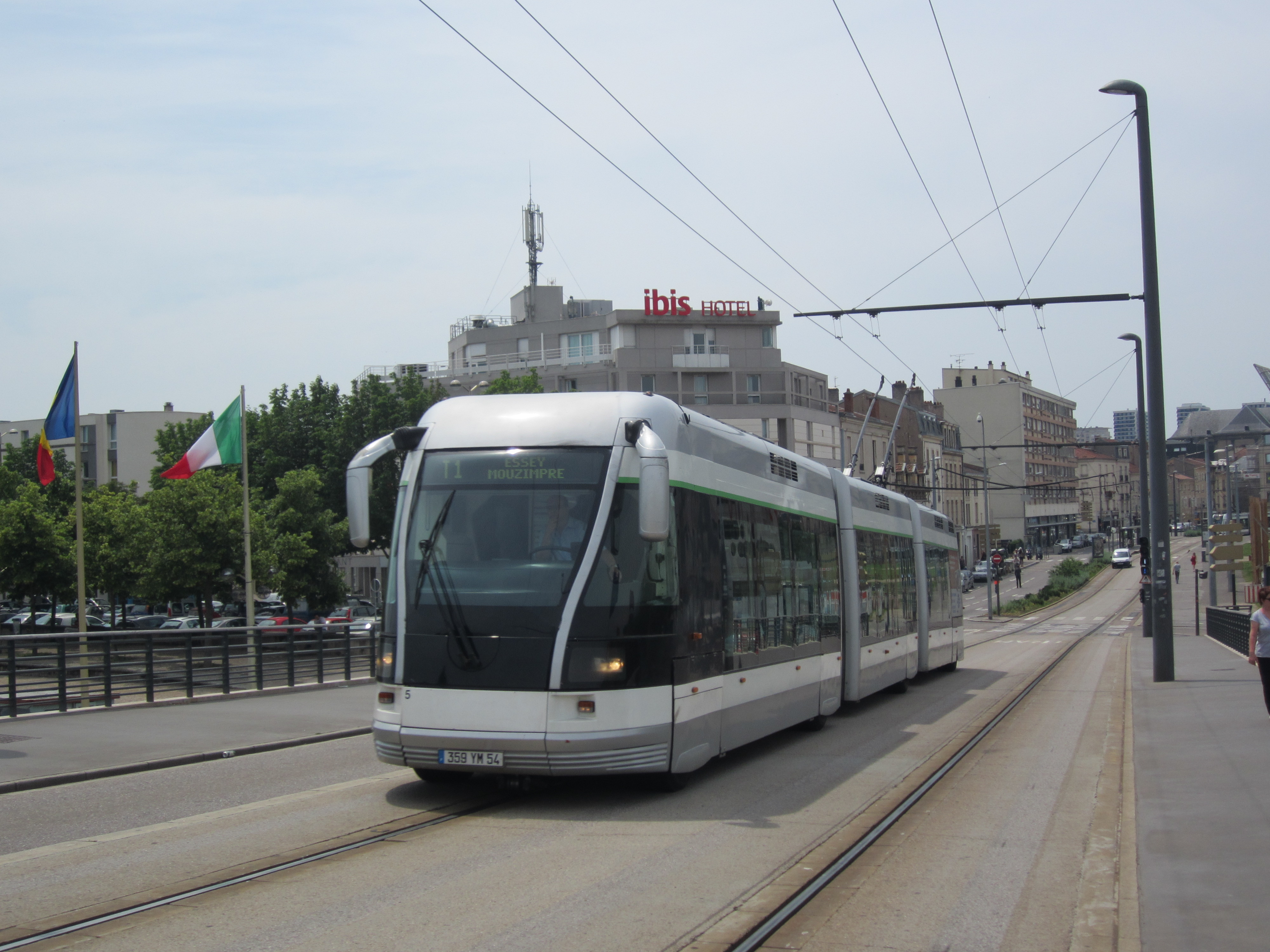
Nancy Guided Light Transit

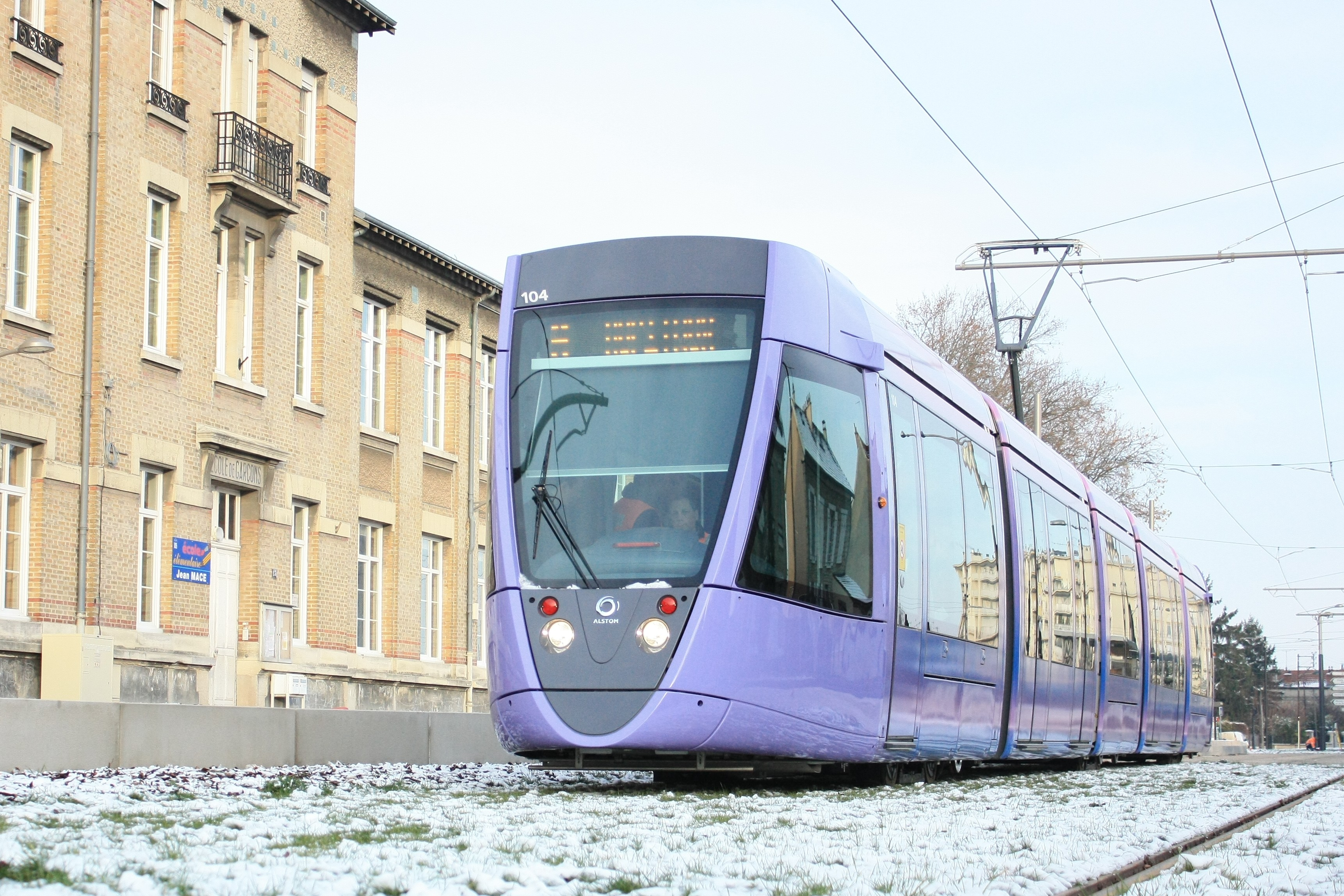
Reims

Name of System	Location	Traction Type	Date (From)	Date (To)	Notes
	Châlons-en-Champagne	Electric	1897	1938	Gauge: 1,000 mm (3 ft 3 3/8 in)
	Charleville-Mézières	Electric	1900	1914	Gauge: 1,000 mm (3 ft 3 3/8 in)
	Colmar	Electric	16 Mar 1902	31 Jan 1960	Gauge: 1,000 mm (3 ft 3 3/8 in)
	Épinal	Electric	1906	1914	Gauge: 1,000 mm (3 ft 3 3/8 in)
	Forbach	Electric	1912	1950	Gauge: 1,000 mm (3 ft 3 3/8 in)
	Hagondange - Maizières-lès-Metz	Electric	1913	1964	
	Longwy	Electric	1902	1935	Gauge: 1,000 mm (3 ft 3 3/8 in)
	Metz	Electric	1902	1948	
	**Mulhouse**	Steam	1 Oct 1892	1894	Gauge: 1,000 mm (3 ft 3 3/8 in)
	**Mulhouse**	Electric	1894	2 May 1956	
Mulhouse tramway	**Mulhouse**	Electric	13 May 2006		
	Nancy	Horse	12 Aug 1874	c.1903	
	Nancy	Electric	1898	2 Dec 1958	
	Novéant-sur-Moselle	Electric	1911	1933	
C.T.R.	**Reims**	Horse	19 Jun 1881	Apr 1901	Gauge: 1,000 mm (3 ft 3 3/8 in)
C.T.R.	**Reims**	Electric	1 Jun 1900	15 Oct 1939	Gauge: 1,000 mm (3 ft 3 3/8 in)
Reims tramway	**Reims**	Electric	16 Apr 2011		
	Ribeauvillé	Horse	?	?	
	Ribeauvillé	Steam	?	1937	
	Saint-Avold	Electric	1910	1940	Gauge: 1,000 mm (3 ft 3 3/8 in)
	Sedan	Electric	1899	1914	Gauge: 1,000 mm (3 ft 3 3/8 in)
	**Strasbourg**	Horse	22 Jul 1878	1899	Gauge: 1,000 mm (3 ft 3 3/8 in)
	**Strasbourg**	Steam	1883	12 Aug 1926	Gauge: 1,000 mm (3 ft 3 3/8 in)
	**Strasbourg**	Electric	May 1895	30 Apr 1960	Gauge: 1,000 mm (3 ft 3 3/8 in)
Strasbourg tramway	**Strasbourg**	Electric	25 Nov 1994		
	Thionville	Electric	9 May 1912	22 Sep 1952	Gauge: 1,000 mm (3 ft 3 3/8 in)
	Troyes	Electric	1899	1950	Gauge: 1,000 mm (3 ft 3 3/8 in)
	Turckheim	Electric	3 Jun 1899	1 Apr 1937	Gauge: 1,000 mm (3 ft 3 3/8 in)

== Hauts-de-France ==
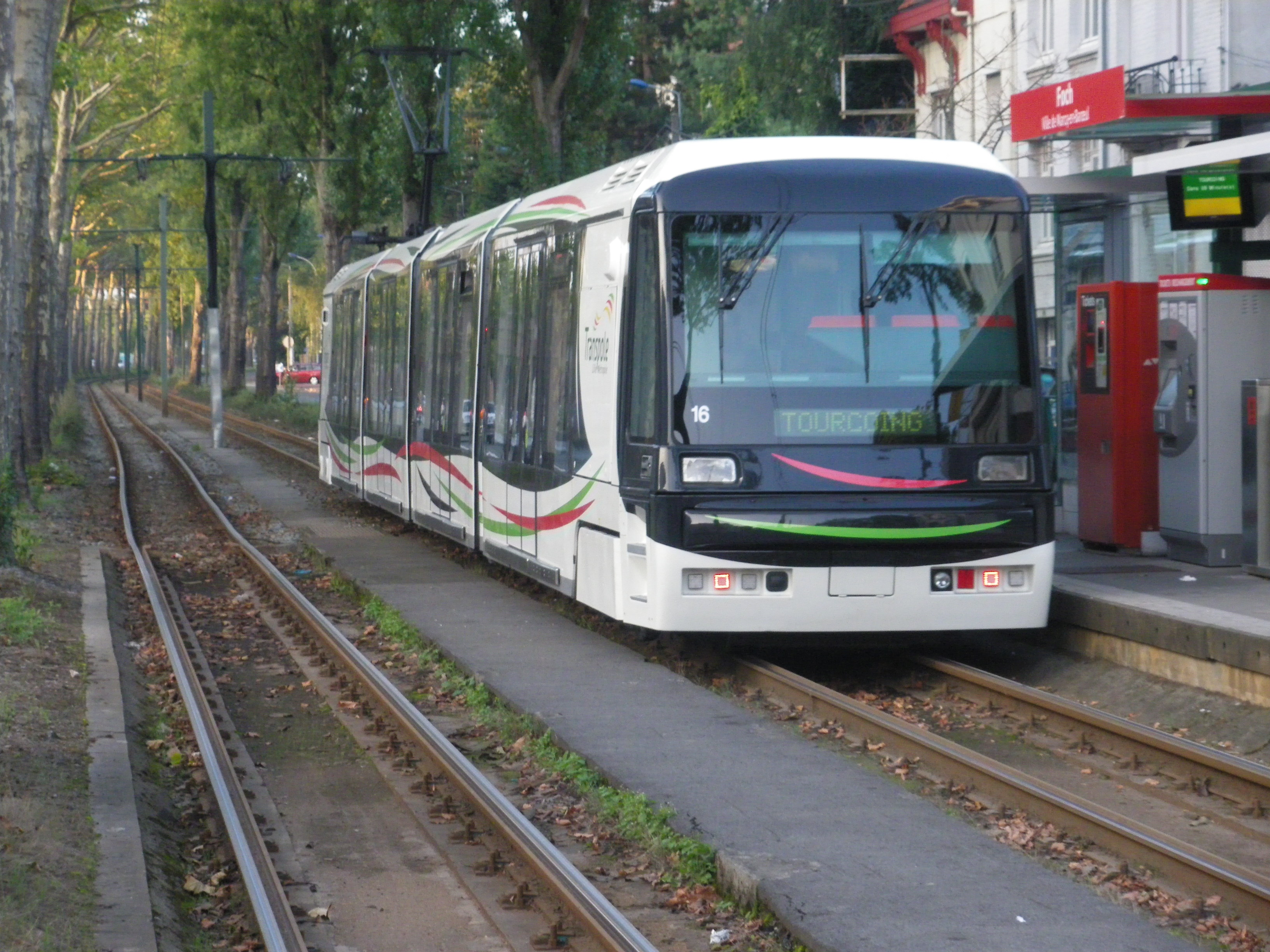
Lille

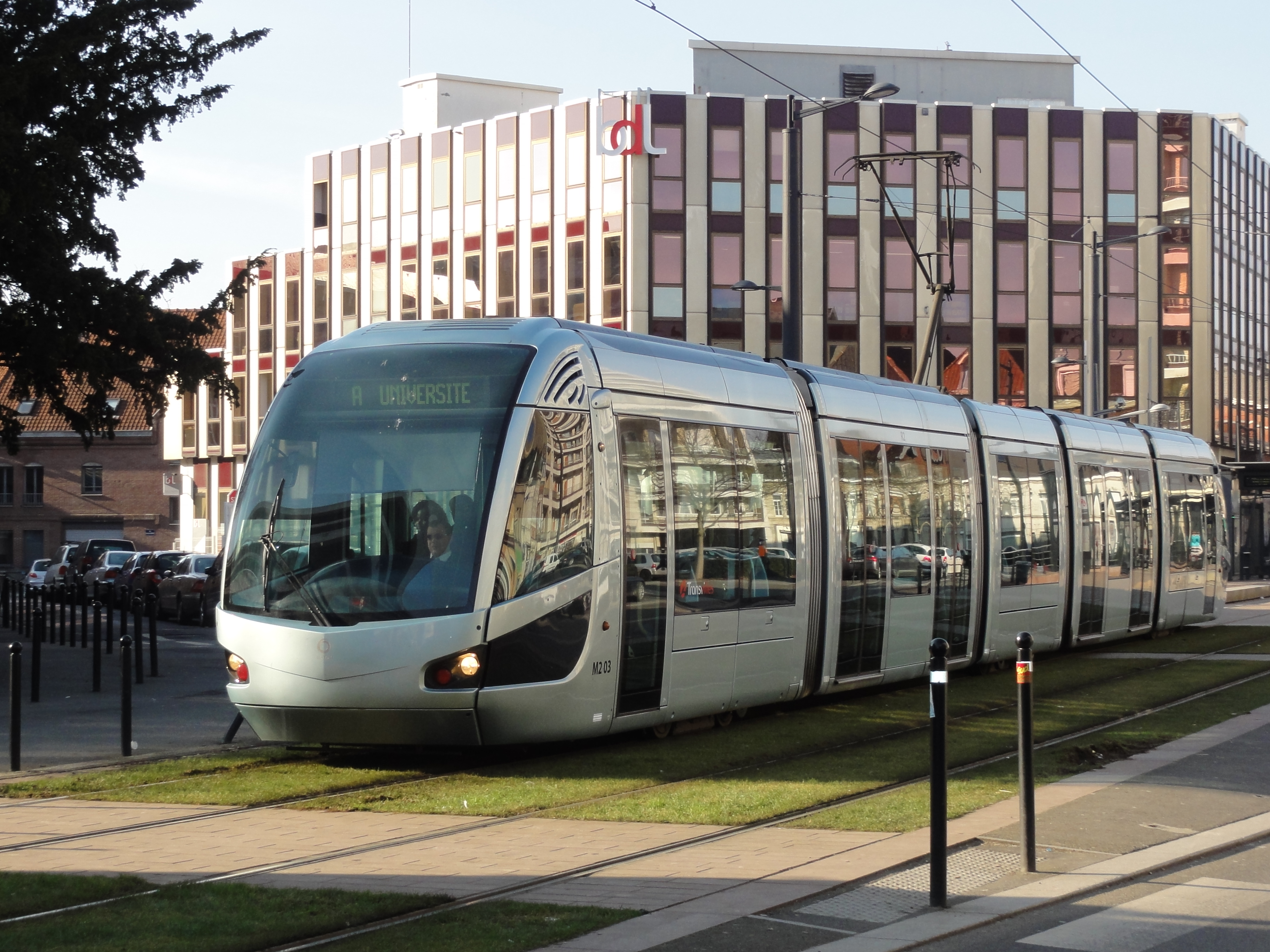
Valenciennes

Name of System	Location	Traction Type	Date (From)	Date (To)	Notes
	Amiens	Electric	1899	1940	Gauge: 1,000 mm (3 ft 3 3/8 in)
	Armentières	Electric	1901	1914	Gauge: 1,000 mm (3 ft 3 3/8 in)
	Boulogne-sur-Mer	Electric	1897	1951	
	Calais	Electric	1906	1940	
	Cambrai	Electric	1903	1914	Gauge: 1,000 mm (3 ft 3 3/8 in)
	Cassel	Electric	1900	1938	Gauge: 1,000 mm (3 ft 3 3/8 in)
	Douai	Electric	1898	1950	
	Dunkerque	Horse	1 June 1880	?	
	Dunkerque	Accumulator (storage battery)	1899	1903	
	Dunkerque	Electric	1903	3 Nov 1952	
	Étaples	Electric	1900	1935	Gauge: 1,000 mm (3 ft 3 3/8 in)
	Laon	Electric	9 jul 1899	27 jan 1971	Gauge: 1,000 mm (3 ft 3 3/8 in)
	**Lille**	Horse	7 June 1874	?	Gauge: 1,000 mm (3 ft 3 3/8 in)(?)
	**Lille**	Electric	1900	29 Jan 1966	Gauge: 1,000 mm (3 ft 3 3/8 in). Urban tramlines abandoned by 1966.
Lille tramway	**Lille**	Electric	4 Dec 1909		Gauge: 1,000 mm (3 ft 3 3/8 in). Interurban lines not abandoned, and in continuous operation since 1909.
	Maubeuge	Electric	16 Mar 1902	1951	Gauge: 1,000 mm (3 ft 3 3/8 in)
	Roubaix	Horse	19 Mar 1877	?	
	Roubaix	Electric	1894	15 July 1956	
	Saint-Quentin	Electric	6 Mar 1899	27 May 1956	Gauge: 1,000 mm (3 ft 3 3/8 in)
	Tergnier	Electric	1910	1939	Gauge: 1,000 mm (3 ft 3 3/8 in)
	Tourcoing	Horse	19 March 1877	?	
	Tourcoing	Electric	1894	15 July 1956	
	**Valenciennes**	Steam	1 Jan 1881	1914	Gauge: 1,000 mm (3 ft 3 3/8 in)
	**Valenciennes**	Electric	1914	2 July 1966	Gauge: 1,000 mm (3 ft 3 3/8 in)
Valenciennes tramway	**Valenciennes**	Electric	3 July 2006		

== Île-de-France ==
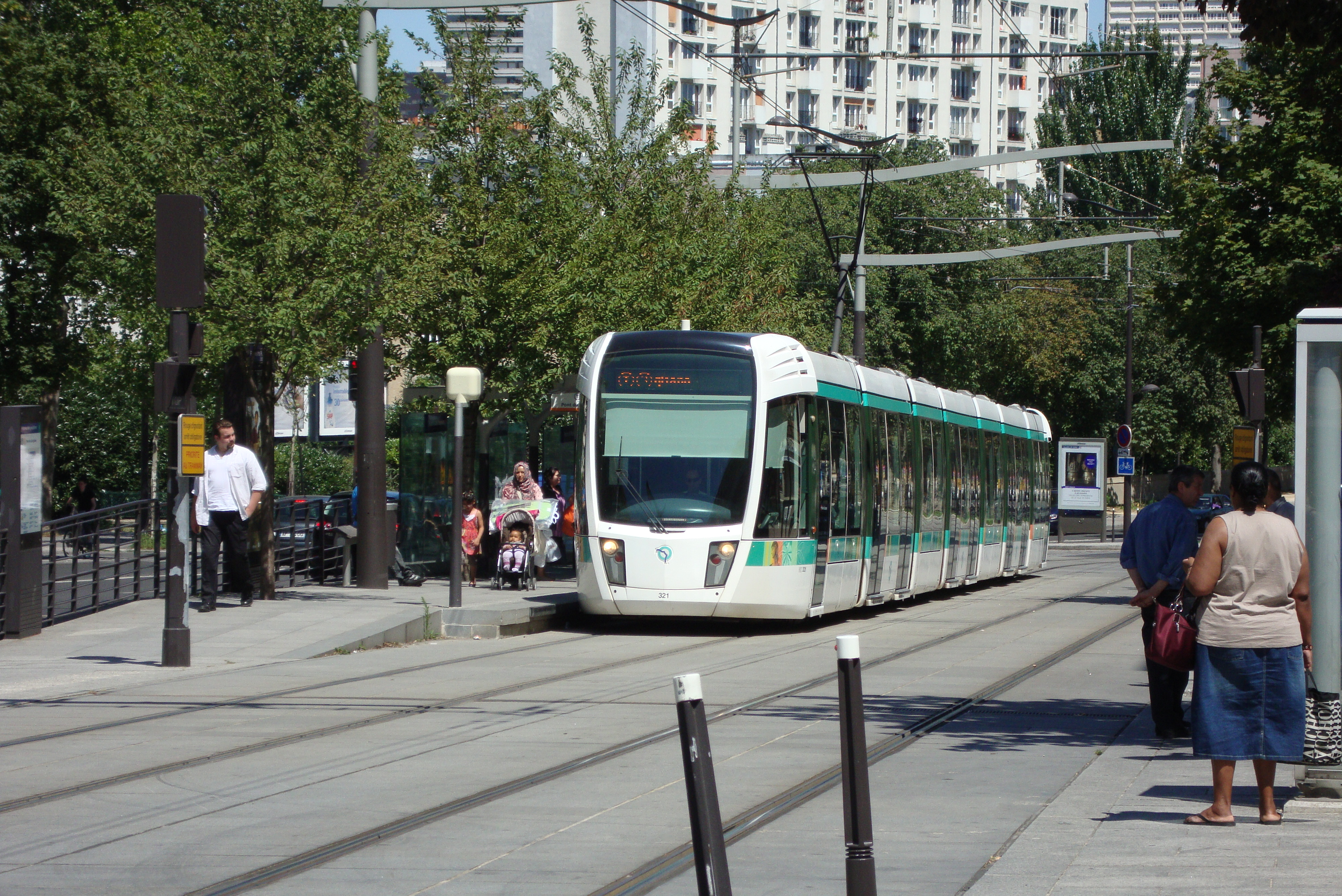
Paris:Line T3

Name of System	Location	Traction Type	Date (From)	Date (To)	Notes
Trams in Fontainebleau	Fontainebleau	Electric	29 Sep 1896	31 Dec 1953	Gauge: 1,000 mm (3 ft 3 3/8 in)
	Melun	Electric	1901	1914	Gauge: 1,000 mm (3 ft 3 3/8 in)
Trams in Paris	**Paris**	Horse	1855	?	
Trams in Paris	**Paris**	Electric	1895	14 Aug 1938	
Tramways in Île-de-France	**Paris**	Electric	6 Jul 1992		Has grown to a system comprising 14 lines, 186.6 kilometres (115.9 mi) of track and 278 stops (2024)
Trams in Versailles	Versailles	Horse	11 Nov 1876	1896	
Trams in Versailles	Versailles	Electric	1896	3 Mar 1957	

== Normandie ==
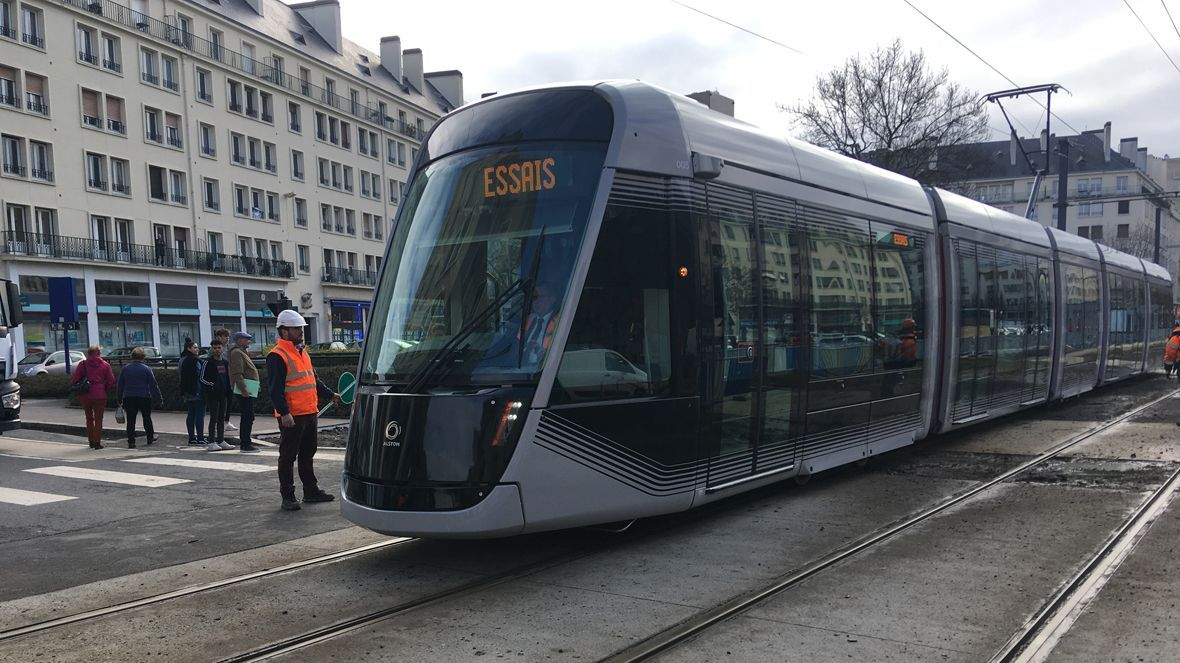
Caen

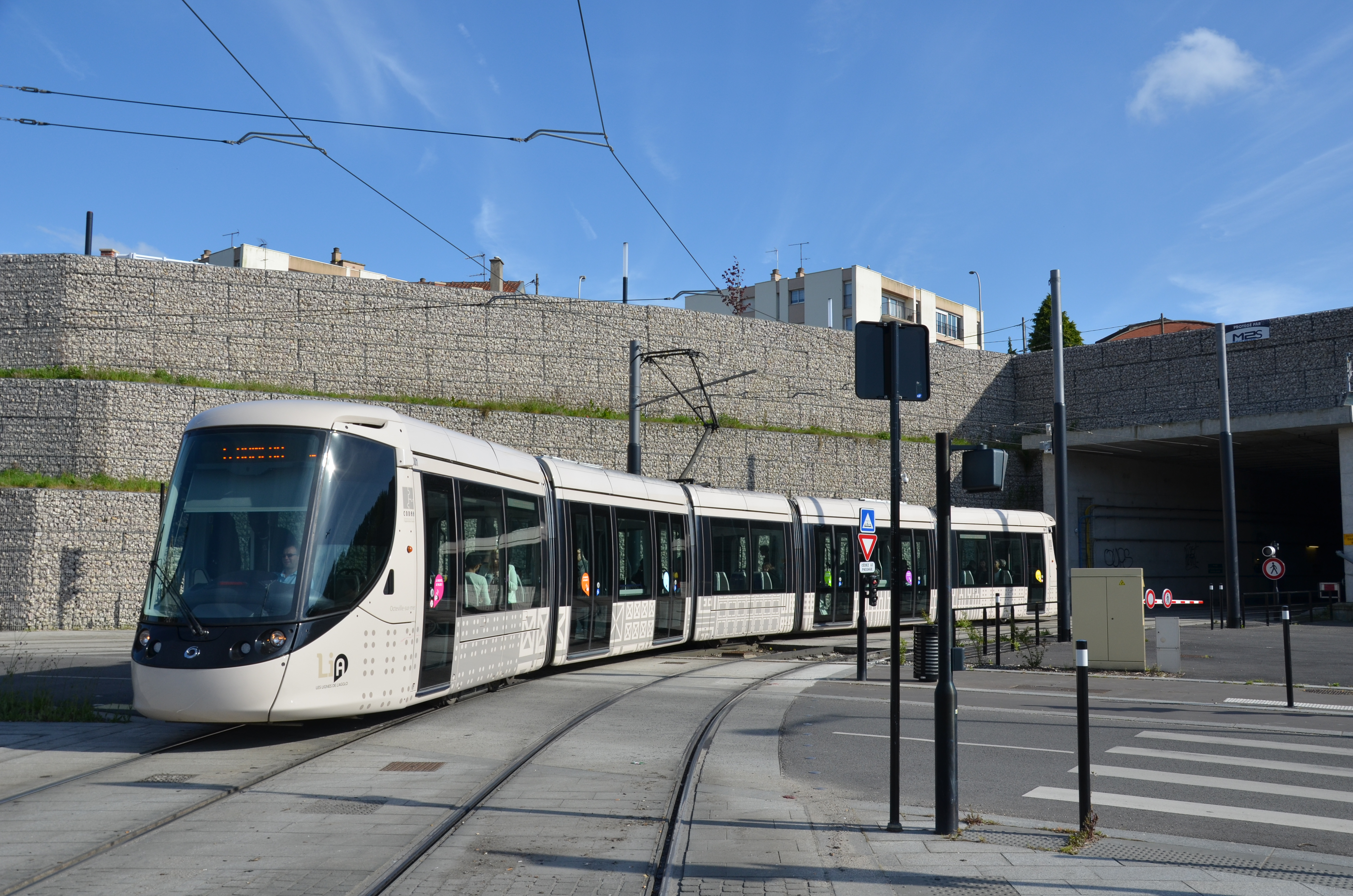
Le Havre

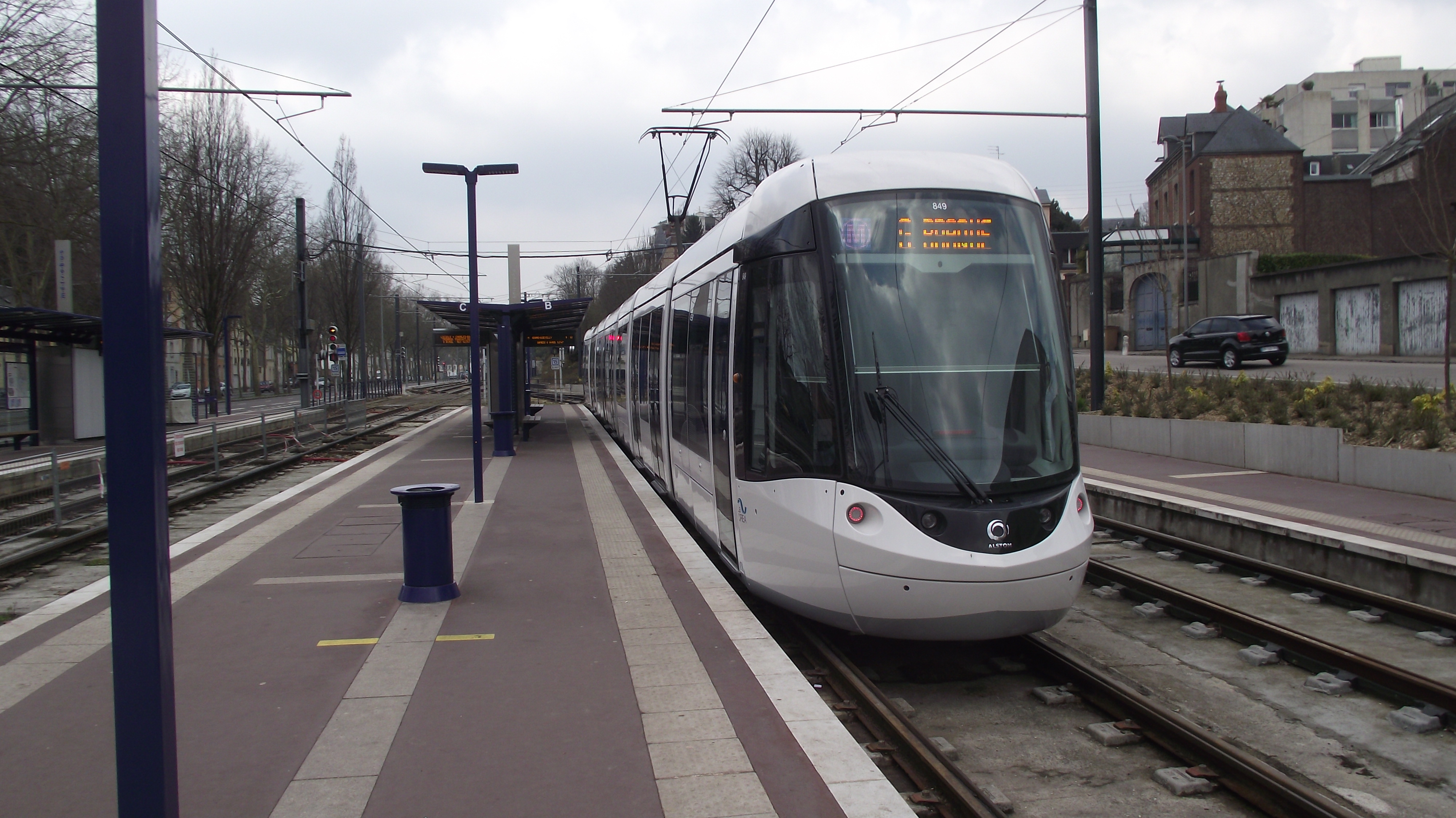
Rouen

Name of System	Location	Traction Type	Date (From)	Date (To)	Notes
	Avranches	Electric	Apr 1907	2 Aug 1914	Gauge: 1,000 mm (3 ft 3 3/8 in)
Trams in Caen	**Caen**	Electric	21 Dec 1901	1937	Gauge: 1,000 mm (3 ft 3 3/8 in)
Caen Guided Light Transit	**Caen**	Electric	15 Nov 2002	31 Dec 2017	The Caen Guided Light Transit was a Bombardier Guided Light Transit system rather than a standard rail-based tram system.
Caen tramway	**Caen**	Electric	27 Jul 2019		Gauge: 1,435 mm. Caen's tramway replaced the former Bombardier Guided Light Transit system after one and a half year of upgrading works.
	Cherbourg	Steam	22 May 1897	2 Aug 1914	Gauge: 1,000 mm (3 ft 3 3/8 in)
	Cherbourg	Electric	1910	1944	Gauge: 1,000 mm (3 ft 3 3/8 in)
	Deauville	Horse	Oct 1876	c.1905	Gauge: 600 mm (1 ft 11 5/8 in)
	Elbeuf	Electric	1898	1926	
	**Le Havre**	Electric	1894	1951	
Le Havre tramway Le Havre's old tramway	**Le Havre**	Electric	12 Dec 2012		
	Le Tréport	Electric	1902	1935	Gauge: 1,000 mm (3 ft 3 3/8 in)
Trams in Rouen	**Rouen**	Horse	29 Dec 1877	1896	
Trams in Rouen	**Rouen**	Electric	1896	28 Feb 1953	
Rouen tramway	**Rouen**	Electric	17 Dec 1994		

== Nouvelle-Aquitaine ==
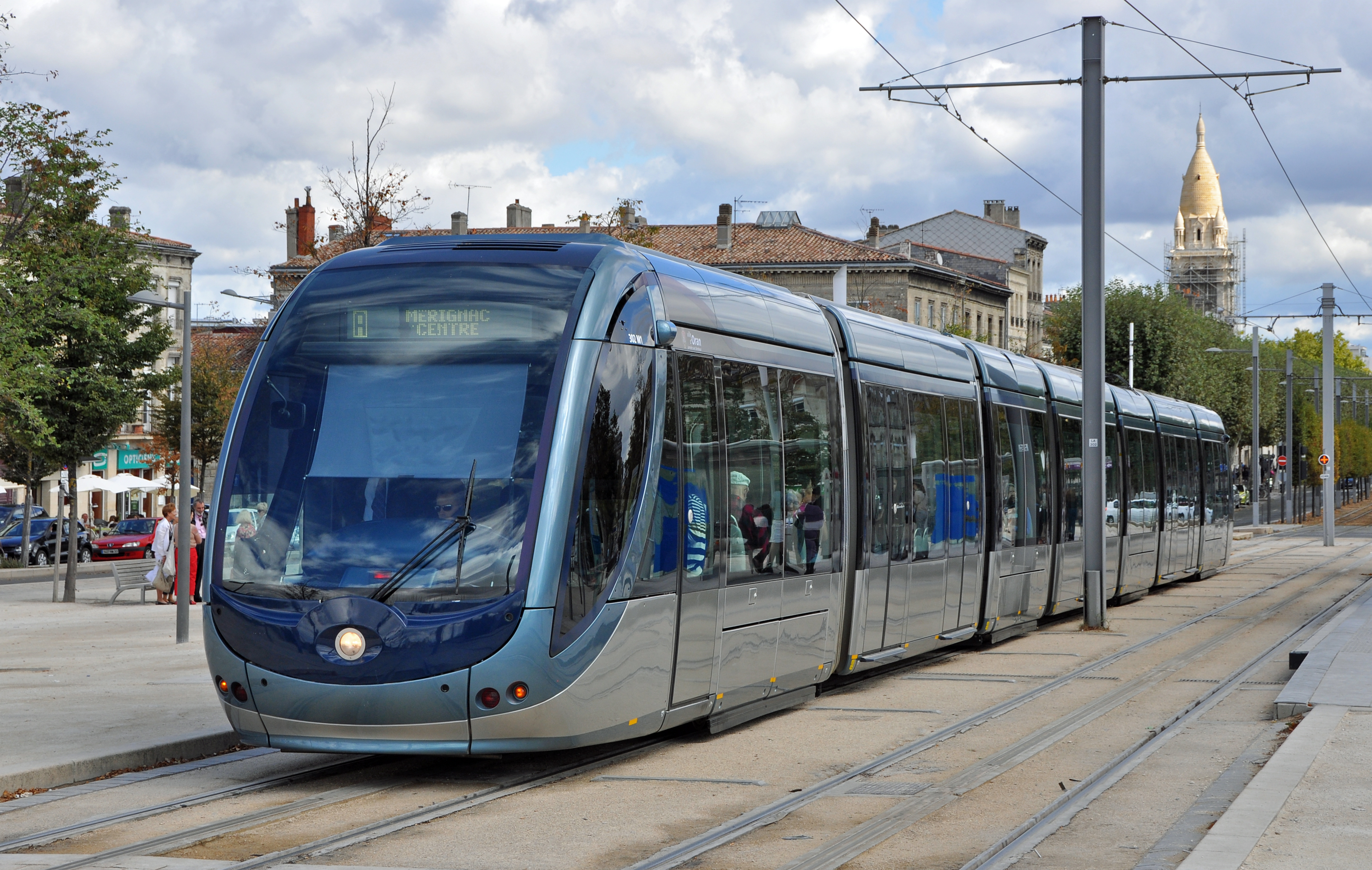
Bordeaux

Name of System	Location	Traction Type	Date (From)	Date (To)	Notes
	Angoulême	Electric	1900	1935	Gauge: 1,000 mm (3 ft 3 3/8 in)
	Arcachon	Electric	6 Aug 1911	1930	Gauge: 1,000 mm (3 ft 3 3/8 in)
B.A.B	Bayonne-Anglet-Biarritz	Steam	2 Jun 1877	23 Apr 1922	
B.A.B	Bayonne-Anglet-Biarritz	Electric	11 Jul 1922	31 Dec 1952	
B.L.B	Bayonne-Anglet-Biarritz	Steam	18 Oct 1888	31 Jan 1914	Gauge: 1,000 mm (3 ft 3 3/8 in)
B.L.B	Bayonne-Anglet-Biarritz	Electric	1 Feb 1914	1 Oct 1948	Gauge: 1,000 mm (3 ft 3 3/8 in)
V.F.D.M	Bayonne-Anglet-Biarritz	Electric	3 Dec 1917	31 Jan 1939	
	**Bordeaux**	Horse	4 May 1880	1901	
	**Bordeaux**	Electric	17 Feb 1900	8 Dec 1958	
Bordeaux tramway	**Bordeaux**	Electric	23 Dec 2003		
	Hendaye	Horse	1906	1907	Gauge: 600 mm (1 ft 11 5/8 in)
	Hendaye	Electric	15 Aug 1908	1 Jan 1937	Gauge: 1,000 mm (3 ft 3 3/8 in)
	Limoges	Electric	6 Jun 1897	2 Mar 1951	Gauge: 1,000 mm (3 ft 3 3/8 in)
	Pau	Electric	8 Sep 1900	1929	Gauge: 1,000 mm (3 ft 3 3/8 in)
	Poitiers	Electric	1899	1947	Gauge: 1,000 mm (3 ft 3 3/8 in)

== Occitanie ==
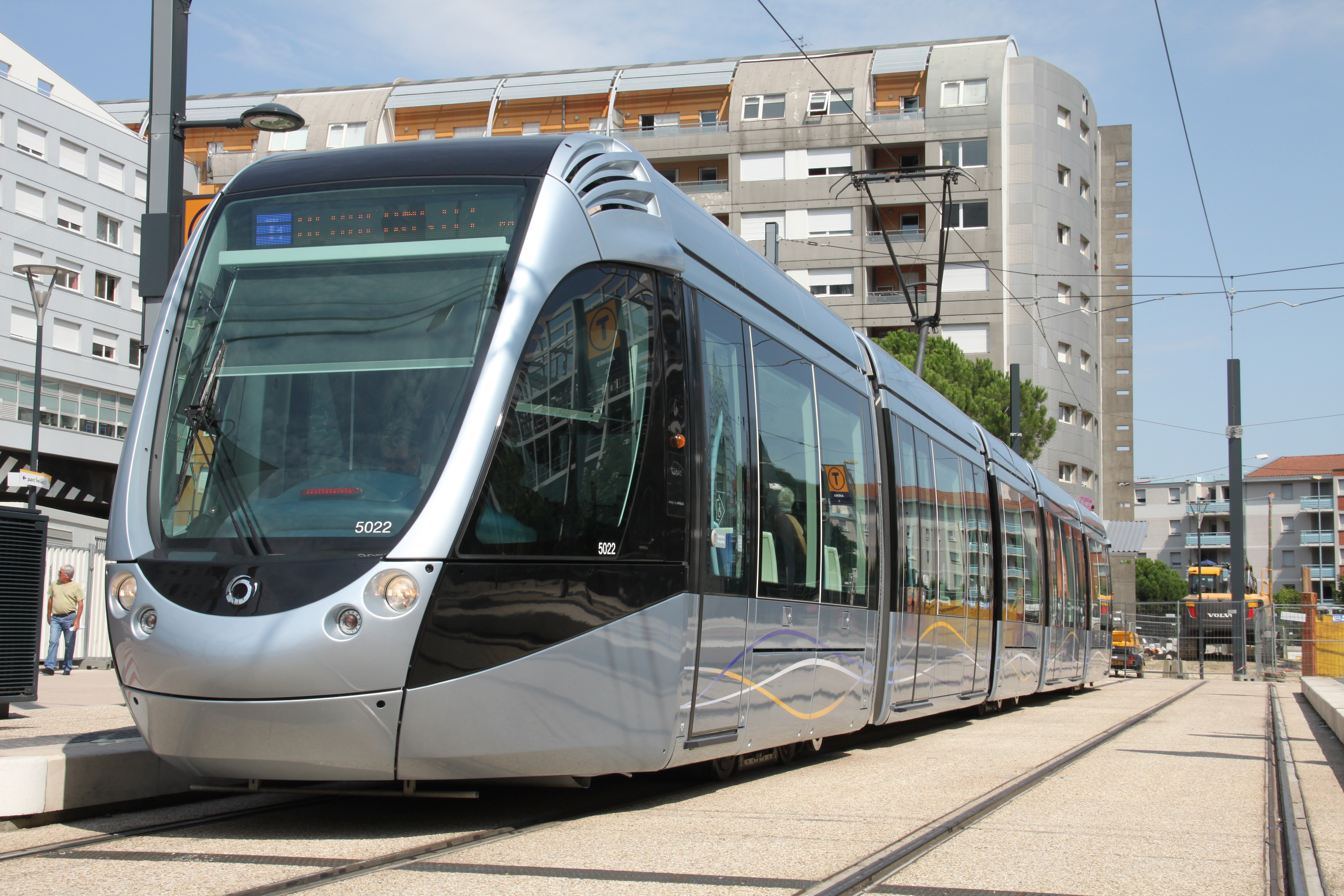
Toulouse

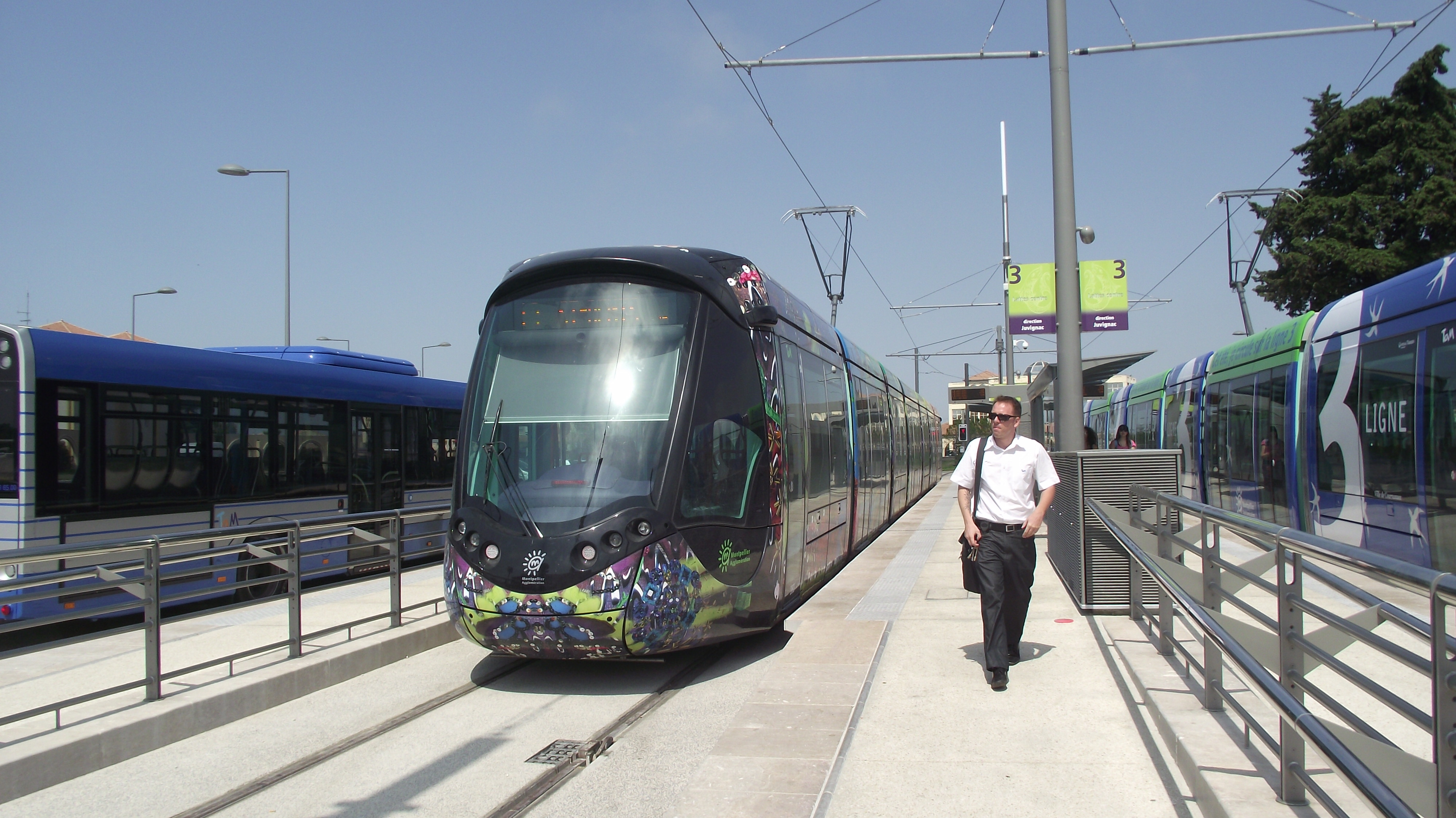
Montpellier

Name of System	Location	Traction Type	Date (From)	Date (To)	Notes
	Aigues-Vives	Steam	?	?	
	Albi	Steam	?	?	
	Albi	Petrol	?	?	
	Lourdes	Electric	1899	1930	Gauge: 1,000 mm (3 ft 3 3/8 in)
	**Montpellier**	Electric	1 Jan 1898	31 Jan 1949	Gauge: 1,000 mm (3 ft 3 3/8 in)
Montpellier tramway	**Montpellier**	Electric	30 June 2000		
	Nîmes	Horse	1880	1900	
	Nîmes	Electric	1899	1950	
	Perpignan	Electric	Sep 1900	Oct 1955	Gauge: 1,000 mm (3 ft 3 3/8 in)
	Rodez	Electric	1902	1920	Gauge: 1,000 mm (3 ft 3 3/8 in)
	Sète	Electric	1901	1935	Gauge: 1,000 mm (3 ft 3 3/8 in)
	**Toulouse**	Horse	31 Jul 1887	?	
	**Toulouse**	Electric	May 1906	7 July 1957	
Toulouse tramway	**Toulouse**	Electric	11 Dec 2010		

== Pays de la Loire ==
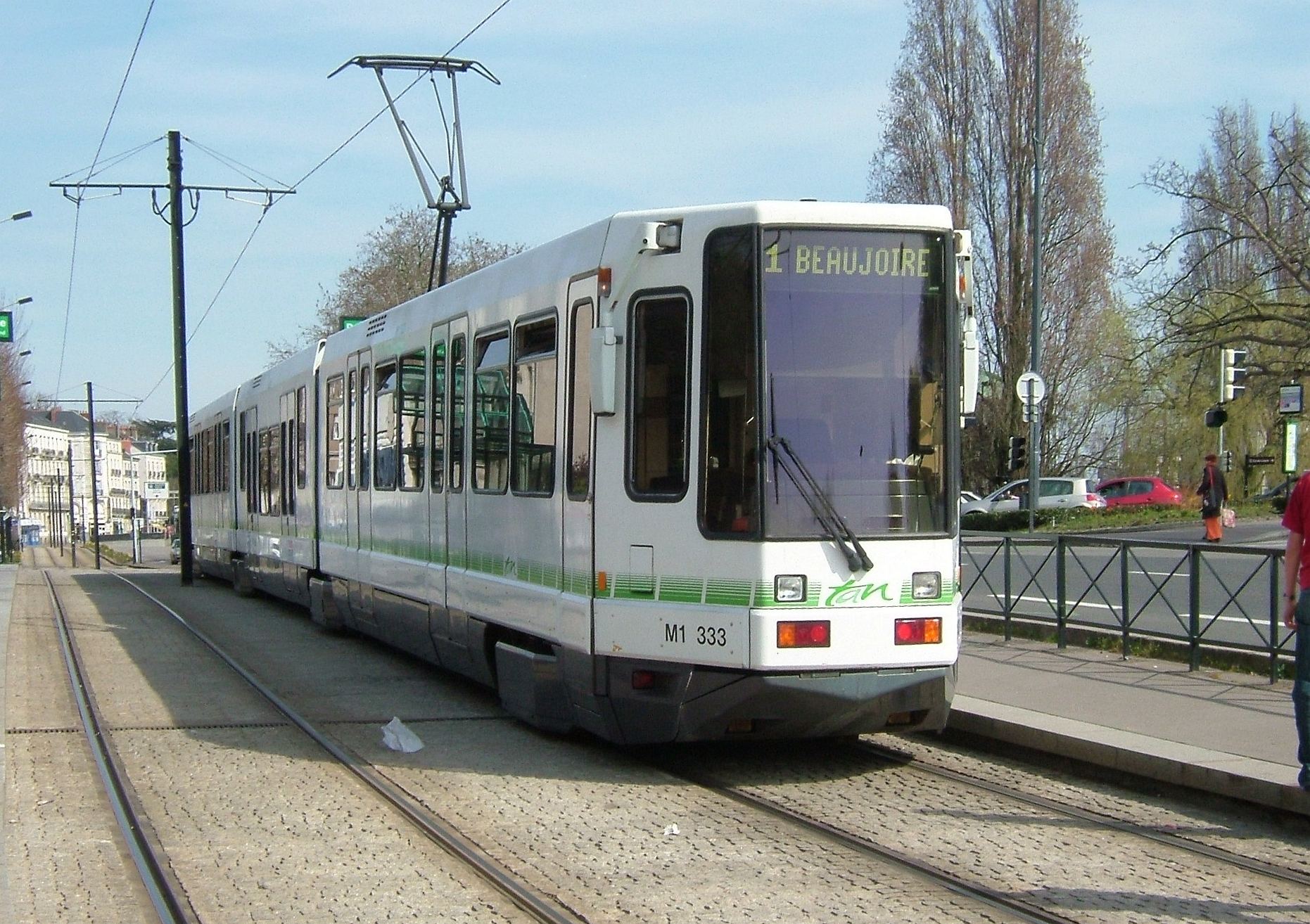
Nantes

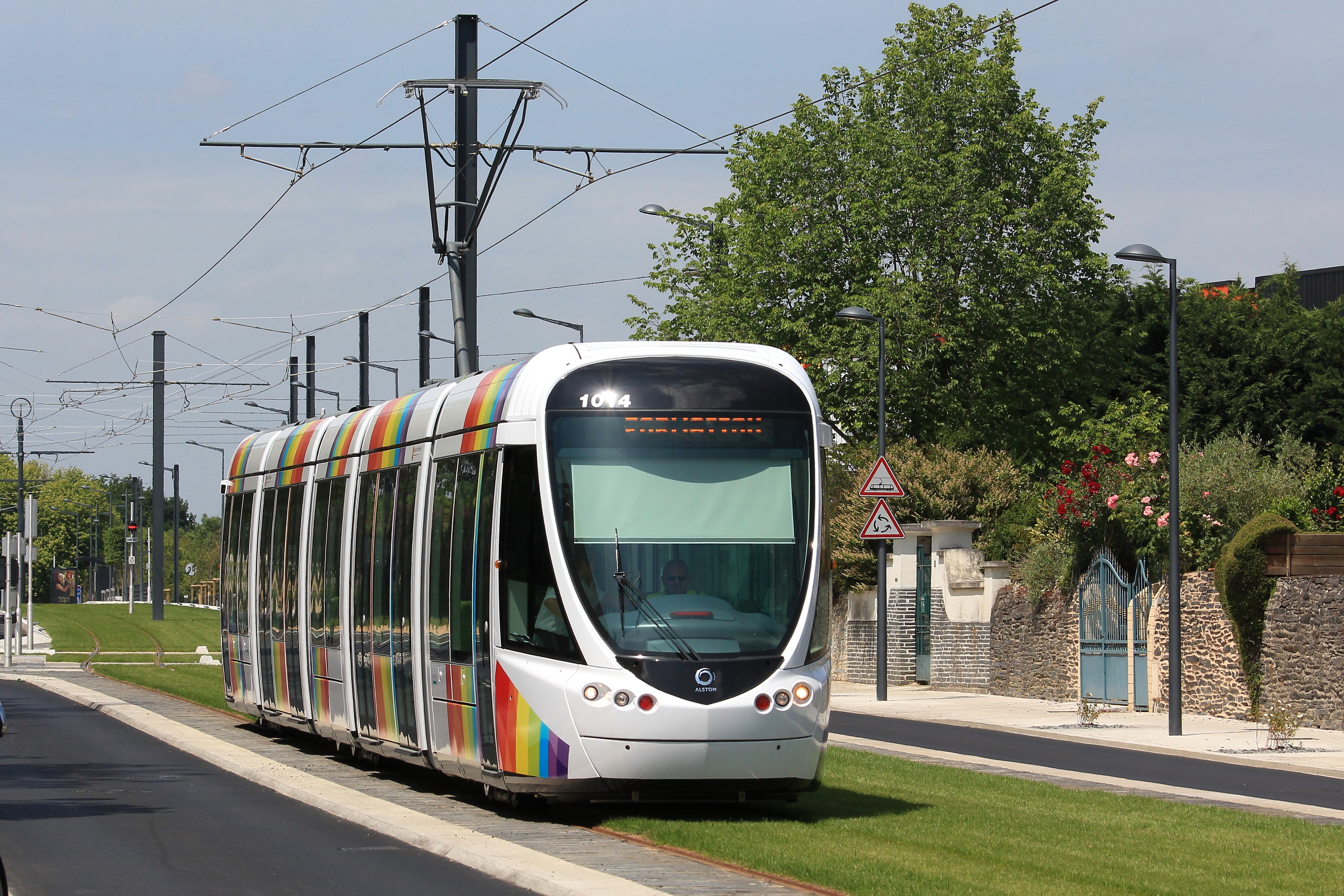
Angers

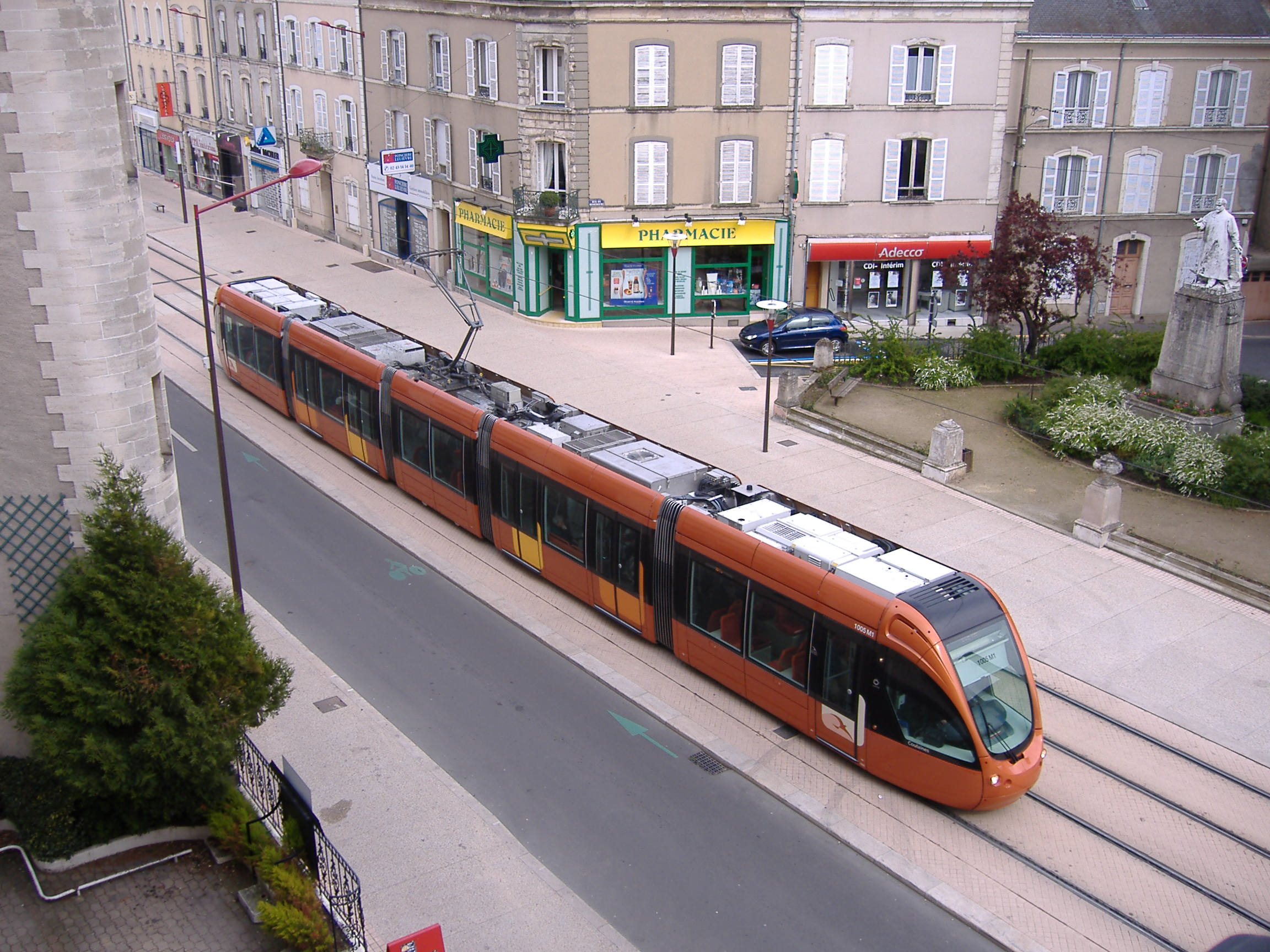
Le Mans

Name of System	Location	Traction Type	Date (From)	Date (To)	Notes
	**Angers**	Electric	21 May 1896	May 1949	
Angers tramway	**Angers**	Electric	25 June 2011		
	**Le Mans**	Electric	1897	1947	Gauge: 1,000 mm (3 ft 3 3/8 in)
Le Mans tramway	**Le Mans**	Electric	17 Nov 2007		
	Les Sables d'Olonne	Electric	1898	1925	Gauge: 1,000 mm (3 ft 3 3/8 in)
	**Nantes**	Compressed air	13 Feb 1879	1917	
	**Nantes**	Electric	1913	25 Jan 1958	
Nantes tramway	**Nantes**	Electric	7 Jan 1985		

== Provence-Alpes-Côte d'Azur ==
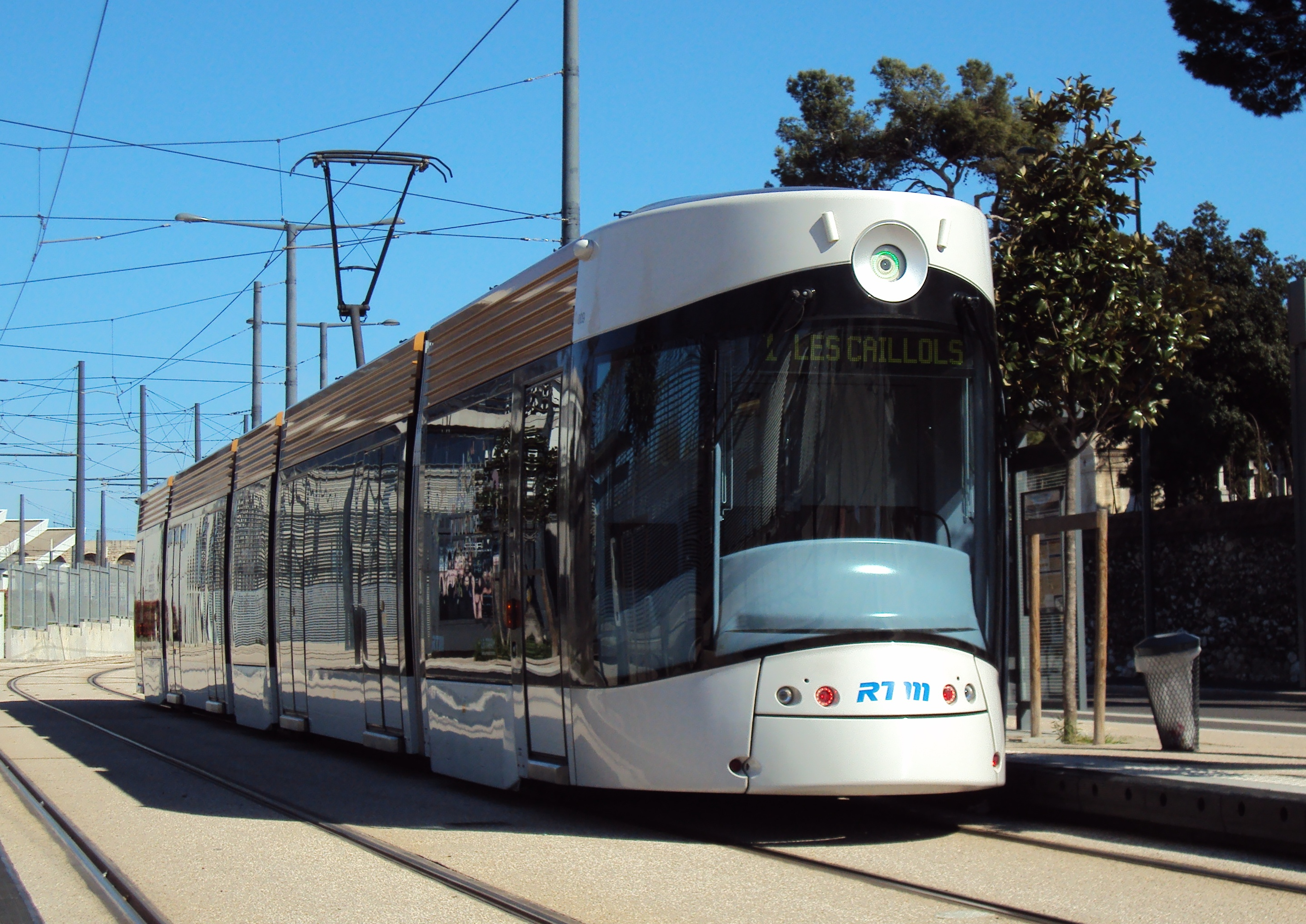
Marseille

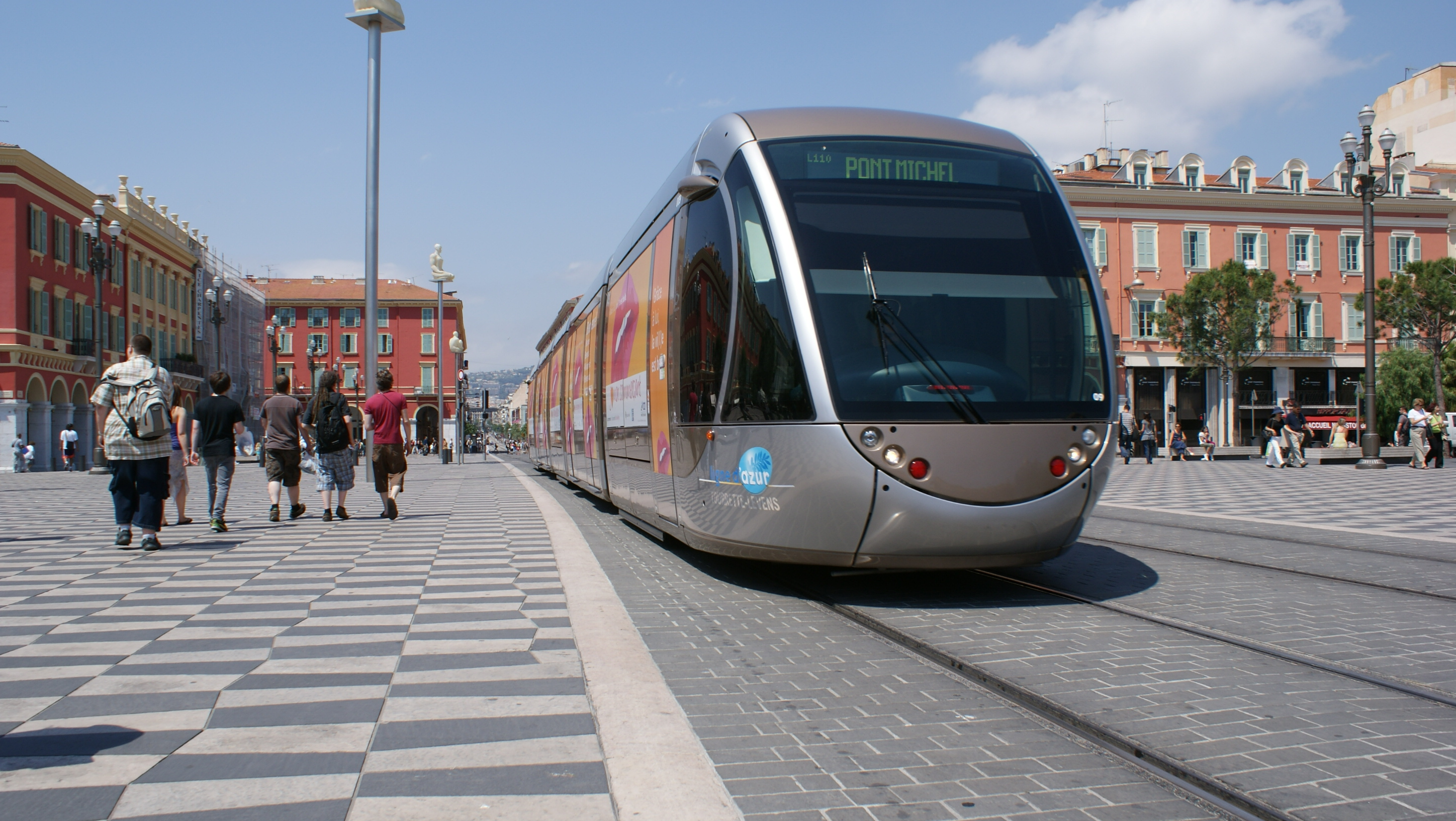
Nice

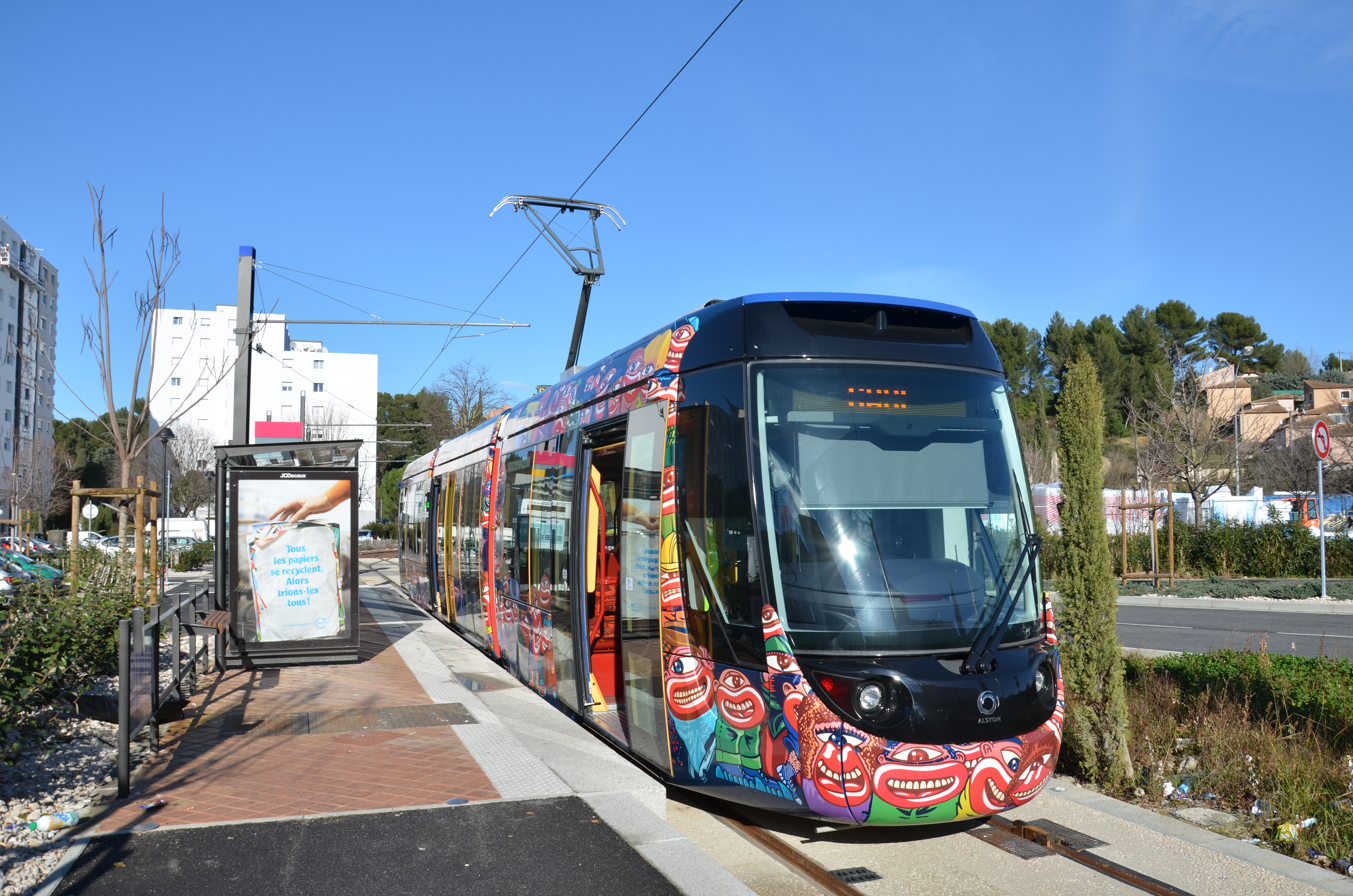
Aubagne

Name of System	Location	Traction Type	Date (From)	Date (To)	Notes
Aubagne tramway	**Aubagne**	Electric	1 sept 2014		
	Avignon	Electric	1901	1932	Gauge: 1,000 mm (3 ft 3 3/8 in); New 1.435 metre standard gauge tramway due to be inaugurated on 19 October 2019.
	Cannes	Electric	1899	1923	Gauge: 1,000 mm (3 ft 3 3/8 in)
	La Ciotat	Electric	1935	1955	
	**Marseille**	Horse	21 Jan 1876	?	
	**Marseille**	Steam	1892	?	
Marseille tramway	**Marseille**	Electric	1900		
Trams in Nice	**Nice**	Horse	27 Feb 1878	?	Gauge: 1,000 mm (3 ft 3 3/8 in)
Trams in Nice	**Nice**	Electric	1900	10 Jan 1953	Gauge: 1,000 mm (3 ft 3 3/8 in)
Nice tramway	**Nice**	Electric	24 Nov 2007		
	Toulon	Horse	Jul 1886	?	
	Toulon	Electric	Jul 1897	15 Apr 1954	

== See also ==
- Trams in France
- List of town tramway systems in Europe
- List of tram and light rail transit systems
- List of metro systems
- List of trolleybus systems in France
- Eu–Mers-les-Bains / Le Tréport tramway
