= Trams in Cannes =

The Tramway de Cannes was a tramway system in the French city of Cannes.The tramway operated in 1900 and stopped in 1933.

At the end of the XIX^{th}, Cannes' population went on increasing and several public transport projects appeared. The first was a horse-drawn omnibus serving Cannes from 1874. These buses operated until the arrival of the tramway in 1899.

On 8 February 1898, after many municipal debates, the Compagnie des Tramways de Cannes (CTC), a subsidiary of the Omnium Lyonnais, and on 3 January 1899 and 20 February 1900 two decrees declared the utility of a line from La Bocca to Golfe-Juan and from Antibes to Vallauris (via Golfe-Juan).

== Network ==
The network of lines spread over 20.24 km. The main line ran parallel to the Mediterranean, leaving La Bocca, traversed Cannes by the Rue Félix Faure, Route d'Antibes then skirted the seaside towards Golfe-Juan et Antibes. The Cannet line began on Place Félix Faure, then reached the PLM station by the Rue de la Gare and the Boulevard Carnot. The Vallauris line started at Vallauris Church, joined the Route de Golfe-Juan and ended at the Gare de Golfe-Juan.

Construction began in 1898 before municipal authorisation. The La Bocca to Golfe-Juan and Cannes to the Cannet lines opened on 25 February 1899

On 21 February 1900, the line from Antibes to Vallauris opened. Running was operated as to link La Bocca to Antibes and extending services from Vallauris to Golfe-Juan into Cannes.

The lines were built as single lines with loops. as a security measure, signaling was installed in 1900 between loops.

In 1907, the line to La Bocca was extended to Mandelieu and opened on 4 December 1907.

The network was not extended after 1907, but in February was linked to the Tramway de Nice (TNL) who opened a line from Cagnes-sur-Mer to Antibes. It was then possible to travel from Mandelieu to Menton by tram by changing twice.

The network was operated normally during World War I and due to the degradation of the track and wires, the line to Mandelieu was entirely rebuilt on reserved track.

== Rolling stock ==
Services on the earliest lines were operated by 16 tramcars, numbered 1 to 16 and built by La Buire of Lyon. The cars were established upon a primitive truck equipped with 2 GE58 35HP engines. This wasn't powerful enough for the high grades encountered on most of the network. Comfort wasn't high as the cabs were situated to high above the trucks and access was provided by doors situated at an angle and tramcars provided two classes.

6 more tramcars were purchased at the end of 1899 to complete the fleet. these were numbered 17 to 22 and had a passenger platform lower than cars 1 to 16 as well as side doors instead of angle doors.

Although accidents lowered the company's reputation, traffic increased and the company purchased 8 trailers to increase passenger capacity. Three more trailers were purchased between 1905 and 1908.

Two tramcars were bought in 1907 to serve the extension to Mandelieu. These two cars were more comfortable than the older cars and were coupled to new trailers.

The fleet of tramcars was insufficient to provide an effective service during the winter season and additional tramcars were rented from other networks (Fontainebleau, Troyes, Poitiers, Pau and Avignon).

The company's older fleet was aging and five new tramcars were purchased in 1913 and numbered 26 to 30. These cars were built by the CIMT and were more modern than their older sisters even if their engines were relatively small. Two new cars were purchased in 1919 (numbered 25 and 31) and were identical to cars purchased by the Tramway de Fontainebleau.

== Disaster and decline ==
On 23 March 1924 the depot was destroyed by a fire and 18 cars (out of 31) was considered irrecoverable. To re-establish service, ten cars were rented from the Tramway de Nice and relinquished for the winter running. To maintain a level of service the CTC bought second hand tramcars, 4 from Melun and 8 from La Seyne-sur-Mer.

This situation made that the Tramway de Cannes' fleet was made of divers stock or poor quality and average speed was low. The first modern bus services began to operate. This made the tramway company's financial situation bad and on 30 March 1927 the CTC was authorised to run its bus service. 6 Saurer and 6 Berliet buses were used to complete tramway services.

Competition was ferocious and the CTC was forced to replace all its trams by buses. Tramways between Cannes (La Source) and Antibes and from La Boca to Mandelieu were bused on 1 December 1930. The city-centre lines disappeared on 11 May 1933.

== Bibliography ==
- Jean Robert (1988). Les Tramways de Nice et de la Côte d'Azur (in French). ASIN B0014JHGYY.
