= Nice tramway (1879–1953) =

Historical public transit system

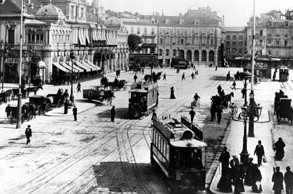
The tramway in Nice

Trams in Nice was the first-generation tramway system serving the city of Nice, France, which operated from 27 February 1879 to 10 January 1953.

The creation of the Compagnie des Tramways de Nice et du Littoral (TNL) was encouraged by the rapid rise in population of Nice and surrounding towns and villages.

The TNL's aim was to build a network linking Nice to several towns along the coast on a 1,000 mm (3 ft 3 3/8 in) metre gauge network. Its lines included:

- Cagnes-sur-Mer – Nice – Beaulieu – Monte Carlo – Menton
- Nice's urban tram network.

== History ==
The tramway began operations on 27 February 1879 using horsecars.

All lines were electrified in 1900 and operated by single-car tramcars. In 1930 the TNL was operating 144 km of lines, 183 tramcars and 96 trailers. At Cagnes, passengers could board trams of Trams in Cannes and travel to Juan-les-Pins, Cannes and Mandelieu.

Unfortunately, the coastal line had heavy bus competition. Coastal lines were replaced by buses as early as 1929, the entire suburban network disappeared in 1934 with many comments from the press saluting the disappearance of this old mean of transport.

Nice Town-Hall decided to slowly close the tramway network and by 1939, only 4 lines remained open. Due to World War II and the requisition of buses, two lines were reopened. The network was then operated by 48 tramcars and 22 trailers. A few tramcars were rebuilt in 1942.

After World War II, the badly maintained tramways were showing their age, which was surprising for such a popular mode of transport in a touristic city such as Nice. Tramways were replaced by trolleybus lines from 1948 and the last tram ran on 10 January 1953.
