= Trams in Fontainebleau =

Plan of the Tramway de Fontainebleau in 1940

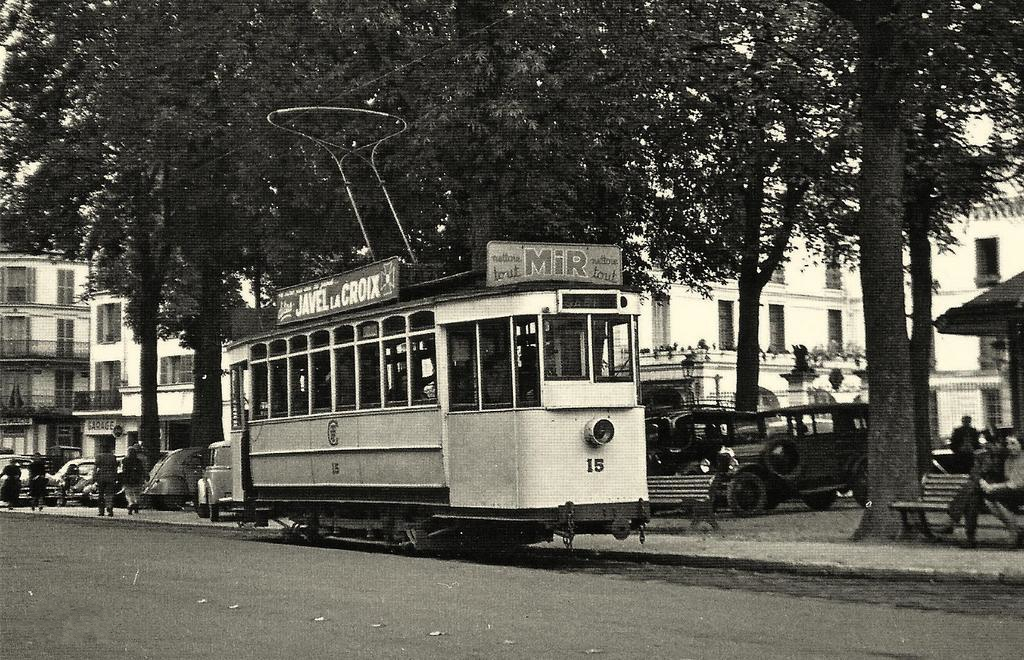
Place Denecourt (currently Napoléon-Bonaparte) with the tramway in the foreground and the Hôtel de l'Aigle Noir in the background

Tramway de Fontainebleau was the public transit system in Fontainebleau, France from 1896 until 1953. At its greatest extent the network comprised three lines.

== History ==
As a royal town, Fontainebleau benefited from an early Metre gauge tram system. The first tramline linked the Château to the train station, and opened on 29 September 1896. On 20 August 1899 an extension was opened to Vulnaines. The third tramline to Samois opened in 1913.

The initial fleet consisted of eight small two-bogie tramcars, capable of carrying 36 passengers, plus six trailers. The motor cars were equipped with two 25 hp motors which gave them relatively high power. In 1910, three more tramcars were bought (numbered 12 to 14); these possessed a Brill truck 2.4 m wide, and were capable of carrying 39 passengers.

In 1924 the CTF purchased four tramcars from the Tramway de Melun, these were subsequently sold to the Tramway de Cannes after a fire had destroyed most of Cannes' fleet.

The extensions to Vulaines and Samois closed in 1937 and the oldest tramcars were scrapped. The following fifteen years were uneventful and no changes to operations were made. Even though the tramway was generally well kept, the bus was proving to be easier to operate and the tram closed on 31 December 1953.

== Tramcars in preservation ==
Fontainebleau tramcar n° 11 is currently preserved in Paris by AMTUIR.

The car was put into service around 1900 on the Tramway de Melun and was one of the batch purchased by Fontainebleau in 1910; it was withdrawn in 1945.

The tramcar was rescued from a scrapyard in Maisons-Alfort and preserved on 26 October 1957.

Tramcar n°11 data
Length	6.74 m
Width	2.04 m
Height	3 m
Gross weight	2 t
Type	Open door closed carriage
Capacity	26/30
Braking	Hand brake
Gauge	1,000 mm (3 ft 3 3/8 in)
Builder	Société de Construction de Matériel de Transports de Douai.
