= List of tram and light rail transit systems =

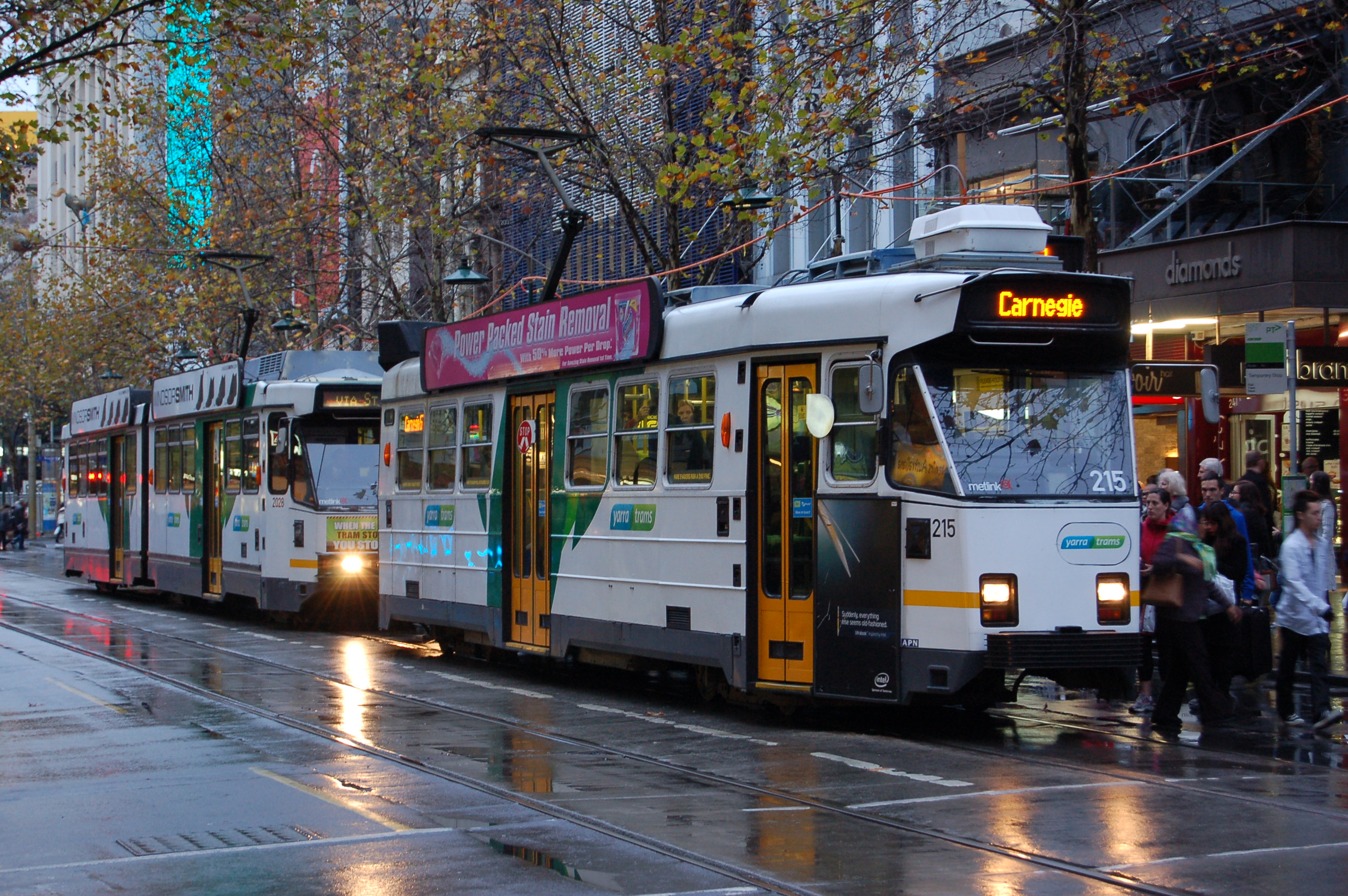
The Melbourne tram network is the longest tram system by route length.

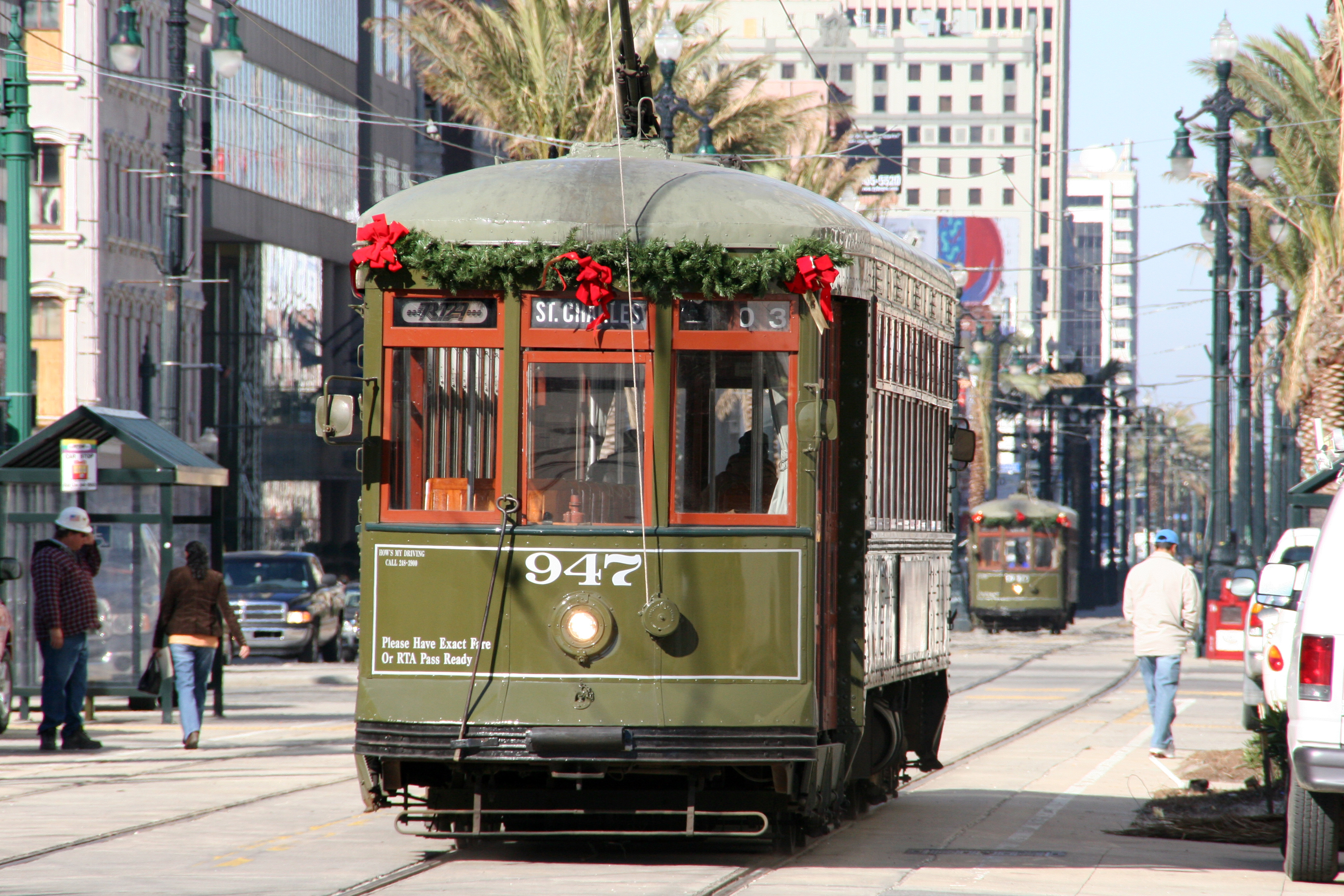
The New Orleans streetcar system was one of the first in the world and it is the oldest system still in operation.

The following is a list of cities that have current tram/streetcar (including heritage trams/heritage streetcars), or light rail systems as part of their regular public transit systems. In other words, this list only includes systems which operate year-round and provide actual transit service, not ones that are primarily tourist services, are seasonal-only, or are excursion-type tram operations.

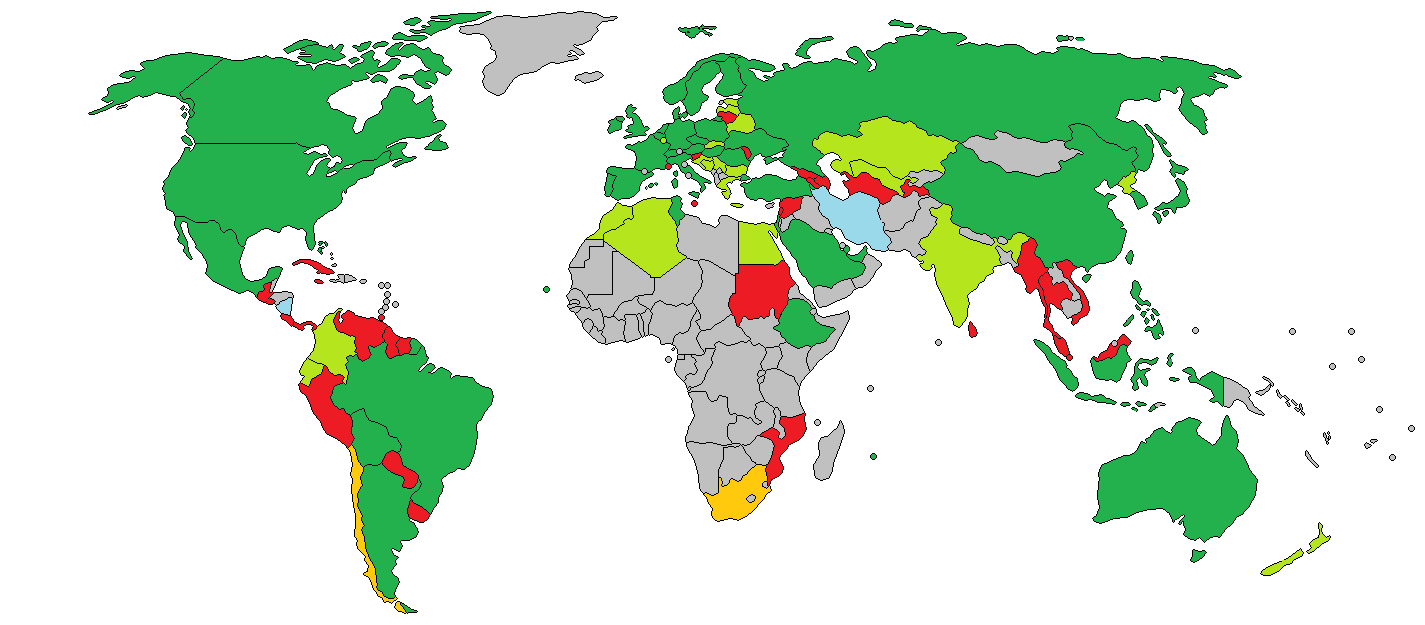
Trams and LRT networks around the world as of 2026 Countries with tram networks, including LRT Countries with tram networks, no LRT Planned networks Only heritage lines Countries that used to have tram networks Never built any electric tram networks

Some transit systems branded as "light rail" such as the Docklands Light Railway in London or the Ampang and Kelana Jaya lines of Kuala Lumpur qualify as metro systems (see medium-capacity rail system) and thus are not listed here – see List of metro systems.

Only currently operational tram and LRT systems are included in this listing – tram and LRT systems that have "suspended operation" or are presently under construction are excluded.

== Legend ==
Location
Primary city served by the tram/streetcar or light rail system.
Country
Sovereign state in which the tram/streetcar or light rail system is located.
System
The English name of the tram system or overview article for city.
Year opened
The year the system opened for passenger service. For older systems, this may refer to horsecar service for those systems continuously in operation since their horsecar era.
Stations
The number of stations in the network, as quoted by the system's operator.
System length
The system length of a tram/streetcar or light rail network is the sum of the lengths of all routes in the rail network in kilometers (or miles). Each section of track is counted only once, regardless of how many lines pass over it, and regardless of whether it is single-track or multi-track, single carriageway or dual carriageway.
Type
Defines whether the system in question is a tram/streetcar system or a light rail transit system (or, in a few cases, whether the system is a heritage streetcar system).

== Africa ==
Location	Country	System	Year opened	Stations	Lines	System length	Annual passengers	Daily passengers	Daily passengers/km (per mile)	Type
Algiers (Note: This city also has a metro/rapid transit system, in addition to its light rail/tram system – see the List of metro systems.)	Algeria	Algiers tramway	2011	38	1	23.2 km (14.4 mi)	21,000,000 (2017)	57,534 (2017)	2,480 (3,991)	Tram
Constantine	Algeria	Constantine tramway	2013	21	1	18.2 km (11.3 mi)	23,700,000 (2024)	64,754 (2024)	3,558 (5,726)	Tram
Mostaganem	Algeria	Mostaganem tramway	2023	24	2	14 km (8.7 mi)	5,900,000 (2024)	16,164 (2024)	1,155 (1,858)	Tram
Oran	Algeria	Oran tramway	2013	32	1	18.7 km (11.6 mi)	12,000,000 (2017)	32,877 (2017)	1,758 (2,829)	Tram
Ouargla	Algeria	Ouargla tramway	2018	16	1	9.7 km (6.0 mi)		15,340 (2018)	1,582 (2,546)	Tram
Sétif	Algeria	Sétif tramway	2018	26	2	22.4 km (13.9 mi)	20,000,000 (2024)	54,645 (2024)	3,595 (5,786)	Tram
Sidi Bel Abbès	Algeria	Sidi Bel Abbès tramway	2017	22	1	13.7 km (8.5 mi)		40,000 (2018)	2,920 (4,700)	Tram
Alexandria	Egypt	Trams in Alexandria	1863	140	20	32 km (20 mi)		50,000 (2017)		Tram/heritage tram
Addis Ababa	Ethiopia	Addis Ababa Light Rail	2015	39	2	31.6 km (19.6 mi)	42,593,675 (2017)	116,695 (2017)	3,432 (5,523)	Light rail
Port Louis and Plaines Wilhems District	Mauritius	Metro Express	2020	21	2	30 km (19 mi)	12,111,804 (2025)	33,183 (2025)	1,106 (1,780)	Light rail
Casablanca	Morocco	Casablanca Tramway	2012	110	4	74 km (46 mi)	92,600,000 (2025)	253,699 (2025)	3,428 (5,517)	Tram
Rabat, Salé	Morocco	Rabat–Salé tramway	2011	43	2	26 km (16 mi)	43,900,000 (2024)	119,945 (2024)	4,613 (7,425)	Tram
Tunis	Tunisia	Tunis Light Metro	1985	80	6	45.2 km (28.1 mi)	28,900,000 (2024)	79,178 (2024)	1,752 (2,820)	Light rail

== Asia ==
All systems in Russia, including those in Asia, are listed together, for convenience, in the Europe section of this article, similarly all systems in Egypt are listed in the Africa section.

Location	Country	System	Year opened	Stations	Lines	System length	Type
Beijing	China	Xijiao line	2017	6	1	8.8 km (5.5 mi)	Light rail
Beijing	China	Yizhuang T1 line	2020	14	1	11.9 km (7.4 mi)	Tram
Changchun	China	Changchun Tram	1941	25	2	13 km (8.1 mi)	Tram/heritage tram
Changchun	China	Changchun Rail Transit (Note: The same system also include metro lines.)	2002	66	3	68.4 km (42.5 mi)	Light rail
Chengdu	China	Chengdu Tram	2018	35	2	39.3 km (24.4 mi)	Tram
Chengdu	China	Anren Tram	2016	6	1	1.8 km (1.1 mi)	Heritage tram
Dalian	China	Dalian Tram	1909	37	2	23.1 km (14.4 mi)	Tram/heritage tram
Dujiangyan	China	Dujiangyan Tram	2024	21	2	17.26 km (10.72 mi)	Tram
Foshan	China	Gaoming Tram	2019	10	1	6.6 km (4.1 mi)	Tram
Foshan	China	Nanhai Tram	2021	15	1	14.3 km (8.9 mi)	Light rail
Guangzhou	China	Haizhu Tram	2014	11	1	7.7 km (4.8 mi)	Tram
Guangzhou	China	Huangpu Tram	2020	26	2	19.2 km (11.9 mi)	Tram
Huai'an	China	Huai'an Modern Tram	2015	23	1	20 km (12 mi)	Tram
Huangshi	China	Huangshi Rail Transit	2022	30	1	26.9 km (16.7 mi)	Tram
Jiaxing	China	Jiaxing Tram	2021	16	1	13.8 km (8.6 mi)	Tram
Jinan	China	Jiyang Line	2025	11	1	36.1 km (22.4 mi)	Light Rail
Lijiang	China	Lijiang Rail Transit	2025	5	1	20.5 km (12.7 mi)	Tram
Mengzi	China	Honghe Modern Tramway	2020	15	1	13 km (8.1 mi)	Tram
Nanjing	China	Nanjing Trams	2014	26	2	17.2 km (10.7 mi)	Tram
Nanping	China	Wuyi Tram	2022	10	1	26.2 km (16.3 mi)	Light rail
Qingdao	China	Qingdao Tram	2016	12	1	9 km (5.6 mi)	Tram
Qiubei	China	Wenshan Tram	2021	11	2	14 km (8.7 mi)	Tram
Sanya	China	Sanya Tram	2019	15	1	8.4 km (5.2 mi)	Tram
Shanghai	China	Songjiang Tram (Note: See Trams in Shanghai for former Shanghai tram network.)	2018	42	2	31 km (19 mi)	Tram
Shenyang	China	Shenyang Modern Tram (Note: See Trams in Shenyang for former Shenyang tram network.)	2013	75	3	65 km (40 mi)	Tram
Shenzhen	China	Shenzhen Tram	2017	21	2	11.7 km (7.3 mi)	Tram
Suzhou	China	Suzhou Tram	2014	41	2	18 km (11 mi)	Tram
Tianshui	China	Tianshui Tram	2020	26	2	29.85 km (18.55 mi)	Light rail
Wuhan	China	Trams in Wuhan	2017	67	3	53.2 km (33.1 mi)	Tram
Hong Kong	Hong Kong	Hong Kong Tramways	1904	120	6	30 km (19 mi)	Tram
Hong Kong	Hong Kong	MTR Light Rail	1988	68	15	36.2 km (22.5 mi)	Light rail
Kolkata	India	Trams in Kolkata	1873	35	2	13.5 km (8.4 mi)	Tram
Jerusalem	Israel	Jerusalem Light Rail	2011	35	1	22.5 km (14.0 mi)	Light rail
Tel Aviv	Israel	Dankal	2023	34	1	24 km (15 mi)	Light rail
Fukui	Japan	Fukui Railway	1933 (Note: Start of tramway operations.)	23	1	21.4 km (13.3 mi)	Interurban/tram-train
Hakodate	Japan	Hakodate City Tram	1897	26	4	10.9 km (6.8 mi)	Tram
Hiroshima	Japan	Hiroden	1912	78	9	35.1 km (21.8 mi)	Tram/interurban
Kagoshima	Japan	Kagoshima City Tram	1912	37	2	13.1 km (8.1 mi)	Tram
Kamakura, Fujisawa	Japan	Enoden	1902	15	1	10 km (6.2 mi)	Interurban
Kitakyushu	Japan	Chikutetsu	1956	16	1	21 km (13 mi)	Interurban
Kōchi	Japan	Tosaden Kōtsū	1904	76	3	25.3 km (15.7 mi)	Tram
Kumamoto	Japan	Kumamoto City Tram	1924	35	2	12.2 km (7.6 mi)	Light rail
Kyoto	Japan	Randen	1910	22	2	11 km (6.8 mi)	Tram/light rail
Kyoto, Ōtsu	Japan	Keishin Line, (Note: Keishin Line connects directly to Tōzai Line of Kyoto Municipal Subway at Misasagi Station, providing a through train rapid transit service to Uzumasa Tenjingawa Station.) Ishiyama Sakamoto Line	1912	27	2	21.6 km (13.4 mi)	Interurban
Matsuyama	Japan	Iyotetsu Tram	1911	27	5	9.5 km (5.9 mi)	Tram
Nagasaki	Japan	Nagasaki Electric Tramway	1915	37	5	11.5 km (7.1 mi)	Tram
Okayama	Japan	Okaden	1912	16	2	4.7 km (2.9 mi)	Tram/light rail
Osaka, Sakai	Japan	Hankai Tramway	1911	41	2	18.4 km (11.4 mi)	Tram
Sapporo	Japan	Sapporo Streetcar	1909	24	4	8.9 km (5.5 mi)	Tram
Takaoka, Imizu	Japan	Manyosen	1948	24	2	12.8 km (8.0 mi)	Tram
Tokyo	Japan	Tokyo Toden	1882	30	1	12.2 km (7.6 mi)	Tram/light rail
Tokyo	Japan	Setagaya Line	1925	10	1	5 km (3.1 mi)	Light rail
Toyama	Japan	Portram	2006	13	1	7.6 km (4.7 mi)	Light rail
Toyama	Japan	Toyama City Tram Line	1913	23	6	7.3 km (4.5 mi)	Tram
Toyohashi	Japan	Toyotetsu City Line	1925	14	2	5.4 km (3.4 mi)	Tram
Utsunomiya, Haga	Japan	Utsunomiya Light Rail	2023	19	1	14.6 km (9.1 mi)	Light rail
Oskemen	Kazakhstan	Ust-Kamenogorsk Tram	1959	31	4	16.5 km (10.3 mi)	Tram
Pavlodar	Kazakhstan	Pavlodar Tram	1965	83	9	86 km (53 mi)	Tram
Temirtau	Kazakhstan	Temirtau Tram	1959		1	10.9 km (6.8 mi)	Tram
Chongjin	North Korea	Trams in Chongjin	1999	3	1	13 km (8.1 mi)	Tram
Pyongyang	North Korea	Trams in Pyongyang	1991	12	3	53.5 km (33.2 mi)	Tram
Wonsan	North Korea	Wonsan Tram	2025	12	1	8.5 km (5.3 mi)	Tram
Al Rayyan	Qatar	Education City Tram	2019	24	3	11.5 km (7.1 mi)	Tram
Doha	Qatar	Msheireb Tram	2019	9	1	2.12 km (1.32 mi)	Tram
Lusail	Qatar	Lusail Tram	2022	25	3	19 km (12 mi)	Light rail
Kaohsiung	Taiwan	Circular light rail	2015	38	1	22.1 km (13.7 mi)	Light rail
New Taipei	Taiwan	New Taipei Metro (Note: Only Danhai LRT and Ankeng LRT is counted)	2018	37	3	9.5 km (5.9 mi)	Light rail
Antalya	Turkey	Antalya nostalgic tramway	1999	11	1	4.7 km (2.9 mi)	Heritage tram
Antalya	Turkey	Trams in Antalya	2009	58	4	47 km (29 mi)	Light rail
Bursa	Turkey	Trams in Bursa	2011	36	3	18.5 km (11.5 mi)	Tram/light rail/heritage tram
Eskişehir	Turkey	EsTram	2004	77	9	57.6 km (35.8 mi)	Tram
Gaziantep	Turkey	Gaziantep Tram	2011	46	3	35 km (22 mi)	Light rail
Istanbul	Turkey	Istanbul Tram (Note: The Istanbul modern tramways (T1, T4 & T5) run only on the European side of Istanbul.) (Note: See Trams in Istanbul (1871-1966) for former Istanbul tram network.)	1992	75	4	44.7 km (27.8 mi)	Tram/light rail
Istanbul	Turkey	Istanbul nostalgic tramways (Note: The Nostalgic tramways of Istanbul consists of two completely separate heritage tram lines, one on the European side (T2, opened in 1990), and the other on the Asian side (T3, opened in 2003).)	1990	15	2	4.2 km (2.6 mi)	Heritage tram
İzmir	Turkey	Tram İzmir	2017	47	3	33.6 km (20.9 mi)	Tram
İzmit	Turkey	Akçaray	2017	16	2	16.2 km (10.1 mi)	Light rail
Kayseri	Turkey	Kayseray	2009	75	4	46 km (29 mi)	Light rail
Konya	Turkey	Konya Tram	1992	42	2	28.9 km (18.0 mi)	Light rail
Samsun	Turkey	Samsun Tram	2010	43	3	36.5 km (22.7 mi)	Light rail
Dubai	United Arab Emirates	Dubai Tram	2014	11	1	10.6 km (6.6 mi)	Tram/light rail
Samarkand	Uzbekistan	Trams in Samarkand	2017	26	2	11.4 km (7.1 mi)	Tram

=== See also ===
- Trams in China
- List of town tramway systems in India
- List of town tramway systems in Japan

== Europe ==
All systems in Kazakhstan and Turkey, including those in Europe, are listed together, for convenience, in the Asia section of this article. All systems in Russia, including those in Asia, are listed together, for convenience, in this section.

Location	Country	System	Year opened	Stations	Lines	System length	Type
Gmunden	Austria	Gmunden Tramway	1894	8	1	17.7 km (11.0 mi)	Tram/Heritage tram/Tram-train
Graz	Austria	Trams in Graz	1878	165	6	70.3 km (43.7 mi)	Tram
Innsbruck	Austria	Trams in Innsbruck	1891	40	6	44 km (27 mi)	Tram
Linz	Austria	Trams in Linz	1880	59	4	30.4 km (18.9 mi)	Tram
Linz	Austria	Pöstlingbergbahn	1898		1	4.1 km (2.5 mi)	Tram/Heritage tram
Vienna	Austria	Trams in Vienna	1865	1168	29	229.6 km (142.7 mi)	Tram
Vienna	Austria	Badner Bahn	1873	36	1	27.2 km (16.9 mi)	Tram-train
Mazyr	Belarus	Mazyr tram	1988	19	1	19.6 km (12.2 mi)	Tram
Minsk	Belarus	Trams in Minsk	1892	54	6	31 km (19 mi)	Tram
Novopolotsk	Belarus	Trams in Navapolatsk	1974	14	1	11 km (6.8 mi)	Tram
Vitebsk	Belarus	Vitebsk tram	1898	115	7	26 km (16 mi)	Tram
Antwerp	Belgium	Antwerp tramway	1873	175	14	88.4 km (54.9 mi)	Tram
Belgian coast	Belgium	Coast Tram	1885	67	1	68 km (42 mi)	Tram/Interurban
Brussels	Belgium	Trams in Brussels	1869	291	18	147.1 km (91.4 mi)	Tram/Heritage tram
Charleroi	Belgium	Charleroi Light Metro	1976 (Note: Converted from a street running Tram)	48	4	25 km (16 mi)	Light rail
Ghent	Belgium	Trams in Ghent	1874		3	32 km (20 mi)	Tram
Liège	Belgium	Trams in Liège	2025	23	1	11.7 km (7.3 mi)	Tram
Sarajevo	Bosnia and Herzegovina	Trams in Sarajevo	1884	37	7	17.3 km (10.7 mi)	Tram
Sofia	Bulgaria	Trams in Sofia	1901	165	15	97.5 km (60.6 mi)	Tram
Osijek	Croatia	Trams in Osijek	1884	41	2	12 km (7.5 mi)	Tram
Zagreb	Croatia	Trams in Zagreb	1891	256	19	58 km (36 mi)	Tram
Brno	Czech Republic	Trams in Brno	1869	147	11	70.2 km (43.6 mi)	Tram
Liberec, Jablonec nad Nisou	Czech Republic	Trams in Liberec and Jablonec nad Nisou	1897	40	1	21.5 km (13.4 mi)	Tram
Most, Litvínov	Czech Republic	Trams in Most and Litvínov	1901	28	4	18.6 km (11.6 mi)	Tram
Olomouc	Czech Republic	Trams in Olomouc	1899	32	7	15 km (9.3 mi)	Tram
Ostrava	Czech Republic	Trams in Ostrava	1894	100	16	65.7 km (40.8 mi)	Tram
Plzeň	Czech Republic	Trams in Plzeň	1899	54	3	21.7 km (13.5 mi)	Tram
Prague	Czech Republic	Trams in Prague	1891	629	35	142.7 km (88.7 mi)	Tram
Aarhus	Denmark	Aarhus Letbane	2017	51	2	110 km (68 mi)	Light rail/Tram-train
Greater Copenhagen	Denmark	Greater Copenhagen Light Rail	2025	29	1	28 km (17 mi)	Light rail
Odense	Denmark	Odense Letbane	2022	26	1	14.5 km (9.0 mi)	Light rail
Ringsted	Denmark	Skjoldenæsholm Tram Museum	1978	6	1	1.8 km (1.1 mi) and 2.0 km (1.2 mi)	Heritage tram
Tallinn	Estonia	Trams in Tallinn	1888 (Note: Tallinn had another, unconnected tram network from 1915 to 1953, when the two networks were connected.)	41	5	19.7 km (12.2 mi)	Tram
Helsinki	Finland	Trams in Helsinki	1891	310	15	110.5 km (68.7 mi)	Tram/Light rail
Helsinki	Finland	Jokeri light rail	2023	34	1	25 km (16 mi)	Light rail
Tampere	Finland	Tampere light rail	2021	33	2	24.6 km (15.3 mi)	Light rail
Angers	France	Angers tramway	2011	42	3	22.4 km (13.9 mi)	Tram
Aubagne	France	Aubagne tramway	2014	7	1	2.8 km (1.7 mi)	Tram
Avignon	France	Avignon tramway	2019	10	1	5.2 km (3.2 mi)	Tram
Besançon	France	Trams in Besançon	2014	31	2	14.5 km (9.0 mi)	Tram
Bordeaux	France	Bordeaux tramway	2003	135	4	79 km (49 mi)	Tram
Brest	France	Brest tramway	2012	39	2	19.4 km (12.1 mi)	Tram
Caen	France	Caen tramway	2019	37	3	16.2 km (10.1 mi)	Tram
Clermont-Ferrand	France	Clermont-Ferrand tramway	2006	34	1	15.7 km (9.8 mi)	Translohr
Dijon	France	Dijon tramway	2012	35	2	19 km (12 mi)	Tram
Grenoble	France	Grenoble tramway	1987	82	5	43.7 km (27.2 mi)	Tram
Le Havre	France	Le Havre tramway	2012	23	2	13 km (8.1 mi)	Tram
Le Mans	France	Le Mans tramway	2007	35	2	18.8 km (11.7 mi)	Tram
Lille (to Roubaix and Tourcoing)	France	Lille tramway	1909	36	2	17.5 km (10.9 mi)	Tram
Lyon	France	Lyon tramway	2001	111	7	83.3 km (51.8 mi)	Tram/Light rail
Lyon	France	Rhônexpress (airport link)	2010	4	1	22 km (14 mi)	Tram/Tram-train
Marseille	France	Marseille tramway	1893 (Note: 2004–2007 passenger service suspended due to upgrade and expansion works; line 68, last surviving portion of the original network, reopened afterwards as part of the current line T1.)	44	3	19.2 km (11.9 mi)	Tram
Montpellier	France	Montpellier tramway	2000	84	4	60.5 km (37.6 mi)	Tram
Mulhouse	France	Mulhouse tramway	2006	29	4	16.2 km (10.1 mi)	Tram/Tram-train
Nantes	France	Nantes tramway	1985	84	3	45.6 km (28.3 mi)	Tram
Nice	France	Nice tramway	2007	46	3	24.2 km (15.0 mi)	Tram
Orléans	France	Orléans tramway	2000	51	2	29.3 km (18.2 mi)	Tram
Paris	France	Tramways in Île-de-France	1992	283	15	196.6 km (122.2 mi)	Tram/Translohr/Tram-train
Reims	France	Reims tramway	2011	24	2	11.2 km (7.0 mi)	Tram
Rouen	France	Rouen tramway	1994	31	1	15.1 km (9.4 mi)	Tram
Saint-Étienne	France	Saint-Étienne tramway	1881	39	3	16.3 km (10.1 mi)	Tram
Strasbourg	France	Strasbourg tramway	1994	87	6	49.1 km (30.5 mi)	Tram
Toulouse	France	Toulouse tramway	2010	25	2	17.2 km (10.7 mi)	Tram
Tours	France	Tours tramway	2013	29	1	14.8 km (9.2 mi)	Tram
Valenciennes	France	Valenciennes tramway	2006	48	2	33.8 km (21.0 mi)	Tram
Augsburg	Germany	Trams in Augsburg	1881	103	5	49.8 km (30.9 mi)	Tram
Bad Schandau	Germany	Kirnitzschtal tramway	1898	13	1	7.9 km (4.9 mi)	Tram
Berlin	Germany	Trams in Berlin (Note: This system also includes two separate lines connecting the towns of Schöneiche bei Berlin (1910) and Woltersdorf (1913), in Brandenburg, east of Berlin.)	1865	800 (about)	22	196.4 km (122.0 mi)	Tram
Bielefeld	Germany	Bielefeld Stadtbahn	1991 (Note: Converted from a street running Straßenbahn)	62	4	38 km (24 mi)	Light rail/Stadtbahn
Bochum, Gelsenkirchen (Note: This system is part of the larger Verkehrsverbund Rhein-Ruhr (VRR) transport network which was founded in 1980 and operates the Rhine-Ruhr Stadtbahn system. The VRR transport network is composed of transit systems in the following cities: Bochum, Castrop-Rauxel, Dortmund, Duisburg, Düsseldorf, Essen, Gelsenkirchen, Hattingen, Herne, Krefeld, Mülheim, Oberhausen, and Witten.)	Germany	Bochum Stadtbahn (Note: This system also serves the neighbouring city of Herne.)	1989	21	1	15.3 km (9.5 mi)	Light rail/Stadtbahn
Bochum, Gelsenkirchen	Germany	Trams in Bochum/Gelsenkirchen (Note: This system also serves the neighbouring cities of Hattingen and Witten.)	1894	208	10	86 km (53 mi)	Tram
Bonn	Germany	Bonn Stadtbahn	1975	81	6	95.8 km (59.5 mi)	Light rail/Stadtbahn
Bonn	Germany	Trams in Bonn	1891		3	29.5 km (18.3 mi)	Tram
Brandenburg an der Havel	Germany	Trams in Brandenburg an der Havel	1897		2	17.6 km (10.9 mi)	Tram
Braunschweig	Germany	Trams in Braunschweig	1879	83	6	35 km (22 mi)	Tram
Bremen	Germany	Trams in Bremen	1876		8	114.6 km (71.2 mi)	Tram
Chemnitz	Germany	Trams in Chemnitz	1880		9	34 km (21 mi)	Tram/Tram-train
Cologne	Germany	Cologne Stadtbahn	1968	235	12	194.6 km (120.9 mi)	Light rail/Stadtbahn
Cottbus	Germany	Trams in Cottbus	1903		4	20.1 km (12.5 mi)	Tram
Darmstadt	Germany	Trams in Darmstadt	1886	76	10	42 km (26 mi)	Tram
Dessau	Germany	Trams in Dessau	1894		2	12.5 km (7.8 mi)	Tram
Dortmund	Germany	Dortmund Stadtbahn	1976	125	8	77.0 km (47.8 mi)	Light rail/Stadtbahn
Dresden	Germany	Trams in Dresden	1872	154	12	134.3 km (83.5 mi)	Tram
Duisburg	Germany	Trams in Duisburg	1881	76	2	60.7 km (37.7 mi)	Tram
Düsseldorf	Germany	Düsseldorf Stadtbahn	1988	100	11	70.4 km (43.7 mi)	Light rail/Stadtbahn
Düsseldorf	Germany	Trams in Düsseldorf	1876	178	7	79.8 km (49.6 mi)	Tram
Erfurt	Germany	Erfurt Stadtbahn	1997		6	45.2 km (28.1 mi)	Tram
Essen	Germany	Essen Stadtbahn (Note: This system also serves the neighbouring city of Mülheim.)	1977		3	21.5 km (13.4 mi)	Light rail/Stadtbahn
Essen	Germany	Trams in Essen	1893		7	52.5 km (32.6 mi)	Tram
Frankfurt am Main	Germany	Frankfurt U-Bahn	1968	86	9	64.9 km (40.3 mi)	Rapid transit/Light rail/Stadtbahn
Frankfurt am Main	Germany	Trams in Frankfurt am Main	1872	136	10	67.5 km (41.9 mi)	Tram
Frankfurt (Oder)	Germany	Trams in Frankfurt (Oder)	1898	73	5	19.5 km (12.1 mi)	Tram
Freiburg im Breisgau	Germany	Trams in Freiburg im Breisgau	1901	64	5	36.7 km (22.8 mi)	Tram
Gera	Germany	Trams in Gera	1883		3	18.5 km (11.5 mi)	Tram
Görlitz	Germany	Trams in Görlitz	1882		2	11.8 km (7.3 mi)	Tram
Gotha	Germany	Trams in Gotha	1894	30	5	27 km (17 mi)	Tram
Halberstadt	Germany	Trams in Halberstadt	1887		2	11.7 km (7.3 mi)	Tram
Halle	Germany	Trams in Halle	1882		12	87.6 km (54.4 mi)	Tram
Heidelberg	Germany	Trams in Heidelberg	1885		6	30.9 km (19.2 mi)	Tram
Hanover	Germany	Hanover Stadtbahn	1975	196	15	123 km (76 mi)	Light rail/Stadtbahn
Jena	Germany	Trams in Jena	1901	48	5	23.5 km (14.6 mi)	Tram
Karlsruhe	Germany	Karlsruhe Stadtbahn (Note: This system also serves the neighbouring city of Heilbronn.) (see also: Karlsruhe model)	1992	190	17	262.4 km (163.0 mi)	Light rail/Stadtbahn
Karlsruhe	Germany	Trams in Karlsruhe	1877		8	79.9 km (49.6 mi)	Tram
Kassel	Germany	Kassel RegioTram	2007		3	184 km (114 mi)	Tram-train
Kassel	Germany	Trams in Kassel	1877	127	7	53 km (33 mi)	Tram
Krefeld	Germany	Trams in Krefeld	1883		4	37.7 km (23.4 mi)	Tram
Leipzig	Germany	Trams in Leipzig	1872	510	15	143.5 km (89.2 mi)	Tram
Magdeburg	Germany	Trams in Magdeburg	1877	131	10	67.2 km (41.8 mi)	Tram
Mainz	Germany	Trams in Mainz	1883	42	5	29.7 km (18.5 mi)	Tram
Mannheim, Ludwigshafen	Germany	Trams in Mannheim/Ludwigshafen (Note: This system also includes two interurban routes connecting the cities of Heidelberg, Weinheim, Heddesheim, and Bad Dürkheim, in Rhine-Neckar Metropolitan Region, via the Upper Rhine Railway (OEG) and the Rhein-Haardt Railway (RHB).)	1878		14	103.4 km (64.2 mi)	Tram/Interurban
Mülheim, Oberhausen	Germany	Trams in Mülheim/Oberhausen	1897			37.5 km (23.3 mi)	Tram
Munich	Germany	Trams in Munich	1876	165	13	80.4 km (50.0 mi)	Tram
Naumburg	Germany	Trams in Naumburg	1892	9	1	2.9 km (1.8 mi)	Heritage tram
Nordhausen	Germany	Trams in Nordhausen	1900		3	18 km (11 mi)	Tram/Tram-train
Nuremberg	Germany	Trams in Nuremberg	1881	74	7	38.4 km (23.9 mi)	Tram
Plauen	Germany	Trams in Plauen	1894	40	6	16 km (9.9 mi)	Tram
Potsdam	Germany	Trams in Potsdam	1880	127	7	29.9 km (18.6 mi)	Tram
Rostock	Germany	Trams in Rostock	1881	64	6	35.6 km (22.1 mi)	Tram
Saarbrücken	Germany	Saarbahn	1997	34	1	44.0 km (27.3 mi)	Stadtbahn/Tram-train
Schwerin	Germany	Trams in Schwerin	1908	37	4	21 km (13 mi)	Tram/Light rail
Strausberg	Germany	Strausberg Railway	1893	10	1	6.2 km (3.9 mi)	Tram
Stuttgart	Germany	Stuttgart Stadtbahn	1985	200	15	133.3 km (82.8 mi)	Light rail/Stadtbahn
Ulm	Germany	Trams in Ulm	1897	23	2	19.1 km (11.9 mi)	Tram
Würzburg	Germany	Trams in Würzburg	1892	46	5	19.7 km (12.2 mi)	Tram
Zwickau	Germany	Trams in Zwickau (Note: Vogtlandbahn trains share a section, about 1.1 km, of this system (see also: Zwickau Model).)	1894	40	4	19.6 km (12.2 mi)	Tram
Athens	Greece	Athens Tram	2004	61	2	32.4 km (20.1 mi)	Tram
Budapest	Hungary	Trams in Budapest	1866	630	36	158.4 km (98.4 mi)	Tram
Debrecen	Hungary	Trams in Debrecen	1911	25	2	8.8 km (5.5 mi)	Tram
Miskolc	Hungary	Trams in Miskolc	1897	22	2	13.5 km (8.4 mi)	Tram
Szeged	Hungary	Trams in Szeged	1908	49	4	17 km (11 mi)	Tram
Szeged, Hódmezővásárhely	Hungary	Szeged-Hódmezővásárhely Tram-train	2021	6	1	3.5 km (2.2 mi)	Tram-train
Dublin	Ireland	Luas	2004	54	2	42.1 km (26.2 mi)	Tram/Light rail
Bergamo	Italy	Bergamo–Albino light rail	2009	16	1	12.5 km (7.8 mi)	Light rail
Cagliari	Italy	Cagliari light rail	2008	9	2	12.3 km (7.6 mi)	Light rail
Florence	Italy	Trams in Florence	2010	43	2	19.3 km (12.0 mi)	Tram
Messina	Italy	Trams in Messina	2003	18	1	7.7 km (4.8 mi)	Tram
Mestre	Italy	Trams in Mestre	2010	18	2	6.3 km (3.9 mi)	Translohr
Milan	Italy	Trams in Milan	1881	654	17	157 km (98 mi)	Tram
Naples	Italy	Trams in Naples	1875		3	11.8 km (7.3 mi)	Tram
Padua	Italy	Trams in Padua	2007	25	1	10.4 km (6.5 mi)	Translohr
Palermo	Italy	Trams in Palermo	2015	44	4	18.3 km (11.4 mi)	Tram
Ritten	Italy	Rittnerbahn	1907	5	1	6.6 km (4.1 mi)	Heritage tram/Light railway
Rome	Italy	Rome–Giardinetti railway	1916	12	1	5.4 km (3.4 mi)	Tram-train/Light rail
Rome	Italy	Trams in Rome	1877	192	6	39 km (24 mi)	Tram
Sassari	Italy	Metrosassari	2006	8	1	4.3 km (2.7 mi)	Tram-train
Trieste	Italy	Trieste–Opicina tramway	1902	13	1	5.2 km (3.2 mi)	Tram/Funicular hybrid
Turin	Italy	Trams in Turin	1871	211	10	88 km (55 mi)	Tram
Daugavpils	Latvia	Daugavpils Satiksme	1946	42	5	29.1 km (18.1 mi)	Tram
Liepāja	Latvia	Liepājas tramvajs	1899	14	1	7.9 km (4.9 mi)	Tram
Riga	Latvia	Trams in Riga	1901	227	6	124 km (77 mi)	Tram
Luxembourg	Luxembourg	Trams in Luxembourg	2017	24	1	16.4 km (10.2 mi)	Tram
Amsterdam	Netherlands	Trams in Amsterdam	1875	503	15	96.7 km (60.1 mi)	Tram
Rotterdam	Netherlands	Trams in Rotterdam	1878	322	9	75 km (47 mi)	Tram
Rotterdam, The Hague	Netherlands	RandstadRail	2006	43	4	71 km (44 mi)	Tram-train
The Hague	Netherlands	Trams in The Hague	1864	204	12	105 km (65 mi)	Tram/Light rail
Utrecht	Netherlands	Utrechtse sneltram	1983	25	3	28.7 km (17.8 mi)	Light rail
Bergen	Norway	Bergen Light Rail	2010	35	2	28.4 km (17.6 mi)	Light rail
Oslo	Norway	Trams in Oslo	1875	99	6	41.8 km (26.0 mi)	Tram
Trondheim	Norway	Trondheim Tramway	1901	21	1	8.8 km (5.5 mi)	Tram
Bydgoszcz	Poland	Trams in Bydgoszcz	1888	61	11	40.8 km (25.4 mi)	Tram
Częstochowa	Poland	Trams in Częstochowa	1959	32	3	14.7 km (9.1 mi)	Tram
Elbląg	Poland	Trams in Elbląg	1895	35	5	16.9 km (10.5 mi)	Tram
Gdańsk	Poland	Trams in Gdańsk	1873	211	11	59.9 km (37.2 mi)	Tram
Gorzów Wielkopolski	Poland	Trams in Gorzów Wielkopolski	1899	28	4	13 km (8.1 mi)	Tram
Grudziądz	Poland	Trams in Grudziądz	1896	20	1	9 km (5.6 mi)	Tram
Katowice and its area	Poland	Silesian Interurbans	1898	323	27	178.4 km (110.9 mi)	Tram/Interurban
Kraków	Poland	Trams in Kraków	1903	358	22	93.8 km (58.3 mi)	Tram
Kraków	Poland	Kraków Fast Tram	2008		3		Light rail
Łódź	Poland	Trams in Łódź	1898	230	24	124.1 km (77.1 mi)	Tram/Interurban
Mrozy	Poland	Horse tram in Mrozy	2012	2	1	1.75 km (1.09 mi)	Heritage horse tram
Olsztyn	Poland	Trams in Olsztyn	2015	32	5	17 km (11 mi)	Tram
Poznań	Poland	Trams in Poznań	1880		18	66.7 km (41.4 mi)	Tram
Poznań	Poland	Poznań Fast Tram	1997	8	4	8.1 km (5.0 mi)	Light rail
Szczecin	Poland	Trams in Szczecin	1879	95	12	52.5 km (32.6 mi)	Tram
Szczecin	Poland	Szczecin fast tram	2015	4	3	4 km (2.5 mi)	Light rail
Toruń	Poland	Trams in Toruń	1891	44	7	22 km (14 mi)	Tram
Warsaw	Poland	Trams in Warsaw	1908	544	27	133.8 km (83.1 mi)	Tram
Warsaw	Poland	Warsaw Commuter Railway	1927	28	2	36 km (22 mi)	Light rail
Wrocław	Poland	Trams in Wrocław	1877	382	23	85.5 km (53.1 mi)	Tram
Almada, Seixal	Portugal	Metro Transportes do Sul	2007	19	3	13.5 km (8.4 mi)	Light rail
Lisbon	Portugal	Trams in Lisbon	1901	84	6	27.7 km (17.2 mi)	Tram
Porto	Portugal	Porto Metro	2002	81	6	80 km (50 mi)	Light rail
Porto	Portugal	Trams in Porto	1895		3	14 km (8.7 mi)	Heritage tram
Sintra	Portugal	Trams in Sintra	1904	8	1	12.7 km (7.9 mi)	Heritage tram
Arad	Romania	Trams in Arad	1946	64		48 km (30 mi)	Tram
Brăila	Romania	Tram in Brăila	1900	36		22.3 km (13.9 mi)	Tram
Bucharest	Romania	Bucharest Light rail	1871	785		137 km (85 mi)	Tram/Light rail
Cluj-Napoca	Romania	Trams in Cluj-Napoca	1987	19	3	11.7 km (7.3 mi)	Tram
Craiova	Romania	Trams in Craiova	1987	19	3	18 km (11 mi)	Tram
Galați	Romania	Trams in Galați	1900	37		20 km (12 mi)	Tram
Iași	Romania	Trams in Iași	1900	56	9	35 km (22 mi)	Tram
Oradea	Romania	Trams in Oradea	1906	37		22.8 km (14.2 mi)	Tram
Ploiești	Romania	Trams in Ploiești	1987	25	2	10 km (6.2 mi)	Tram
Reșița	Romania	Trams in Reșița	1988		1	10 km (6.2 mi)	Tram
Timișoara	Romania	Transport in Timișoara	1869	85		38 km (24 mi)	Tram
Achinsk	Russia	Achinsk tram	1967	24	3	14.5 km (9.0 mi)	Tram
Angarsk	Russia	Angarsk tram	1953		5	34 km (21 mi)	Tram
Barnaul	Russia	Trams in Barnaul	1948		8	55 km (34 mi)	Tram
Biysk	Russia	Biysk tram	1960			33 km (21 mi)	Tram
Chelyabinsk	Russia	Chelyabinsk tram	1932			65 km (40 mi)	Tram
Cherepovets	Russia	Cherepovets tram	1956			14.1 km (8.8 mi)	Tram
Cheryomushki	Russia	Cheryomushki tram	1991		1	5.5 km (3.4 mi)	Tram
Irkutsk	Russia	Trams in Irkutsk	1947		7	22.5 km (14.0 mi)	Tram
Izhevsk	Russia	Trams in Izhevsk	1935		11	32 km (20 mi)	Tram/Light rail
Kaliningrad	Russia	Trams in Kaliningrad	1881			12.5 km (7.8 mi)	Tram
Kazan	Russia	Kazan tram	1899			61.8 km (38.4 mi)	Tram
Kemerovo	Russia	Kemerovo tram	1940			42 km (26 mi)	Tram
Khabarovsk	Russia	Trams in Khabarovsk	1956		3	34 km (21 mi)	Tram
Kolomna	Russia	Kolomna tram	1948			18.5 km (11.5 mi)	Tram
Krasnodar	Russia	Krasnodar tram	1900			53 km (33 mi)	Tram
Krasnoturyinsk	Russia	Krasnoturinsk tram	1954			3.6 km (2.2 mi)	Tram
Krasnoyarsk	Russia	Trams in Krasnoyarsk	1958		4	23.4 km (14.5 mi)	Tram
Kursk	Russia	Kursk tram	1898			37 km (23 mi)	Tram
Lipetsk	Russia	Lipetsk tram	1947			30.8 km (19.1 mi)	Tram
Magnitogorsk	Russia	Magnitogorsk tram	1935			78.2 km (48.6 mi)	Tram
Moscow	Russia	Trams in Moscow	1872			208.5 km (129.6 mi)	Tram
Naberezhnye Chelny	Russia	Naberezhnye Chelny tram	1973			54 km (34 mi)	Tram
Nizhnekamsk	Russia	Nizhnekamsk tram	1967			28.3 km (17.6 mi)	Tram
Nizhny Novgorod	Russia	Trams in Nizhny Novgorod	1896			76.5 km (47.5 mi)	Tram
Nizhny Tagil	Russia	Nizhny Tagil tram	1937			42 km (26 mi)	Tram
Novocherkassk	Russia	Novocherkassk tram	1954			20 km (12 mi)	Tram
Novokuznetsk	Russia	Trams in Novokuznetsk	1933			41.5 km (25.8 mi)	Tram
Novosibirsk	Russia	Trams in Novosibirsk	1934		10	64 km (40 mi)	Tram
Novotroitsk	Russia	Novotroitsk tram	1956			11.3 km (7.0 mi)	Tram
Omsk	Russia	Omsk tram	1936			31.5 km (19.6 mi)	Tram
Orsk	Russia	Orsk tram	1948			35 km (22 mi)	Tram
Oryol	Russia	Oryol tram	1898			17.1 km (10.6 mi)	Tram
Osinniki	Russia	Osinniki tram	1960			11.3 km (7.0 mi)	Tram
Perm	Russia	Perm tram	1929			48.5 km (30.1 mi)	Tram
Prokopyevsk	Russia	Prokopyevsk tram	1936			30 km (19 mi)	Tram
Pyatigorsk	Russia	Pyatigorsk tram	1904			22.5 km (14.0 mi)	Tram
Rostov-on-Don	Russia	Trams in Rostov-on-Don	1902			26 km (16 mi)	Tram
Saint Petersburg	Russia	Trams in Saint Petersburg	1902			231.2 km (143.7 mi)	Tram
Salavat	Russia	Salavat tram	1957			13 km (8.1 mi)	Tram
Samara	Russia	Samara tram	1915			68 km (42 mi)	Tram
Saratov	Russia	Saratov tram	1908			54.7 km (34.0 mi)	Tram
Smolensk	Russia	Smolensk tram	1901			22.6 km (14.0 mi)	Tram
Stary Oskol	Russia	Stary Oskol tram	1981			23.4 km (14.5 mi)	Light rail
Taganrog	Russia	Taganrog tram	1932			22 km (14 mi)	Tram
Tomsk	Russia	Tomsk tram	1949			17.5 km (10.9 mi)	Tram
Tula	Russia	Tula tram	1927			37.3 km (23.2 mi)	Tram
Ufa	Russia	Trams in Ufa	1937			34.5 km (21.4 mi)	Tram
Ulan-Ude	Russia	Ulan-Ude tram	1958			24 km (15 mi)	Tram
Ulyanovsk	Russia	Ulyanovsk tram	1954			55.8 km (34.7 mi)	Tram
Usolye-Sibirskoye	Russia	Trams in Usolye-Sibirskoye	1967			11.8 km (7.3 mi)	Tram
Vladikavkaz	Russia	Vladikavkaz tram	1904			25 km (16 mi)	Tram
Vladivostok	Russia	Trams in Vladivostok	1912		1	5.5 km (3.4 mi)	Tram
Volchansk	Russia	Trams in Volchansk (Note: Purportedly the smallest town (pop. approx. 10,000) in the world with its own stand-alone tram system.)	1951		1	8 km (5.0 mi)	Tram
Volgograd	Russia	Volgograd tram	1913			42.7 km (26.5 mi)	Tram
Volgograd	Russia	Volgograd Metrotram	1984	22		17.3 km (10.7 mi)	Light rail
Volzhsky	Russia	Volzhsky tram	1963			31 km (19 mi)	Tram
Yaroslavl	Russia	Yaroslavl tram	1900			19.5 km (12.1 mi)	Tram
Yekaterinburg	Russia	Yekaterinburg tram	1929			81.9 km (50.9 mi)	Tram
Zlatoust	Russia	Zlatoust tram	1934			22.2 km (13.8 mi)	Tram
Belgrade	Serbia	Trams in Belgrade	1892	135	12	45.3 km (28.1 mi)	Tram
Bratislava	Slovakia	Trams in Bratislava	1895	161	4	45.4 km (28.2 mi)	Tram
Košice	Slovakia	Trams in Košice	1913	48	16	33.7 km (20.9 mi)	Tram
Trenčianske Teplice	Slovakia	Trams in Trenčianske Teplice	1909	7	1	5.9 km (3.7 mi)	Heritage interurban
Alicante	Spain	Alicante Tram	1999	52	6	98 km (61 mi)	Tram/Tram-train
Barcelona	Spain	Trams in Barcelona	1901	61	7	29.2 km (18.1 mi)	Tram/Heritage tram
Bilbao (Note: This system is operated under the common brand "Euskotren Tranbia", which groups tramways in the cities of Bilbao and Vitoria-Gasteiz, by the public controlled railway company Euskotren. Euskotren transport network is composed by transit systems of the whole Basque Country.)	Spain	Bilbao tram	2002	14	1	4.9 km (3.0 mi)	Tram
Cádiz	Spain	Cádiz Bay tram-train	2022	21	1	24 km (15 mi)	Tram/Tram-train
Granada	Spain	Granada Metro	2017	26	1	15.9 km (9.9 mi)	Light rail
Madrid	Spain	Metro Ligero	2007	36	3	27.8 km (17.3 mi)	Light rail
Málaga	Spain	Málaga Metro	2007	19	2	13.6 km (8.5 mi)	Light rail
Murcia	Spain	Murcia tram	2011 (Note: A two-year free trial service started in 2007 on an "experimental section" (2.2 km – 4 stops).)	28	2	18 km (11 mi)	Tram
Parla	Spain	Parla Tram	2007	15	1	8.3 km (5.2 mi)	Tram
Santa Cruz de Tenerife	Spain	Tenerife Tram	2007	27	2	15.1 km (9.4 mi)	Tram
Seville	Spain	MetroCentro	2007	7	1	2.2 km (1.4 mi)	Tram
Sóller	Spain	Tranvía de Sóller	1913	17	1	5 km (3.1 mi)	Heritage tram
Valencia	Spain	Metrovalencia	1994	147	10	164 km (102 mi)	Tram/Light rail
Vitoria-Gasteiz	Spain	Vitoria-Gasteiz tram	2008	23	2	13.5 km (8.4 mi)	Tram
Zaragoza	Spain	Zaragoza tram	2011	11	1	12.8 km (8.0 mi)	Tram
Gothenburg	Sweden	Gothenburg Tramway	1879	133	12	81.2 km (50.5 mi)	Tram
Lund	Sweden	Lund tramway	2020	9	1	5.5 km (3.4 mi)	Tram
Malmköping	Sweden	Malmköping Museum Tramway	1969	9	1	2.6 km (1.6 mi)	Heritage tram
Malmö	Sweden	Malmö Museum Tramway	1987	9	1	2 km (1.2 mi)	Heritage tram
Norrköping	Sweden	Trams in Norrköping	1904	47	2	18.7 km (11.6 mi)	Tram
Stockholm	Sweden	Trams in Stockholm	1901	59, (Note: Stations for the tram line(s) only.) 10 (Note: Stations for the heritage tramway line(s) only.)	5	40.1 km (24.9 mi) (Note: Total length for both tram and heritage tramway portions combined.)	Light rail/Tram/Heritage tram
Basel	Switzerland	Trams in Basel (Note: A small portion of Basel's tram network serves stops within France or Germany.)	1895		12	86.3 km (53.6 mi)	Tram
Bern	Switzerland	Trams in Bern	1890	71	5	27.5 km (17.1 mi)	Tram
Geneva	Switzerland	Trams in Geneva	1862	76	5	38.1 km (23.7 mi)	Tram
Lausanne	Switzerland	Lausanne light rail (Note: The Lausanne Metro has two lines: Line M1 is light rail; Line M2 is a rapid transit/metro system. Statistics shown are for the M1 line only.) (Note: See Trams in Lausanne for former Lausanne tram network.)	1991	15	1	7.8 km (4.8 mi)	Light rail
Neuchâtel	Switzerland	Trams in Neuchâtel	1892	12	1	8.85 km (5.50 mi)	Tram
Zurich	Switzerland	Trams in Zurich (Glattalbahn, Limmattalbahn)	1882		16	76 km (47 mi)	Tram/Light rail
Istanbul	Turkey	see Asian section, above.					
Dnipro	Ukraine	Trams in Dnipro	1897		14	82 km (51 mi)	Tram
Donetsk	Ukraine	Trams in Donetsk	1928		10	126.25 km (78.45 mi)	Tram
Druzhkivka	Ukraine	Druzhkivskyi tram	1945			13 km (8.1 mi)	Tram
Horlivka	Ukraine	Horlivka tram	1933			28.5 km (17.7 mi)	Tram
Kamianske	Ukraine	Kamyansky tram	1935	4		77.6 km (48.2 mi)	Tram
Kharkiv	Ukraine	Trams in Kharkiv	1906			95 km (59 mi)	Tram
Konotop	Ukraine	Konotop tram	1949			17 km (11 mi)	Tram
Kryvyi Rih	Ukraine	Kryvyi Rih Metrotram	1986	4		18 km (11 mi)	Light rail
Kryvyi Rih	Ukraine	Trams in Kryvyi Rih	1935	17	13	131 km (81 mi)	Tram
Kyiv	Ukraine	Trams in Kyiv	1892		21	98 km (61 mi)	Tram
Lviv	Ukraine	Trams in Lviv	1894	100		36.5 km (22.7 mi)	Tram
Mariupol	Ukraine	Trams in Mariupol	1933			47.2 km (29.3 mi)	Tram
Mykolaiv	Ukraine	Trams in Mykolaiv	1915	88	6	72.83 km (45.25 mi)	Tram
Odesa	Ukraine	Trams in Odesa	1910			98 km (61 mi)	Tram
Vinnytsia	Ukraine	Trams in Vinnytsia	1913		6	19.5 km (12.1 mi)	Tram
Yenakiieve	Ukraine	Trams in Yenakiieve	1932			14.5 km (9.0 mi)	Tram
Yevpatoria	Ukraine	Trams in Yevpatoria	1914			15.5 km (9.6 mi)	Tram
Zaporizhzhia	Ukraine	Zaporizhzhia Tram	1932		7	45 km (28 mi)	Tram
Zhytomyr	Ukraine	Zhytomyr tram	1899		1	7 km (4.3 mi)	Tram
Birmingham	United Kingdom	West Midlands Metro	1999	33	1	21.5 km (13.4 mi)	Tram/Light rail
Blackpool	United Kingdom	Blackpool Tramway	1885	29	1	17.7 km (11.0 mi)	Tram/Heritage tram
Edinburgh	United Kingdom	Edinburgh Trams	2014	23	1	14 km (8.7 mi)	Tram
London	United Kingdom	Tramlink	2000	39	3	28 km (17 mi)	Tram/Light rail
Manchester	United Kingdom	Manchester Metrolink	1992	99	8	101 km (63 mi)	Tram/Light rail
Newcastle upon Tyne	United Kingdom	Tyne and Wear Metro	1980	60	2	77.5 km (48.2 mi)	Light rail
Nottingham	United Kingdom	Nottingham Express Transit	2004	51	2	32 km (20 mi)	Tram/Light rail
Seaton	United Kingdom	Seaton Tramway	1970	6	1	4.8 km (3.0 mi)	Heritage tram
Sheffield	United Kingdom	South Yorkshire Supertram	1994	50	4	34.6 km (21.5 mi)	Tram/Tram-train
Wirral	United Kingdom	Wirral Tramway	1995	6	1	0.7 km (0.43 mi)	Heritage tram

=== See also ===
- List of town tramway systems in Austria
- List of town tramway systems in Belarus
- List of town tramway systems in Belgium
- List of town tramway systems in Croatia
- List of town tramway systems in the Czech Republic
- List of town tramway systems in Denmark
- List of town tramway systems in Finland
- List of town tramway systems in France/Trams in France
- List of town tramway systems in Germany/Trams in Germany
- List of town tramway systems in Greece
- List of town tramway systems in Hungary
- List of town tramway systems in the Republic of Ireland
- List of town tramway systems in Italy
- List of town tramway systems in the Netherlands
- List of town tramway systems in Norway
- Malta Tramways
- List of town tramway systems in Poland
- List of town tramway systems in Portugal/Trams in Portugal
- List of town tramway systems in Romania
- List of town tramway systems in Russia
- List of town tramway systems in Serbia
- List of town tramway systems in Spain/Trams in Spain
- List of town tramway systems in Sweden
- List of town tramway systems in Switzerland
- List of town tramway systems in Ukraine
- List of town tramway systems in the United Kingdom

== North America ==
The following systems provide regular transit service daily and year-round in North America, including those systems or lines using vintage or faux-vintage streetcars. For other heritage streetcar lines, ones with more limited service, see Streetcars in North America. North America, specifically more so the United States, once had extensive tram networks in almost all cities, but nearly all were removed for bus operations between the 1940s and the 1960s. These systems are listed at List of streetcar systems in the United States.

Location	Country	System	Year opened	Stations	Lines	System length	Type
Calgary	Canada	CTrain	1981	45	2	59.9 km (37.2 mi)	Light rail
Edmonton	Canada	Edmonton LRT	1978	29	3	37.4 km (23.2 mi)	Light rail
Kitchener, Waterloo	Canada	ION Light Rail	2019	19	1	19 km (12 mi)	Light rail
Ottawa	Canada	O-Train	2019	25	3	35.5 km (22.1 mi)	Light rail/Diesel light rail
Toronto	Canada	Toronto streetcar system	1861	685	10	83 km (52 mi)	Streetcar
Toronto	Canada	Toronto subway: lines 5 Eglinton and 6 Finch West	2025	43	2	29.3 km (18.2 mi)	Light rail
Guadalajara	Mexico	Sistema de Tren Eléctrico Urbano	1989	55	4	68.8 km (42.8 mi)	Light rail
Mexico City	Mexico	Mexico City Light Rail	1986	18	1	12.8 km (8.0 mi)	Light rail
Atlanta	United States	Atlanta Streetcar	2014	12	1	4.3 km (2.7 mi)	Streetcar
Baltimore	United States	Baltimore Light RailLink	1992	33	3	48.3 km (30.0 mi)	Light rail
Boston	United States	MBTA Green Line (Note: While the MBTA Green Line is light rail, the MBTA Blue, Orange, and Red lines of the system are rapid transit/subways.)	1897	70	4	43.0 km (26.7 mi)	Light rail
Boston	United States	Mattapan Line	1929	8	1	4.1 km (2.5 mi)	Heritage light rail
Buffalo	United States	Buffalo Metro Rail	1984	14	1	11 km (6.8 mi)	Light rail
Camden, Trenton	United States	River Line (NJ Transit)	2004	21	1	55 km (34 mi)	Diesel light rail/Tram-train
Charlotte	United States	Lynx Blue Line	2007	26	1	31.1 km (19.3 mi)	Light rail
Charlotte	United States	CityLynx Gold Line	2015	17	1	6.4 km (4.0 mi)	Streetcar
Cincinnati	United States	Connector	2016	18	1	5.8 km (3.6 mi)	Streetcar
Cleveland	United States	Blue Line, Green Line, and Waterfront Line (RTA Rapid Transit) (Note: While the Blue, Green, and Waterfront lines are light rail, Cleveland's other rail transit line, the Red Line, is rapid transit.)	1913	29	3	29 km (18 mi)	Light rail
Dallas	United States	DART rail	1996	73	5	192 km (119 mi)	Light rail/Diesel light rail
Dallas	United States	Dallas Streetcar	2015	6	1	3.9 km (2.4 mi)	Streetcar
Dallas	United States	M-Line Trolley	1989	38	1	7.4 km (4.6 mi)	Heritage streetcar
Denver	United States	RTD Light Rail: D, E, H, L, R, W	1994	57	6	96.7 km (60.1 mi)	Light rail
Detroit	United States	QLine	2017	12	1	5.3 km (3.3 mi)	Streetcar
El Paso	United States	El Paso Streetcar	2018	27	2	7.7 km (4.8 mi)	Heritage streetcar
Houston	United States	METRORail	2004	39	3	36.5 km (22.7 mi)	Light rail
Hudson County	United States	Hudson–Bergen Light Rail (NJ Transit)	2000	24	3	26.4 km (16.4 mi)	Light rail
Kansas City	United States	KC Streetcar	2016	19	1	10.3 km (6.4 mi)	Streetcar
Little Rock	United States	Metro Streetcar	2004	15	2	5.5 km (3.4 mi)	Heritage streetcar
Los Angeles	United States	Los Angeles Metro Rail (Note: The light rail portion of L.A. Metro consists of A, C, E, and K lines only. The B and D lines of L.A. Metro are rapid transit/subway lines.)	1990	93	4	169.3 km (105.2 mi)	Light rail
Milwaukee	United States	The Hop	2018	10	2	4.0 km (2.5 mi)	Streetcar
Minneapolis–Saint Paul	United States	Metro	2004	37	2	34 km (21 mi)	Light rail
New Orleans	United States	Streetcars in New Orleans	1835	112	5	25.6 km (15.9 mi)	Heritage streetcar
Newark	United States	Newark Light Rail (NJ Transit)	1935	17	2	10.0 km (6.2 mi)	Light rail
Norfolk	United States	The Tide	2011	11	1	11.9 km (7.4 mi)	Light rail
Oceanside	United States	Sprinter	2008	15	1	35 km (22 mi)	Diesel light rail
Oklahoma City	United States	Oklahoma City Streetcar	2018	22	2	7.7 km (4.8 mi)	Streetcar
Philadelphia	United States	T, G, and D (SEPTA Metro) (Note: The light rail portion of SEPTA Metro consists of the T, G, and D only. The L, B, and M are rapid transit lines.)	1906	305	3	96.4 km (59.9 mi)	Light rail/Streetcar/Heritage streetcar
Phoenix	United States	Valley Metro Rail	2008	50	2	62.0 km (38.5 mi)	Light rail
Phoenix	United States	S Line	2022	14	1	4.8 km (3.0 mi)	Streetcar
Pittsburgh	United States	Pittsburgh Light Rail	1984	53	3	42.2 km (26.2 mi)	Light rail
Portland	United States	MAX Light Rail	1986	94	5	96.1 km (59.7 mi)	Light rail
Portland	United States	Portland Streetcar	2001	67	3	11.6 km (7.2 mi)	Streetcar
Sacramento	United States	SacRT light rail	1987	54	3	69.0 km (42.9 mi)	Light rail
St. Louis	United States	MetroLink	1993	38	2	74 km (46 mi)	Light rail
Salt Lake City	United States	TRAX	1999	51	3	72.1 km (44.8 mi)	Light rail
Salt Lake City	United States	S Line	2013	7	1	3.2 km (2.0 mi)	Streetcar
San Diego	United States	San Diego Trolley	1981	62	3	105 km (65 mi)	Light rail
San Francisco (Note: The San Francisco Bay Area is also served by the rapid transit BART system.)	United States	Muni Metro	1980 (Note: Rebuilt as light rail from the streetcar system that originated in 1860; opened 1980–1982.)	117	7	62.6 km (38.9 mi)	Light rail/Streetcar hybrid
San Francisco	United States	F Market & Wharves and E Embarcadero lines	1995	36	2	12.2 km (7.6 mi)	Heritage streetcar
San Francisco	United States	San Francisco cable car system	1878	62	3	6.8 km (4.2 mi)	Heritage cable car
San Jose	United States	VTA light rail	1987	60	3	67.9 km (42.2 mi)	Light rail
Seattle	United States	Link light rail	2009	39	2	94.9 km (59.0 mi)	Light rail
Seattle	United States	Seattle Streetcar	2007	17	2	6.1 km (3.8 mi)	Streetcar
Tacoma	United States	T Line	2003	12	1	6.4 km (4.0 mi)	Light rail
Tampa	United States	TECO Line Streetcar	2002	11	1	4.4 km (2.7 mi)	Heritage streetcar
Tucson	United States	Sun Link	2014	21	1	6.3 km (3.9 mi)	Streetcar

=== See also ===
- Urban rail transit in Canada
- Light rail in the United States
- List of rail transit systems in the United States
- List of street railways in Canada
- List of street railways in Mexico
- List of streetcar systems in the United States
- List of town tramway systems in Central America
- List of town tramway systems in North America
- List of United States light rail systems

== Oceania ==
Location	Country	System	Year opened	Stations	Lines	System length	Annual ridership (millions)	Type
Adelaide	Australia	Glenelg tram line	1873	33	2	16.25 km (10.10 mi)	9.0 (2024–25)	Tram/Light rail
Canberra	Australia	Light rail in Canberra	2019	14	1	12 km (7.5 mi)	3.65 (2022)	Light rail
Gold Coast	Australia	G:link	2014	27	1	27 km (17 mi)	10.74 (2018–19)	Light rail
Melbourne	Australia	Trams in Melbourne (see also: Yarra Trams)	1884	1763	24	245 km (152 mi)	154.8 (2023–24)	Tram/Light rail
Newcastle	Australia	Newcastle Light Rail	2019	6	1	2.7 km (1.7 mi)	0.76 (2023)	Light rail
Sydney	Australia	Parramatta Light Rail	2024 (Note: Although located within the same city as the Sydney Light Rail network, the Parramatta Light Rail network is physically separated and does not connect with the Sydney Light Rail network. Officially considered separate network/system by Transport for NSW and not part of the Sydney Light Rail network.)	16	1	12 km (7.5 mi)	3.7 (2025)	Light rail
Sydney	Australia	Light rail in Sydney	1997 (Note: Previous system (Trams in Sydney) operated of 1879 until 1961.)	42	3	24.7 km (15.3 mi)	40.6 (2023–24)	Light rail

== South America ==
Location	Country	System	Year opened	Stations	Lines	System length	Type
Buenos Aires	Argentina	Premetro	1987	17	1	7.4 km (4.6 mi)	Light rail
Buenos Aires	Argentina	Tren de la Costa	1995	11	1	15.5 km (9.6 mi)	Light rail
Buenos Aires	Argentina	Historic Tramway of Buenos Aires	1980	2	1	2 km (1.2 mi)	Heritage tram
Mendoza	Argentina	Metrotranvía Mendoza	2012	26	1	17 km (11 mi)	Tram/Light rail
Oranjestad	Aruba	Trams in Oranjestad	2012	10	1	1.9 km (1.2 mi)	Heritage tram
Cochabamba	Bolivia	Mi Tren	2022	41	3	40.7 km (25.3 mi)	Light rail/Interurban
Rio de Janeiro	Brazil	Santa Teresa Tram	1877	4	1	6.0 km (3.7 mi)	Heritage tram
Rio de Janeiro	Brazil	Rio de Janeiro Light Rail	2016	28	3	28 km (17 mi)	Light rail/Tram
Santos and the Metropolitan Region of Baixada Santista	Brazil	Baixada Santista Light Rail	2016	29	2	19.5 km (12.1 mi)	Light rail
Medellín	Colombia	Ayacucho Tram (Note: See Trams in Medellin for former Medellin tram network.)	2015	9	1	4.3 km (2.7 mi)	Translohr
Cuenca	Ecuador	Cuenca Tramway	2020	27	1	10.7 km (6.6 mi)	Tram

=== See also ===
- List of Latin American rail transit systems by ridership
- List of town tramway systems in Argentina
- List of town tramway systems in Brazil
- List of town tramway systems in Chile

== Gallery ==
Maps of tram and light rail transit systems

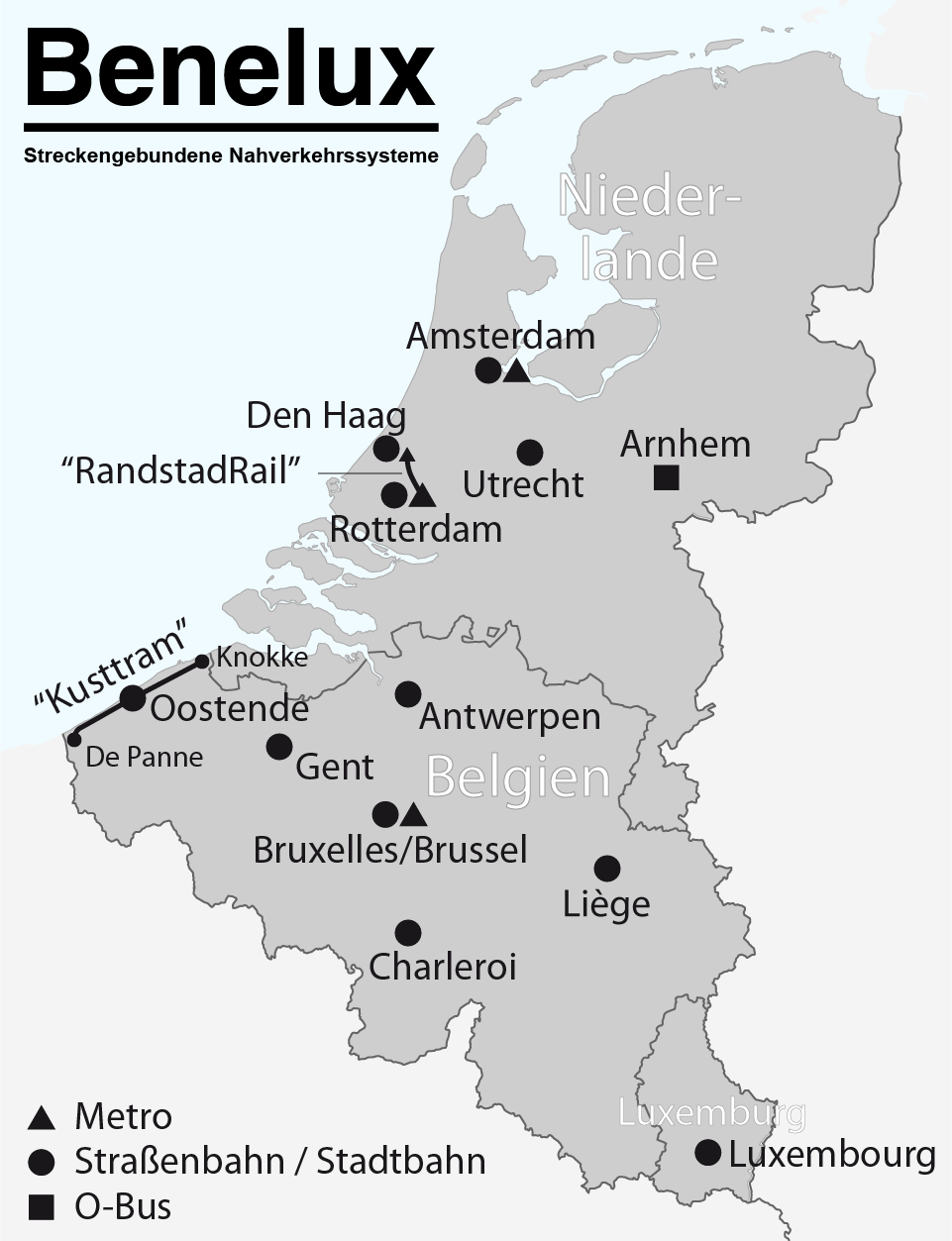
Benelux (2018)

China & Taiwan (2019)

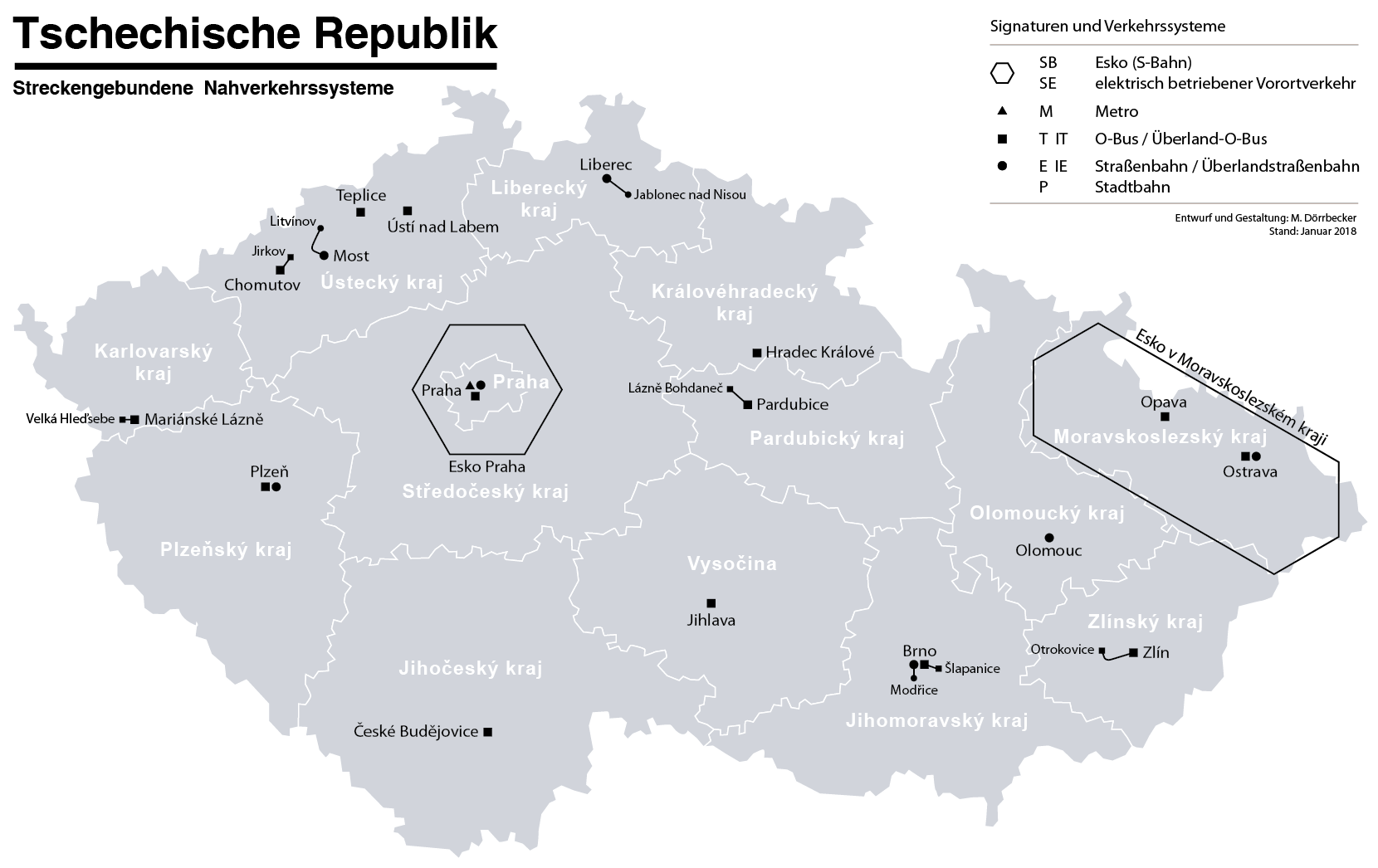
Czech Republic (2018)

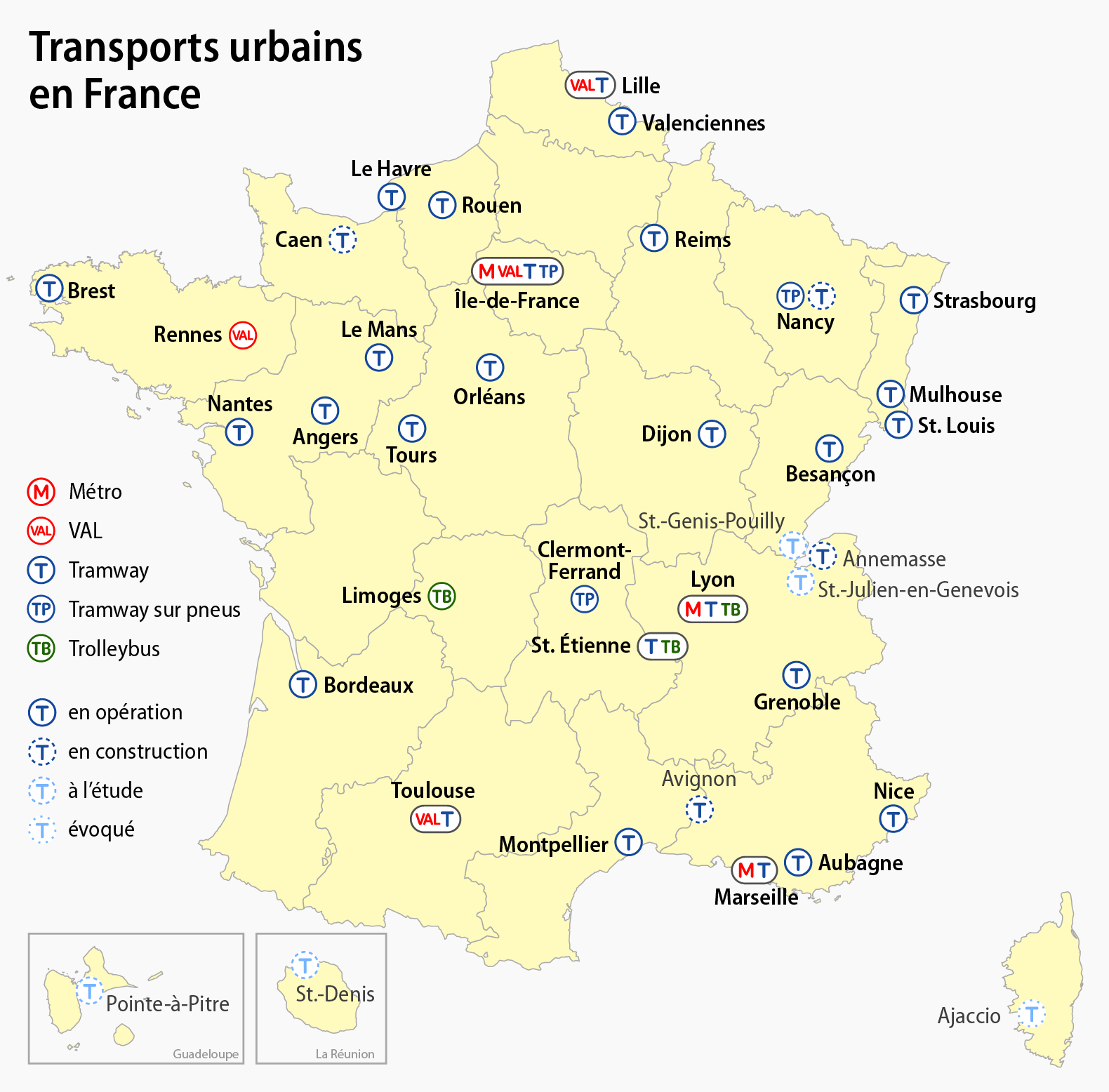
France (2019)

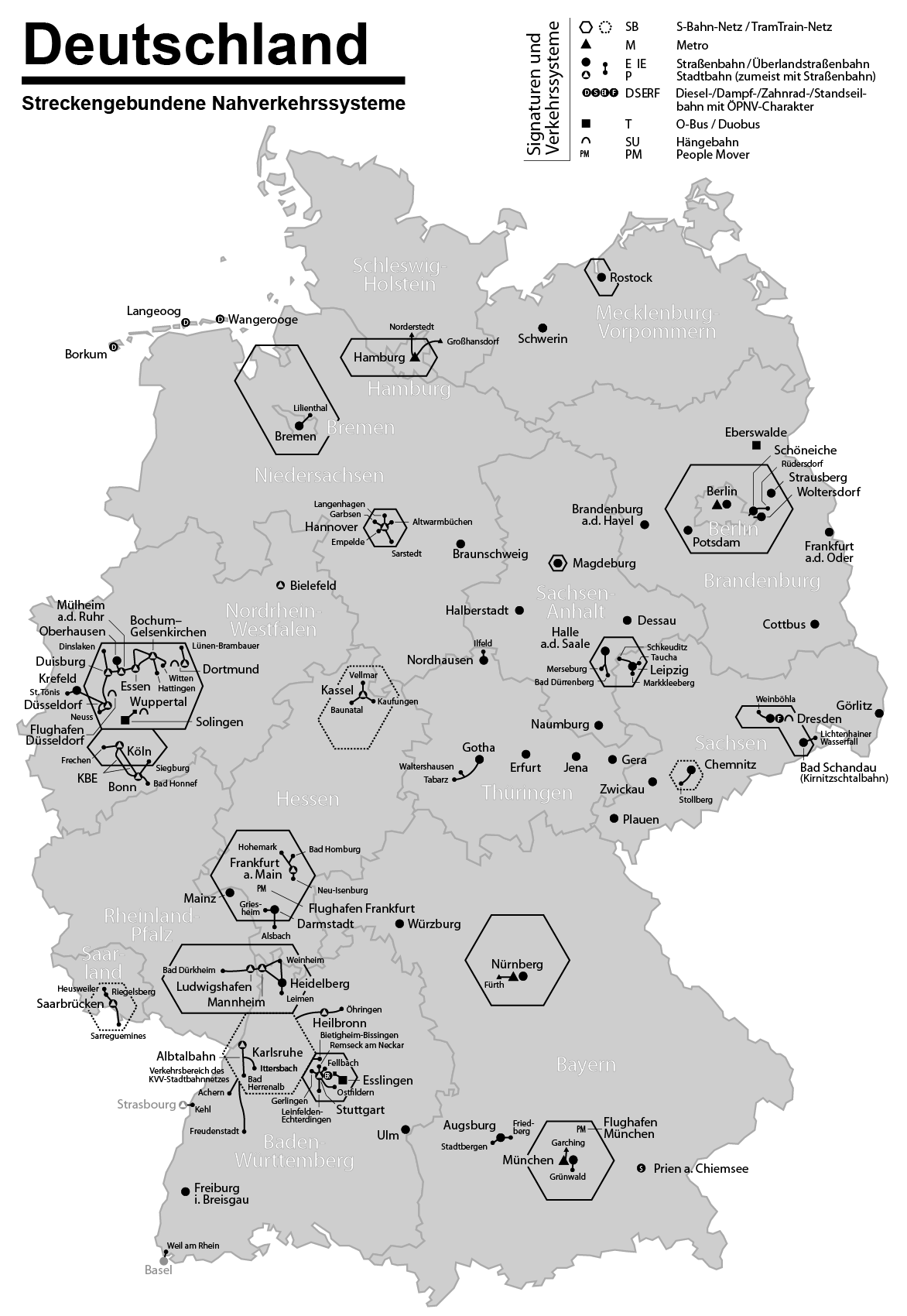
Germany (2018)

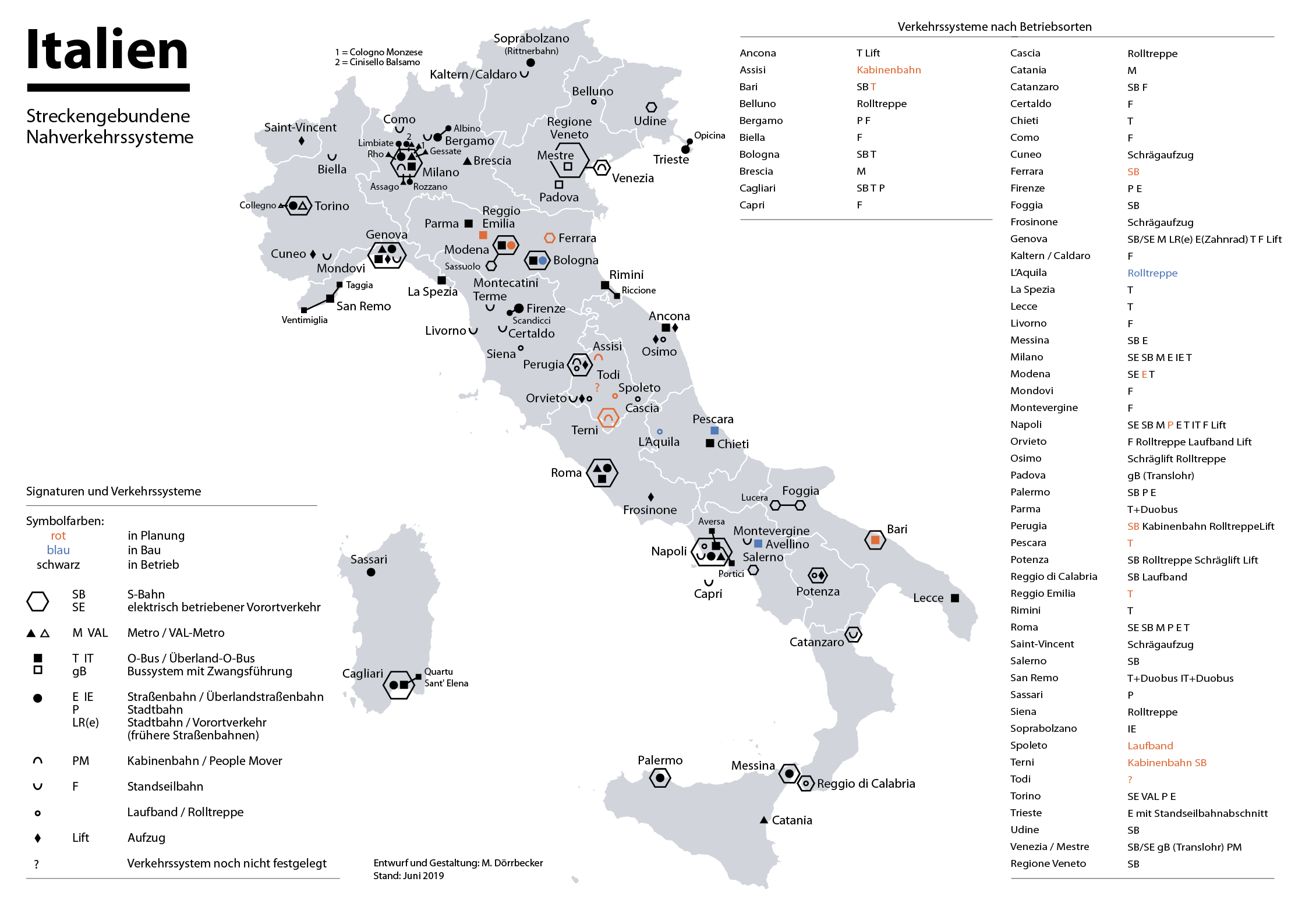
Italy (2019)

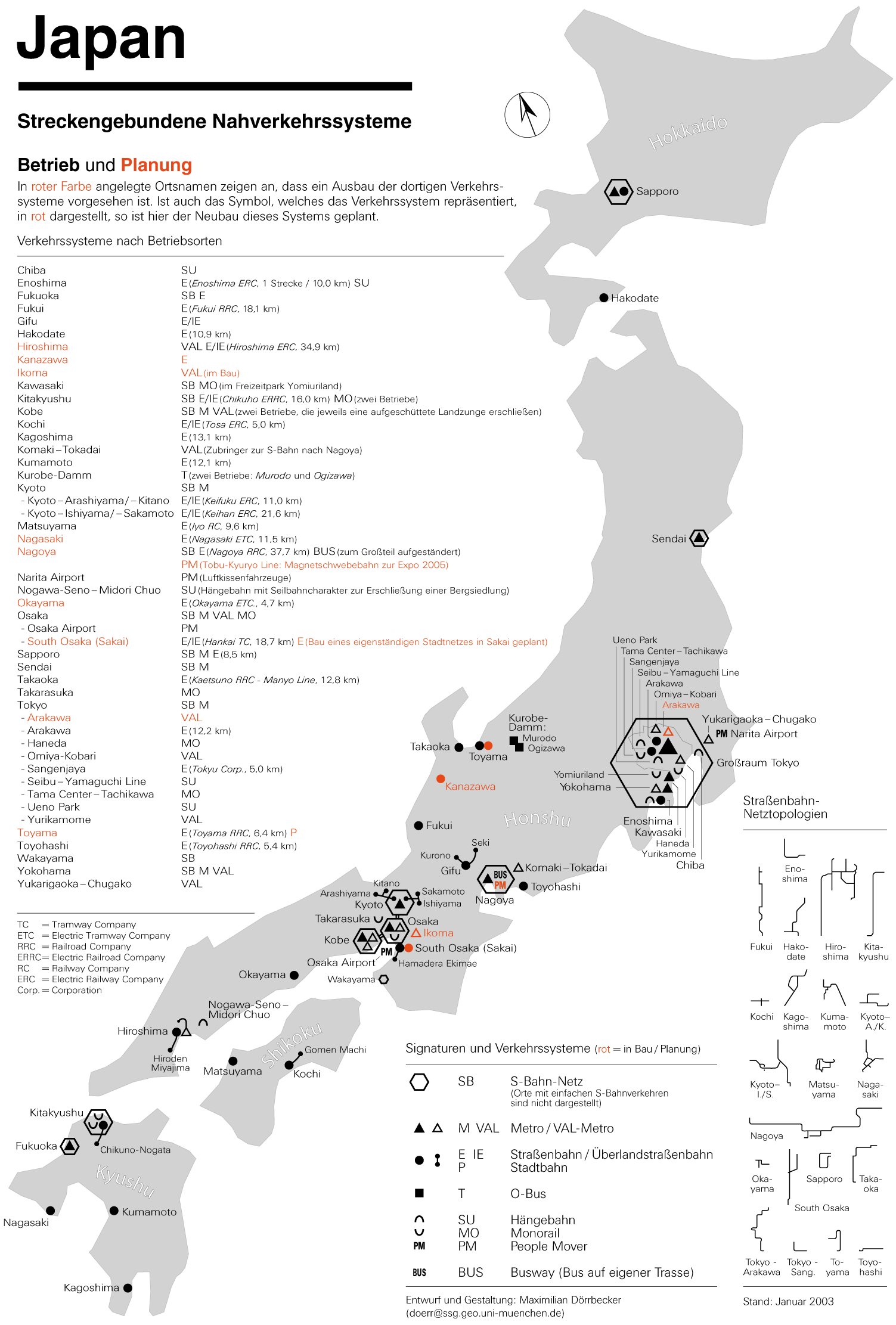
Japan (2005)

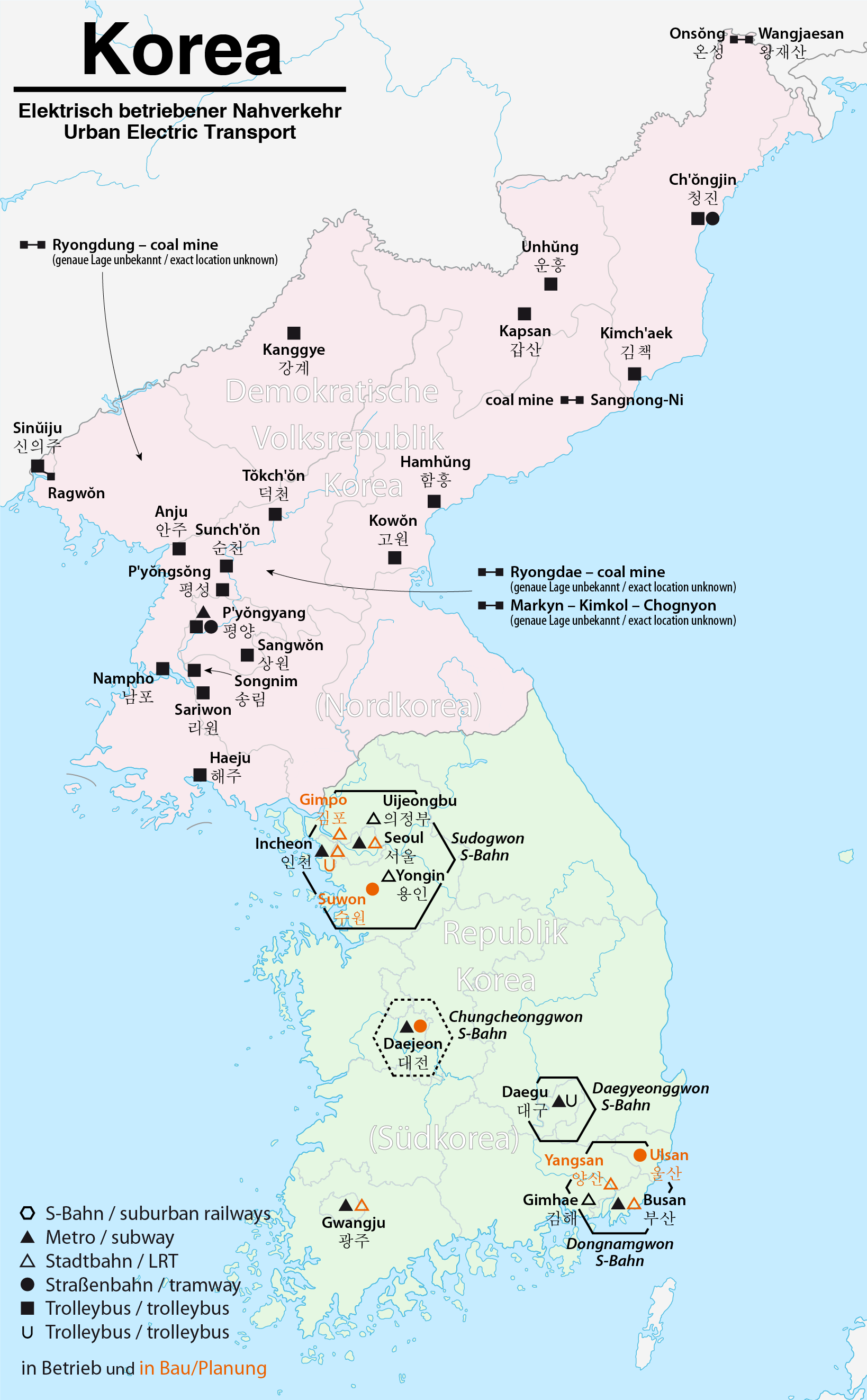
Korea (2018)

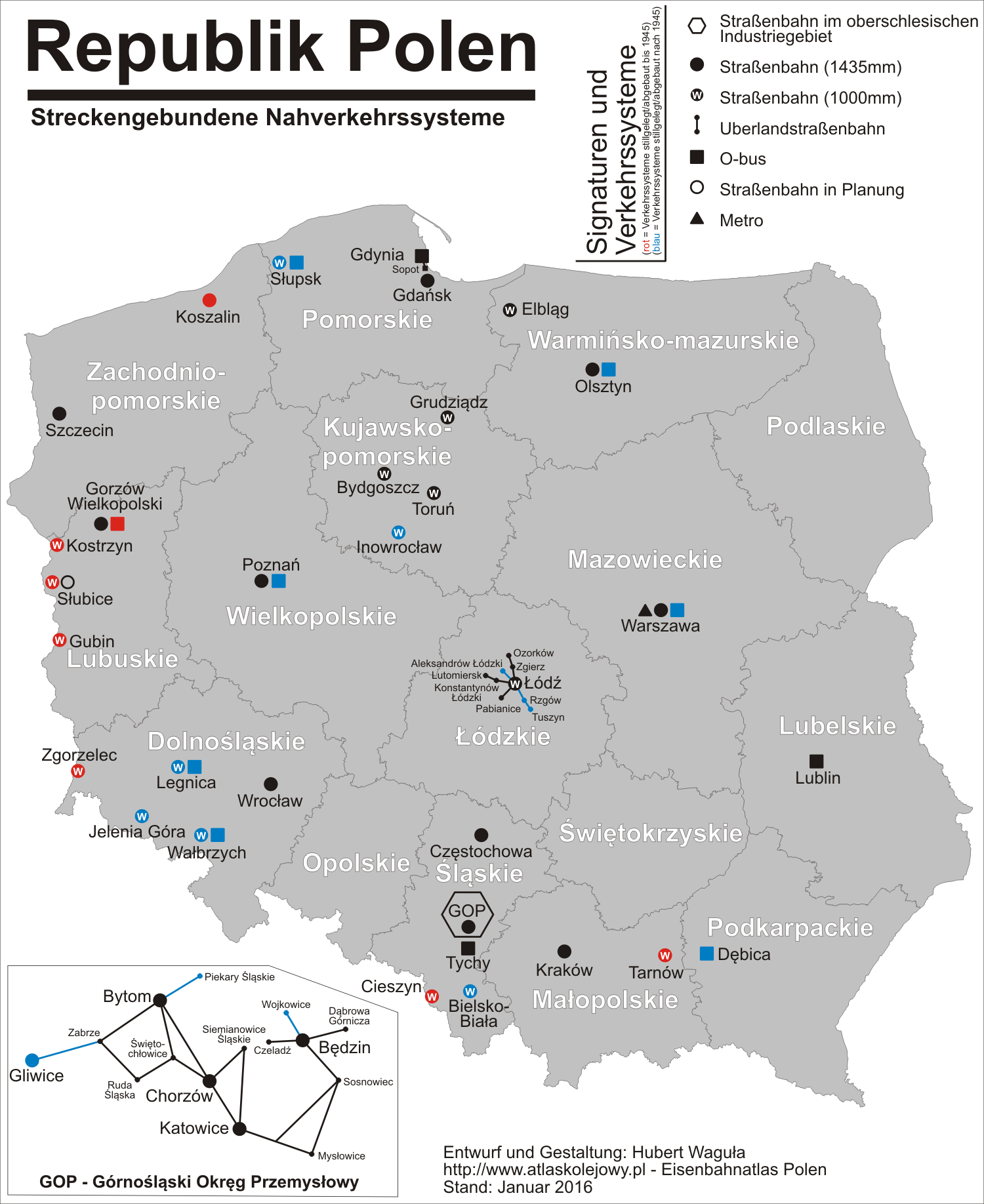
Poland (2015)

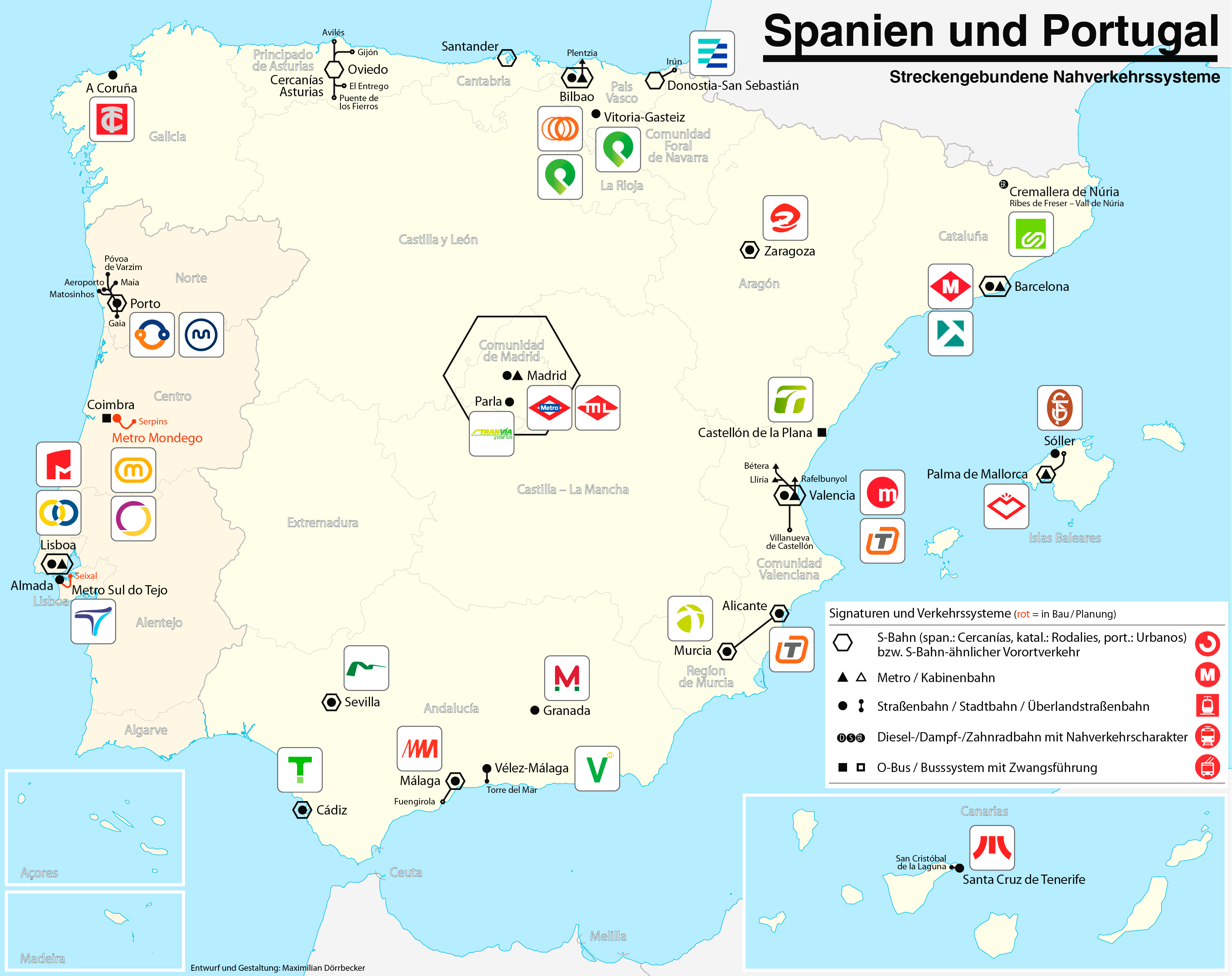
Spain & Portugal (2018)

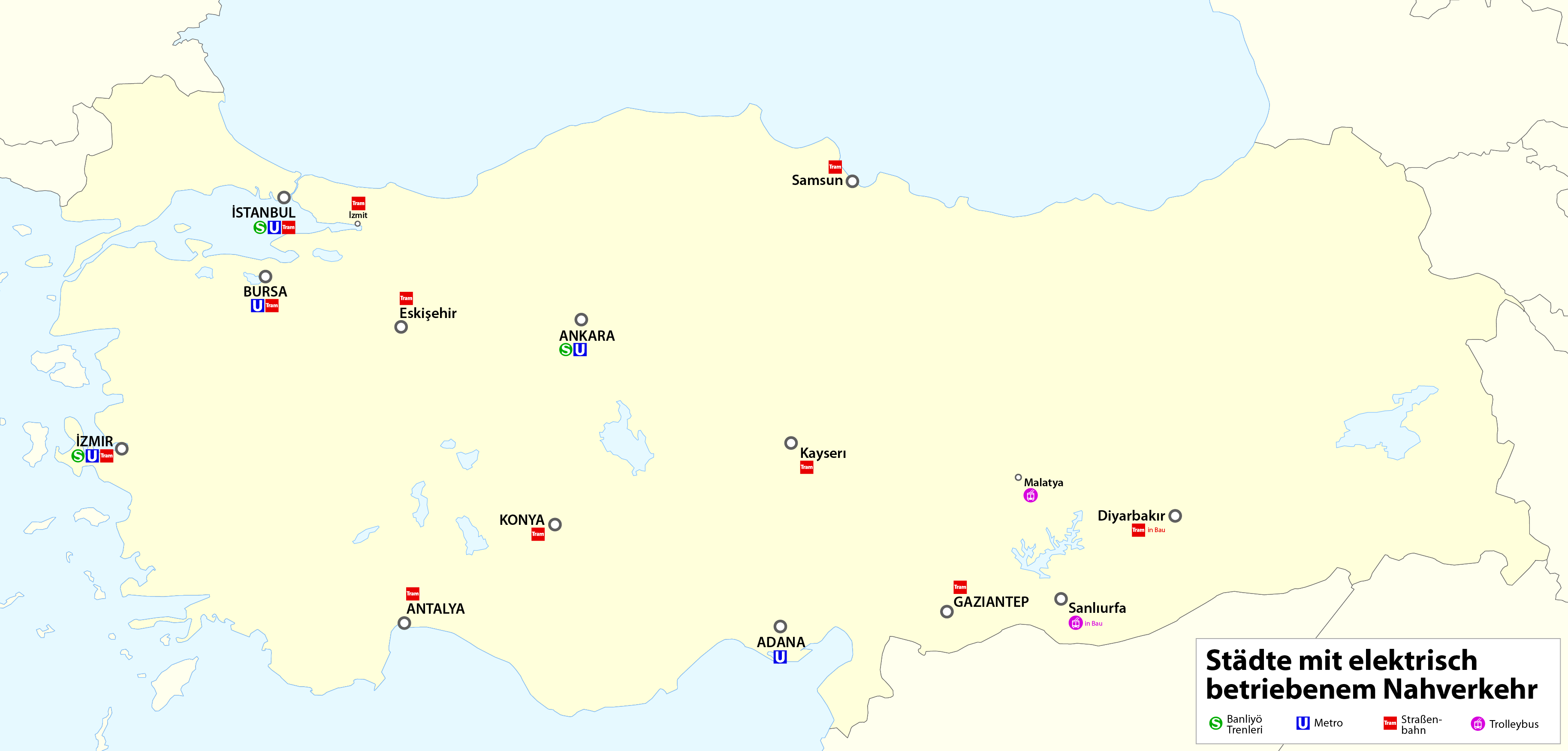
Turkey (2017)

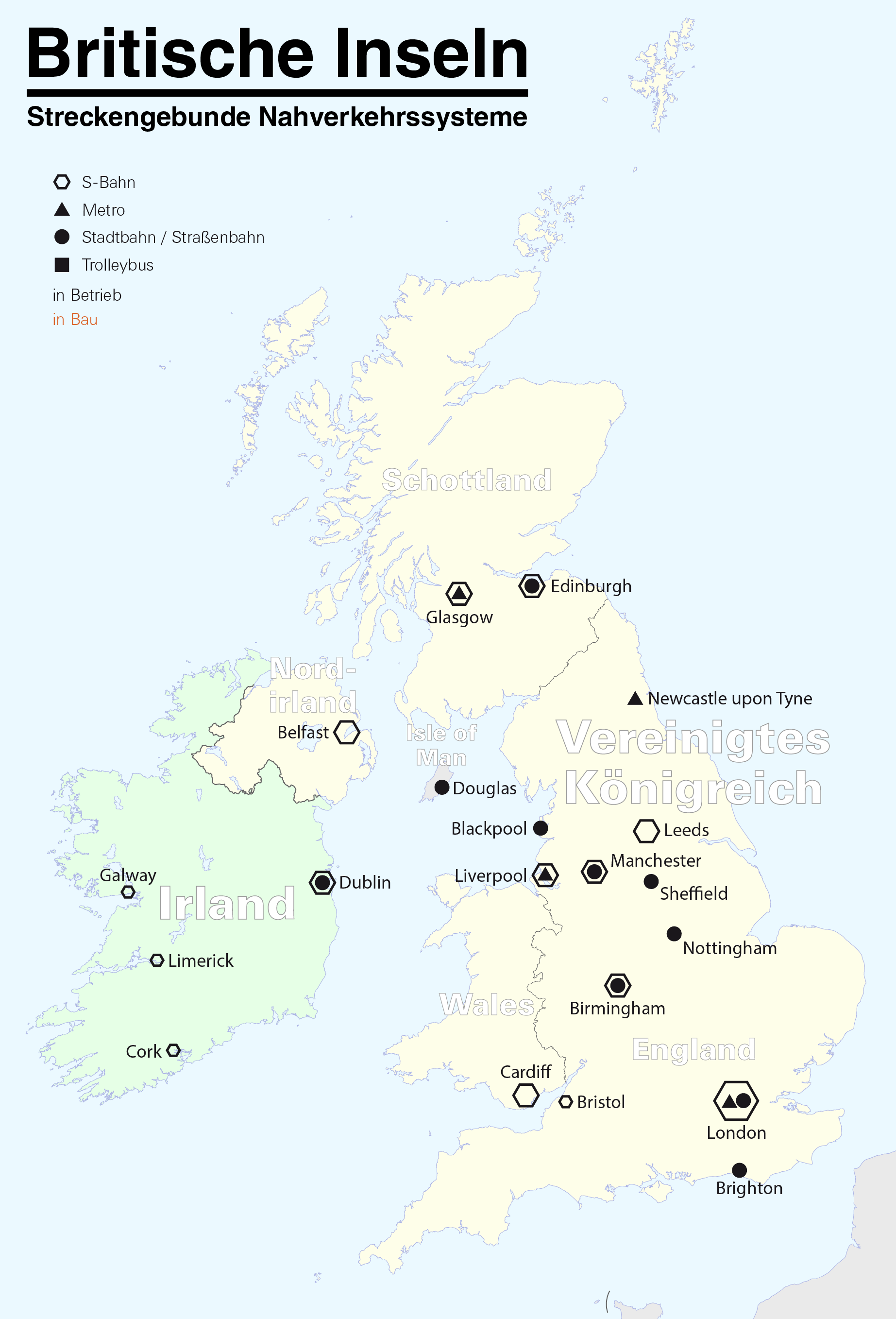
United Kingdom & Republic of Ireland (2015)

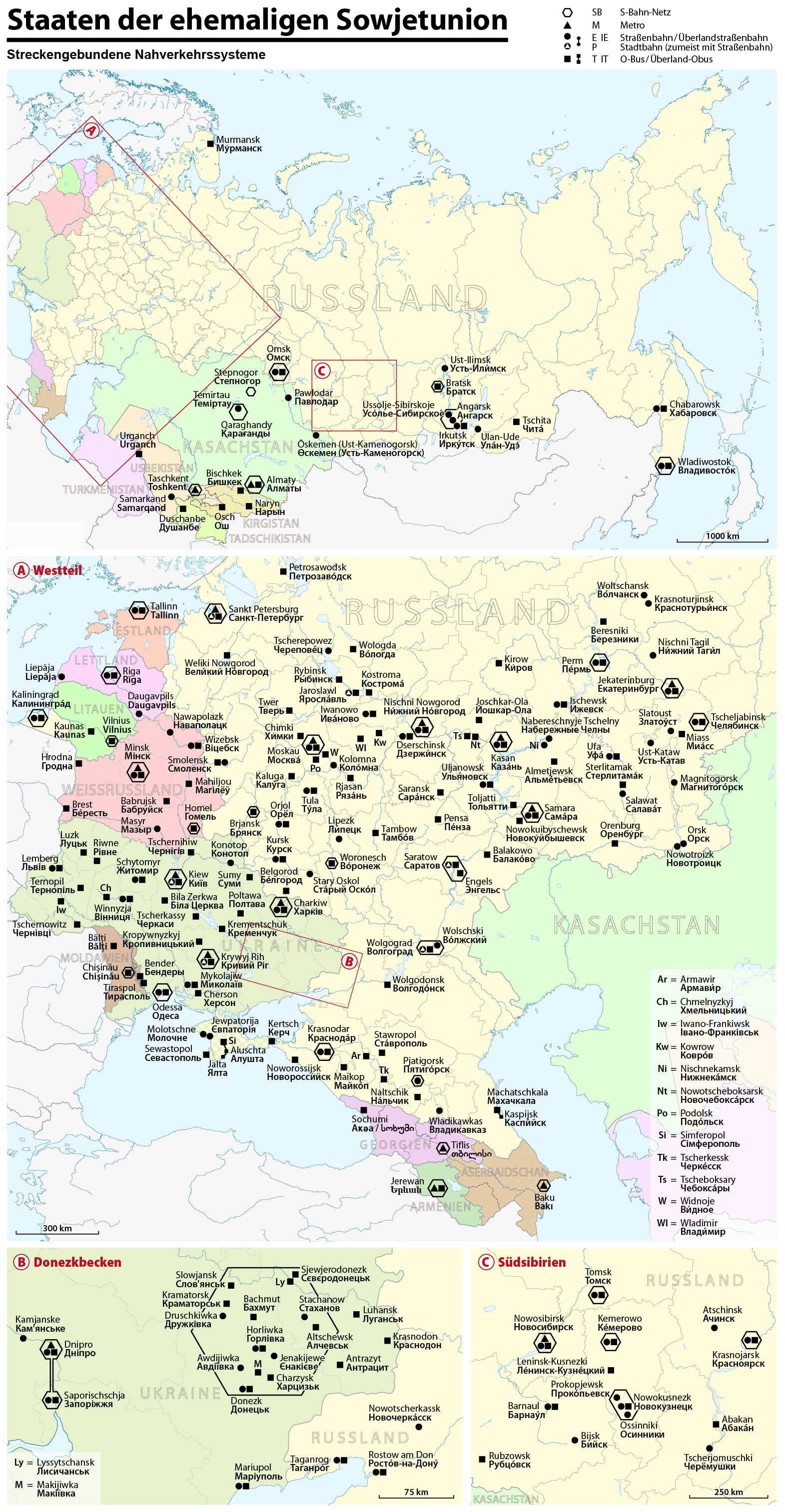
Former Soviet countries (2019)

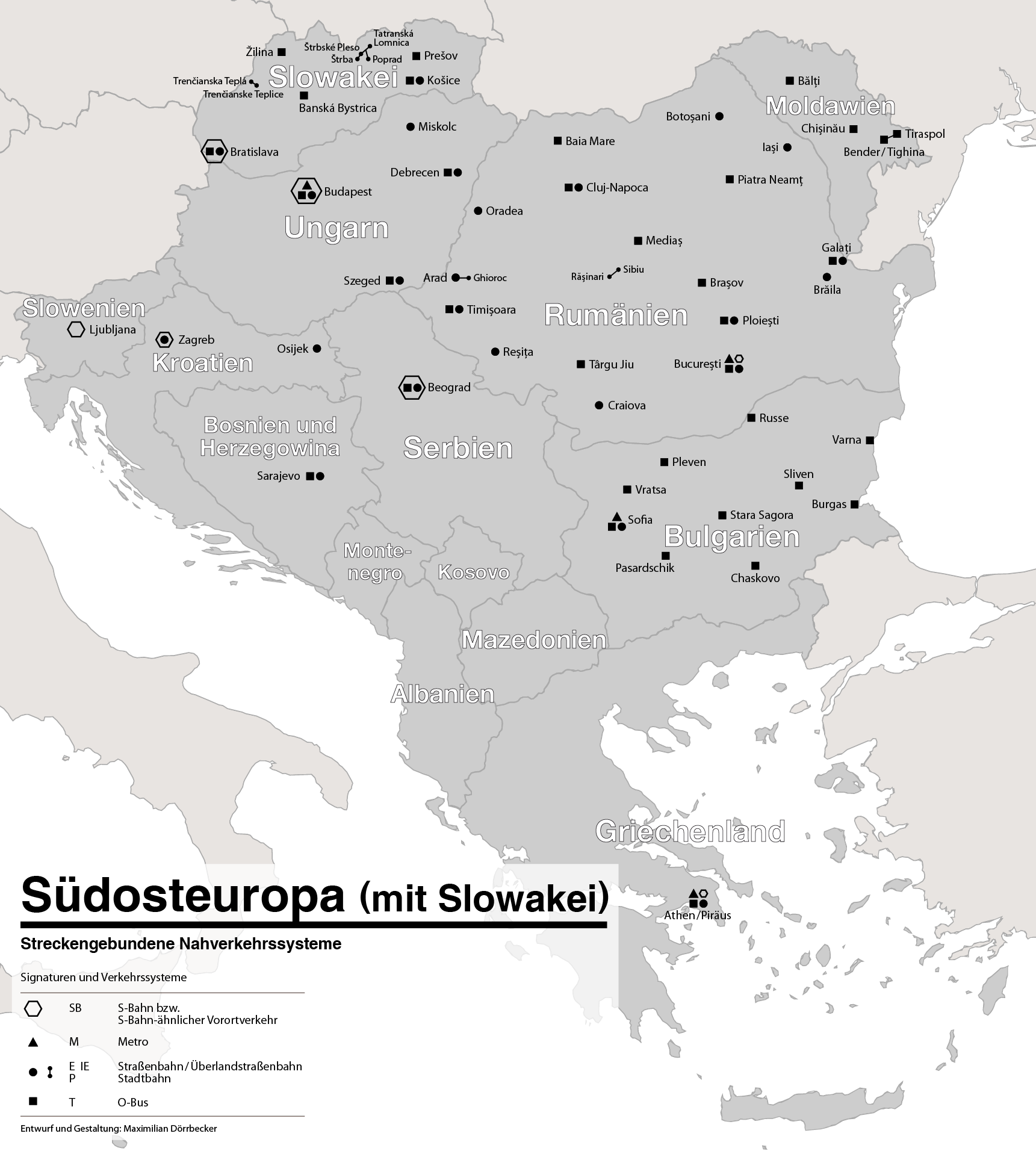
Southeast Europe & Slovakia (2019)

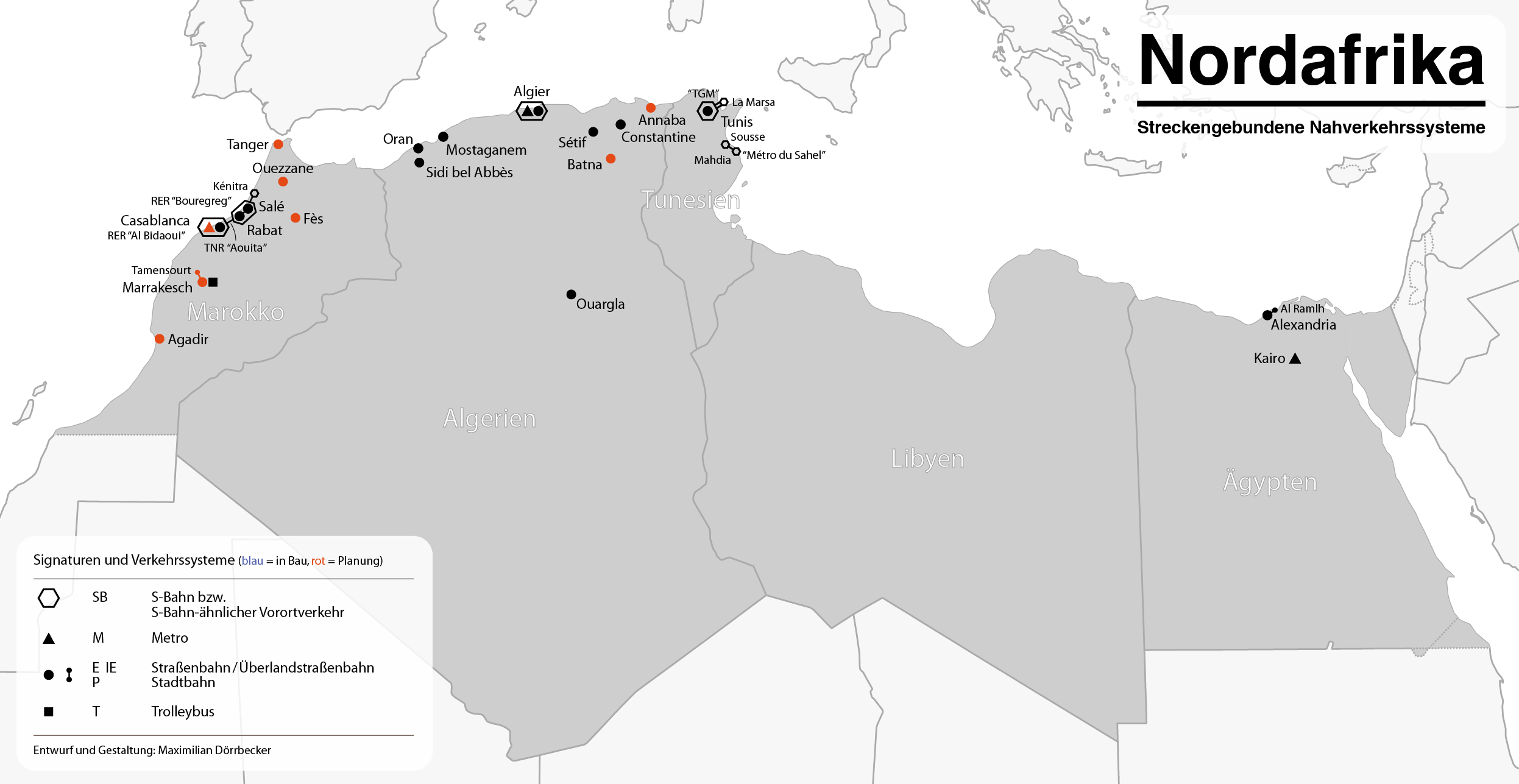
North Africa (2019)

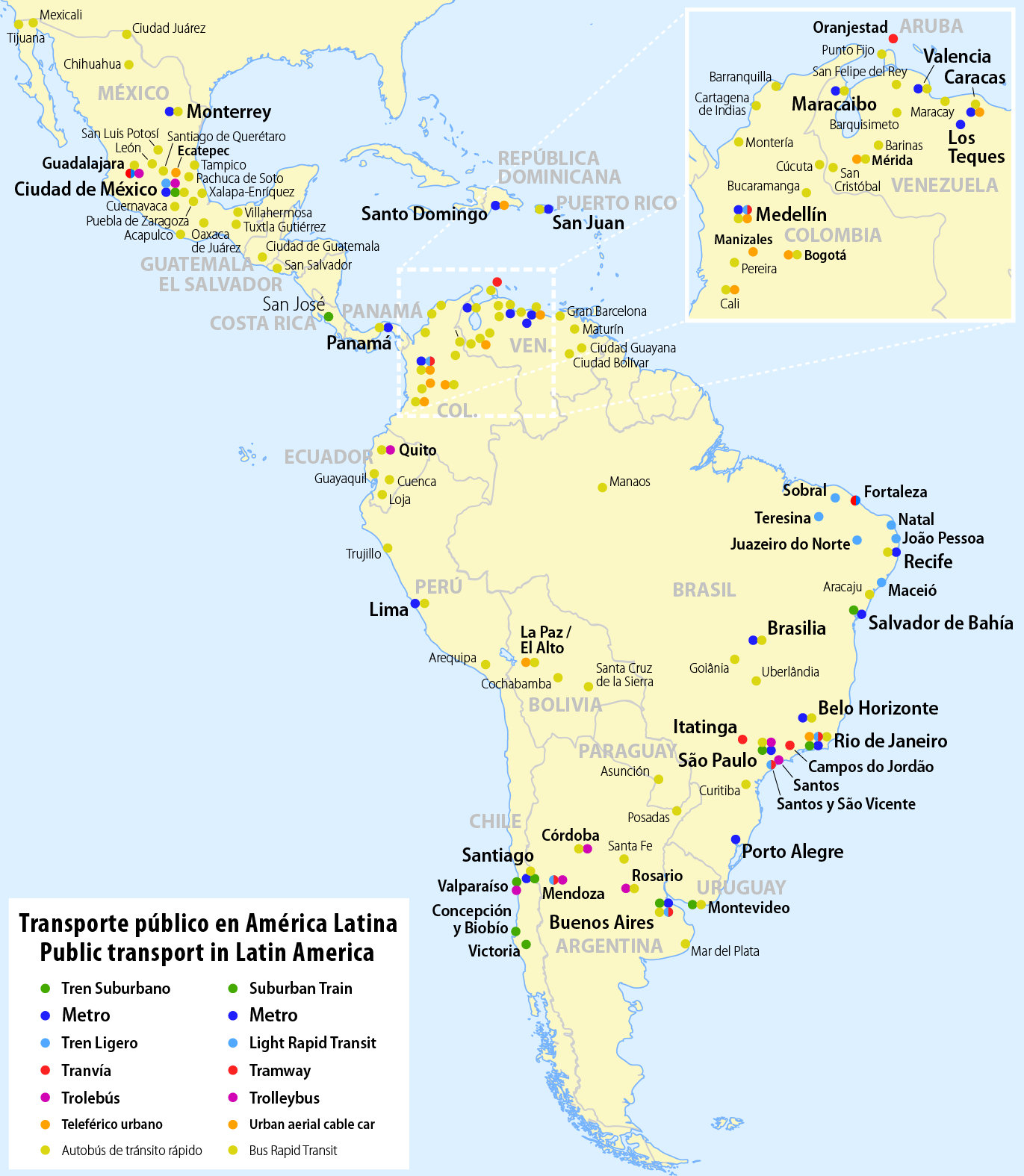
Latin America (2019)

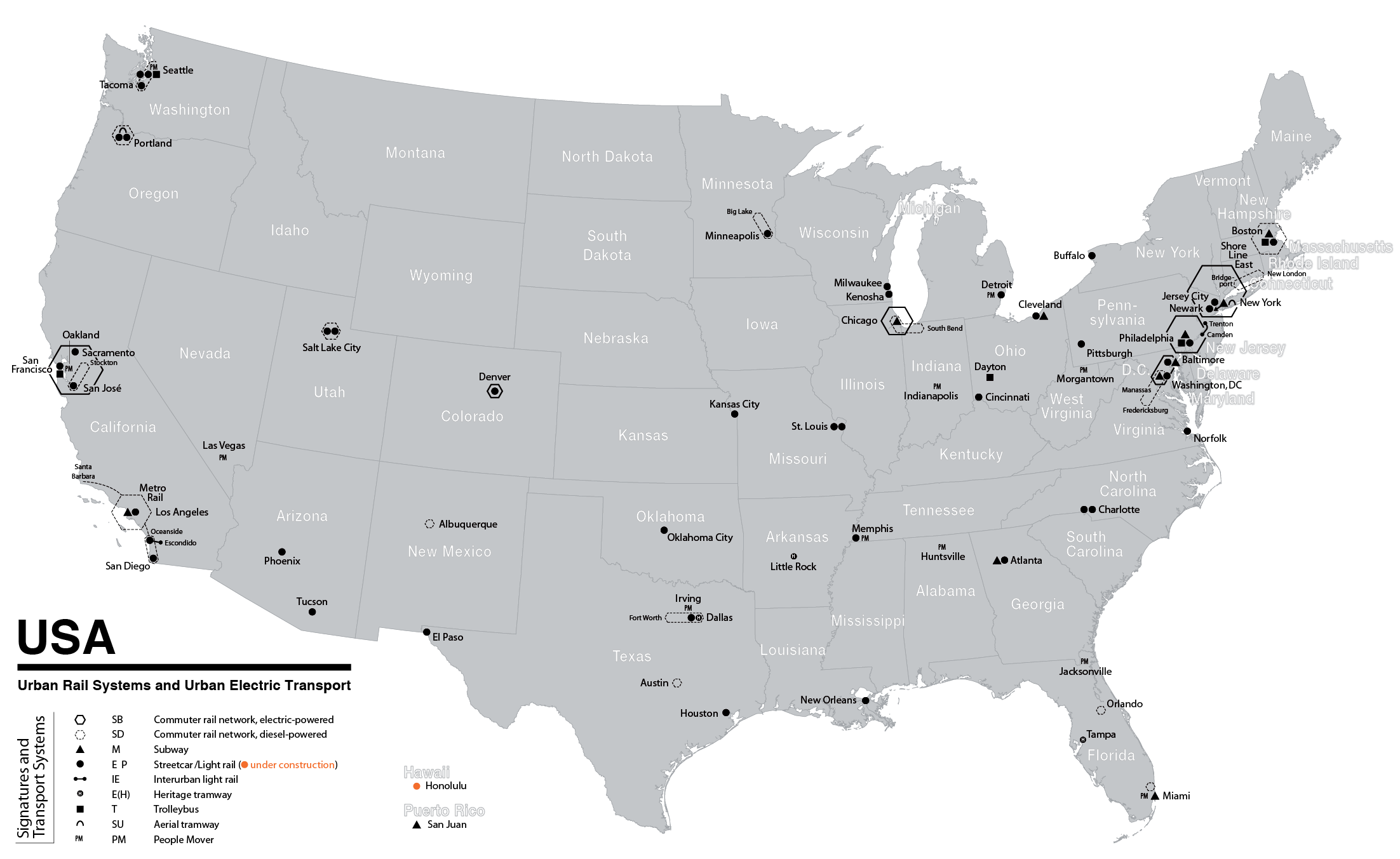
United States (2019)

== See also ==
- History of tram and light rail transit systems by country
- List of largest tram and light rail transit systems ever
- List of tram systems by gauge and electrification
- List of town tramway systems (all-time list)
- List of metro systems
- List of suburban and commuter rail systems
- List of trolleybus systems
- Light metro#List of light metro systems
