= Wonsan Tram =

Tourist tram system in North Korea

Overview
- Locale: (North Korea) Wonsan
- Transit type: Tram
- Number of lines: 1

Operation
- Began operation: June 24, 2025

Technical
- System length: 8.5 kilometes
- Track gauge: 1,000 mm
- Electrification: Overhead

Wonsan Tram (Korean: 원산갈마해안관광지구 궤도전차) is a tourist tram system in Wonsan, Democratic People's Republic of Korea (North Korea). The line opened in 2025, and consists of a single-track tramway that runs 8.5 kilometers.

== Overview ==
According to North Korean media, the construction of a 1,000 mm gauge line was started in 2019 and was scheduled for completion in November 2020, however, it was postponed due to the COVID-19 pandemic. Work on overpasses resumed in 2023 and was completed in 2024 and was opened on June 24, 2025.

The tram line was put into service in late June 2025 at the Wonsan Kalma Coastal Tourist Area on North Korea’s east coast. The line is served by a fleet of three summer trams, designed without doors and windows, and two ordinary vehicles with three double-leaf doors.

== Rolling stock ==
The rolling stock for the Wonsan tram line, consists of five domestically built, four-axle, single-ended trams designed for tourist use created by the Kim Chong-t'ae Electric Locomotive Works. Three of the trams are partially open on the sides to allow for unobstructed views of the Wonsan-Kalma resort.

== See also ==
- Pyongyang Tram
- Chongjin Tram
- Wonsan
- Trams and Trolleybuses in North Korea
- Transport in North Korea
- Pyongyang Metro
- Wonsan Kalma Coastal Tourist Area
