= Wonsan Kalma Coastal Tourist Area =

Wonsan-Kalma Coastal Tourist Area 원산갈마해안관광지구
- Tourist zone
- Location within North Korea
- Coordinates: 39.170604°N 127.489370°E
- Country: North Korea
- Province: Kangwon Province
- City: Wonsan
- Announced: 2025
- Designed capacity of approximately 20,000 visitors
- Time zone: UTC+09:00 (Pyongyang Time)

The Wonsan Kalma Coastal Tourist Area (Korean: 원산갈마해안관광지구) is a seaside resort in Wonsan, North Korea. It was opened to tourists in July 2025. The resort is built along Myongsasimni Beach, a sandy coastline stretching roughly four kilometres along the Kalma Peninsula. The project was first announced by Kim Jong Un in 2018 as part of efforts by the North Korean government to expand tourism in North Korea. The complex includes hotels, entertainment facilities, and transport infrastructure designed to accommodate up to 20,000 visitors. Although the resort was opened to visitors in July 2025, foreign tourism was suspended shortly after opening, while domestic tourists continued to visit.

== History ==
Prior to the development of the resort, parts of the coastal area near Wonsan had been used for military activities, including ballistic missile tests conducted by North Korea and multi-rounds coastal artillery live fire exercise.

In January 2018, Kim Jong Un mentioned plans to develop the coastal area adjacent to Kalma Airfield into a resort area in his New Year's address.

Construction began in January 2018 on a recreational area on the shore of the Sea of Japan in Wonsan, the capital of Kangwon Province. The opening was initially scheduled for October 2019, but was postponed first due to construction delays, then due to the COVID-19 pandemic. In December 2024, North Korean authorities announced that the opening, scheduled for May 2025, would be postponed to June 2025. The KCNA later released photographs showing Kim Jong Un and his daughter Kim Ju Ae inspecting the resort’s facilities ahead of its planned opening.

On June 24, 2025, a grand opening ceremony for the tourist complex was held with the participation of North Korean President Kim Jong Un and Alexandr Matsegora, the Russian Ambassador to North Korea and the embassy staff. On July 1, the resort opened to visitors. On July 18, 2025, the authorities announced that it would no longer accept foreign tourists. In August 2025, Russian tour operators began advertising tours to the Wonsan Kalma resort. Authorities reported that the resort hosted 300,000 domestic visitors in the second half of 2025.

In 2026 it appeared that North Korean government winded down a short summer season of domestic group tours and that authorities are mainly using the resort for positive internal propaganda and to motivate workers with the promise of reward trips. Satellite imagery showed that the two main parking lots at the north and south ends of the three-mile-long beach resort, as well as parking areas in front of various hotels, were mostly empty throughout 2026 until they started to fill up in mid- to late-July.

=== Diplomatic visits ===
In July 2025, the resort was chosen as the location for meetings between Russian Foreign Minister Sergei Lavrov and Kim Jong Un.

In February 2026, Chinese ambassador to North Korea Wang Yajun led a delegation to the resort, raising hopes that Chinese tourists will be able to visit the zone, which remains closed to most foreign travelers. In July 2026, a Chinese delegation led by Wang Huning, the chairman of the National Committee of the Chinese People's Political Consultative Conference, visited the resort as part of a visit to North Korea. According to the Korean Central News Agency, they received a briefing about the area's service capacity, operational status and future development plans, as well as "taking in panoramic views" of the beach.

== Facilities ==
The resort is located along Myongsasimni Beach, a sandy coastline stretching roughly four kilometres along the Kalma Peninsula.

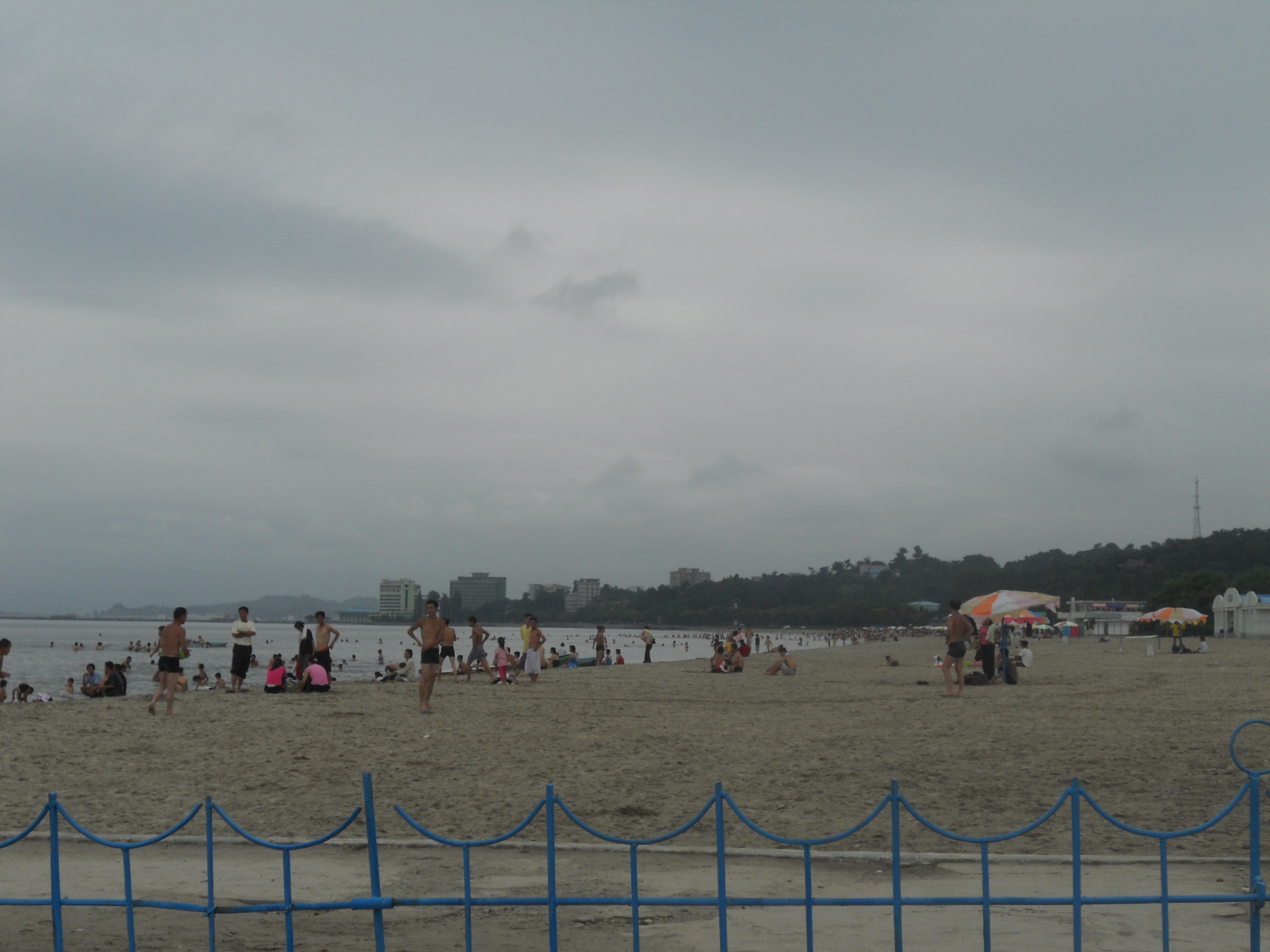
Myongsasimni Beach

There are six large hotels, 37 motels (also known as ryeogwan), and ten large unnamed buildings which serves as residential facilities. An analysis by NK News found that only some of the motels were operational, while most of the facilities remained unused. The resort is designed to accommodate 20,000 people.

=== Hotels and accommodation ===
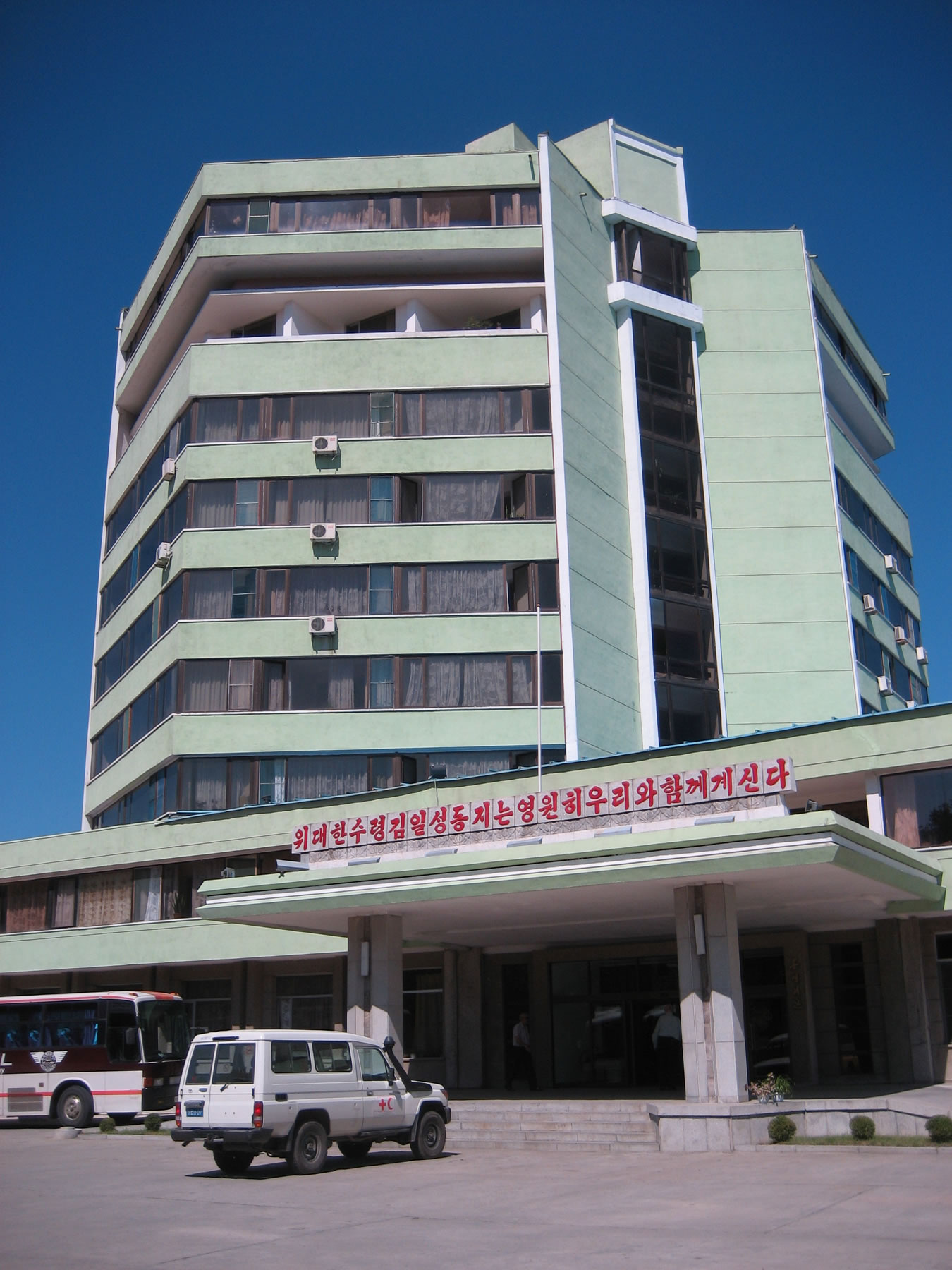
Tongymyong Hotel, Wonsan

Seventeen luxury hotels were planned for the resort, of which six had been completed by 2025. Official tourism maps published in 2025 shows that the resort includes several named hotels as well as several smaller accommodation facilities. In addition to the main hotels, the resort contains a number of motels (ryeogwan), which serve as lower-cost lodging options.

=== Entertainment ===
Entertainment facilities include the Myongsasimni Theatre, a newly built performance venue located within the resort. The venue is designed to host performances, art troupes, and various events for tourists, including international festivals.

The complex also includes the Myongsasimni Water Park, a luxury water park. The main structure of the park is complete but lacks features such as water slides. The water park includes a number of pools and a lazy river water ride. The resort also features the Mokran Recreation Centre, which is part of a leisure complex for visitors to the coastal area.

The resort has sightseeing electric carts. These tourist cars were locally designed and manufactured.

=== Transport infrastructure ===
Wonsan Kalma Coastal Tourist Area has its own dedicated railway infrastructure, which has been upgraded to support the new, large-scale resort. The railway line is on the Kangwon Line of the Korean State Railway.

The Wonsan Tram is a tourist tram that was opened on 26 June 2025. It consists of a single-track tramway that runs 8.5 kilometres (5.3 mi). It was built to connect different parts of the resort.

The resort is served by several trolleybuses to facilitate access for visitors to the beach resort area. In 2020, North Korean state media reported on the expansion of the trolleybus network to support the massive Wonsan-Kalma coastal tourist area. New routes were established to link key areas, including the Kalma Peninsula. As of late 2020, new routes were planned connecting to Kalma, Myongsasipri, and Songdowon, utilizing a depot near Wonsan Station.

Besides tram networks, long-distance intercity railways are also expected to enter service soon, with the new Kalma Tourist Railway Station will serve as the primary intercity and international rail transportation gateway to the resort zone. Constructed in just one year on the electrified Kangwon Line, the station transformed the area's legacy infrastructure from a predominantly industrial freight line into a modern passenger hub complete with dedicated tourist amenities, retail spaces, and lounges. The North Korean government intends for the facility to optimise travel logistics and improve convenience for domestic vacationers and international tour groups. Following a field guidance conducted by Kim Jong Un on 24 June 2026, the state mandated the composition of specialised trains designated exclusively for tourists. It declared the project a national benchmark for the architectural and scientific modernisation of provincial railway stations nationwide.

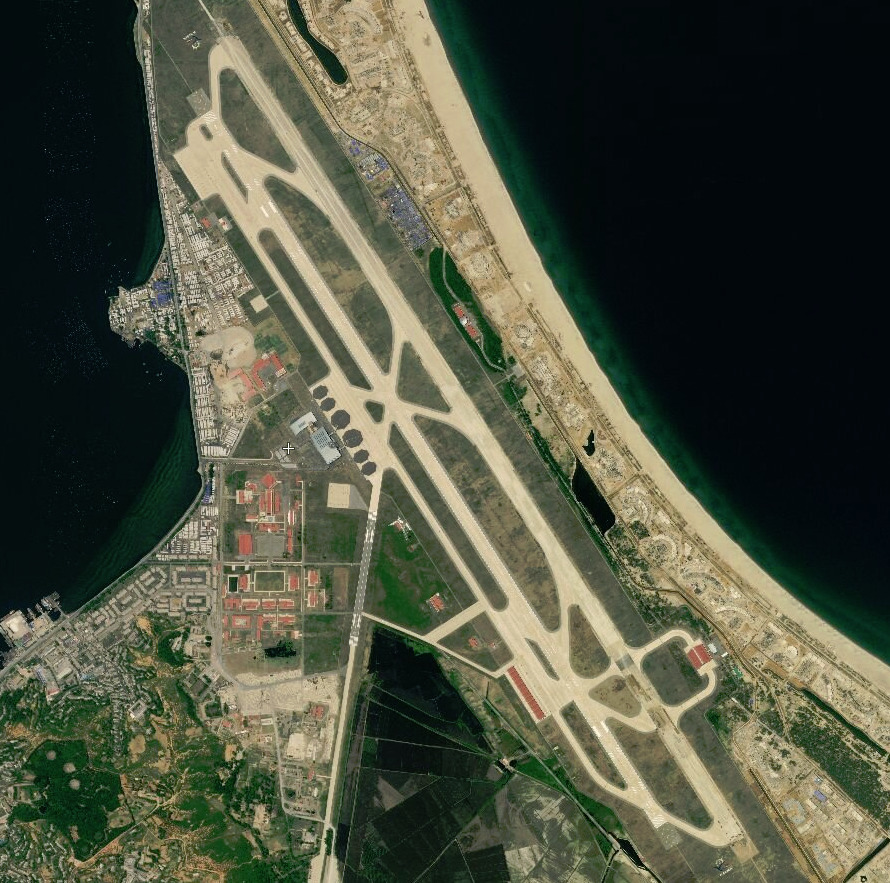
Kalma Airport

The resort is served by Kalma Airport (IATA: WOS, ICAO: ZKWS). Air Koryo connects Wonsan to Pyongyang Sunan International Airport. A new international terminal was built in 2015. It is reported that the airport cost around $200 million to build, with most of the work being carried out by the military.

== Significance ==
The resort forms part of a broader effort by the North Korean government to develop the country's coastal regions into a major tourism hub on the country's east coast.

== Reception ==
The Wonsan Kalma Coastal Tourist Area has been described by the state media as a "national treasure-level tourism city". The state media also mentioned that Kim Jong Un personally cut the ribbon of the new resort. During the opening, North Korean officials stated that they expected tourists from Russia to visit the resort.

The South Korean media described the new tourist area as North Korea's Waikiki.

Analysts have described the resort as part of North Korea’s broader strategy to expand tourism and generate foreign currency, particularly by attracting visitors from Russia and China, following years of UN sanctions. Reports after the resort’s opening also indicated that parts of the resort were not fully operational.

== See also ==
- Kangwon Province
- Tourism in North Korea
