= Trams in Chongjin =

Tram system in Chongjin, North Korea

Chongjin Tram

Overview
- Locale: (North Korea) Chongjin
- Transit type: Tram
- Number of lines: 1

Operation
- Began operation: 1999
- Operators: Transport and Communication Commission
- Character: At-grade
- Train length: Single car tram or articulated tram

Technical
- System length: 13 km
- Track gauge: 1,435 mm (4 ft 8 1/2 in)
- Electrification: Overhead

- Chongjin Tram
- Chosŏn'gŭl: 청진궤도전차
- Hancha: 淸津軌道電車
- Revised Romanization: Cheongjin gwedojeoncha
- McCune–Reischauer: Ch'ŏngjin kwedojŏnch'a

Chongjin Tram is a public tram system in Chongjin, Democratic People's Republic of Korea (North Korea). The line opened in 1999. There is currently one line in operation.

== History ==
The regular operation on the standard gauge tram line started on 2 July 1999. It was initially six kilometers long and was extended in a later by seven kilometers. Allegedly, according to Choson Sinbo, there were plans to extend the line to Chongjin station with a planned opening date of October 2002, though this is not corroborated elsewhere.

== Lines ==
- Sabong-dong - South Chongjin - Bongchon-dong

== Rolling Stock ==
Chongjin tram uses a number of locally produced single car trams and a single articulated tram. All vehicles are produced by Chongjin Bus Factory. The production of trams began early, with the first completed tram rolled out in 1990. These single trams bear an extreme resemblance to the Tatra T6B5, but have one more window per side and no resistor equipment on roof. The articulated tram rather appears like a Tatra KT8D5 without the middle section.

== See also ==
- Trams and trolleybuses in North Korea
- Transport in North Korea
- List of tram and light rail transit systems
