= RATP Group =

French public transport operator

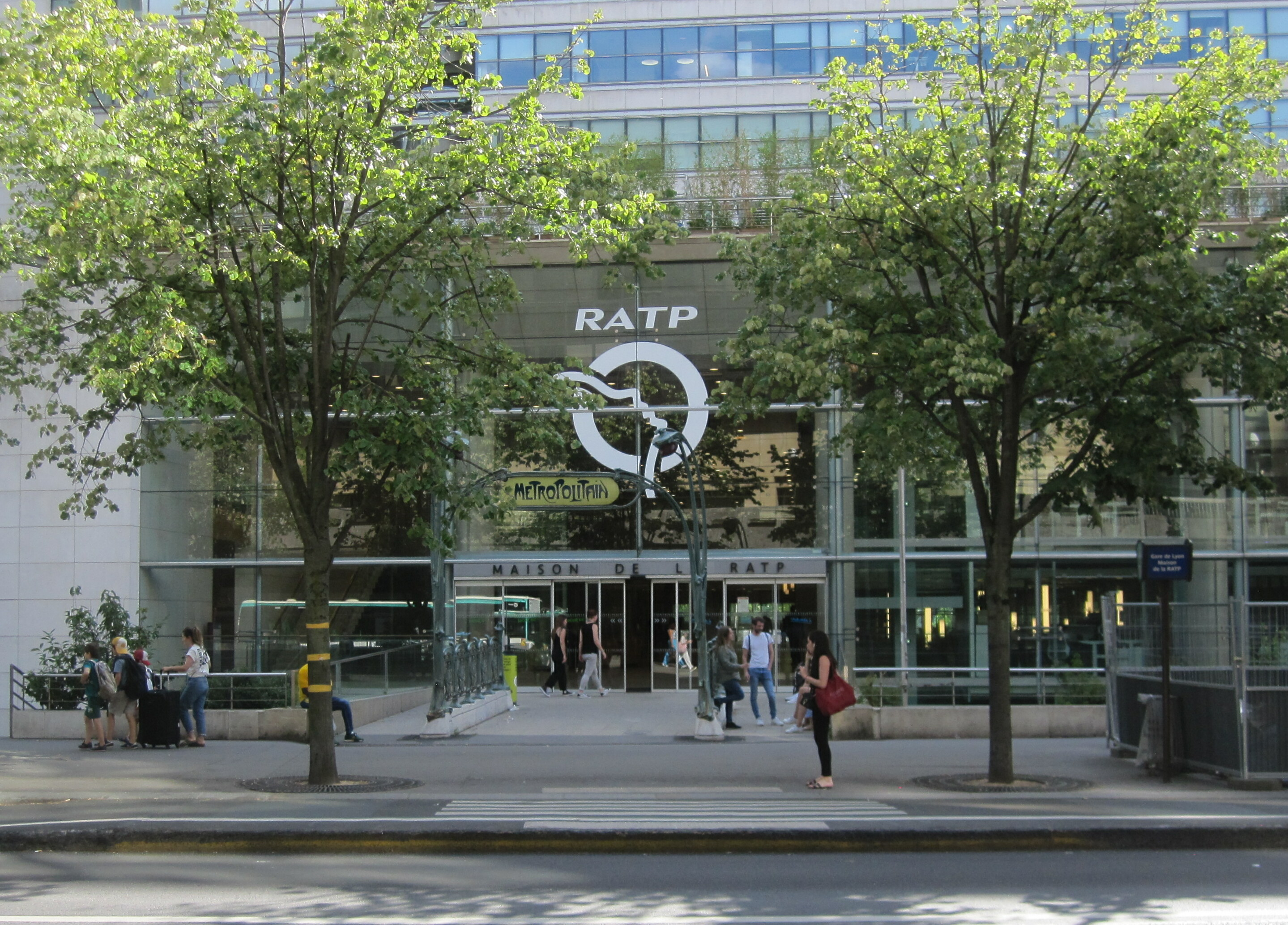
- RATP Group headquarters in Paris
- Type: EPIC
- Industry: Public transport
- Founded: 1 January 1949; 77 years ago in Paris
- Headquarters: Paris, France
- Area served: Worldwide
- Key people: Jean Bassères (acting CEO)
- Revenue: €7.1 billion (2024)
- Owner: Government of France
- Number of employees: 73,500 (2024)
- Subsidiaries: RATP Cap Île-de-France; RATP Capital Innovation; RATP Connect; RATP Dev; RATP Habitat; RATP Logistics; RATP Maintenance Services; RATP Real Estate; RATP Smart Systems; RATP Travel Retail
- Website: ratpgroup.com/en/

The RATP Group (French: Groupe RATP) is a French state-owned enterprise (EPIC) that operates public transport systems primarily in Paris, France, with growing presence internationally. Headquartered in Paris, it originally operated under the name Régie autonome des transports parisiens (English: Parisian Autonomous Transport Administration, lit. 'Autonomous Management of Parisian Transportation'). Its logo represents the Seine's meandering path through the Paris Region stylised as the face of a person looking up.

Describing itself as the third largest actor in public transport worldwide, in 2024, RATP Group consolidates a total revenue of 7.1 billion euros, employs over 73,500 people, and provides for over 4 billion passenger journeys annually.

RATP Group was established in 1949 with the express purpose of operating Paris's public transport system. During the twentieth century, it focused solely on the provision of the capital's various forms of transit, from the Paris Métro, Île-de-France tram, and the RATP bus network, as well as part of the regional express rail (RER) network. However, since 2002, RATP Group's operations have no longer been geographically restricted; it has competitively pursued contracts to operate transit systems around the world. It also had a partnership with, and a minority shareholding in, Transdev, which has further involved RATP Group in various global transport operations. During 2002, RATP Dev was created as the Group's dedicated international operations and maintenance subsidiary; it is present in 16 countries across Africa, Asia, Australia, Europe and North America.

RATP Group's Paris-related activities are still a major part of its business through to the present day; in 2019, it was recorded that, in the Île-de-France region, it carried roughly 3.3 billion passengers per year. In 2019, RATP Group's consolidated revenue was €5.704 billion; it employed 64,000 people at that time. In recent decades, the company has operated on an increasingly competitive basis as a result of legislative changes.

== History ==
The RATP was created on 1 January 1949 by combining the assets of the Compagnie du chemin de fer métropolitain de Paris (CMP), which operated the Paris Métro, and the Société des Transports en Commun de la Région Parisienne (STCRP), which operated the city's bus system.

Prior to this, the CMP had absorbed the Nord-Sud Company in 1930 and the Ligne de Sceaux in 1937, which operated commuter rail to the suburbs. The STCRP had been created on 1 January 1921 by the merger of about half a dozen independent bus and streetcar operators in the Paris area. By the time the STCRP was merged into the RATP, all of its streetcars had been replaced by bus routes.

=== Shift towards competitive operations ===
A major change in French law came on 3 November 2009, when article 5 of the ARAF (French rail regulatory body) law came into effect. This law opens public transport operation to competition. The law was part of a broader push by the European Union to open all passenger transport operation to competition. Under this law, the RATP Group lost the exclusive right to operate all new public transport lines immediately. The company's exclusive operation rights for existing lines would expire over time, with the bus network going out to bid 15 years later in 2024, the tram network (Lines T1, T2 & T3) going out to bid 20 years later in 2029, and the Metro and RER lines out to bid 30 years later in 2039.

With the RATP anticipating this shift to a competitive environment, the company began to reorganize itself.

In the early years of the 21st century, a partnership with Transdev resulted in RATP acquiring a minority shareholding in that group, with its many worldwide transport operations. However, in 2009, the Caisse des dépôts et consignations, the majority owner of the Transdev, started negotiations with Veolia to merge Transdev with Veolia Transport. As part of the resulting agreement, made in May 2010, it was agreed that RATP would take over ownership of some of Transdev's operations in lieu of cash payment for its holdings in Transdev. This gave RATP a considerable number of international operations.

In 2009, RATP entered the United States by purchasing transit contractor McDonald Transit Associates. McDonald operated Fort Worth Transportation Authority (now Trinity Metro) in Texas, Votran in Florida, and Waco Transit System in Texas, among others. On 1 August 2011, the RATP Group purchased Stagecoach Metrolink's contract to operate the Metrolink light rail system in Greater Manchester, England until July 2017. Two years later, in 2013, RATP purchased the nearby long-established coach company, Selwyns Travel, a National Express operator.

In 2023, RATP Dev definitively left Algeria following the transfer of all its interests in Algerian tramways to an Algerian state-owned group. Since 2012, and growing with the progressive opening of networks, RATP Dev managed up to seven tramway networks in Algiers, Oran, Constantine, Sidi Bel Abbès, Ouargla, and Sétif, thus marking over a decade of strong development of this mode of transport in the country. From 2011 to 2020, RATP Dev was also responsible for the operation and maintenance of the Algiers metro.

As of 1 January 2025, RATP Dev took over the operation and maintenance of Lyon's heavy public transport modes for a period of at least 10 years, marking a major new step in its development, particularly its presence in France outside the Île-de-France region. The contract with SYTRAL Mobilités, won against one of its main competitors, Keolis, includes the Lyon metro, tramway, the Rhônexpress airport link, the funiculars, and the Navigône river shuttle on the Saône.

In December 2025, the sale of RATP Dev's remaining UK activities – Tootbus London and Tootbus Bath – to FirstGroup was announced. Following this transaction, RATP Dev exited the UK market and discontinued its tourist bus operations outside of Paris and Brussels.

=== Presidents ===
The current president and CEO of the RATP, Jean Castex, is in office since 28 November 2022.

Hiba Farès is the Chairman of the Board of RATP Dev since January 2022.

== Operations in Paris ==
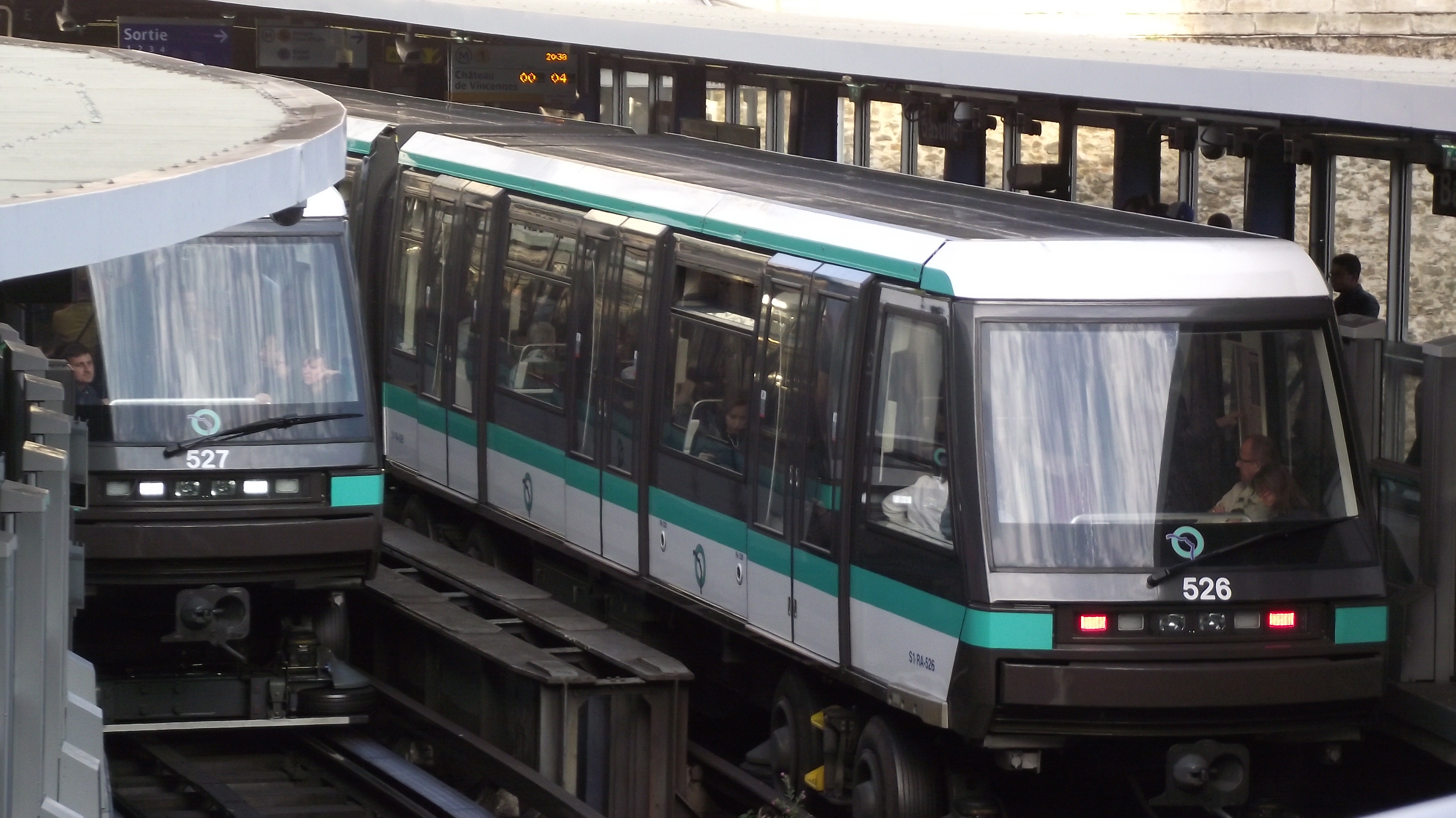
Two MP 05 train sets of Paris Métro Line 1 at Bastille station

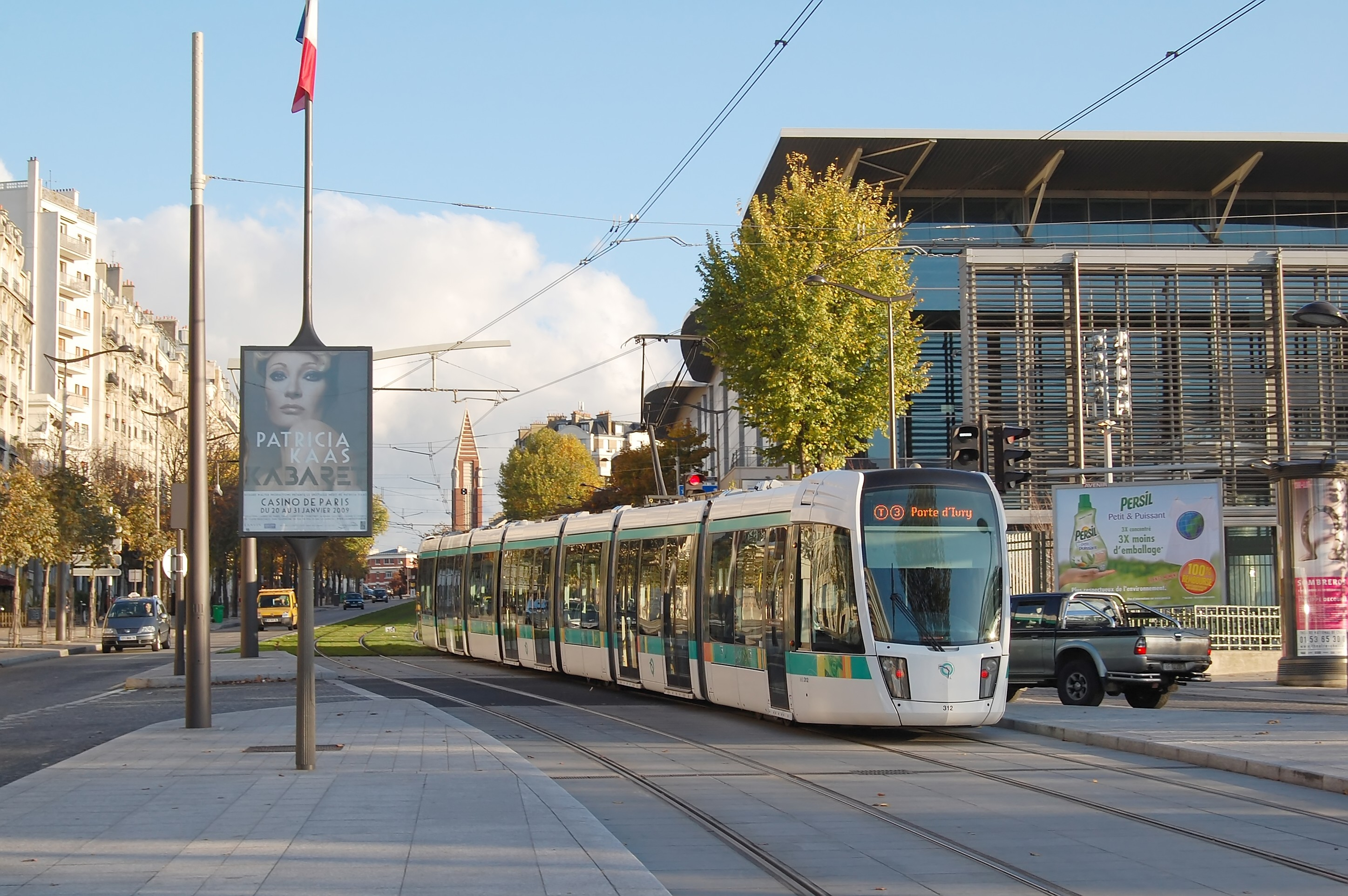
RATP tram on tramway line T3a at Porte de Versailles

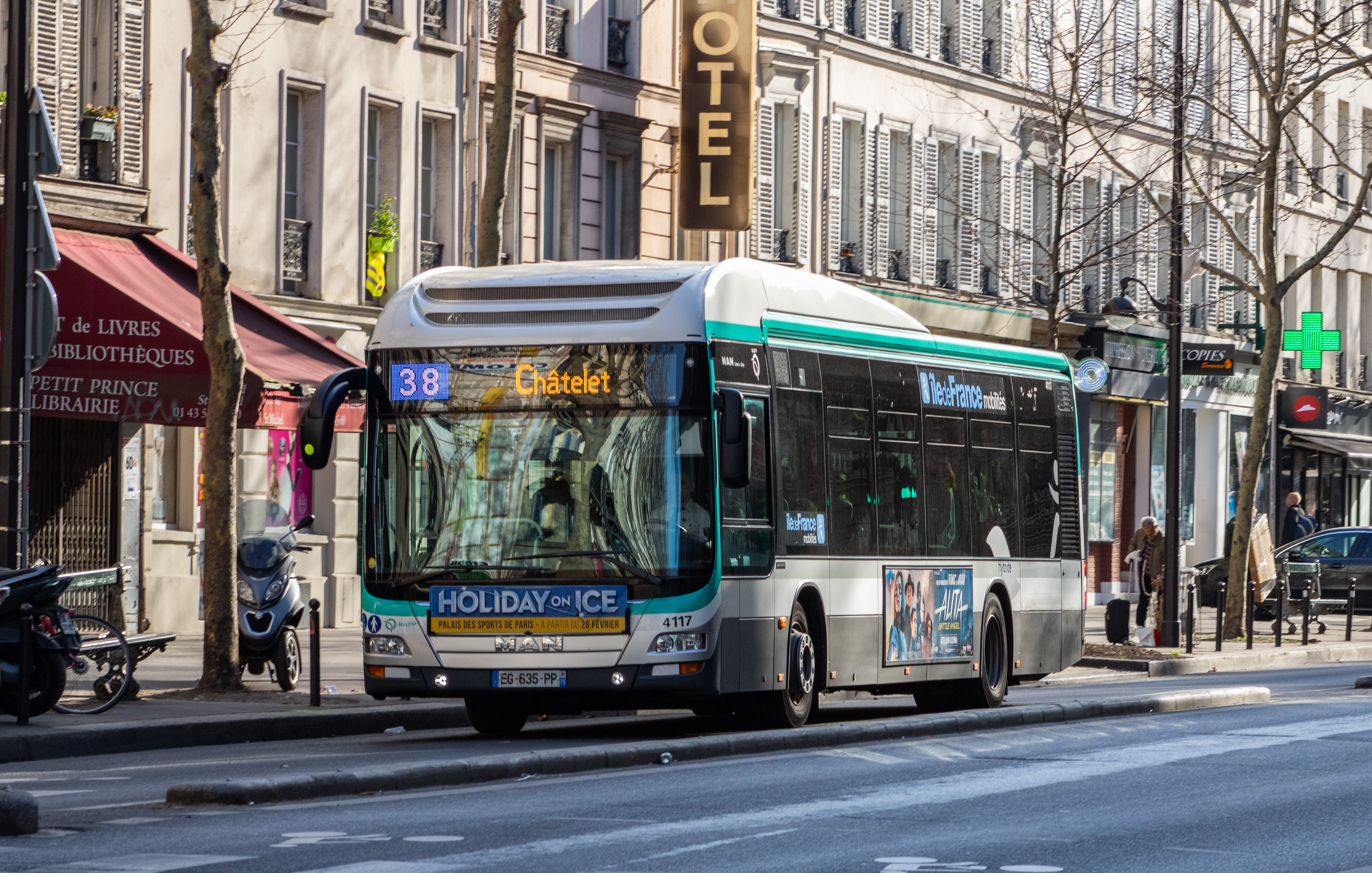
RATP hybrid bus on Paris route 38

In Paris, RATP operates, under its own name, on behalf of and under contract with Île-de-France Mobilités (IDFM), the Paris region transit authority. RATP's services constitute, in their own right, a multi-mode public transportation infrastructure, but also contribute to a larger multi-mode system extending out into the surrounding Île-de-France communities.

RATP's services in the Greater Paris area include:

- The Paris Métro, a system of mostly underground rapid transit lines which run throughout the city, with some lines extending somewhat beyond the city boundaries. The Métro has 16 lines with 245.6 km (152.6 mi) of track and 321 stations. Three metro lines are fully automated and driverless: Line 1 (since 2012), Line 4 (since 2023) and Line 14 (since its opening in 1998).
- Orlyval, the automated shuttle serving Orly Airport.
- The busiest parts of the RER, the Paris regional express rail network that runs mostly underground in the centre of Paris and overground in the rest of the region. RATP owns and operates most of lines A and B, both together representing approximately 115 km (71 mi) and 66 stations. The rest of the RER network is operated by SNCF.
- Nine out of the fourteen lines of the Paris tram system (T1, T2, T3a, T3b, T5, T6, T7, T8, T10) totaling 109.6 km (68.1 mi) and 197 stops.
- The extensive Paris city bus system (351 lines with a total length of 3,861 km (2,399 mi)), including the majority of the Noctilien night buses.
- Two BRT lines: the Trans-Val-de-Marne (TVM, 19.7 km (12.2 mi)) and line 393 (11.7 km (7.3 mi)).
- The Montmartre funicular.

Paris bus route 341 was RATP's first line equipped with 100% electric full-size buses (starting June 2016). By early 2021, there were over 150 full battery electric buses in the fleet with a target of 1,500 by 2025.

With regard to the future Grand Paris Express orbital metro network of which all lines will be fully automated and driverless, RATP will act as the infrastructure manager for lines 15, 16, 17 and 18, and operate Paris Métro Line 15 through the ORA consortium led by RATP Dev with minority partners ComfortDelGro and Alstom.

== Operations outside Paris ==
RATP Dev (Dev being a contraction of Développement, French for development), established in 2002 as a 100% subsidiary of the RATP Group, provides operations and maintenance of passenger transport services outside of the "historical" RATP network in the Greater Paris area.

RATP Dev is currently present in 16 countries, namely Australia, Belgium, Canada, Hong Kong, Egypt, France, Italy, Morocco, the Philippines, Qatar, Saudi Arabia, Serbia, Singapore, South Africa, Switzerland, and the United States. Wholly and partly owned operations include the following:

=== Operations in France ===
==== Heavy rail ====
- Future CDG Express, express rail link between Paris Gare de l'Est and Charles de Gaulle Airport expected to launch in March 2027 (through the Hello Paris joint venture with Keolis)
- Future "Étoile de Caen", regional rail services in the Normandy region (from mid-2027 on, routes: Caen/Coutances, Caen/Saint-Lô, Caen/Evreux, Caen/Cherbourg, Caen/Rouen, Caen/Lisieux, Caen/Granville, Caen/Rennes, Lisieux/Trouville-Deauville, Trouville-Deauville/Dives-Cabourg)

==== Other modes ====
- Agglobus, the network of Bourges in the Cher department (since 2011, renewed for the 2017–2022 period, and again renewed for the 2023–2030 period)
- ALPBUS, operating various school, shuttle and coach services as well as fixed routes services including, among others, the bus network serving Cluses and cross-border services between France and Switzerland with routes connecting Annecy, Thonon-les-Bains and Sallanches with Geneva Airport
- The AXO network covering the Communauté d'agglomération Creil Sud Oise (for the 2021–2028 period)
- The Bibus multimodal network in and around Brest including the Brest tramway and Brest cable car, in the Finistère department (for the 2019–2027 period)
- The IZILO network of Lorient Agglomération in the Morbihan department (since 2018, renewed for the 2024–2032 period)
- Com'Bus, Yvelines and Val-d'Oise departments
- The Impulsyon network of La Roche-sur-Yon in the Vendée department (since 2010, renewed for the 2017–2023 period)
- The Irigo multimodal in and around Angers including the Angers tramway (for the 2019–2025 period)
- The Kicéo network of Vannes in the Morbihan department (for the 2017-2023 period)
- Lignes de Vienne et agglomération (L'va) in and around Vienne in the Isère department (since 2011)
- Le Vib in Vierzon in the Cher department (since 2011, renewed in 2015 for 8 more years)
- The Marinéo network of Boulogne-sur-Mer in the Pas-de-Calais department (since 2013, renewed in 2021 for another 6 years)
- The Mistral network of Métropole Toulon Provence Méditerranée area in the Var department
- Mouvéo, the network of Épernay in the Marne department (since 2016)
- Ondéa, the network of Aix-les-Bains and its surroundings in the Savoie department (since 2014, renewed in 2021 for another 7 years)
- "RIO 4", regional and school bus services in the Oise department (since 2021)
- TAAM, paratransit in and around Amiens in the Somme department (since 2021)
- Transports annemassiens collectifs (TAC), the network covering the Agglomeration community of Annemasse – Les Voirons (joint control with TPG)
- Transports de l'agglomération de Charleville-Mézières (TAC), the network of Charleville-Mézières and Sedan in the Ardennes department (since 2012, renewed for the 2017–2024 period)
- TBK bus and coach network covering Quimperlé and surroundings in the Finistère department (for the 2020-2028 period)
- Transports urbains laonnois (TUL), the network of Laon in the Aisne department (since 2016, renewed for the 2023–2029)
- Transports urbains lavallois (TUL), the network of Laval in the Mayenne department (for the 2023-2031 period)
- Transports en Commun Lyonnais (TCL), the operation and maintenance of rolling stock, infrastructure upkeep and safety on the TCL network (from January 2025 and for a period of 10 years).
- RATP Dev operates the coastal zone of the Basque Country network Txik Txak, and Transdev will handle the retro-coastal zone in association with local transport company Hiruak Bat (since 2024)

=== Other activities ===
In December 2022, RATP Dev launches hydrogen training center in La Roche-sur-Yon.

In June 2024, RATP partnered with Wabtec to equip all its RER A trains with a new brake lining that eliminates 70-90% of the health-damaging fine particles found on platforms. Similar tests are being carried out on some metro lines. The same year, RATP and Île-de-France Mobilités signed an accessibility charter to make it easier for blind and partially-sighted people to travel on Île-de-France's transport network.

=== Operations outside France ===
==== Heavy rail ====
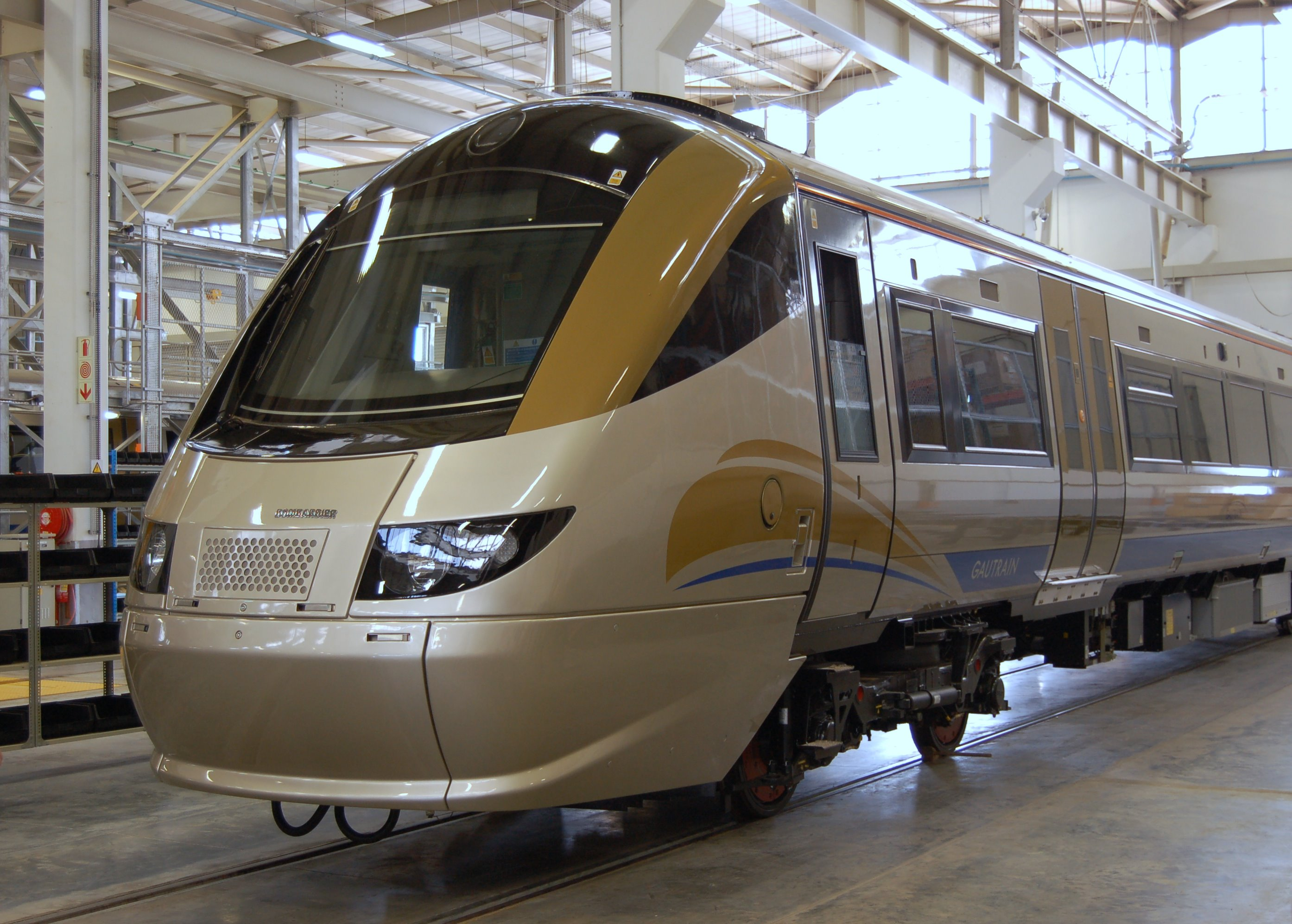
A Gautrain Bombardier Electrostar unit in South Africa.

- Gautrain, regional express train in Gauteng province, South Africa, linking Johannesburg, Pretoria and O. R. Tambo International Airport (since 2010)
- Cairo-New Cairo railway, regional rail service between Cairo and the new administrative capital of Egypt (since 2022)
- "La Ferroviaria Italiana", two regional rail lines in Tuscany, Italy (minority share)

==== Metro and tramway ====
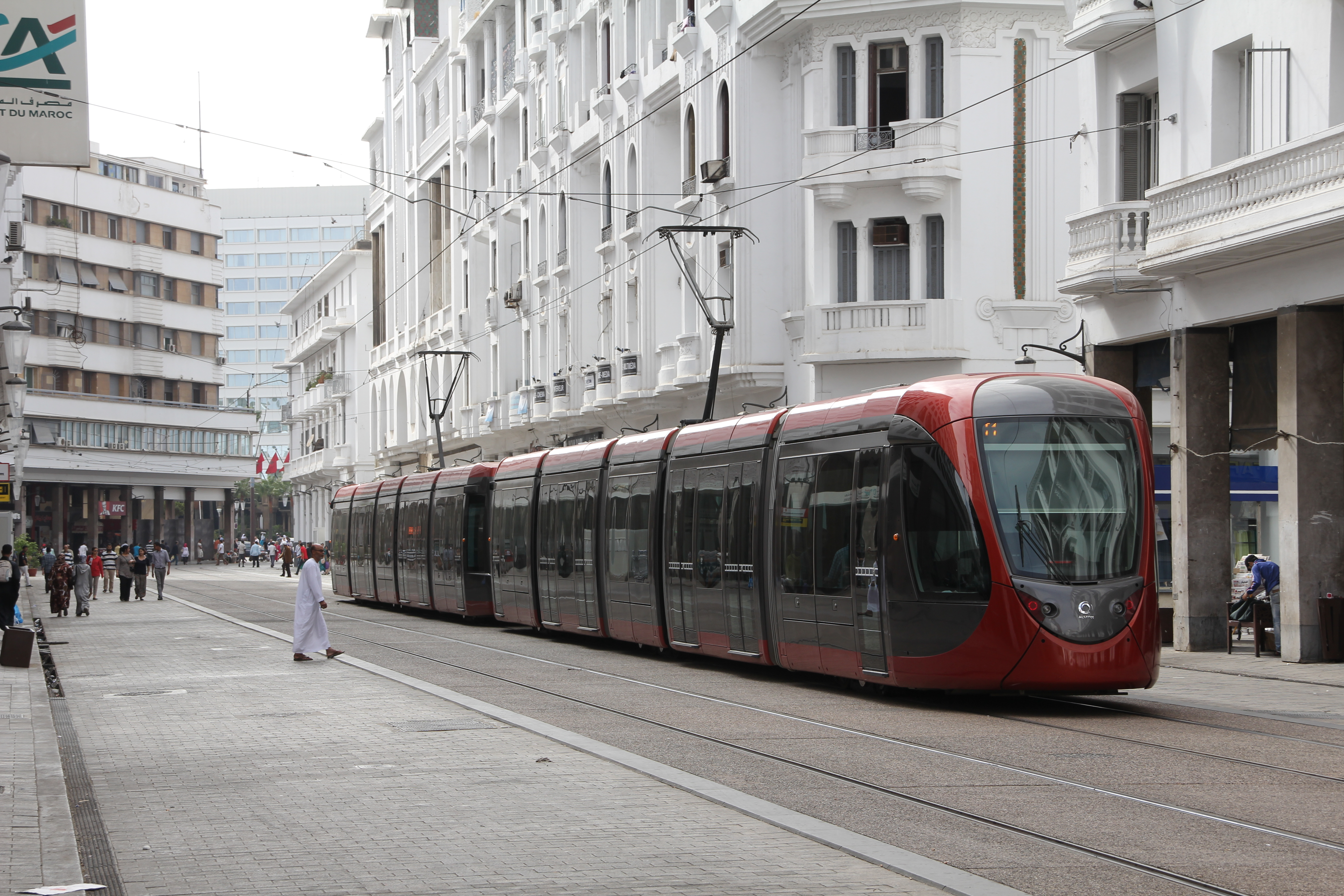
A Casablanca Tramway Alstom Citadis 302 in Casablanca

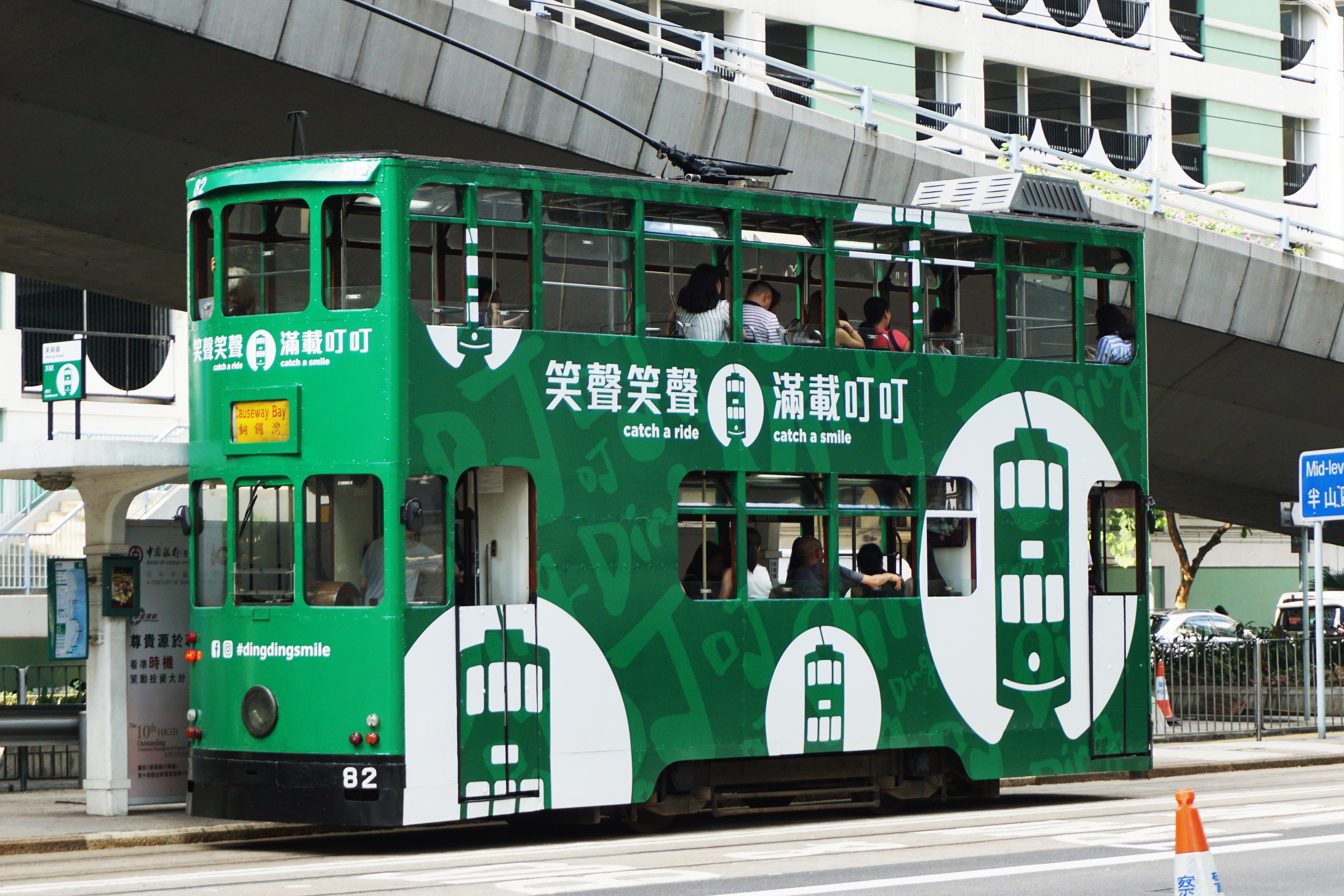
A typical Hong Kong tram double-deck car.

- Future Sydney Metro Western Sydney Airport, Australia (15 years of operations and maintenance starting 2026)
- Future Melbourne Suburban Rail Loop, Australia (design alliance followed by 15 years of operations and maintenance after 2035)
- Cairo Metro Line 3, Cairo, Egypt (for the 2020-2035 period)
- Florence tramway, Florence, Italy (since 2010)
- Casablanca LRT, Casablanca, Morocco (since 2012, contract renewed in 2017 until the end of 2029)
- Hong Kong Tramways, Hong Kong (since 2009)
- Manila Line 1, Manila, Philippines (technical assistance, since 2014)
- MATA Trolley, Memphis, Tennessee, United States (since 2021)
- Sun Link Streetcar, Tucson, Arizona, United States (since 2013, renewed in 2019)
- Doha Metro and Lusail Tram, Qatar (20-year contract through RKH Qitarat, joint venture formed by Hamad Group (51%) and Keolis-RATP Dev (49%))
- Riyadh Metro Lines 1 and 2 (12-year contract)
- Future Jurong Region MRT line, Singapore (minority position in a partnership with SBS Transit, scheduled to start revenue service in 2028).
- KBH Metro Partner, a joint venture with ComfortDelGro will take over the Copenhagen Metro in September 2027 under a 12 year contract.

==== Bus and coach ====
===== Italy =====
- Tuscany regional bus network including 4,800 employees, 2,700 vehicles and 57 depots, via the Autolinee Toscane subsidiary (since 1 November 2021, for a duration of 11 years)
- Cilia Italia, Lazio

===== United Kingdom =====
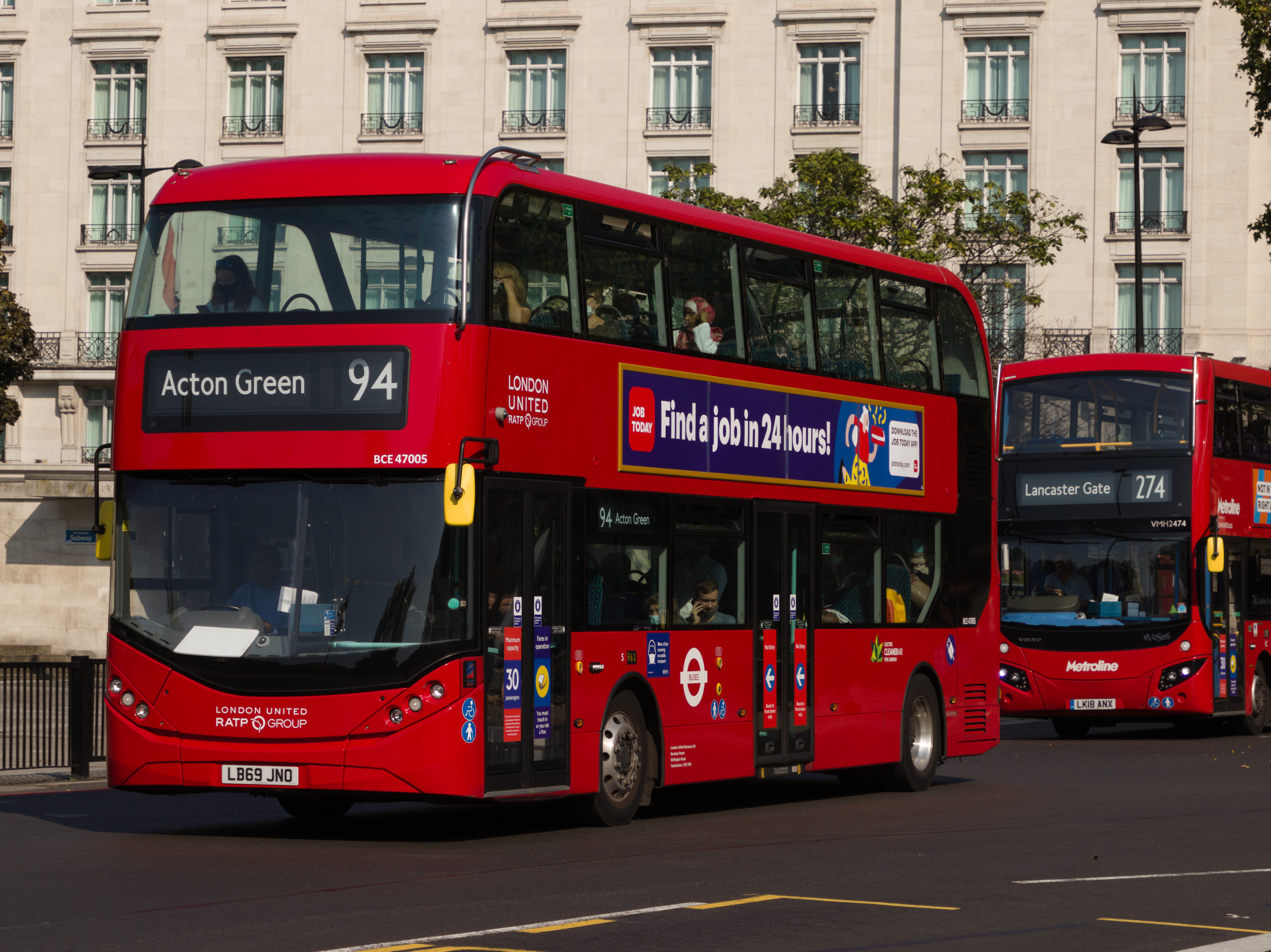
A London United Alexander Dennis Enviro400EV battery electric bus on route 94.

RATP Dev's presence in the United Kingdom is mainly concentrated in London with its portfolio of bus services on behalf of Transport for London. Through its three subsidiaries London United, Quality Line (acquired as Epsom Coaches in April 2012) and London Sovereign (acquired in April 2014), RATP Dev manages 1129 vehicles on 96 routes out of 10 garages, and has 3387 employees, as of 2020. Early 2021, RATP Dev announced that it is to close its Quality Line subsidiary and Epsom depot. The closure was effective as of July 2021.

On 16 June 2021, the firm announced it had placed an order for 195 electric buses for its London operations to be delivered jointly by Alexander Dennis and BYD Auto, the by then largest ever full battery electric bus order in the UK.

On 22 September 2021, RATP Dev and SeaLink Travel Group (now Kelsian Group) announced that their respective West London bus operations (including London United, London Sovereign and Tower Transit's Westbourne Park garage) would merge into a new joint venture called RATP Dev Transit London, with RATP Dev holding 87.5% of shares and SeaLink 12.5%. The incorporation of the joint venture was finalised on 11 December 2021. Tower Transit's Lea Interchange garage, located in East London, was not part of the joint venture and remained unaffected until sold off separately to Stagecoach London.

On 28 February 2025, RATP Dev sold their London operations to FirstGroup, which was announced in December 2024. FirstGroup also took over their London and Bath sightseeing operations, as well as the Bath to Bristol Airport service.

===== United States =====
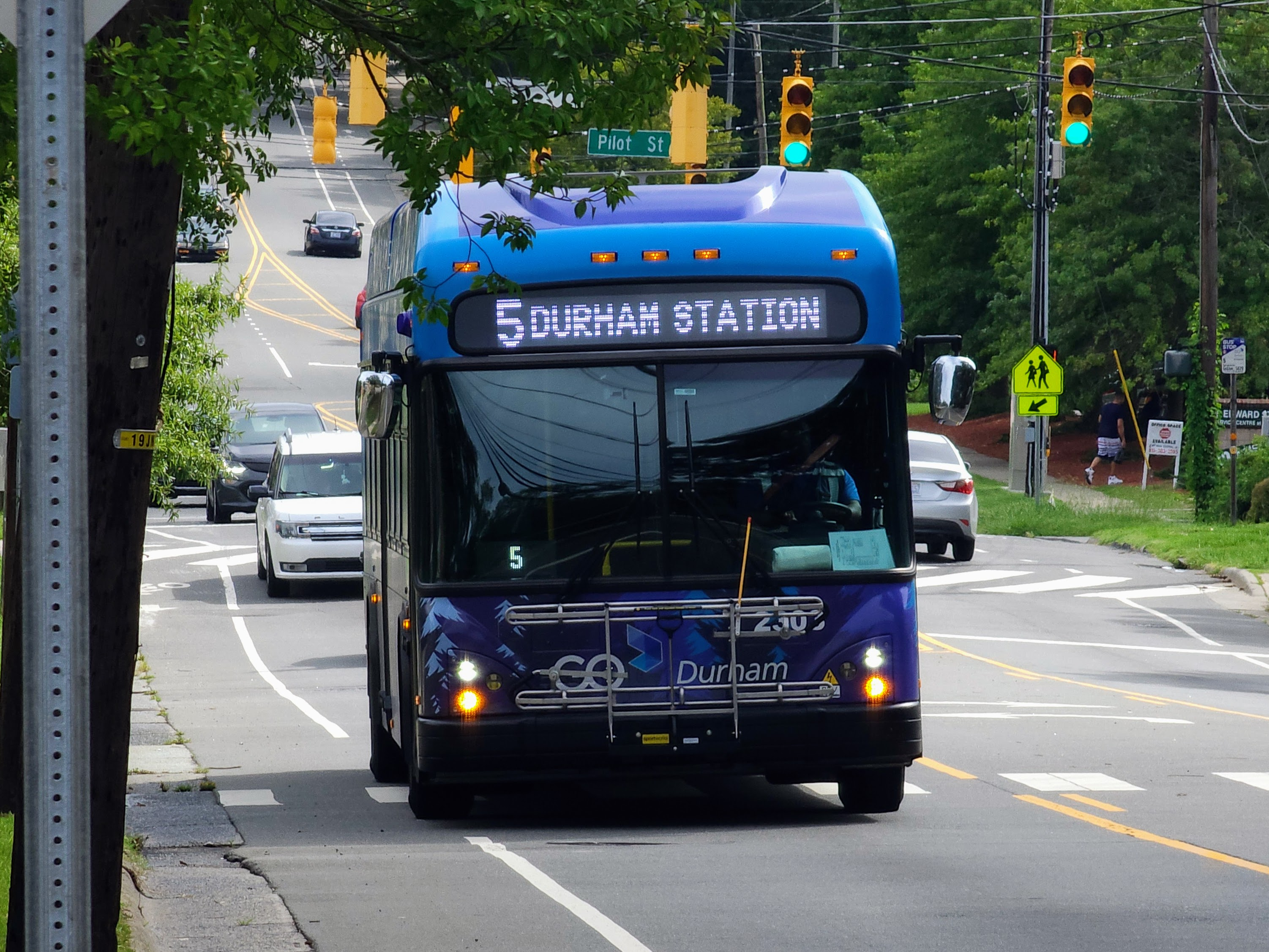
RATP Dev manages many networks across the US including for example the GoDurham in North Carolina.

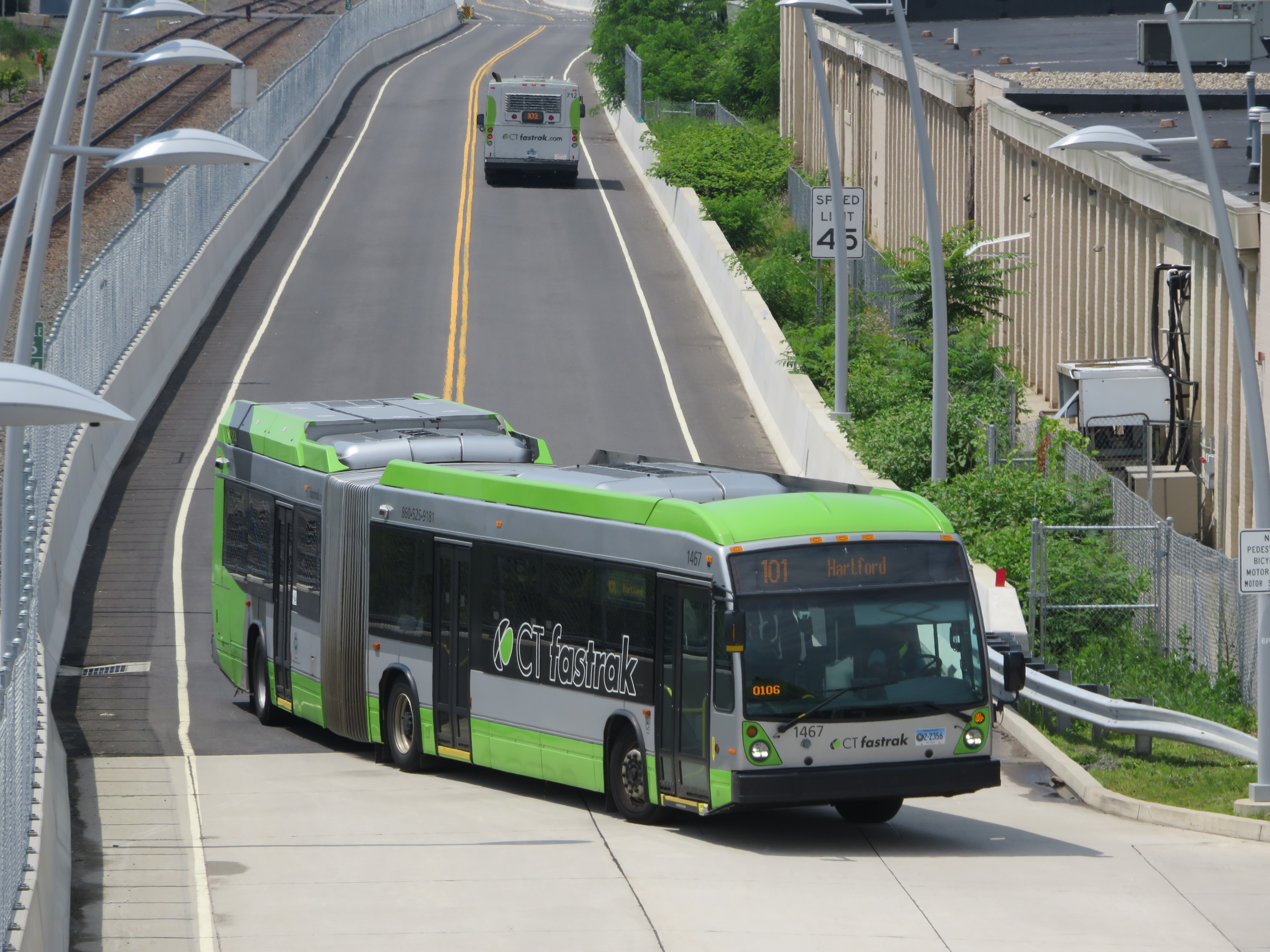
RATP Dev USA operates across the country, including CT Fastrak, a bus rapid transit system in Connecticut.

RATP operates various transit systems in the United States through its American entity, RATP Dev USA:

- Arlington Entertainment Area Management District Trolley, Arlington, Texas
- Asheville Rides Transit (ART), North Carolina (since 2017)
- Bloomington Transit, Indiana
- Bowling Green, Kentucky (since 2020)
- Mountain Mobility, Buncombe County, North Carolina (paratransit, since 2011, renewed in 2020)
- Camarillo Area Transit, California (since 2018)
- Citibus, Lubbock, Texas
- Citylink Edmond, Oklahoma (since 2014)
- City of Lompoc Transit, California (since 2018)
- City of Ocala SunTran, Marion County, Florida
- The COMET, South Carolina (since 2020)
- Hartford, New Haven, and Stamford Divisions of CTtransit, Connecticut (management contract since 2023)
- GoDurham, Durham, North Carolina (since 2023)
- GoRaleigh and GoRaleigh Access, Raleigh, North Carolina (since 2023)
- Greensboro Transit Authority, Greensboro, North Carolina (since 2022)
- IndyGo, Indianapolis, Indiana (paratransit only, since 2021)
- LakeXpress, Lake County, Florida (seven fixed routes, paratransit and 54 vehicles, management contract since 2017)
- Lextran Wheels Paratransit, Lexington, Kentucky (since 2022)
- Oxford-University Transit, Oxford, Mississippi
- Memphis Area Transit Authority, Memphis, Tennessee (since 2021)
- Needles Area Transit, California
- Santa Maria Regional Transit (SMRT), Santa Maria, California, U.S. (management contract since 2018)
- THE Bus, Hernando County, Florida
- TheBus, Prince George's County, Maryland (since 2020)
- VCTC Intercity, California (since 2018)
- Visalia Transit, Visalia, California (since 2024)
- Votran, Volusia County, Florida (until 2020 and again since 2025)
- Wake County, North Carolina (since 2023)
- Waco Transit System, Waco, Texas
- Yuma County Area Transit, Yuma, Arizona (since 2018)
- Winston-Salem Transit Authority, Winston-Salem, North Carolina (since 2024)
- Zion National Park, Utah, shuttle system (since 2000, renewed in 2020)

===== Saudi Arabia =====
- All of Riyadh's urban bus network which will progressively grow to about 100 lines and 1,000 vehicles over three depots. RATP Dev and its Saudi Arabian partner SAPTCO have established the network since 2014 and launched revenue service in March 2023
- Autonomous shuttles in Al-'Ula, on behalf of the Royal Commission for Al-'Ula (since 2022)

===== Switzerland =====
- HelveCié, operating various school, shuttle and coach services in the cantons of Fribourg, Geneva, Neuchâtel and Vaud
- Various bus and coach services as subcontractor to Geneva's transit operator TPG
- Cross-border services between Switzerland and France including services connecting Annecy, Thonon-les-Bains et de Sallanches with Geneva Airport

==== Tootbus ====
RATP Dev operates hop-on hop-off tours using double-decker buses under the Tootbus brand in several cities:

- Tootbus Paris (formerly "Paris L'OpenTour")
- Tootbus Brussels (since November 2021 with up to 12 fully battery-electric vehicles, as part of an eight-year concession granted by STIB)

==== Other ====
Since 2013, RATP Dev, in a consortium with TPG and Pomagalski, manages the Salève cable car, in the French Alps. Ridership of the cable car has increased by 50% since 2013, notably after the introduction of shuttle buses from Annemasse and Saint-Julien-en-Genevois. The contract of the RATP Dev-led consortium has been renewed in 2019 for 12 additional years, until 2031.

In September 2020, RATP Dev announces a partnership with Getlink to jointly bid under the "Régionéo" brand name for regional rail services in France which will gradually opened to competitive tendering. Ultimately, this partnership would not succeed, and RATP Dev wins its first contract in French regional rail, in Normandy, in 2025, acting alone without any partners.

In February 2023, Sepulveda Transit Corridor Partners (STCP), one of the two private sector teams executing the project development agreement with the Los Angeles County Metropolitan Transportation Authority for the future Sepulveda Transit Corridor, announced to have selected RATP Dev as its operations and maintenance partner.

In October 2024, RATP Dev and the East Japan Railway Company announce their association to jointly bid for operations and maintenance of the North–South Commuter Railway (NSCR), in the Philippines.

=== Former operations ===
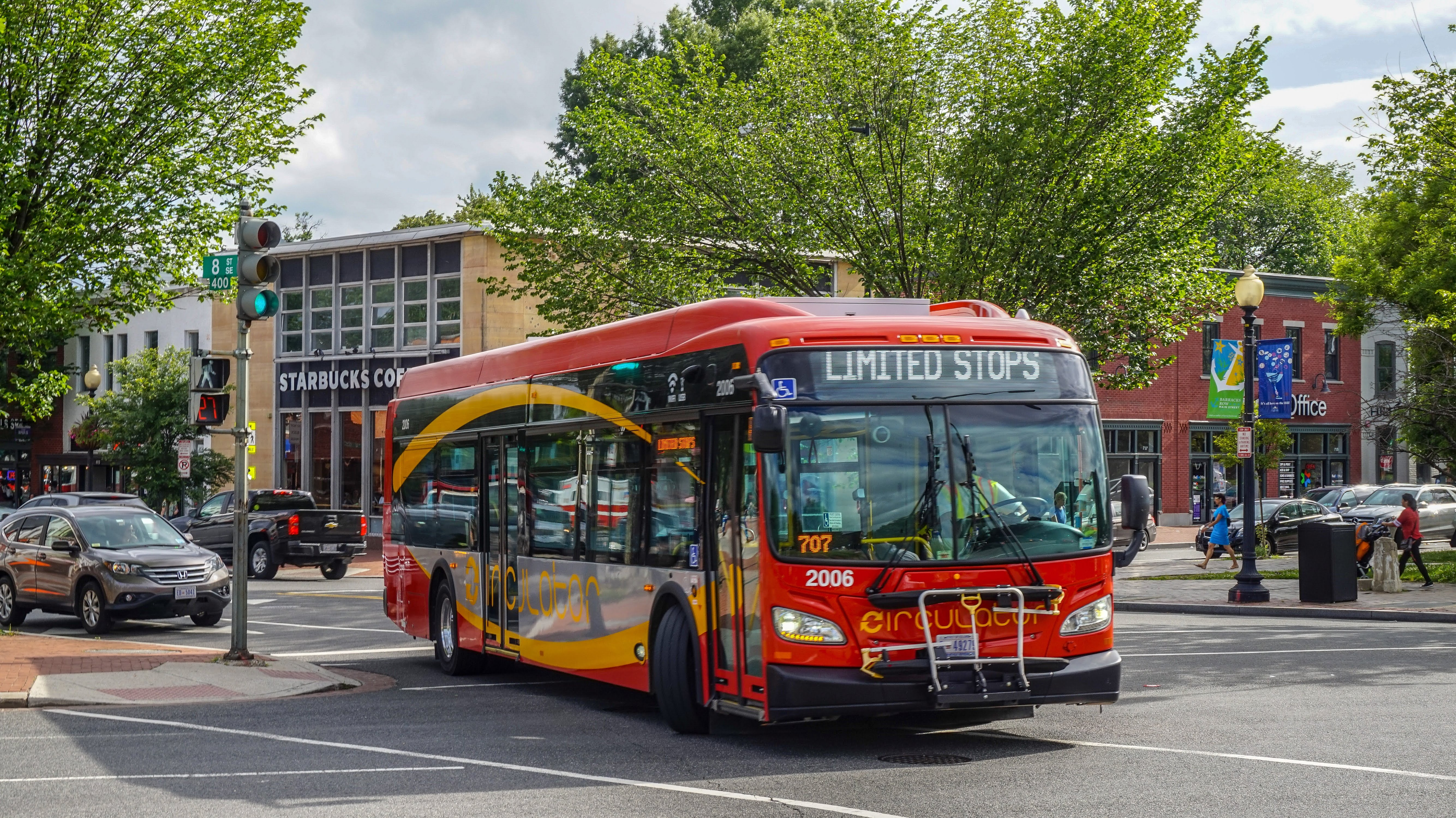
RATP Dev was in charge of the DC Circulator network until its closure at the end of 2024.

(selection / non comprehensive list)

- Algiers Metro (from 1 November 2011 to 31 October 2020)
- The entirey of Algerian tramway networks in the cities of Algiers (2012-2023), Oran (2013-2023), Constantine (2013-2023), Sidi Bel Abbès (2017-2023), Ouargla (2018-2023) and Sétif (2018-2023)
- São Paulo Metro Line 4: technical assistance for start-up and the launch of commercial operations in 2010 and 1% share in the concessionnaire ViaQuatro until 2015
- Rio de Janeiro Light Rail: technical assistance for start-up and the launch of commercial operations in 2016
- Anqing Zhongbei buses in Anqing, China (as part of RDTA from 2008 to ?)
- Shenyang trams (as part of RDTA from 2013 to ?)
- Line 9 of the Seoul Metropolitan Subway (as part of RDTA from 2009 to 2019)
- Line 1 of the Mumbai Metro (as part of RDTA from 2014 to 2019)
- Aléo, the urban bus network of Moulins in the Allier department (from 2012 to 2019)
- STI Allier et STI Nièvre, France (ceased to Prêt à Partir in 2018)
- The Transvilles multimodal network in and around Valenciennes, including the Valenciennes tramway (from 2015 to the end of 2022)
- Manchester Metrolink (from August 2011 to July 2017)
- Selwyns Travel: coach operator with 92 vehicles based in Manchester, Runcorn and St Helens, England (acquired in 2013 and sold in 2020).
- "Slide", an on-demand shared transport / microtransit service targeting commuters in Bristol, England (from July 2016 to December 2018, in partnership with French start-up Padam)
- "Slide Ealing" in London (from November 2019 to mid-2020, in partnership with MOIA)
- Yellow Buses, a bus operator in Bournemouth, England (from 2011 to July 2019).
- "Air Decker", a deregulated bus service connecting Bristol Airport with Bath (from 2011 to its sale (as part of Tootbus Bath) in December 2025).
- Tootbus Bath (formerly Bath Bus Company, in several UK cities (Bath, Bristol, Cardiff), sold in December 2025)
- Tootbus London (formerly The Original Tour, acquired in September 2014 and sold in December 2025)
- DC Circulator, Washington, D.C. (from 2018 to the end of 2024)
- Fullington Auto Bus Company, State College, Pennsylvania, U.S.: acquired in 2009 and sold in 2017
- Open Loop New York: hop on hop off tour company in New York City commenced in May 2014, ceded to Big Bus Tours in 2017
- Capital MetroBus in Austin, Texas: 79 routes, 250 buses, 21 million passengers/year, from 2012 to early 2020.
- Augusta, Georgia (from 2013 to 2025)
- Mountain Metropolitan Transit, Colorado Springs, Colorado (until early 2023)
- DC Streetcar, Washington, D.C., United States (from 2016 to 2026)
