= Yapı Merkezi =

Turkish construction company

Yapı Merkezi Holding A.Ş.
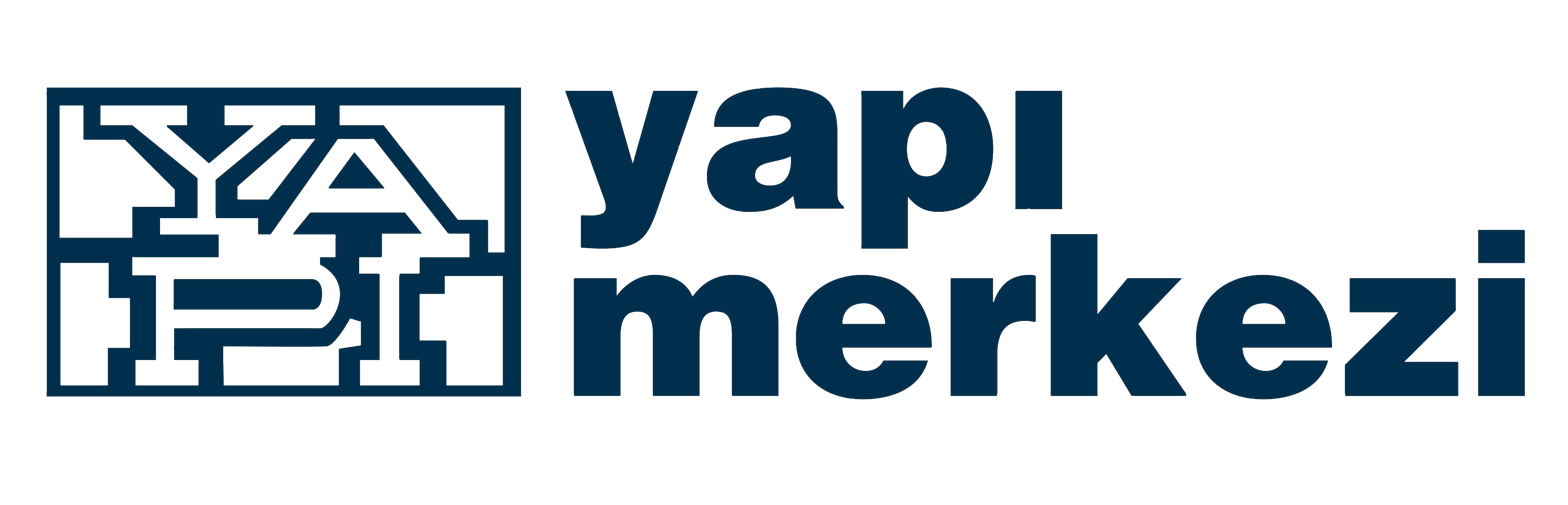
- Type: Private
- Industry: Construction, all major sub branches of engineering in contracting and consulting.
- Founded: 1965; 61 years ago
- Headquarters: Istanbul, Turkey
- Key people: Ersin Arıoglu (Corporate Founder, YM Holding Chairman); Köksal Anadol (Corporate Founder, YM Construction Vice Chairman); Emre Aykar (YM Construction Chairman); Basar Arıoğlu (YM Construction Board Member); Erdem Arıoğlu (YM Construction Board Member); Özge Arıoğlu (YM Construction CEO)
- Revenue: 1.68 billion US$ (2022)
- Website: http://www.ym.com.tr

Yapı Merkezi Holding A.Ş. is a Turkish group company whose field of activity is primarily in the construction industry. It was founded in 1965 by Ersin Arıoğlu and Köksal Anadol in Istanbul. As the first and largest company of the Yapı Merkezi Group, Yapı Merkezi Construction and Industry has realized the design and construction of a wide variety of buildings, rail systems and heavy construction projects. Since 1980, the company has also realized contracts in countries such as Saudi Arabia, Algeria, Morocco, the United Arab Emirates, Sudan, Ethiopia, Tanzania and Slovenia.

The company, which takes the lead in the projects tendered with the "build-operate-transfer" model, has so far received 243 billion 909 million 543 thousand liras worth of public tenders.

== Activities ==
Through its specialized companies, Yapı Merkezi has realized national and international projects within the fields of transportation systems, rail systems, tunnels, bridges, viaducts, industrial and general service buildings, mass housing and city planning, water collection and supply systems, restoration, strengthening, and repair works.

== Group companies ==
Yapı Merkezi Prefabrication was established in 1978. It was the first company in its field to obtain the ISO 9001 Quality Assurance certificate in Turkey. In 1987, Yapı Merkezi founded Freysaş in partnership with Freyssinet International. Since then, Freysaş has realized projects featuring advanced construction technologies such as cable stay systems, post-tensioning, heavy lifting and ground anchorage. Yapıkonut joined the group in 1994 and accomplished projects such as Çamkonaklar, Sokullu Estates, NP12 Estates, Sisli Plaza and the Arkeon Housing Complex. In 1995, qualified Education Institutions Inc. was founded and Irmak Schools was opened. In 1996, the group introduced SUBOR Pipe Industry Inc. to manufacture high-end technology composite construction materials.

== Experience in rail systems ==
Yapıray joined the group in 1995 to take advantage of the group company’s experience in the rail systems field, considering the increasing demand for urban and intercity railway transport. Yapıray provides design, development and operation services for railway systems.

Today, most of Istanbul’s operating rail systems have been constructed by Yapı Merkezi. Dubai Metro, Ankara-Konya High-Speed Railway, Casablanca Tramway, the Birtouta-Zéralda railway in Algeria, Medina High-Speed Train Station, Izmir Metro, Eskişehir Tram, Kayseray (Kayseri Light Rail System), Taksim-Kabataş Funicular System and Antalya Tram are other examples of Yapı Merkezi’s turn-key projects.

The 2004 UITP (International Association for Public Transport) “Light Rail Project of the Year” award was given to Estram (Eskişehir LRTS), UITP “2010 Best Urban Integration Project of the Year” and British Light Transit Association’s “Worldwide Project of the Year” awards were given Kayseray (Kayseri Light Rail System). Both tramway systems were constructed by Yapı Merkezi as a turnkey project.

In 2012, Yapı Merkezi Holding established Yapı Merkezi IDIS Engineering as its technology company and developed a signaling system which is certified as SIL 4 with its safety culture in railway. Yapı Merkezi IDIS works on railway signaling and telecommunications systems. Additionally, the company provides engineering services for electromechanical systems on railways, land routes and tunnels. IDIS works as a design, applications and systems supplier. R&D in transportation technology, signaling and structural health monitoring are also part of the group's services.

== Main works ==
=== Buildings ===
- Marmara Forum Shopping Center
- Şişli Plaza
- ANKAmall Shopping Center
- 212 Shopping Center
- Sudan Wahat Al Khartoum Shopping Center
- Yedpa Trade Center
- Novartis Pharmaceuticals Plant
- Roche Pharmaceuticals Plant
- Frito-Lay Factory
- Denso Factory
- FMV Işık University Campus
- Arkeon Houses
- Tuscan Valley Houses
- Sokullu Houses
- Club Aquamarine Holliday Village
- Four Seasons at the Bosphorus Hotel
- Haramain High Speed Railway Station in Jeddah

=== Transportation systems ===
- Eurasia Tunnel
- Dubai Metro
- Ankara-Konya High-Speed Railway
- İzmir Metro
- Kabataş-Taksim Funicular
- Kadıköy-Kartal Metro System
- Kayseri Tram (Kayseray)
- Eskişehir Tram
- Bursa Light Rail System
- Casablanca Tram
- Istanbul Metro
- Istanbul Nostalgic Tram
- Antalya Tram
- Istanbul Modern Tram
- Sétif Tramway
- Sidi Bel Abbès Tramway
- Tanzania Standard Gauge Railway
  - Dar es Salaam - Morogoro
  - Morogoro - Makutupora
- Uganda Standard Gauge Railway
  - Malaba - Kampala
- (Ethiopia) Awash-Weldia Railway
- (Slovenia) Divača–Koper Railway

=== Bridges ===
- (Sudan) El Mek Nimr Bridge
- (Sudan) Al Halfaia Bridge
- Söğütlüçeşme and Merter Railway Bridges

=== Restorations ===
- Galata Tower Heritage Restoration Project
- Heritage Restoration Project of the Historical Turkish Bastion, Algeria
- Mostar Bridge Heritage Restoration Project, Bosnia Herzegovina
- Ottoman Imperial Mint Complex Heritage Restoration Project
- Theron Damon Mansions Heritage Restoration Project
- Adile Sultan Palace Heritage Restoration Project
- Heritage Restoration Project of Turkish tombs, Sudan
