= Trams in Bursa =

Tram system in Bursa, Turkey

Bursa tramway network
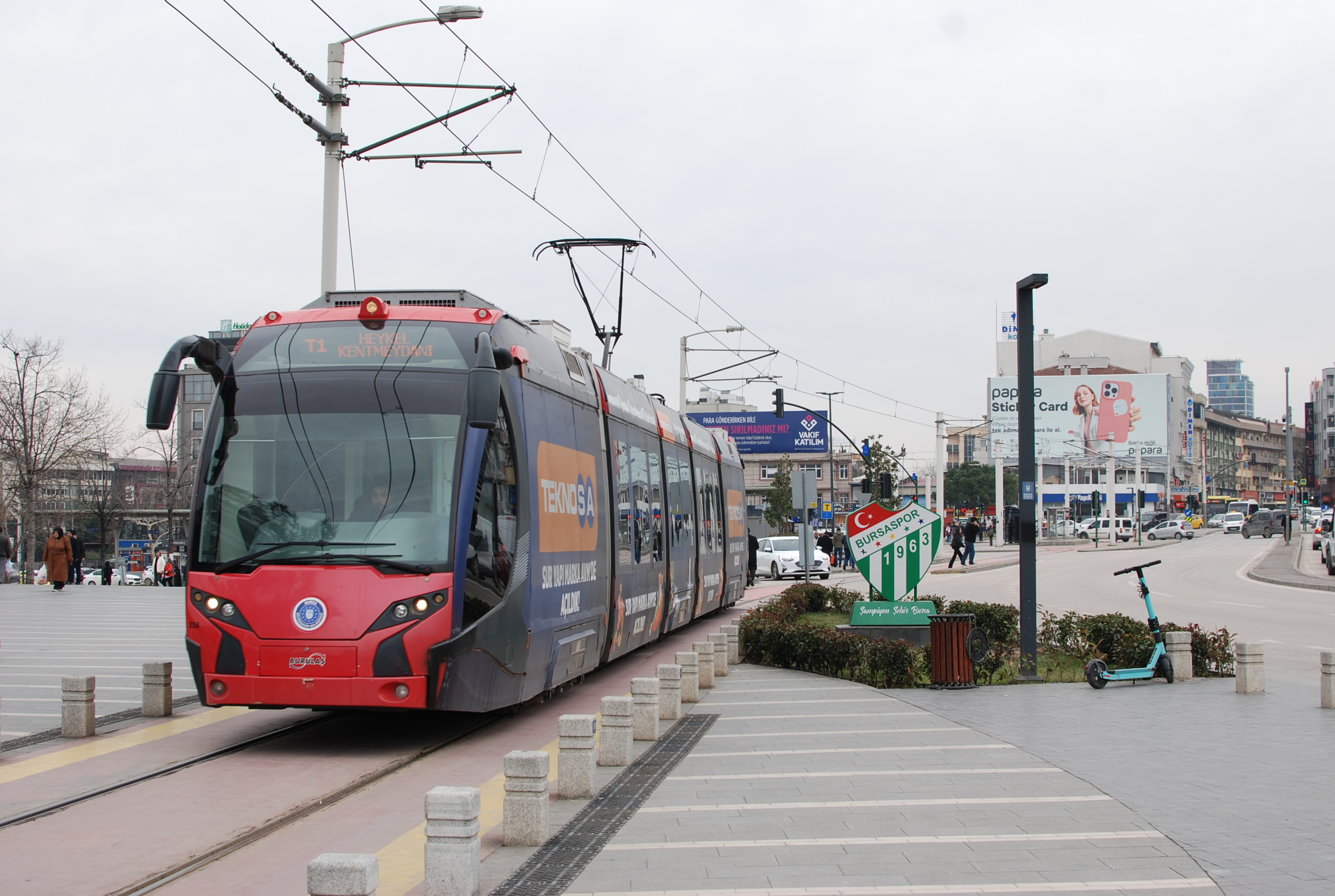

Overview
- Transit type: Tram/Heritage tram
- Number of lines: 3 (T1, T2 & T3)
- Number of stations: T1: 16; T2: 11; T3: 9
- Website: Burtram

Operation
- Began operation: T1: 12 October 2013; T2: 2 July 2022; T3: 28 May 2011
- Operator: Burulaş

Technical
- System length: 18.5 km (11.5 mi) (total); T1: 6.5 km (4.0 mi); T2: 9.5 km (5.9 mi); T3: 2.5 km (1.6 mi)
- Track gauge: 1,435 mm (4 ft 8 1/2 in) (T1, T2); 1,000 mm (3 ft 3 3/8 in) (T3)

The Bursa tram network (also stylized as Burtram) forms part of the public transport system in the city Bursa, Marmara region, Turkey. The tram network is operated by Burulaş, Bursa’s public transport operator. Bursa's tramway is made up of three lines: a metre gauge heritage tramline called T3 that opened first in 2011, a standard gauge modern tramline called T1 that opened in 2013 and a light rail line, T2, that opened in 2022.

== Tram routes ==
The modern tramline, T1, operates in a loop from Stadium to Gazcilar and back. T2 operates between an interchange with T1 at Kent Meydanı (Main Square) and Terminal (Central Coach Station). The heritage tramline, T3, runs from Çinarönü to Zafer Plaza.

=== T1 Line characteristics ===
- Opened: 12 October 2013
- Total length: 6.5 kilometers (4.0 mi)
- Number of stops: 16
- Rail gauge: 1,435 mm (4 ft 8 1/2 in) (standard gauge)
- Operating hours: 7:00 am to 11:00 pm
- Frequency: 8–15 minutes
- Rolling stock: Durmaray Silkworm tram

=== T2 Line characteristics ===
- Opened: 2 July 2022
- Total length: 9.5 kilometers (5.9 mi)
- Number of stops: 11
- Rail gauge: 1,435 mm (4 ft 8 1/2 in) (standard gauge)
- Operating hours: 7:00 am to 11:00 pm
- Frequency: 8–15 minutes
- Rolling stock: Durmaray Silkworm tram

=== T3 Line characteristics ===
- Opened: 28 May 2011
- Total length: 2.5 kilometers (1.6 mi)
- Number of stops: 9
- Rail gauge: 1,000 mm (3 ft 3 3/8 in) (metre gauge)
- Operating hours: 7:00 am to 11:00 pm

== Gallery ==
=== T1 ===
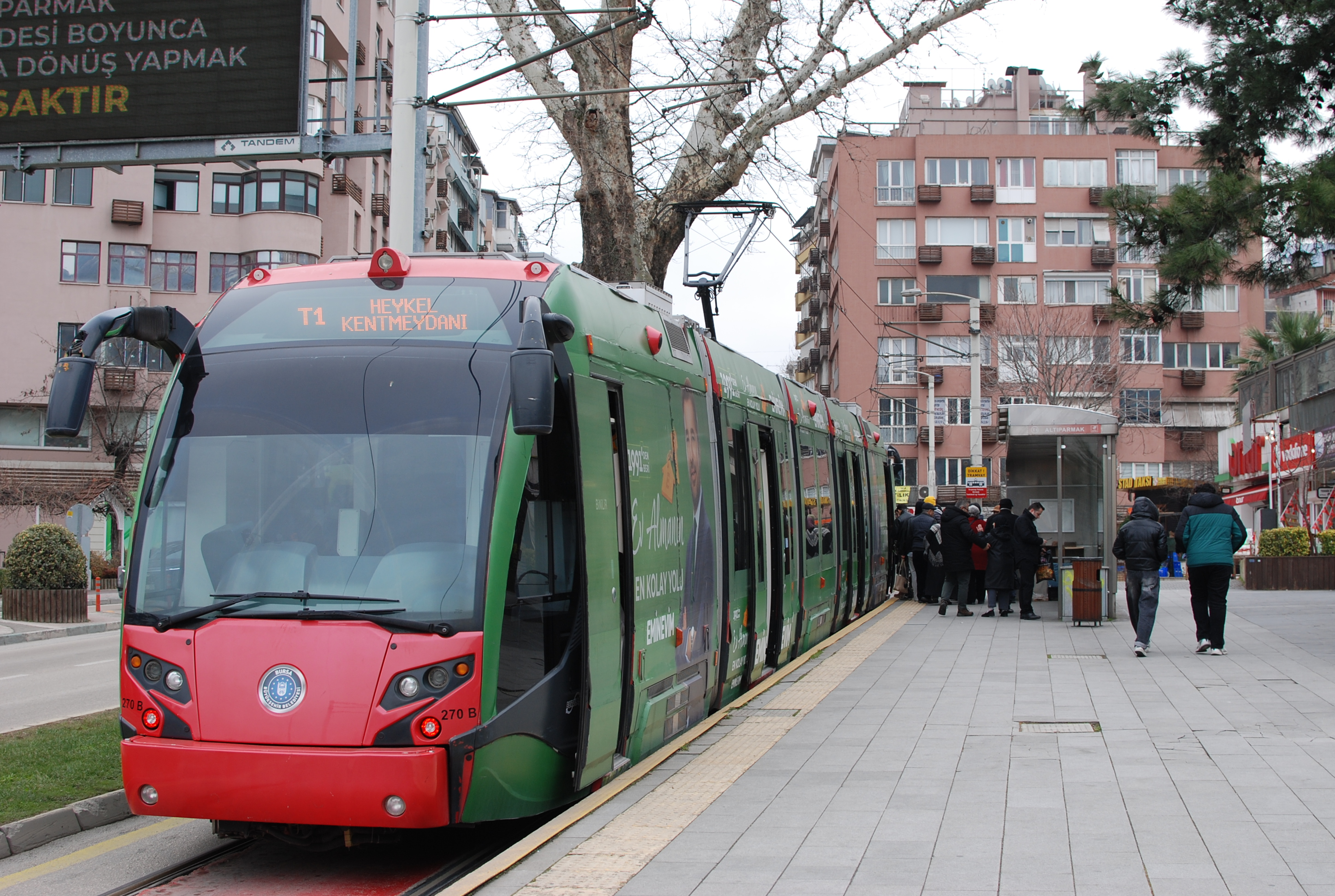

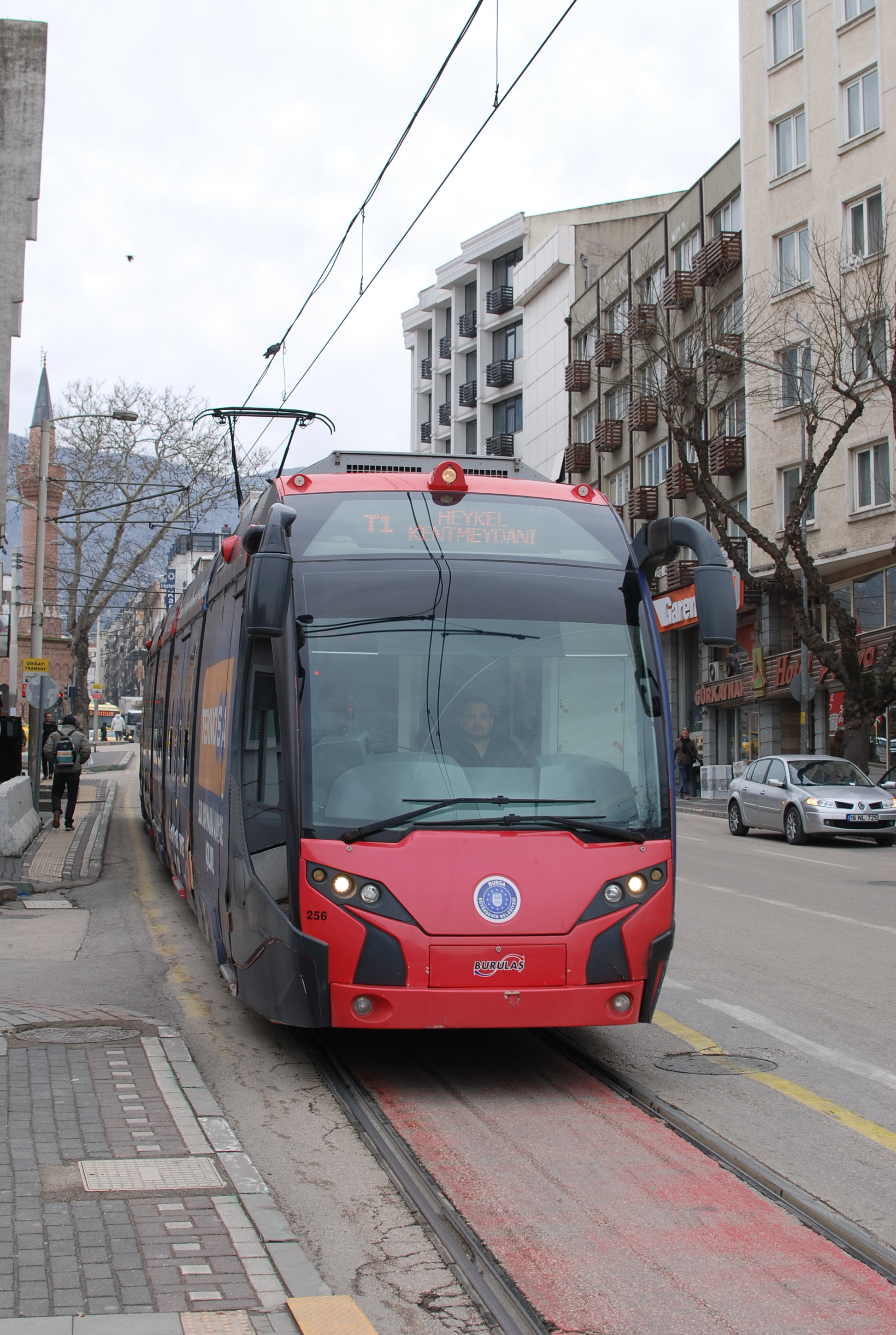

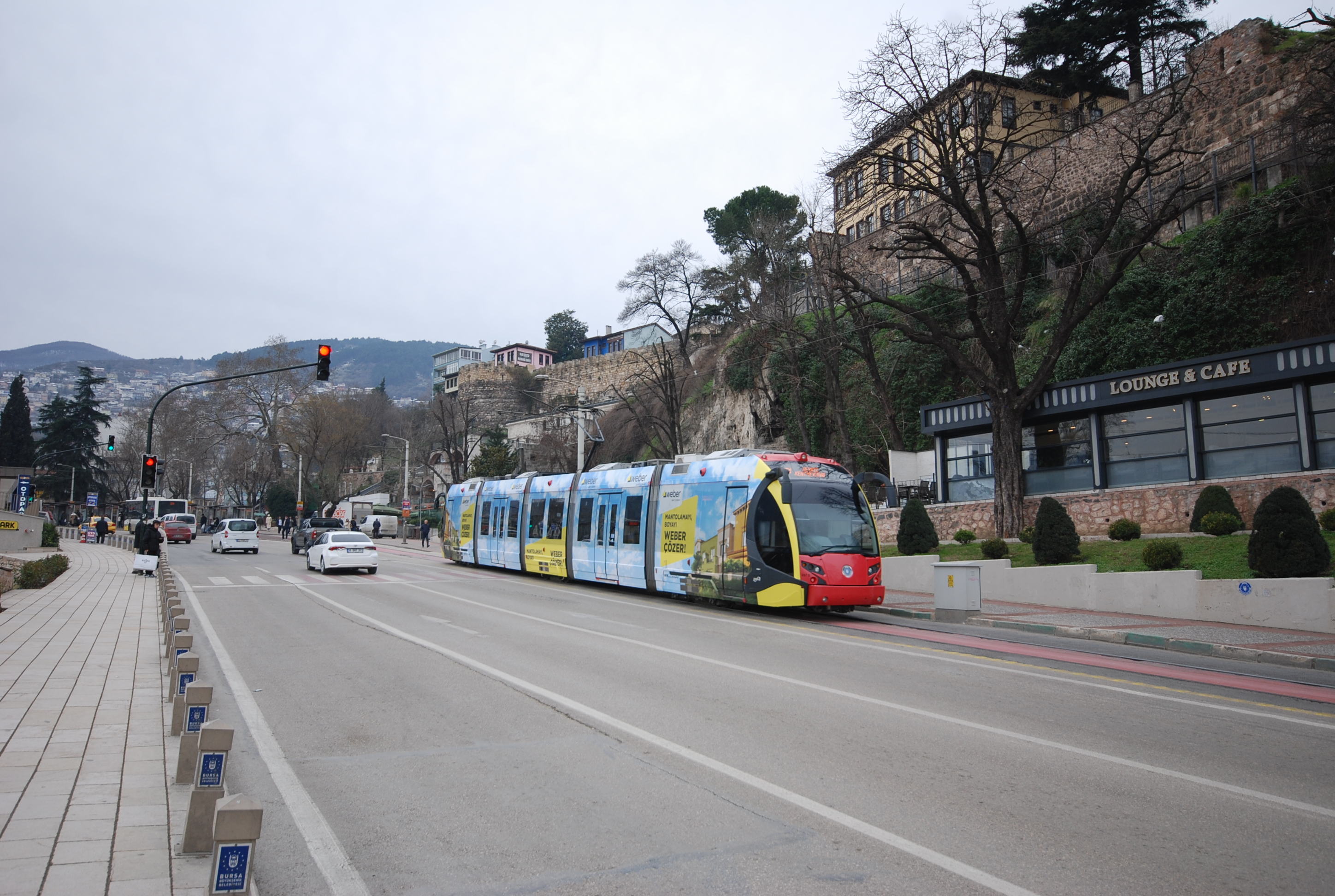

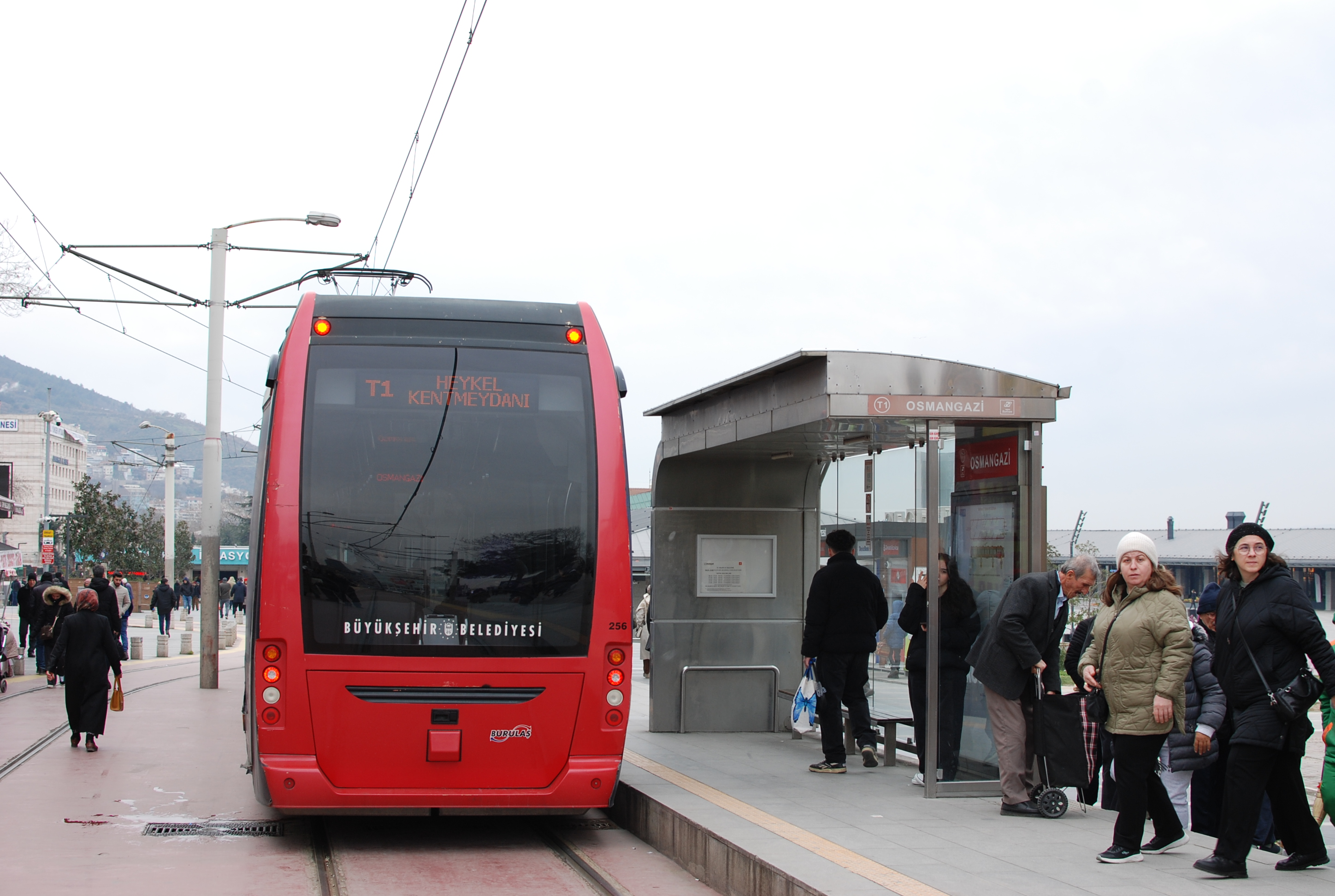

=== T2 ===
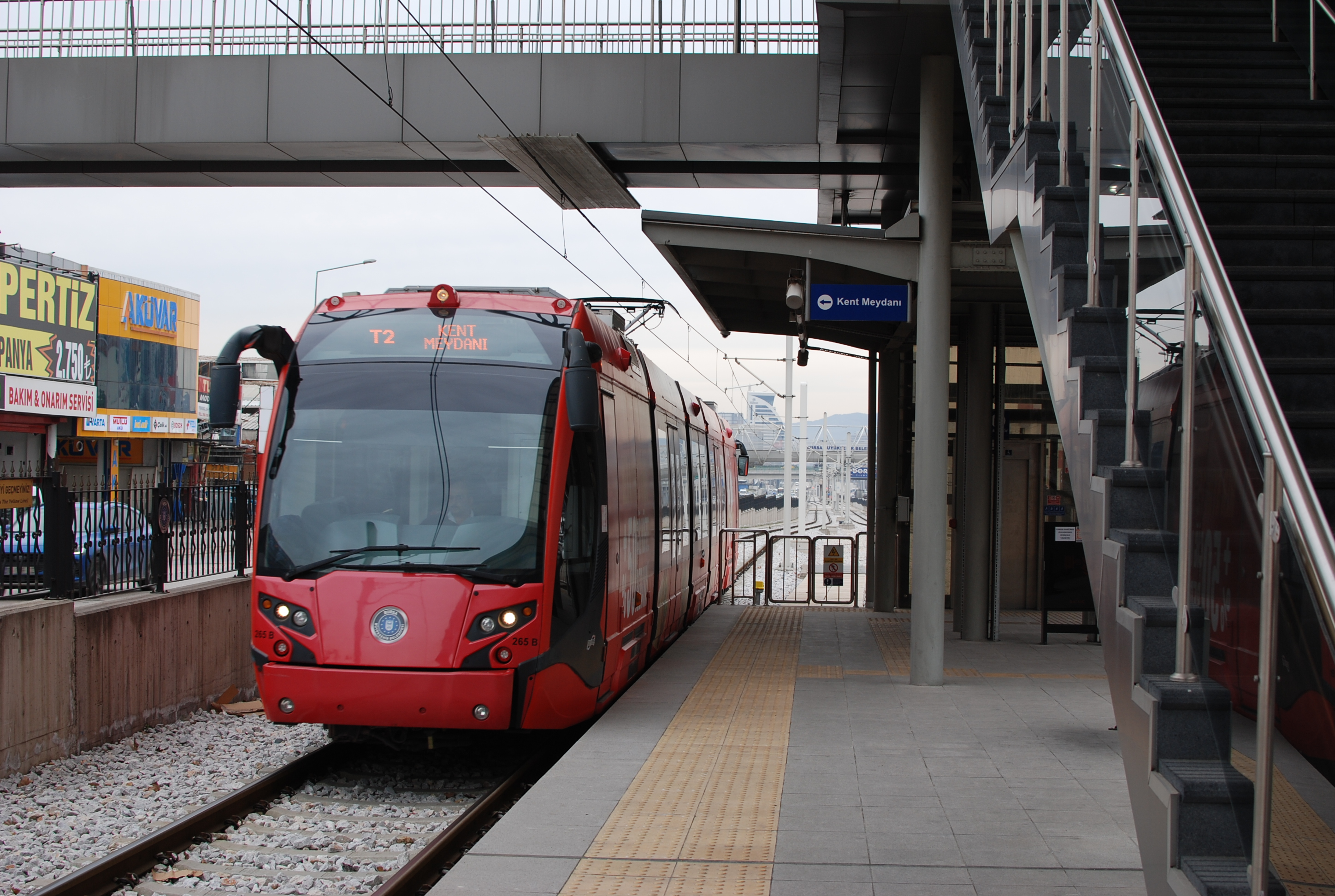

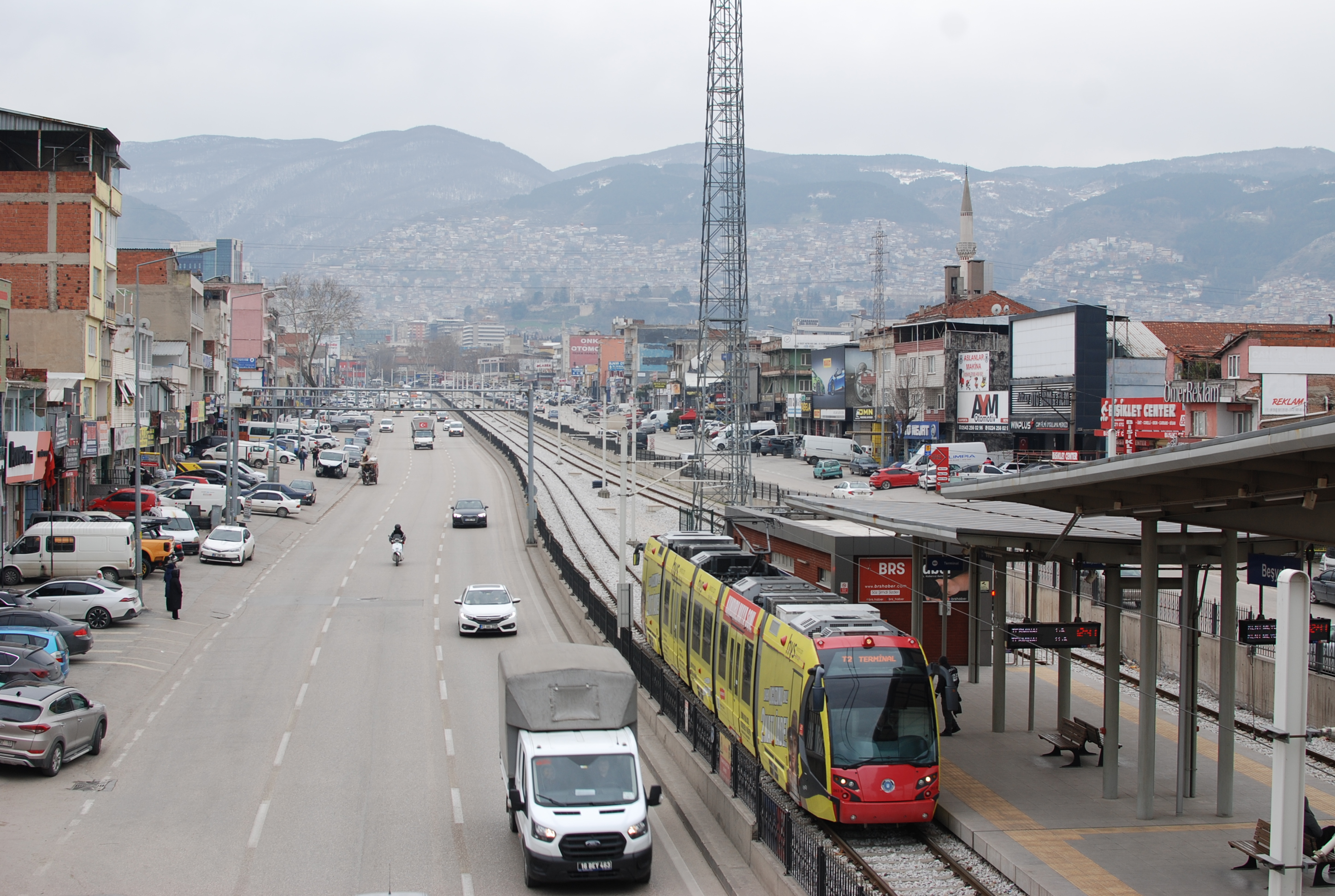

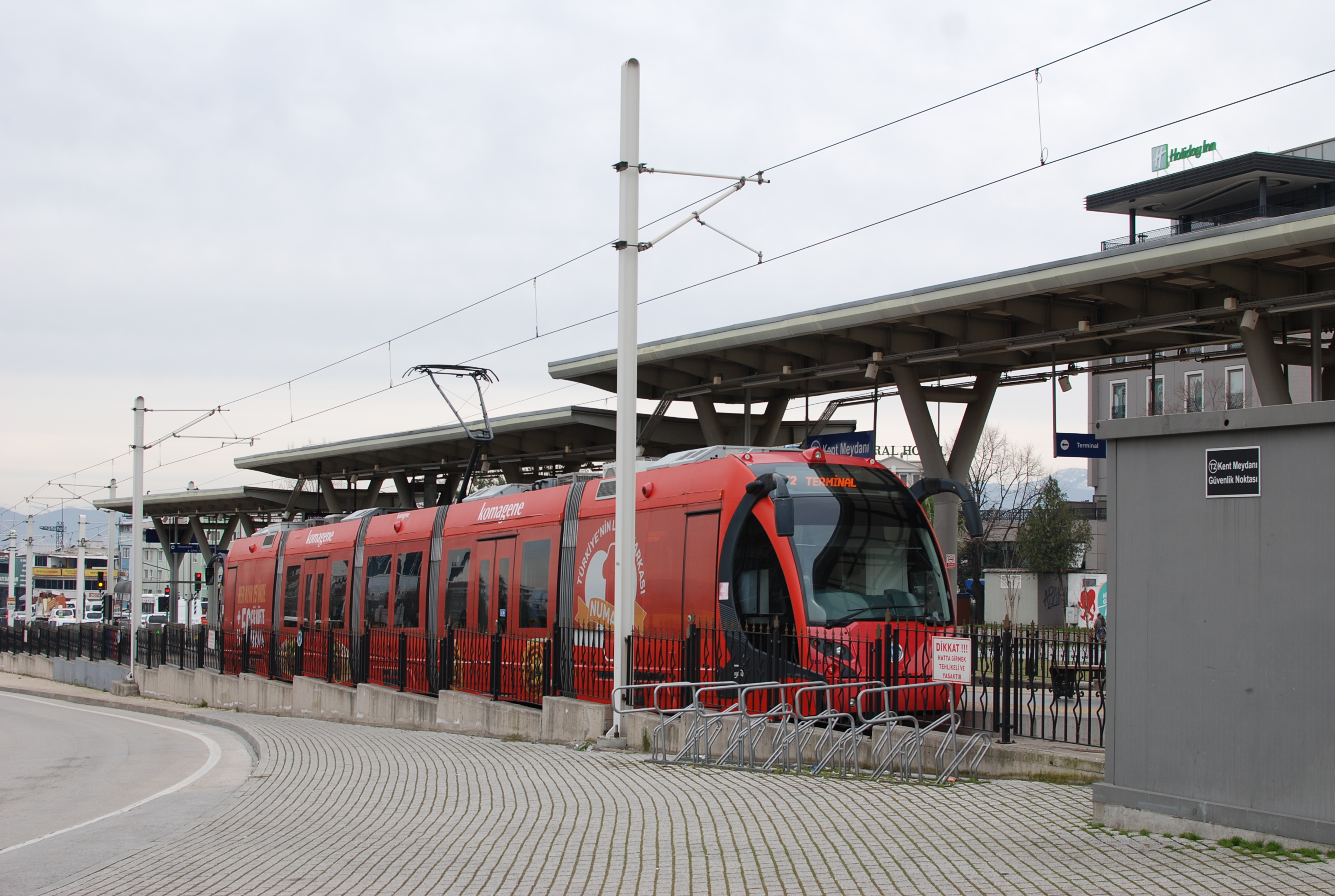

=== T3 ===
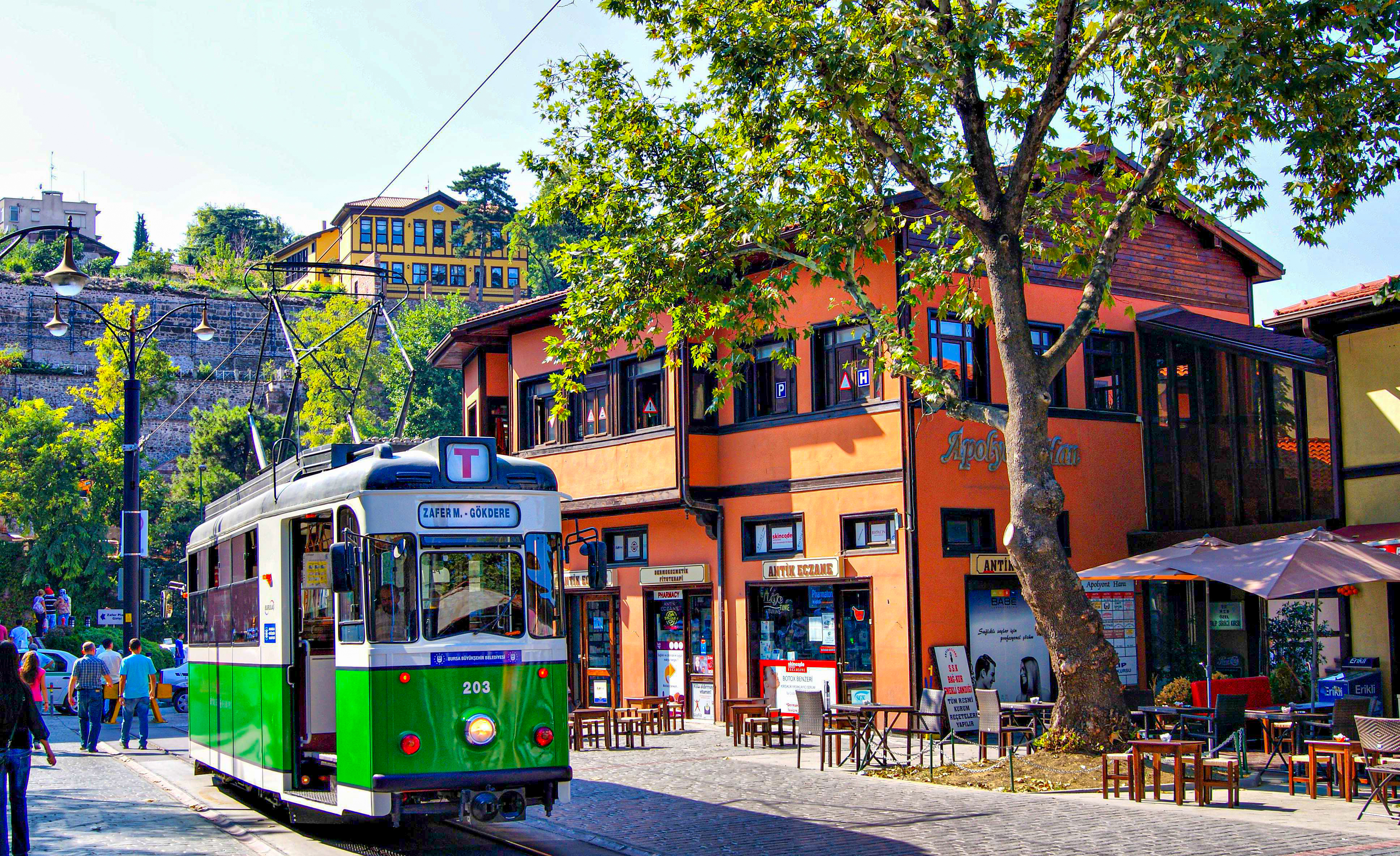

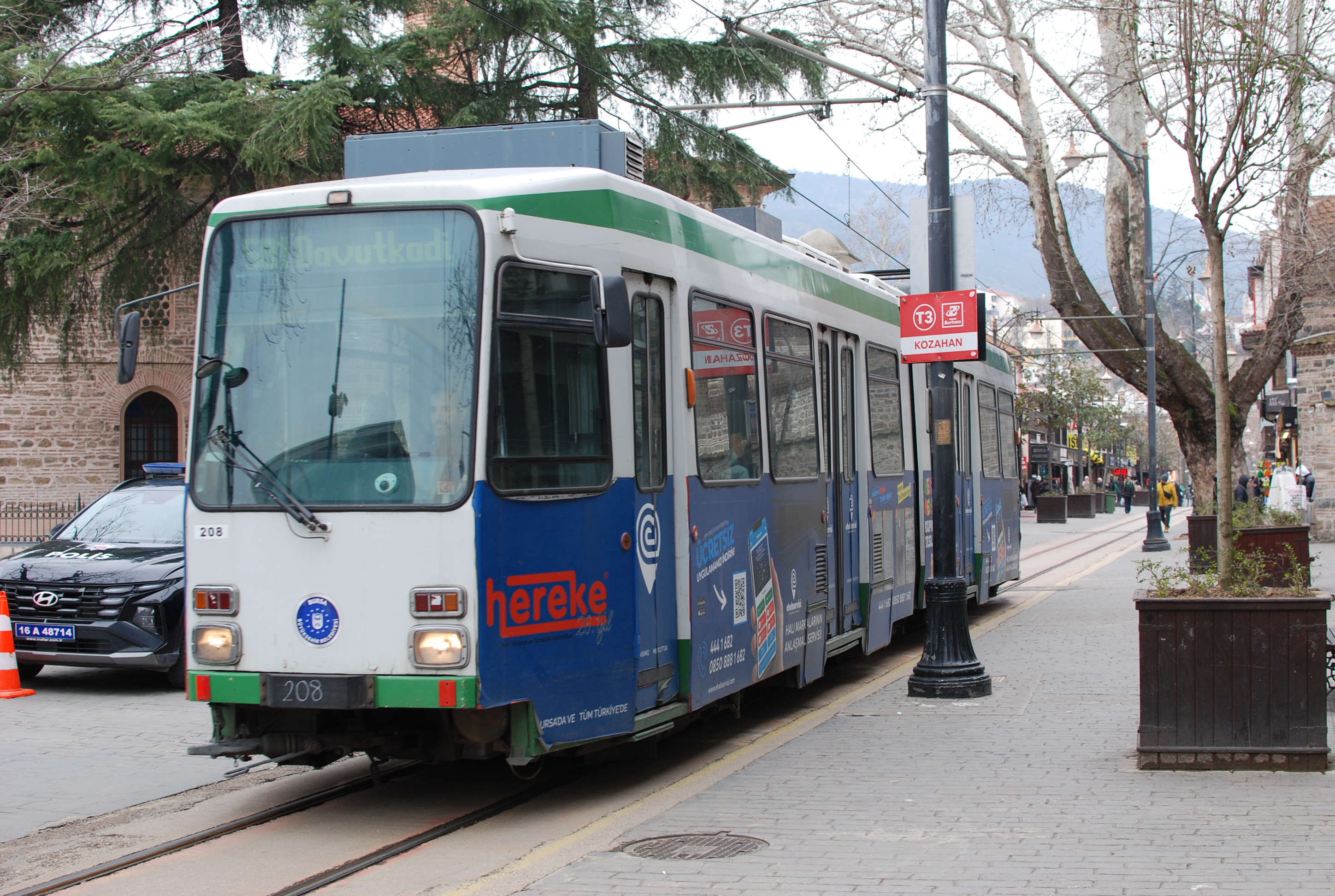

== See also ==
- Bursaray
- List of town tramway systems in Turkey
- List of tram and light rail transit systems
