= Bursaray =

Rapid transit system in Bursa, Turkey

Coordinates: 40°11′N 29°03′E

BursaRay

Overview
- Locale: Bursa, Marmara, Turkey
- Transit type: Light metro
- Number of lines: 2
- Number of stations: 40 (3 under construction)
- Annual ridership: 91.25 million (2010)
- Website: Burulaş - Bursaray

Operation
- Began operation: 24 April 2002; 24 years ago
- Operator: Burulaş
- Number of vehicles: 122 cars (total) (48 Siemens Type B80, 30 Bombardier Flexity Swift, 60 Durmazlar GreenCity

Technical
- System length: 40.0 km (24.9 mi)
- Track gauge: 1,435 mm (4 ft 8 1/2 in) standard gauge
- Electrification: 1,500 V DC
- Average speed: 34 km/h (21 mph); 24 km/h (15 mph) (Line 1 branch)
- Top speed: 70 km/h (43 mph); 50 km/h (31 mph) (Line 1 branch)
System map

Bursaray (sometimes stylized as BursaRay) is a light metro system in the city of Bursa, Marmara Region, Turkey, built in 2000 by TÜVASAŞ, and operated by Burulaş. The name Bursaray is a portmanteau of Bursa, and Ray, the Turkish word for "rail". The Bursaray metro opened for passenger service on 24 April 2002. The metro system presently consists of two lines, which share a main line in the east, and branch into two lines at the western end of the system.

It is planned to expand the Bursaray system to a 50-kilometer (31 mi) network in the future.

== History ==
31 Jan 1997: Bursaray contract signed
14 Oct 1998: construction begins
24 Apr 2002: passenger trial service begins
19 Aug 2002: official opening of first line: Şehreküstü - Küçük Sanayi (Hipodrom)
02 Jan 2005: construction work begins on BursaRay Phase 1 Stage B
06 Apr 2008: extension east from Sehreküstü - Arabayatagi (i.e. BursaRay Phase 1 Stage B enters service)
28 Oct 2008: Phase 2 construction work begins
24 Dec 2010: extension: Phase 2, Küçük Sanayi (Hipodrom) - Özlüce (2.9 km), enters service
19 Sep 2011: extension: Phase 2, Özlüce - Üniversite (3.6 km)
15 Dec 2011: extension: Phase 2, Organize Sanayi (1050 Konutlar) - Emek (2.5 km)
19 Mar 2014: extension: Phase 3, Arabayatağı - Otosansit (4.4 km)
27 Mar 2014: extension: Phase 3, Otosansit - Gürsu (2.0 km)
05 Jun 2014: extension: completion of Phase 3, Gürsu - Kestel (1.5 km)
02 Apr 2021: Construction of the Bursa City Hospital extension begins.
04 Nov 2021: Infill station "Odunluk" between Nilüfer and Acemler was opened.

== Operations ==
The Bursaray system is made up of two lines that operate on 38.9 kilometers (24.2 mi) of route, serving 39 stations (7 of which are underground stations).

Station platforms are 120 meters (393 ft 8 in) long, and 92 centimeters (3 ft 0 in) high; most stations use island platforms.

== Rolling stock ==
A total of 48 cars of the B80 type (27.7-meter (90 ft 11 in) long) were delivered by Siemens Uerdingen (in collaboration with the local company TÜVASAŞ). Siemens TS supplied the signalling automation systems and the power supply system.

Later the fleet was enlarged with 30 Bombardier Flexity Swift light rail cars (similar to those of the type U5-25 on the Frankfurt U-Bahn) from Bombardier. After that, Burulas purchased 44 used 'Sneltram' Duewag SG2 (Duewag T-cars) from the city of Rotterdam; 25 of which were placed in service while the other 19 were used to provide spare parts as needed. All Duewag SG2 cars are discontinued today.

In addition, 60 Durmazlar GreenCity cars are in service.

== Stations ==
There are 39 Metro stations in total in Bursa. (Not counting the tram and bus routes)

== Future expansions ==
In April 2021, the construction of the Bursa city hospital extension began. The extension will run from Emek station to the new city hospital via the future Bursa high speed rail station.

In January 2023, the groundbreaking ceremony of the extension from Uludağ University station to Görükle was held. Despite this, the construction has not yet started.

== Gallery ==
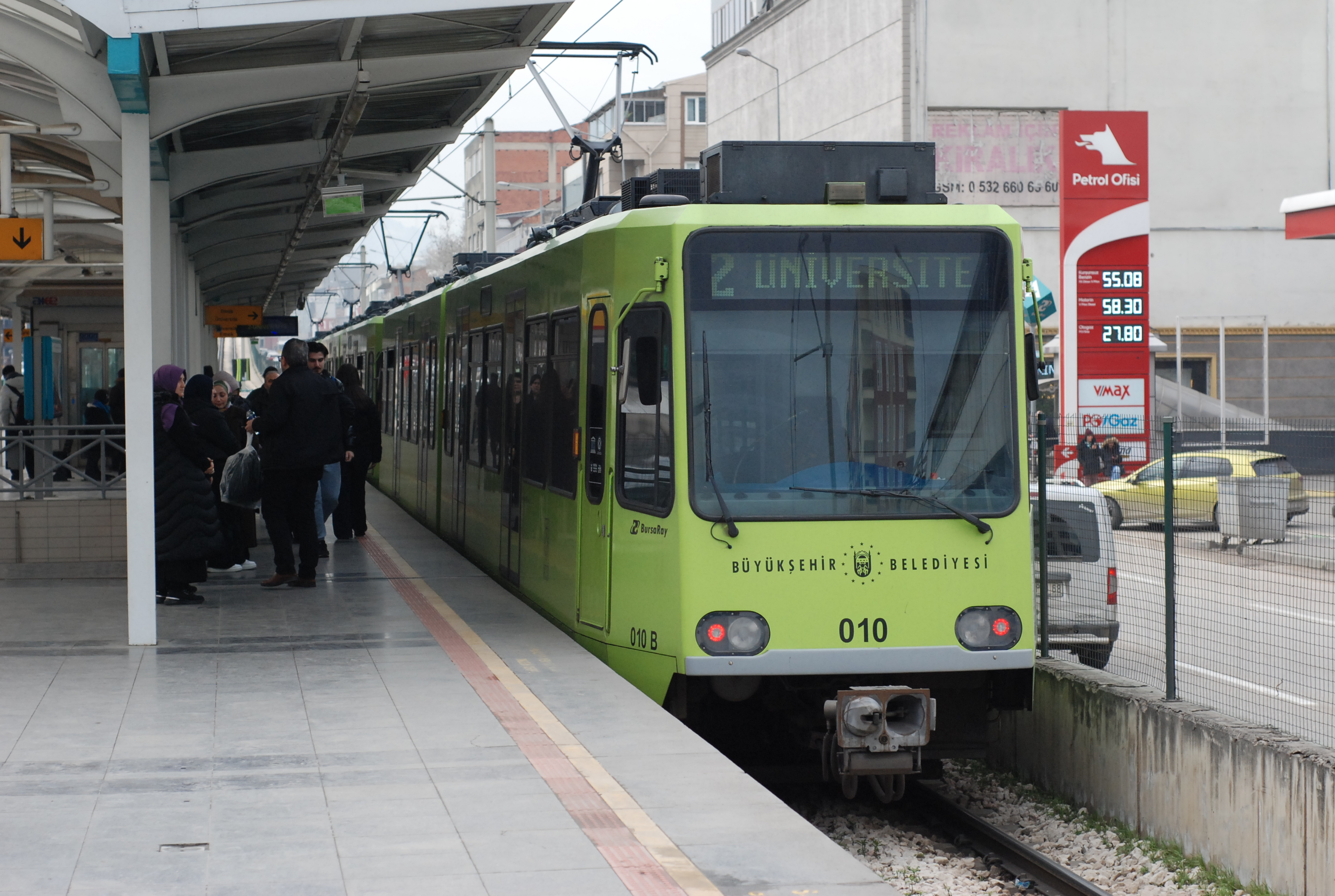

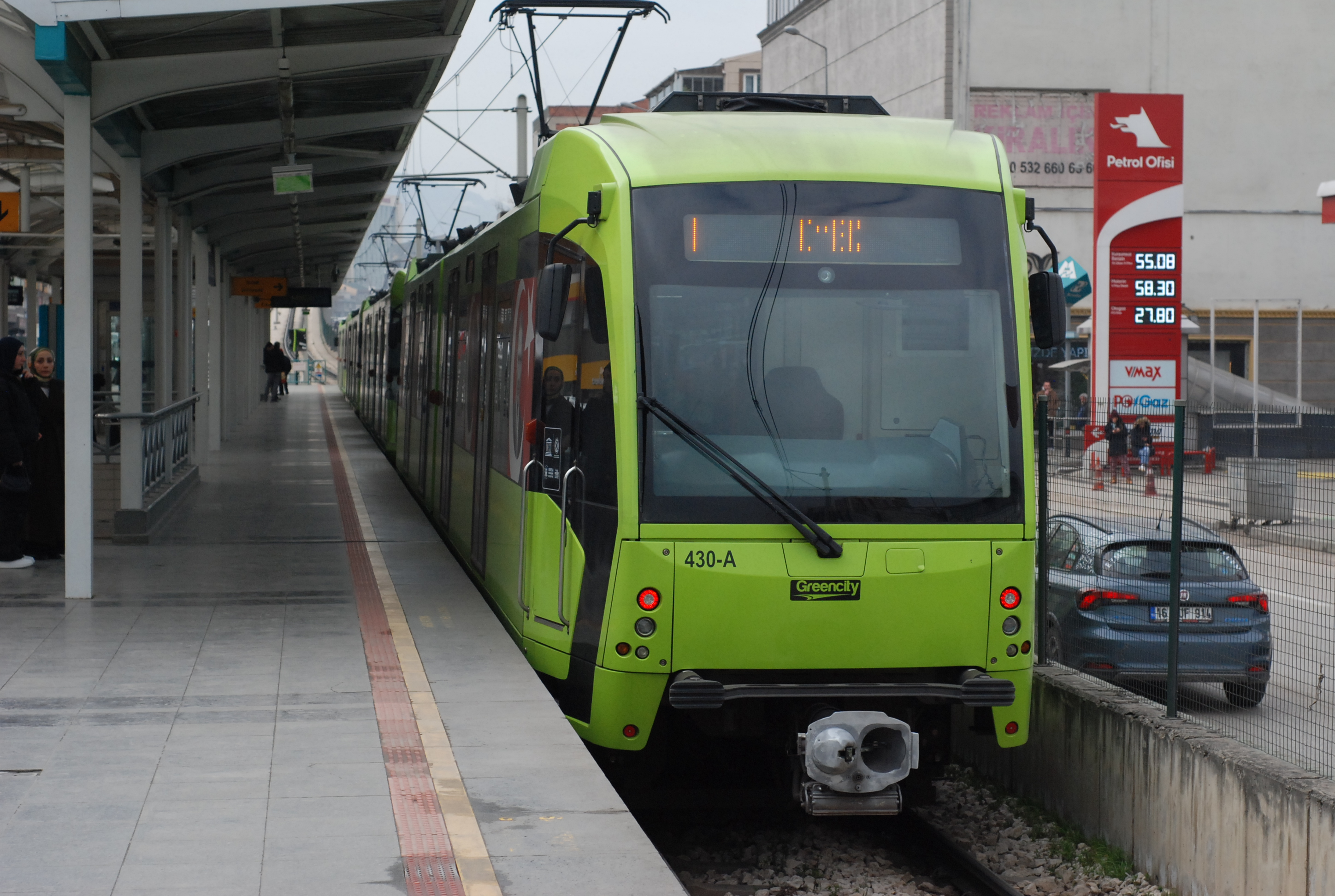

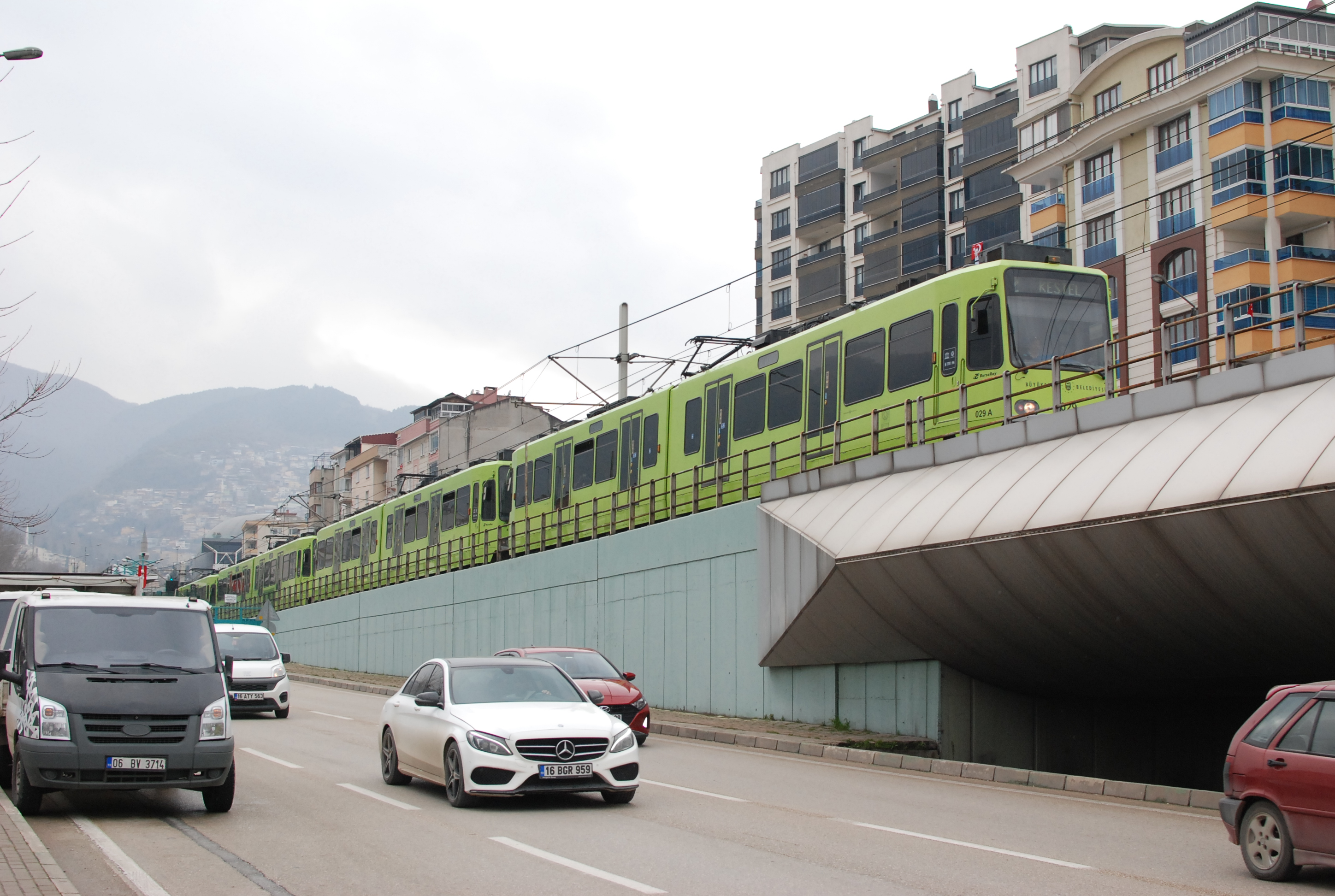

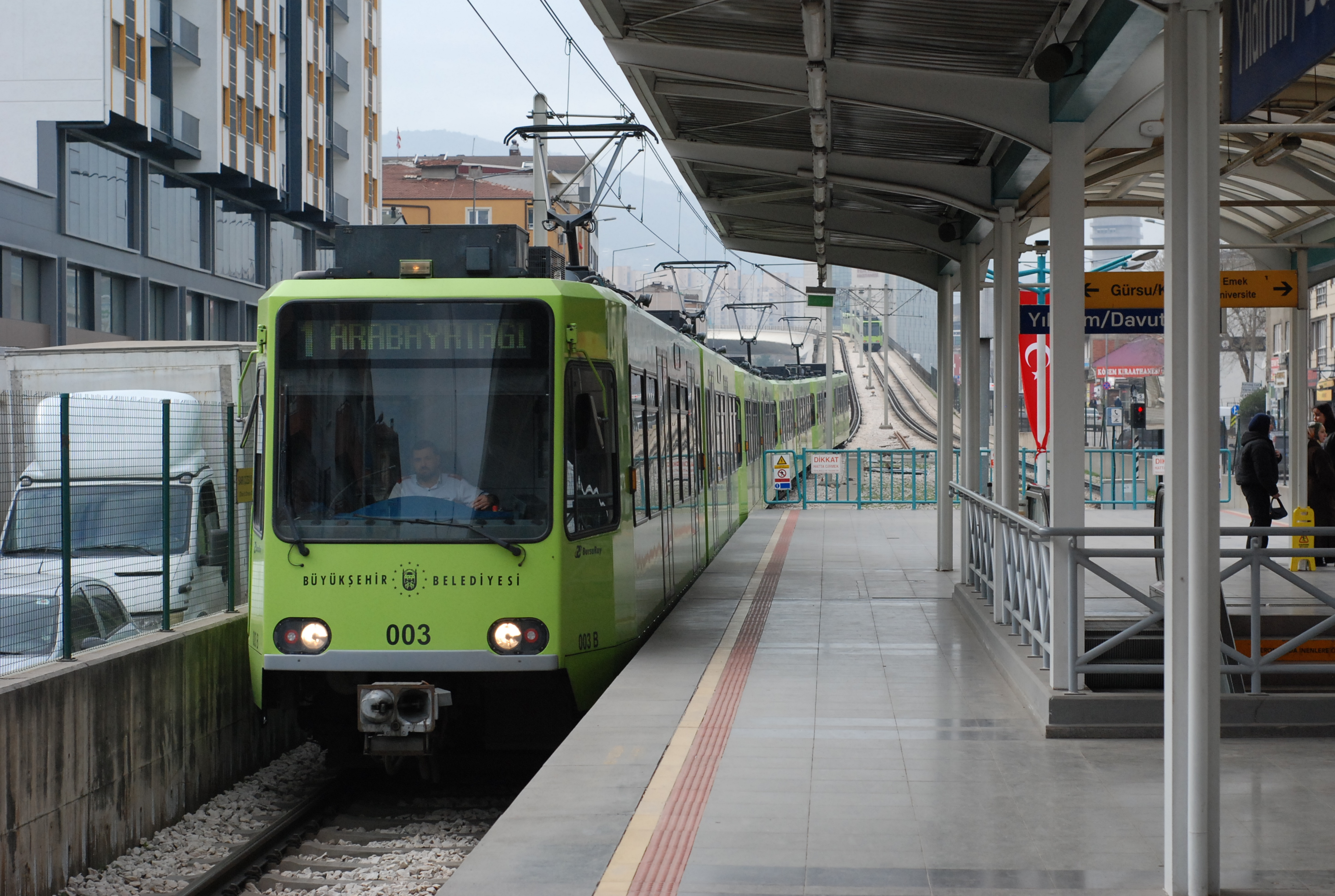

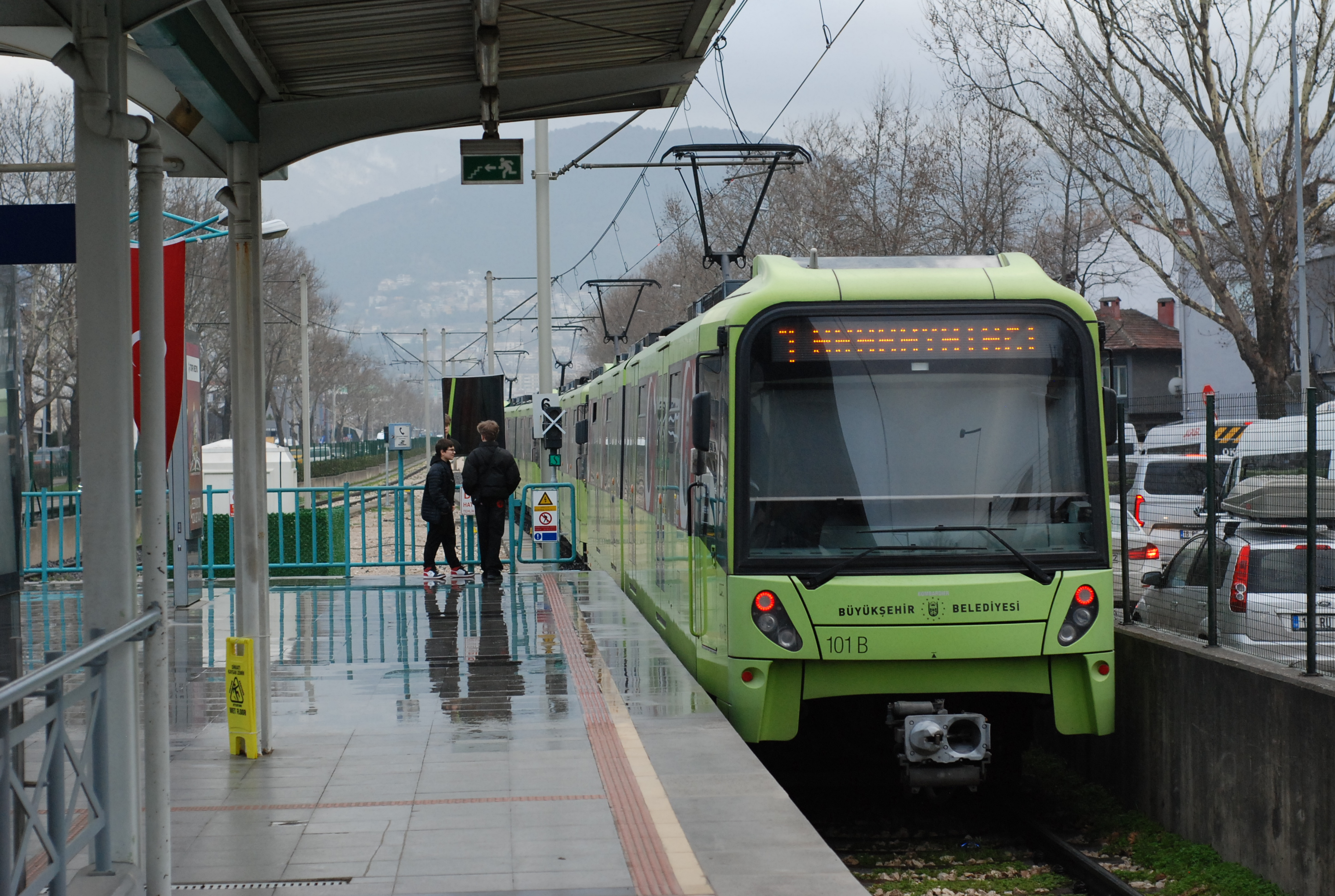

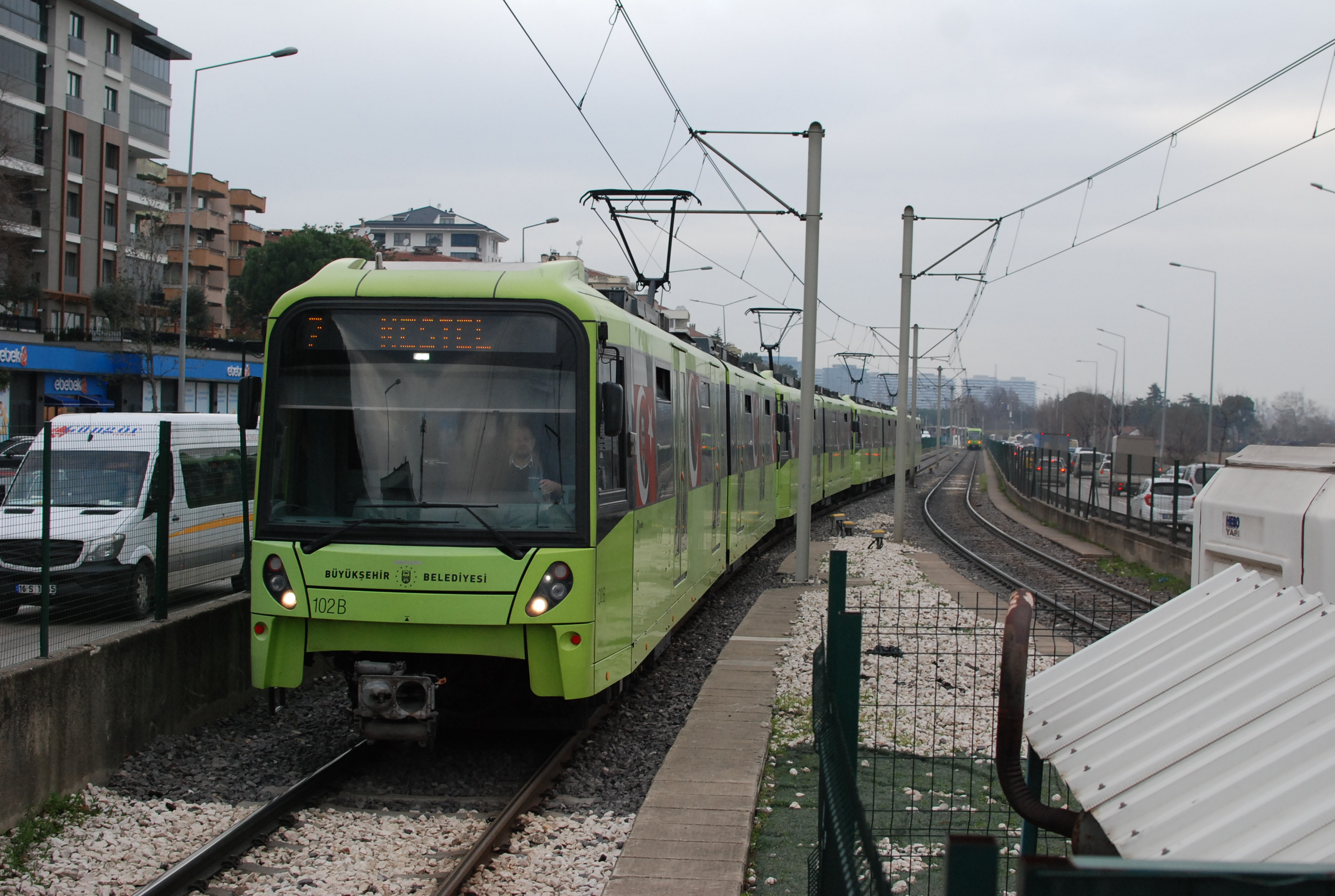

== See also ==
- Trams in Bursa
- List of metro systems
