= Sétif tramway =

Tramway in Sétif, Algeria

Sétif Tramway
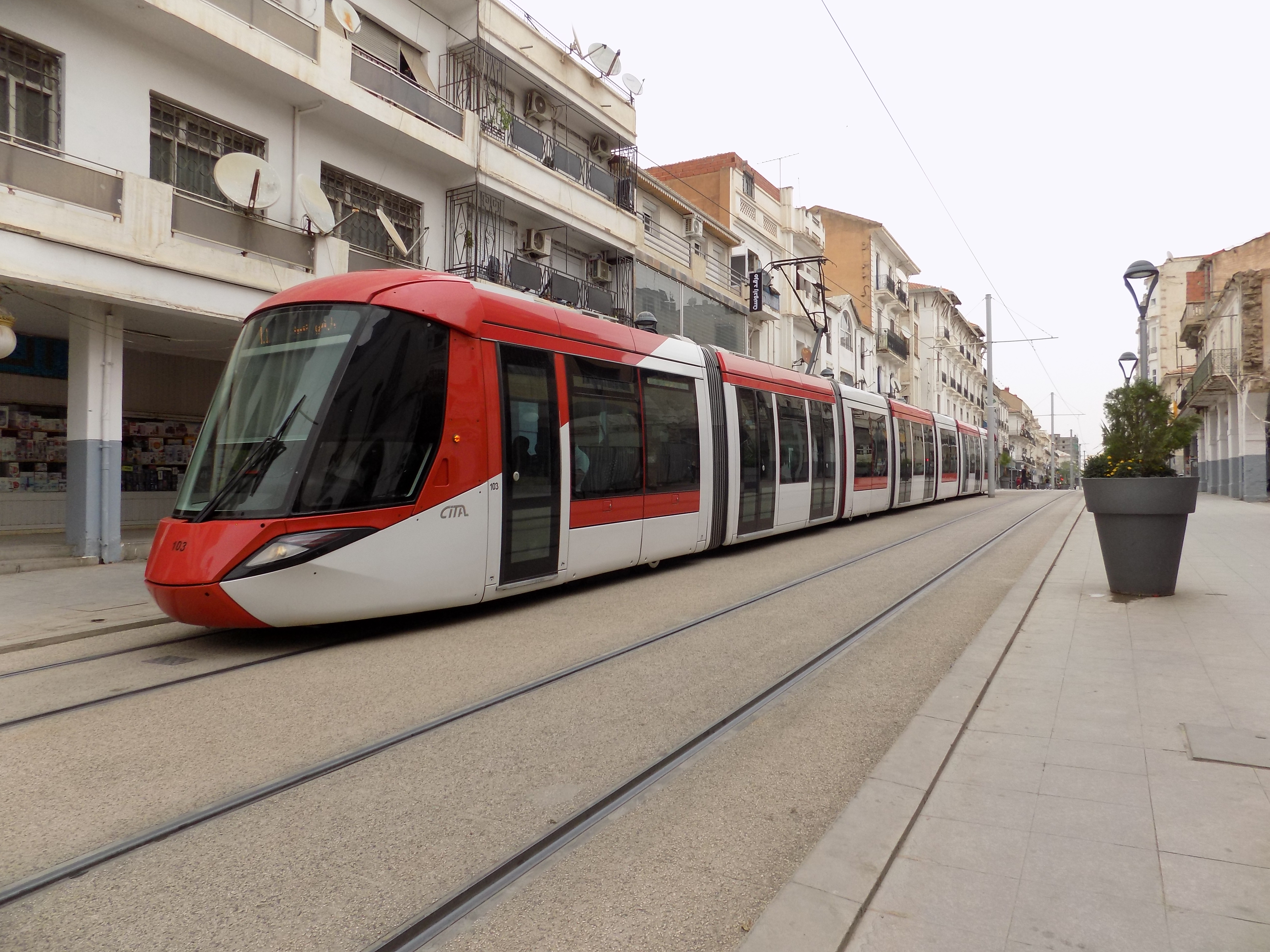

Overview
- Native name: ترامواي سطيف
- Locale: Sétif, Algeria
- Transit type: Tram
- Number of lines: 1
- Number of stations: 26

Operation
- Began operation: 8 May 2018

Technical
- System length: 15.2 km (9.4 mi)
- Track gauge: 1,435 mm (4 ft 8 1/2 in) standard gauge
System map
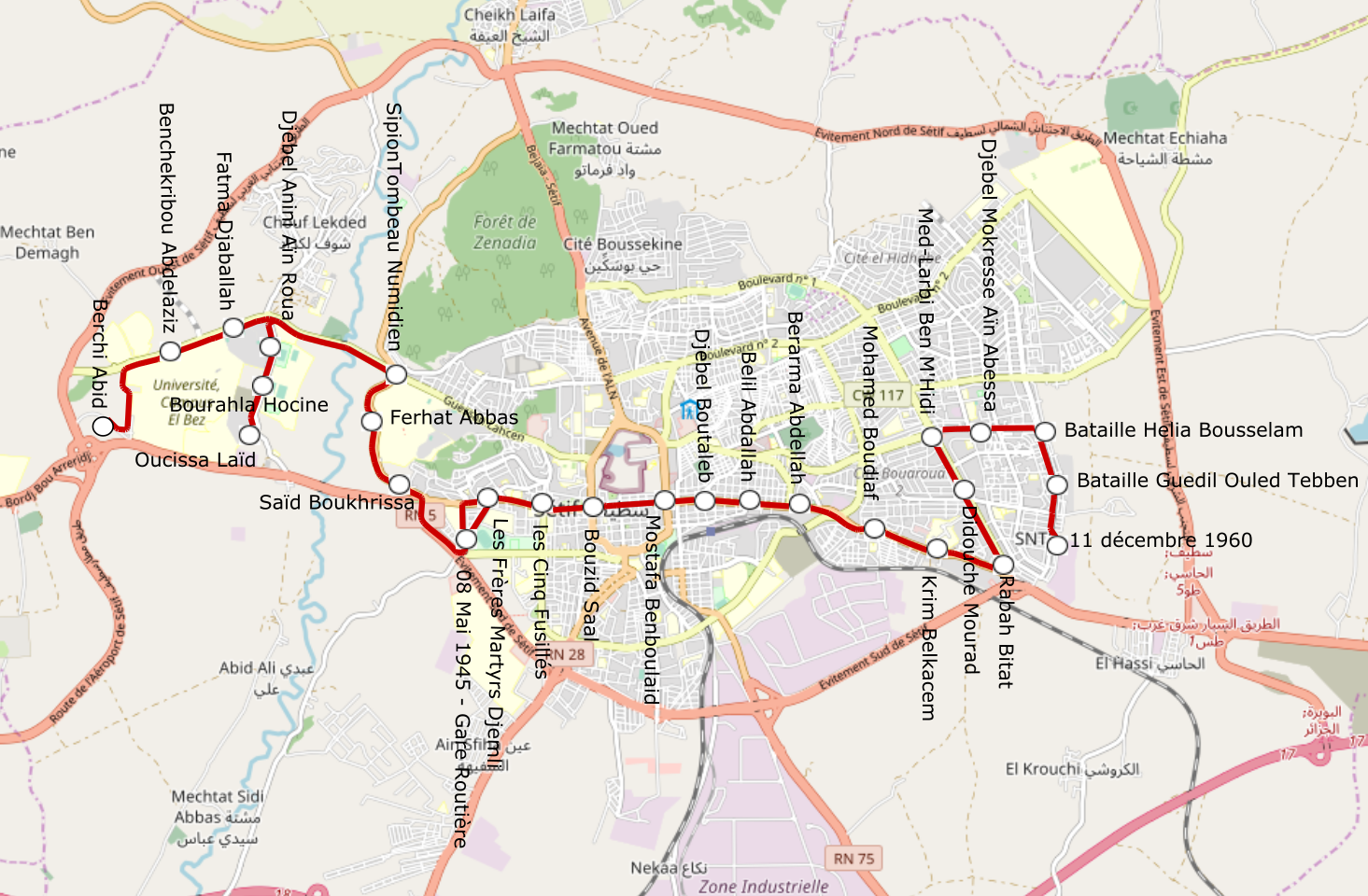

The Sétif Tramway (in Arabic: ترامواي سطيف) is a system of public transport in Sétif, Algeria. The first section includes 15.2 kilometres (9.4 mi) of route and 26 stops.

The Sétif Tramway was built and equipped by a joint venture of Alstom and Turkey-based construction company Yapı Merkezi.

The Sétif Tramway commenced public services on 8 May 2018.
