= Sidi Bel Abbès tramway =

Tram network serving Sidi Bel Abbès, Algeria

Sidi Bel Abbès Tramway

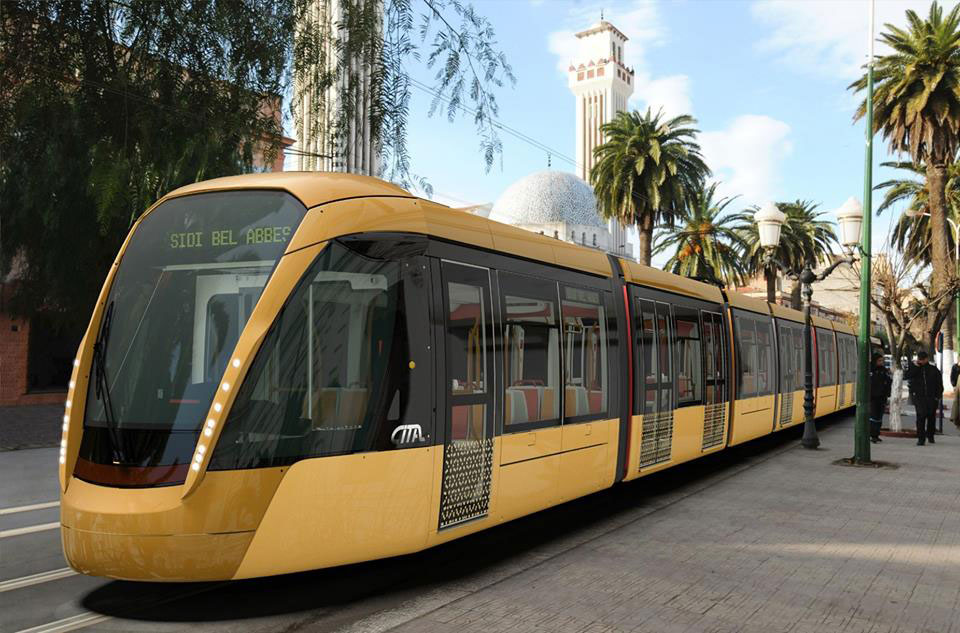

Overview
- Native name: ترامواي سيدي بلعباس
- Locale: Sidi Bel Abbès, Algeria
- Transit type: Tram
- Number of lines: 1
- Number of stations: 22

Operation
- Began operation: 25 July 2017
- Operators: SETRAM, EMA

Technical
- System length: 13.74 km (8.54 mi)
- Track gauge: 1,435 mm (4 ft 8 1/2 in) standard gauge
System map
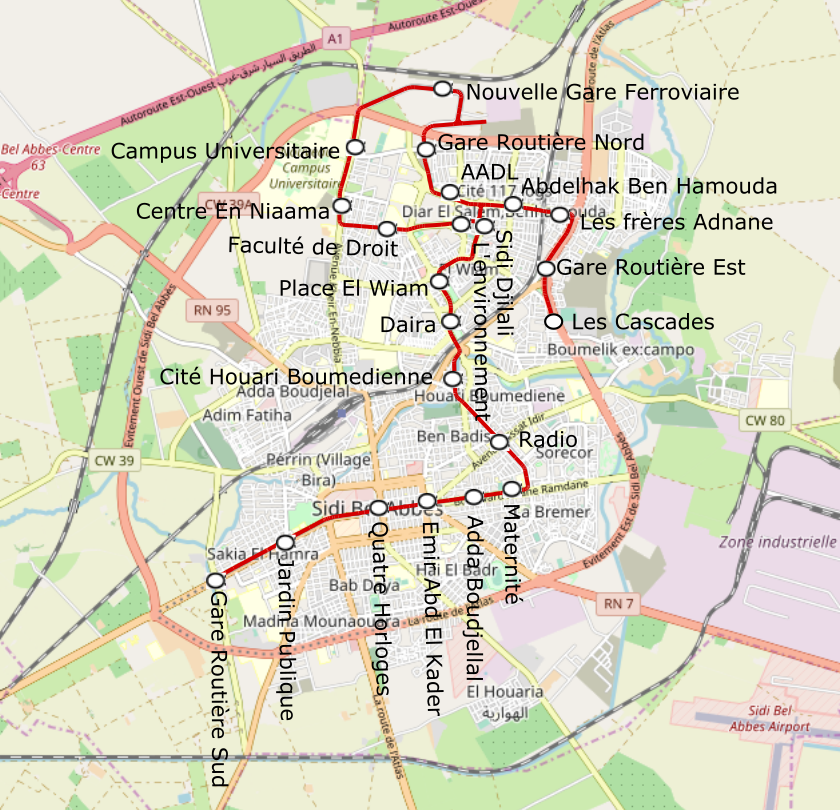

The Sidi Bel Abbès tramway (Arabic: ترامواي سيدي بلعباس) is a tramway network serving Sidi Bel Abbès, Algeria. Opened in 2017, the first section includes 13.74 kilometres (8.54 mi) of route and 22 stops.

== History ==
The construction of the line was commissioned to the Turkish company Yapi Merkezi and its subcontractor ENGIE.

On 22 June 2013, the Algerian Minister of Transport, Amar Tou, announced the start of work on the network.

The first of the 30 Alstom Citadis 402 type trams, assembled by the Annaba-based Cital, was delivered to Sidi Bel Abbès on 8 April 2016.

The network was inaugurated on 25 July 2017.

== Stations ==
There are 22 stations in the Sidi Bel Abbès tramway system all in one line.The L1 has 5 Exchange poles (3 Coach Stations, the new railway station and 2 tramway stations crossing).

== Rolling Stock ==
The Sidi Bel Abbès tramway uses Alstom Citadis 402 similar to the one in Algiers tramway that has been assembled in Annaba.

== Extensions ==
There were another four stations that should have been brought to the system which would have passed over the Southern ring road of the city and ending in Cité 20 Août neighborhood but it was abandoned by SETRAM for unknown reasons.

== Ticketing ==
The Price of a ride in the system is 30DA the cheapest along Ourgla's and Mostaganem's Tramway respectively. There are also "Twasoli" cards which works on a monthly basis and tariff changes depending on age and employment of the commuter.
