= Orléans tramway =

Tram system in Orléans, France

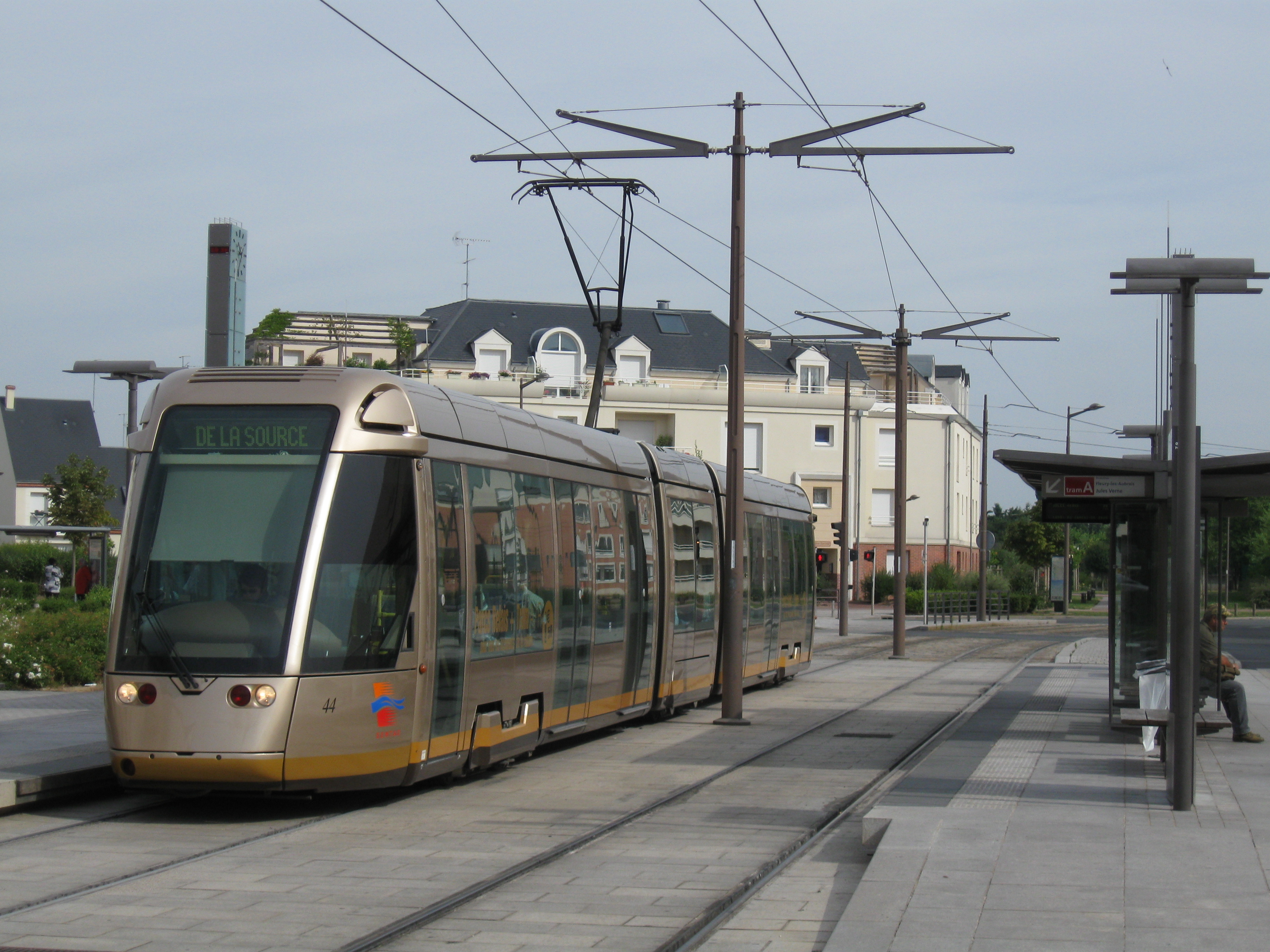

Overview
- Native name: Tramway d'Orléans
- Locale: Orléans, Centre-Val de Loire, France
- Transit type: Tram
- Number of lines: 2
- Number of stations: 51
- Annual ridership: 18.46 million (2018)

Operation
- Began operation: 24 November 2000
- Operator: Société d'Exploitation des Transports de l'Agglomération Orléanaise (SETAO)

Technical
- System length: 29.3 km (18.2 mi)
- Track gauge: 1,435 mm (4 ft 8 1/2 in) standard gauge
System map
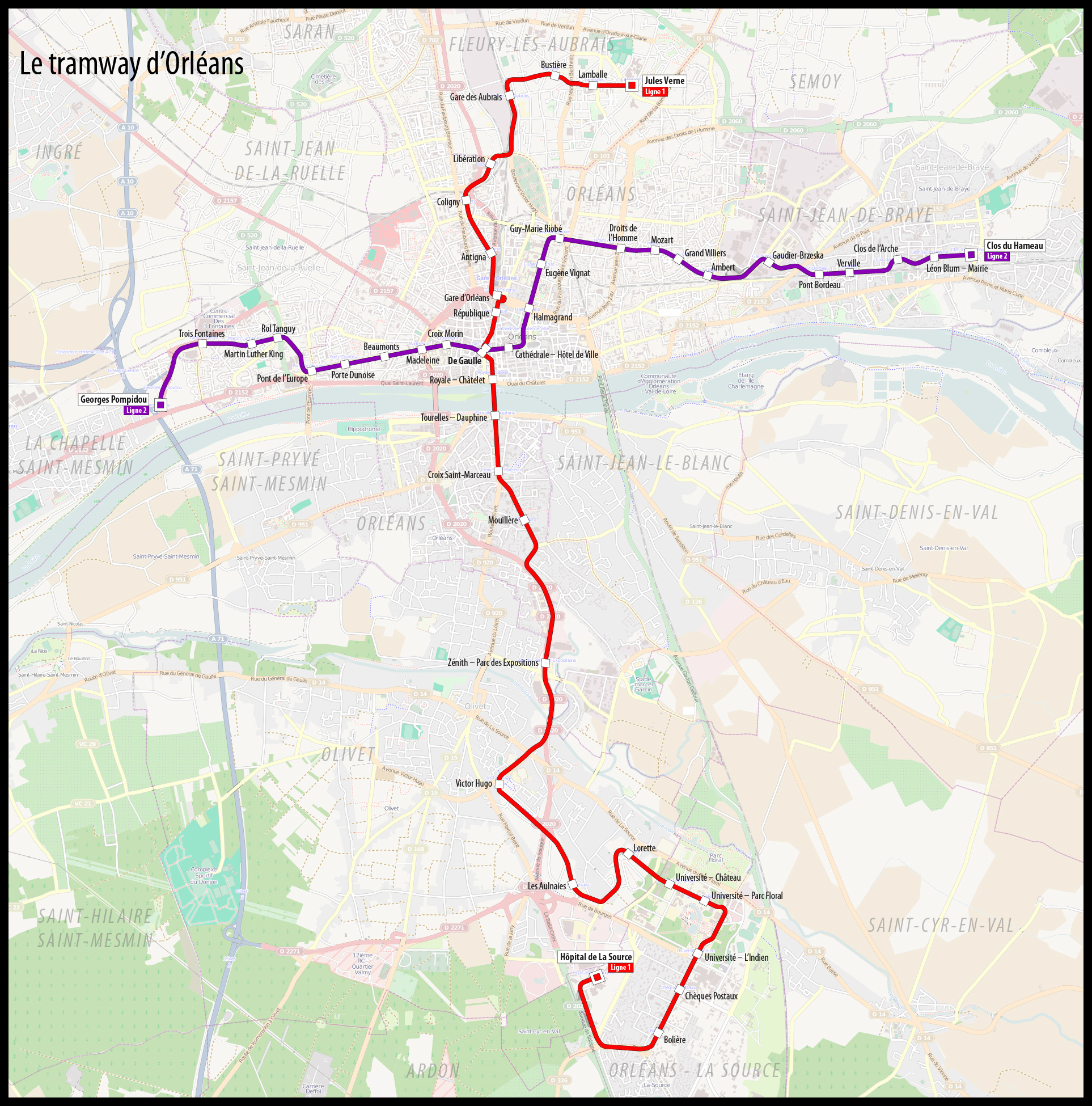
Map of Orléans tramway

The Orléans tramway (French: Tramway d'Orléans) consists of two tram lines in the city of Orléans, Centre-Val de Loire, France. Line A runs roughly north–south, and Line B roughly east–west. The lines cross at Place De Gaulle in the city centre.

== Line A ==
This 18-kilometre (11 mi) north–south line connects Fleury-les-Aubrais with Orleans La Source, and serves 24 stations. The line is served by 22 trams.

== Line B ==
A second 11-kilometre (6.8 mi) east-west line was approved in 2005. The line connects the communes of La Chapelle-Saint-Mesmin, Saint-Jean-de-la-Ruelle, Orléans, and Saint-Jean-de-Braye, serving 25 stations, and opened in June 2012. 21 Alstom Citadis 302 trams were ordered to provide the service.

== Ticketing ==
Several tram stops have ticket machines offering a variety of ticket types. As of May 2023, a standard single ticket cost €1.70. The same tickets can also be used on the local bus network.

== See also ==
- Trams in France
- Transport in Orléans
- List of town tramway systems in France
