= Constantine tramway =

Tram network in Algeria

Coordinates: 36.3583°N 6.6056°E

Constantine Tramway
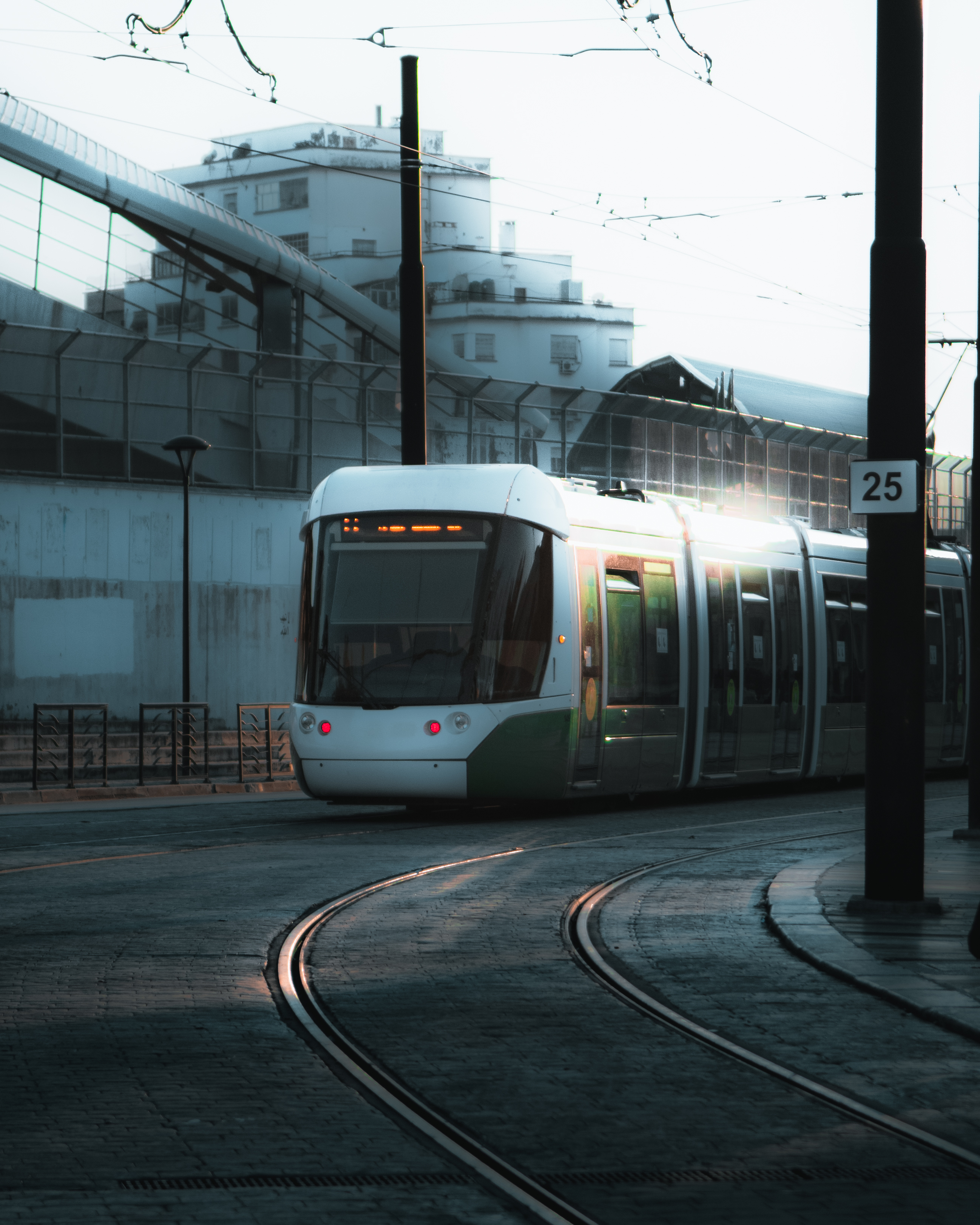
- An Alstom Citadis 402 entering Benabdelmalek Ramdhane station, January 2022

Overview
- Native name: ترامواي قسنطينة
- Owner: Entreprise Métro d'Alger (EMA)
- Locale: Constantine, Algeria
- Termini: Benabdelmalek Ramdhane; Université Abdelhamid Mehri
- Stations: 21
- Website: setram.dz/nos-reseaux/CST

Service
- Type: tramway
- Services: 1
- Operator: Société d'exploitation des tramways (SETRAM)
- Depot: Zouaghi Slimane
- Rolling stock: 51 Alstom Citadis 402
- Daily ridership: ~50,000

History
- Opened: 4 July 2013
- Last extension: 29 September 2021

Technical
- Line length: 18.4 kilometres (11.4 mi) approx.
- Track gauge: 1,435 mm (4 ft 8 1/2 in) standard gauge
- Electrification: 750 V DC Overhead line
- Operating speed: 70 kilometres per hour (43 mph) (off-street)
Map of the system before the 2019 and 2021 extensions
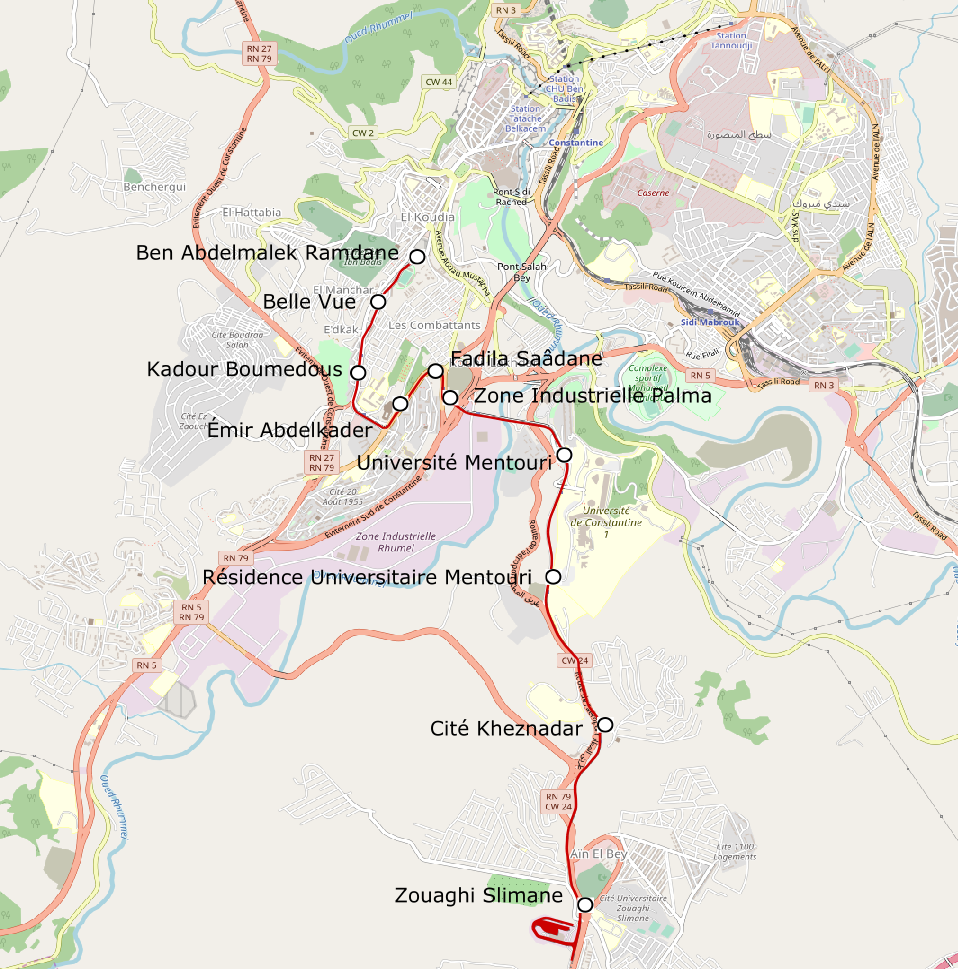

The Constantine tramway (French: Tramway de Constantine; Arabic: ترامواي قسنطينة) is a tramway network serving Constantine, the third-largest city in Algeria. Opened in 2013, the tramway is operated by the Société d'exploitation des tramways (SETRAM) and owned by the Entreprise Métro d'Alger (EMA). As of 2026, the network consists of one 18.4-kilometre-long (11.4 mi) line connecting Constantine with the nearby town of Ali Mendjeli, with a second route, running to El Khroub via Mohamed Boudiaf International Airport, being planned.

First planned in the early 2000s, the tramway experienced several delays and cost overruns during the course of its completion. Construction lasted from 2008 to 2013, and the tramway opened on 4 July 2013. A southern extension to the network added 10 kilometres (6.2 mi) to the line and opened in stages, first on 3 June 2019, and later on 29 September 2021.

Although it is generally referred to as a 'tramway', the network's tendencies are in fact closer to a light rail or an interurban rather than a tramway.

== History ==
=== 2004–2008: Initial plans and preparation ===
The first plan for a tramway in Constantine dates back to the early 2000s, with feasibility studies being started in 2004. Originally, the tramway's single line was meant to start at the Place des Martyrs ('Martyrs' Square') in central Constantine and run south to the Zouaghi district, with a later extension further south to the town of Ali Mendjeli being planned.

From its inception, the project had been mired in controversy and local opposition, mostly due to the requirement of the removal of historical buildings along its route in the city centre. The biggest conflict point was with the demolition of the Coudiat prison, an Algerian national heritage site which had listed status since 1992. In addition, locals also opposed the construction of the tramway due to the disruption it would bring to the city's road network, as it was considered that the introduction of trams on narrow streets and sidewalks would result in 'clutter'.

The design, tender, supervision of construction, and management of the tramway project was awarded to a consortium of Ingérop and Semaly (now Egis Rail) in December 2005, with Ingérop acting as the team leader in charge of all works related to the tramway. Work would be carried out on behalf of the Entreprise Métro d'Alger (EMA), who awarded the contract. The déclaration d'utilité publique of the tramway was approved on 22 December 2005.

Construction on the line was originally meant to start in April 2007, however this date was later postponed. At around the same time that the line was supposed to start construction, the most controversial part of the project, that being the section of the line in the centre of the city, was cancelled and the line was cut back to Benabdelmalek Ramdhane, as the result of a presidential decree not to demolish the Coudiat prison.

In November 2007, a consortium of Alstom and Pizzarotti won the tender for turnkey construction of the tramway, with Pizzarotti being in charge of the civil engineering works, while Alstom supplied the tram vehicles, carried out track laying, and constructed the overhead power supply, signalling, and telecommunications equipment. Surveying work on the route of the tramway was completed in May 2008.

=== 2008–2013: Construction and opening ===
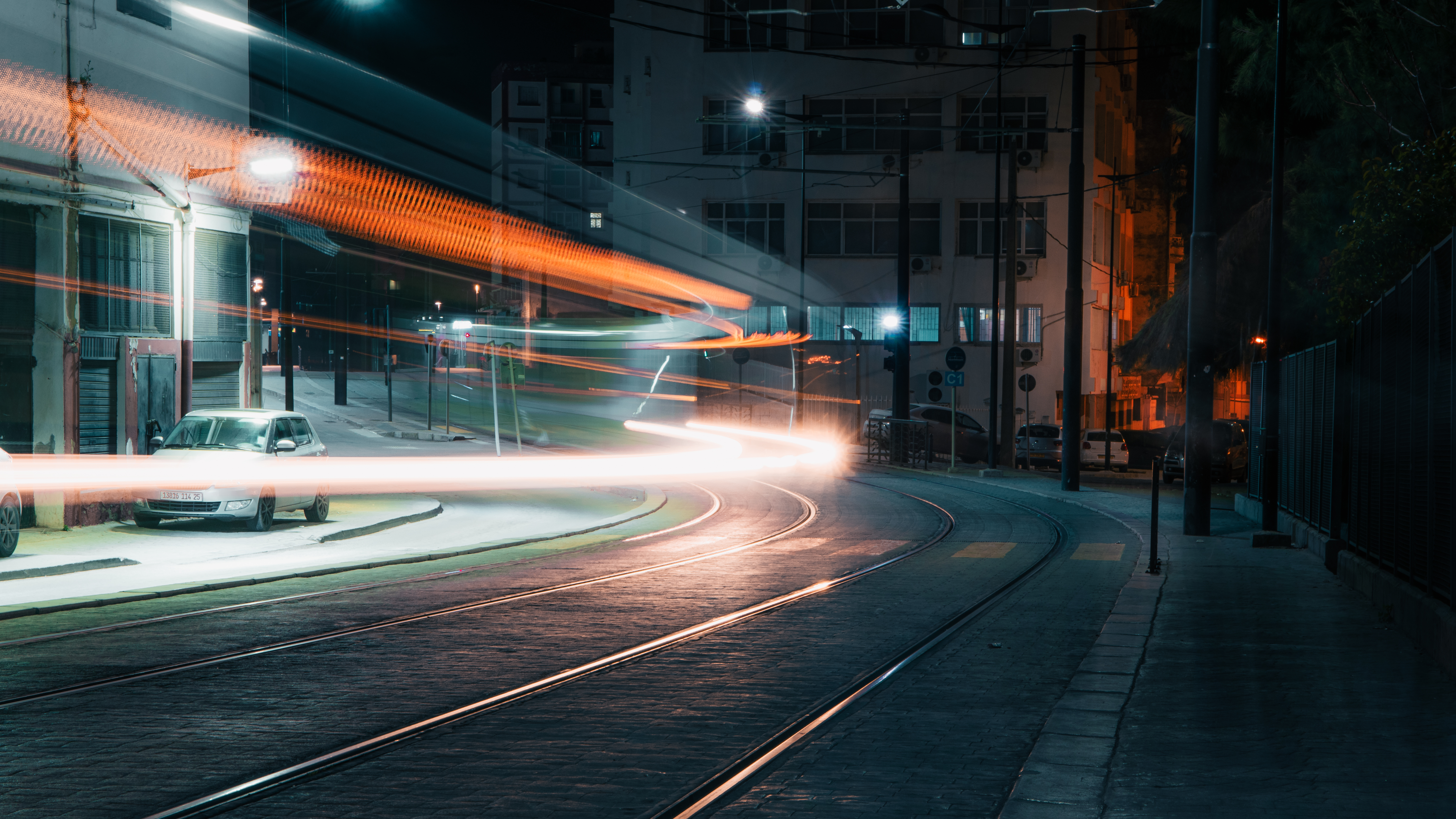
A tram near Benabdelmalek Ramdhane station, March 2022

Construction on the line, from Benabdelmalek Ramdhane in the city centre south to Zouaghi Slimane over a distance of 7.6 kilometres (4.7 mi), began on 2 August 2008, with the demolition of the Ben Abdelmalek Ramdhane stadium's stands, clearing the way for the tramway's route.

The pace of the tramway's construction varied throughout late 2008 and 2009, however in January 2010 the first delay in construction was announced, lasting a period of around 5-6 months. In March 2011, a strike was launched by construction workers which greatly hindered the progress of the tram's construction. As a result of the strike and other financial, technical, and administrative problems that had plagued the project, opening of the tramway was delayed again from 2011 to late 2012. On 24 September 2011, the first of the 27 Alstom Citadis 402 trams ordered for the tramway was delivered.

By April 2012, construction of the tramway was 72% complete, and on April 30, the first test run was completed over a distance of 1.5 kilometres (0.93 mi) near the depot in Zouaghi, with opening of the tramway also being announced as happening in the first quarter of 2013. Trial running continued throughout 2012, and by December 2012, construction was 90% complete. The first test run along the entire route of the tramway was completed on 25 December 2012.

The tramway was officially inaugurated from Benabdelmalek Ramdhane to Zouaghi Slimane on 4 July 2013, with passenger services beginning the next day. By the time of its opening, the line had become the most expensive tramway project in Algeria, costing a total of 44 billion dinars, or around 4.8 billion dinars per kilometre.

=== 2015–2021: Extension to Ali Mendjeli ===
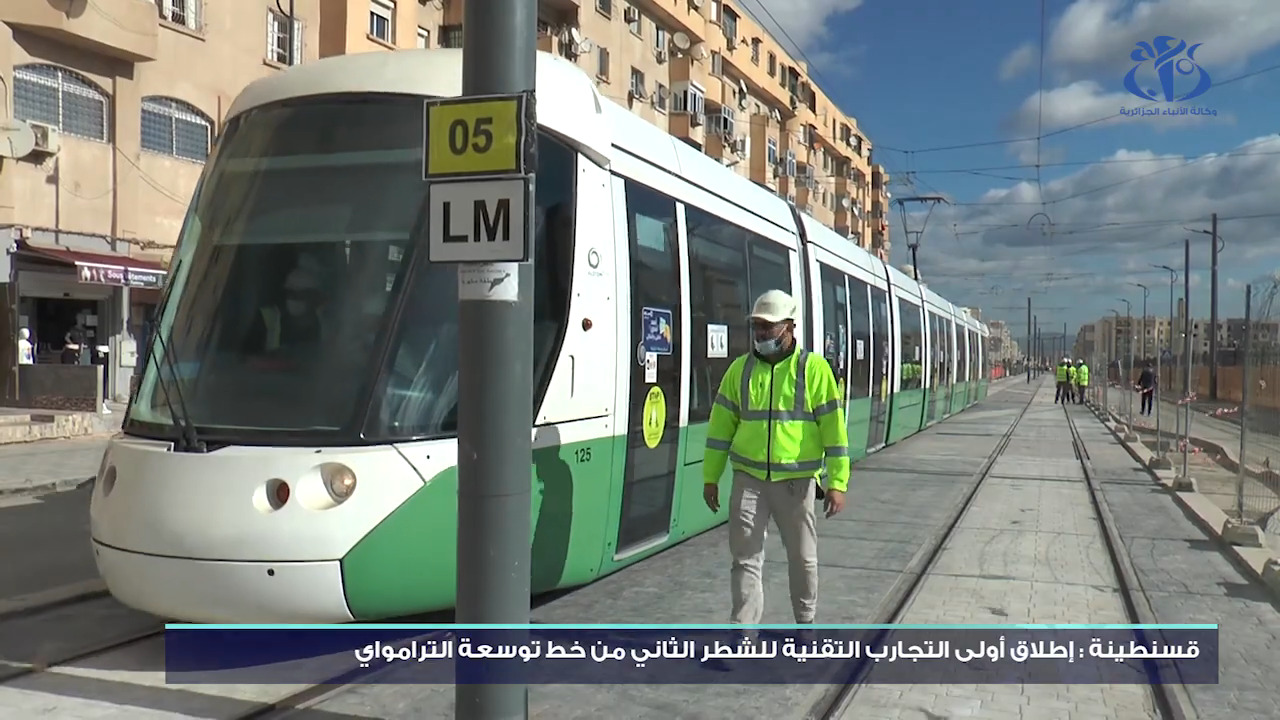
Test running on the second phase of the southern extension, January 2021

In July 2015, the EMA awarded the contract for extending the tramway further south to the town of Ali Mendjeli to a consortium of Alstom, Isolux Corsán, Coviam, and Cosider. The contract would extend the tramway by 10 kilometres (6.2 mi), and amounted to around 80 million euros. Alstom would supply the track, signalling, catenary, telecommunications, and substation infrastructure, while the other project partners would carry out the civil engineering works.

In order to accommodate the demands of the new extension, plans were made to expand the existing tram fleet with locally-assembled trams built by the Cital joint-venture. A total of 24 trams were ordered for the extension, the first of which was delivered to Constantine from the Cital plant in Annaba on 29 December 2015. Delivery of the trams continued until 2017.

The first phase of the southern extension, running for 7 kilometres (4.3 mi) from Zouaghi Slimane to Chahid Kadri Brahim station in the north of Ali Mendjeli, opened on 3 June 2019. Test running on the second stage of the extension, from Chahid Kadri Brahim to Université Abdelhamid Mehri via the town centre of Ali Mendjeli, began on 23 January 2021. The 3.8-kilometre (2.4 mi) long extension opened on 29 September 2021.

== System ==
=== Route and infrastructure ===
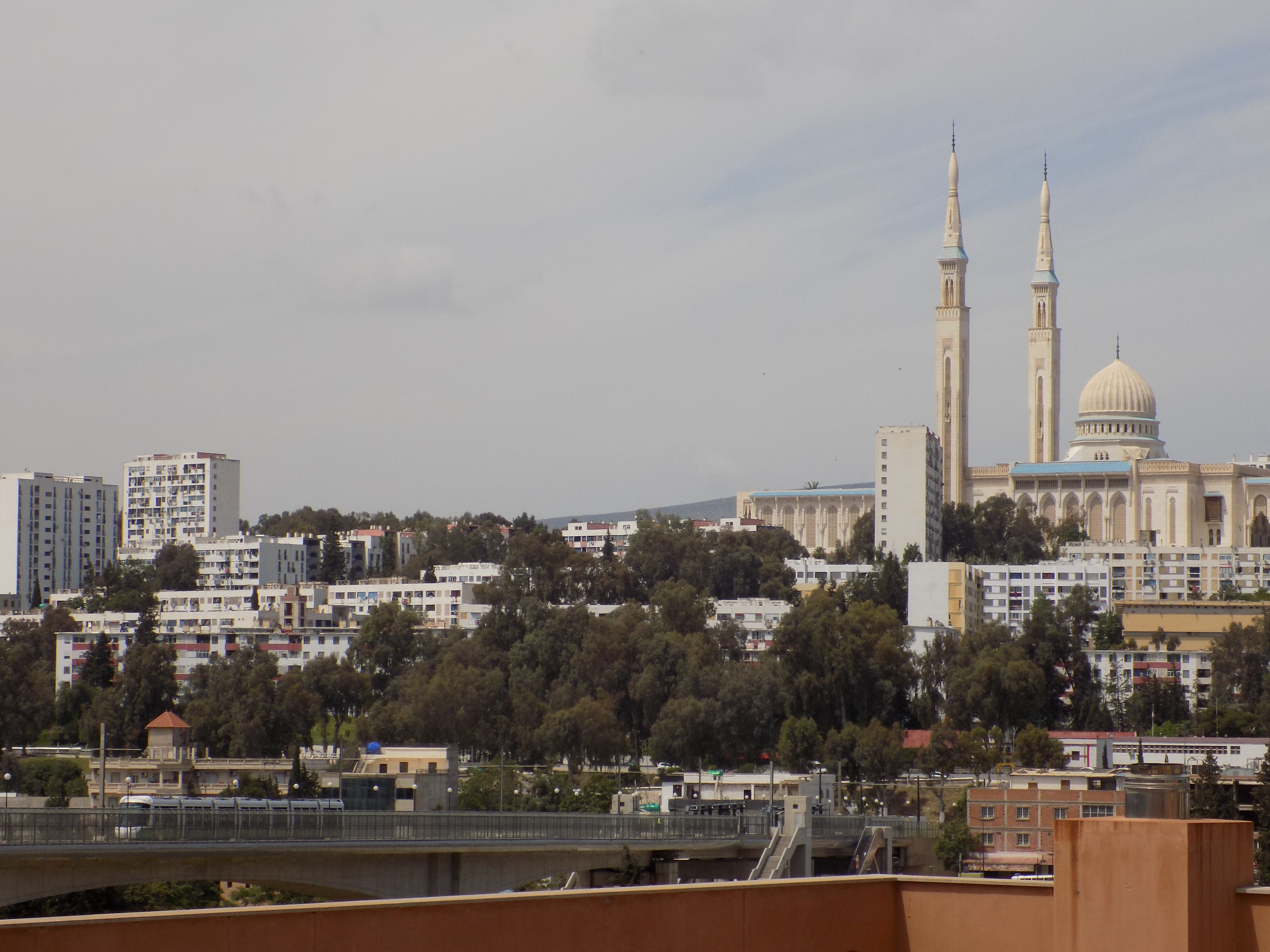
A tram on the Rhumel viaduct, May 2024

The tramway network's single line runs on a north-south alignment from the southern edge of Constantine city centre to the town of Ali Mendjeli, connecting three universities as well as the communities in Constantine's southern suburbs. As the line runs between Constantine and Ali Mendjeli, its characteristics are closer to those of an interurban or light rail line rather than a tramway, as the section between El Aifour and Université Salah Boubnider runs through undeveloped land.

Owing to Constantine's difficult geography, the tramway also has several notable civil works. The largest piece of infrastructure on the line is the multi-modal (Note: Aside from trams, the viaduct is also open for use to pedestrians and cyclists.) viaduct over the Rhumel River, which at a length of 465 metres (1,526 ft) is one of the largest single pieces of tramway infrastructure in Algeria. The line also encounters many large slopes and grades on its route. Other civil works on the line include bridges near El Aifour and Cité El-Istiklal, as well as some short tunnels. The line runs entirely on its own reserved right-of-way separate from other vehicle traffic, although with some level crossings for road vehicles.

The network runs on standard-gauge (1435 mm) tracks, and electrification is supplied by a 750 V DC overhead line. The tramway depot and maintenance centre is located south of Zouaghi Slimane station.

=== Stations ===
Geographical route map with stations

Stations are listed from north to south:

	Station	Commune served	Date opened
■	Benabdelmalek Ramdhane	Constantine	4 July 2013
●	Belle Vue	Constantine	4 July 2013
●	Kadour Boumedous	Constantine	4 July 2013
●	Émir Abdelkader	Constantine	4 July 2013
●	Cité Fadila Saâdane	Constantine	4 July 2013
●	Zone Industrielle Palma	Constantine	4 July 2013
●	Université Mentouri	Constantine	4 July 2013
●	Résidence Universitaire Mentouri	Constantine	4 July 2013
●	Cité Kheznadar	Constantine	4 July 2013
●	Zouaghi Slimane	Constantine	4 July 2013
●	El Aifour	Constantine	3 June 2019
●	Université Salah Boubnider	Ali Mendjeli	3 June 2019
●	19 Mai 1956	Ali Mendjeli	3 June 2019
●	8 Mai 1945	Ali Mendjeli	3 June 2019
●	Chahid Kadri Brahim	Ali Mendjeli	3 June 2019
●	Chouhada	Ali Mendjeli	29 September 2021
●	Cité El-Istiklal	Ali Mendjeli	29 September 2021
●	Ali Mendjeli	Ali Mendjeli	29 September 2021
●	Avenue de l'ALN	Ali Mendjeli	29 September 2021
●	Ennasr	Ali Mendjeli	29 September 2021
■	Université Abdelhamid Mehri	Ali Mendjeli	29 September 2021

== Rolling stock ==
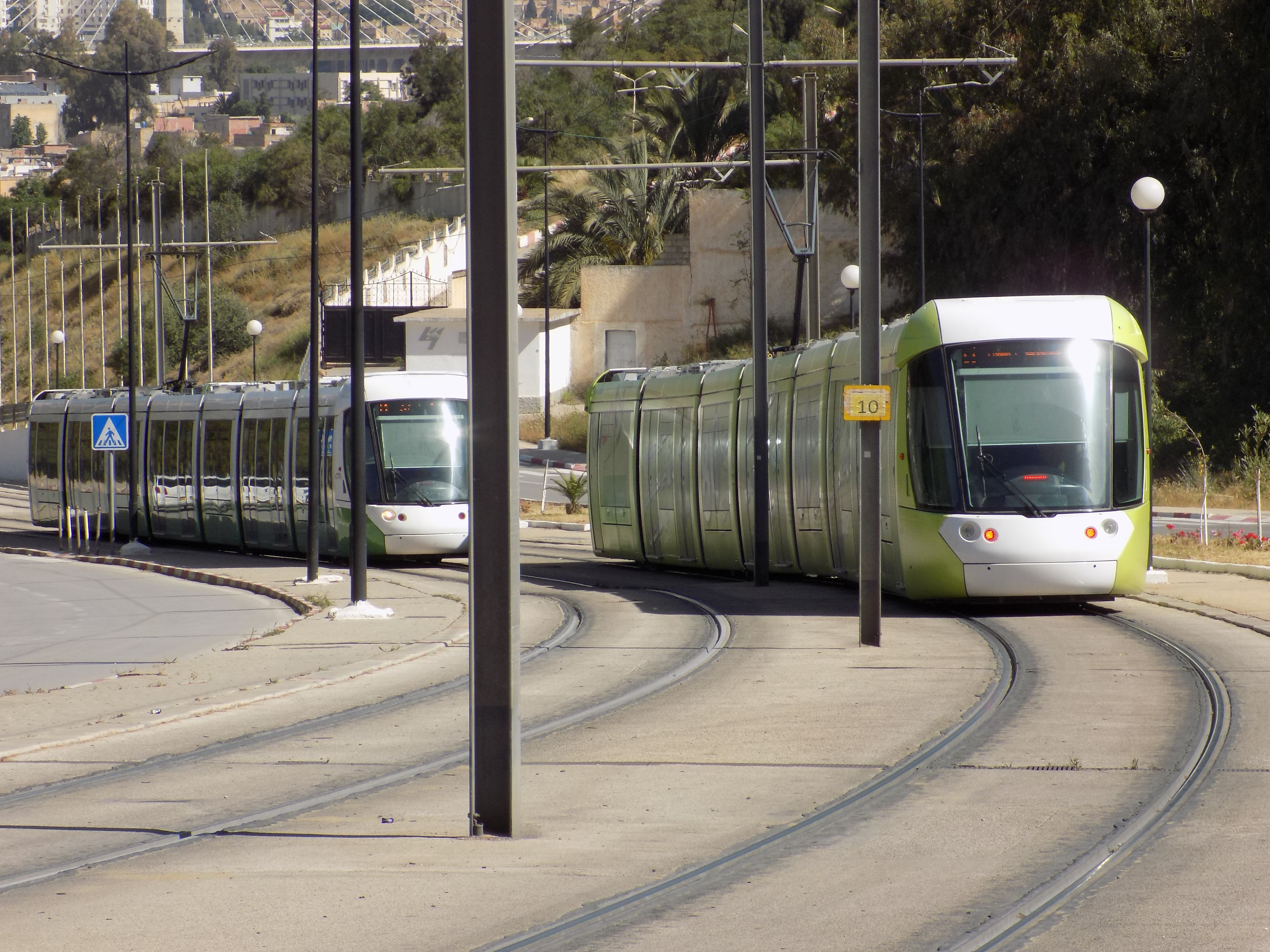
Two trams cross near Université Mentouri station, May 2024

The tramway fleet consists of 51 7-section Alstom Citadis 402 vehicles, although this total is divided into two separate orders.

The first series of 27 Citadis 402 trams were ordered from Alstom as a part of the turnkey tramway project signed in 2007, and manufactured at the Alstom factory in Santa Perpetua, Spain. The first tram vehicle was delivered on 24 September 2011, and all vehicles were delivered by the time of the tramway's opening in 2013. The low-floor trams were designed by the French agency RCP Design Global.

The second series, consisting of 24 Citadis 402 vehicles, was ordered as part of the southern extension plans in order to add capacity to the system. The trams are visually and mechanically similar to the first series, however they differ in their place of origin: instead of being built by Alstom, the trams were assembled locally as kits in Annaba, Algeria by the Cital joint-venture. The first tram of the new series was delivered on 29 December 2015, and production continued until 2017.

Fleet numbers	Manufacturer/assembler	Year(s) built	Place of origin	Notes
101-127	Alstom	2011-2012	Spain	Tram #102 transferred to Algiers in September 2024
128-151	Cital	2015-2017	Algeria	Tram #150 transferred to Algiers in May 2024

Although the necessary number of trams was ordered to serve both the existing and planned lines, the normal operation of the tramway currently only requires 28 vehicles. As a result of this, there is a large surplus of trams that are not being used. As of 2025, two trams have been transferred to the Algiers tram network to meet the increased demand there: #102 in September 2024, and #150 in May 2024. It is possible that more trams may be transferred in the future, due to the high demand of ridership on the Algiers tramway.

== Planned lines and extensions ==
As part of the southern extension contract signed in 2015, provisions were made for a second 16.4-kilometre (10.2 mi) long line that would branch off of the first line at Zouaghi Slimane station and run southeast to the town of El Khroub via Mohamed Boudiaf International Airport. Switches and tracks for this branch have already been installed south of Zouaghi Slimane, however the line remains in the planning phase. It is unknown when the line will start construction.

== Operation ==
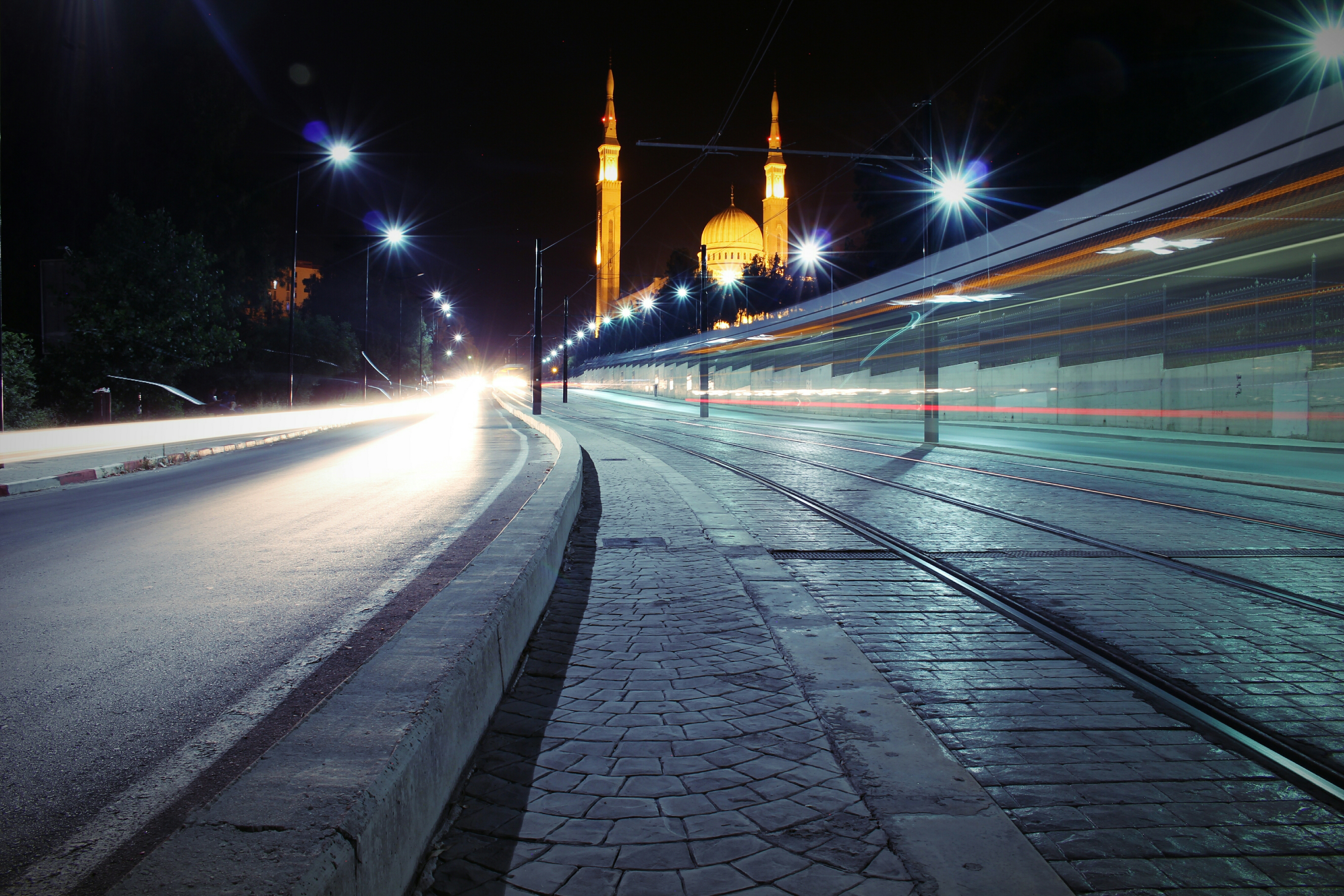
A tram near the Emir Abdelkader mosque, June 2019

Since its opening, the tramway has been operated by SETRAM (Société d'Exploitation des Tramways), a joint-venture established in 2012 for the operation of tram networks nationwide.

The tramway uses a computerised system to prioritise trams over pedestrians and vehicles at traffic lights along its route. The tramway network's average commercial speed is 20 kilometres per hour (12 mph), similar to other forms of transit, such as private vehicles and public transit buses, on the route. A ticket counter is available at each stop. Also at each stop, and within each tram, a machine for riders to load/validate their Tawassol subscription, or buy tickets, is provided.

The service runs every five minutes with the exception of late night suspension.

In October 2016, SETRAM and the Entreprise de transport urbain et suburbain de Constantine (ETUSC), Constantine's urban transit operator, set up a single, monthly fare for both bus and tram travel. Priced at 20 Algerian dinars (€0.13, US$0.14), it was introduced to assist students and civil servants traveling to Salah Boubnider University.

=== Ridership statistics ===
Yearly ridership (2013–2024)
Year	Number of passengers	Reference(s)
2013	1,948,182	
2014	4,939,559	
2015	6,854,692	
2016	7,230,016	
2017	9,066,704	
2018	9,867,944	
2019	10,434,302	
2020	8,456,783	
2021	13,236,789	
2022	~11,000,000	
2023	~18,000,000	
2024	~23,700,000	

== See also ==
- Constantine Cable Car
- Algiers tramway
- Oran tramway
