= Citadis =

Family of low-floor trams and light rail vehicles

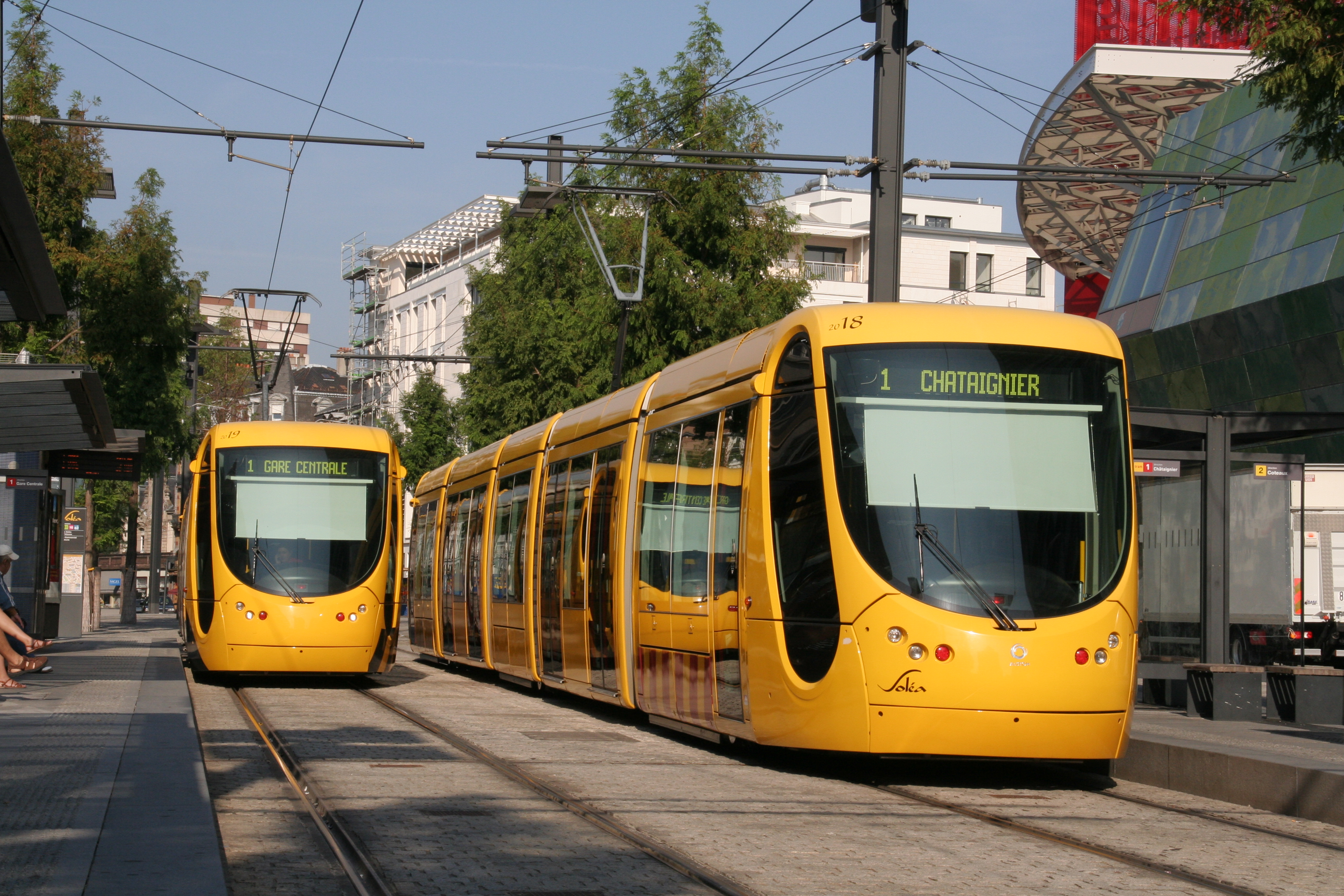
Two Citadis 302 trams in Mulhouse

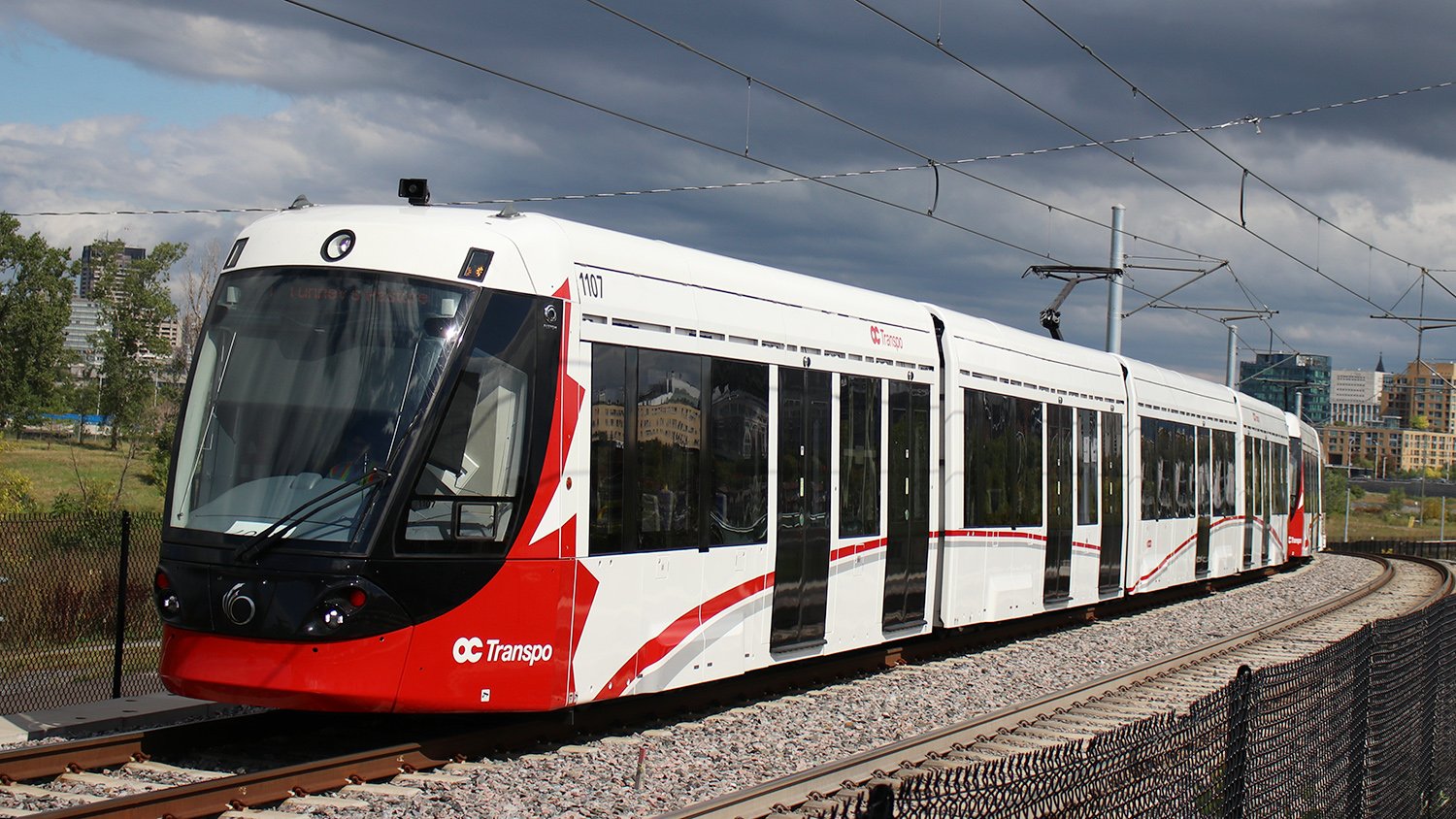
Citadis Spirit, the model designed for North American operators, seen on Ottawa's O-Train Line 1

Citadis is a family of low-floor trams and light rail vehicles built by Alstom. As of 2025, over 8,000 Citadis trams have been ordered, with operations in over 140 cities on all six inhabited continents. An evolution of Alstom's earlier TFS vehicle, most Citadis vehicles are made in Alstom's factories in La Rochelle and Valenciennes, France, and in Barcelona, Spain, and Annaba, Algeria. (Note: Citadis Spirit light rail vehicles are built in Brampton, Kingston, and Sorel-Tracy, Canada, and Hornell, USA.)

== Types ==
The Citadis family includes both partial and fully low-floor trams and LRVs. Several versions are of the multi-articulated design, with alternating wheeled and suspended sections. These are built with three, five, seven, and nine sections. The whole line-up includes the following standard variants:

=== Urban tramway vehicles ===
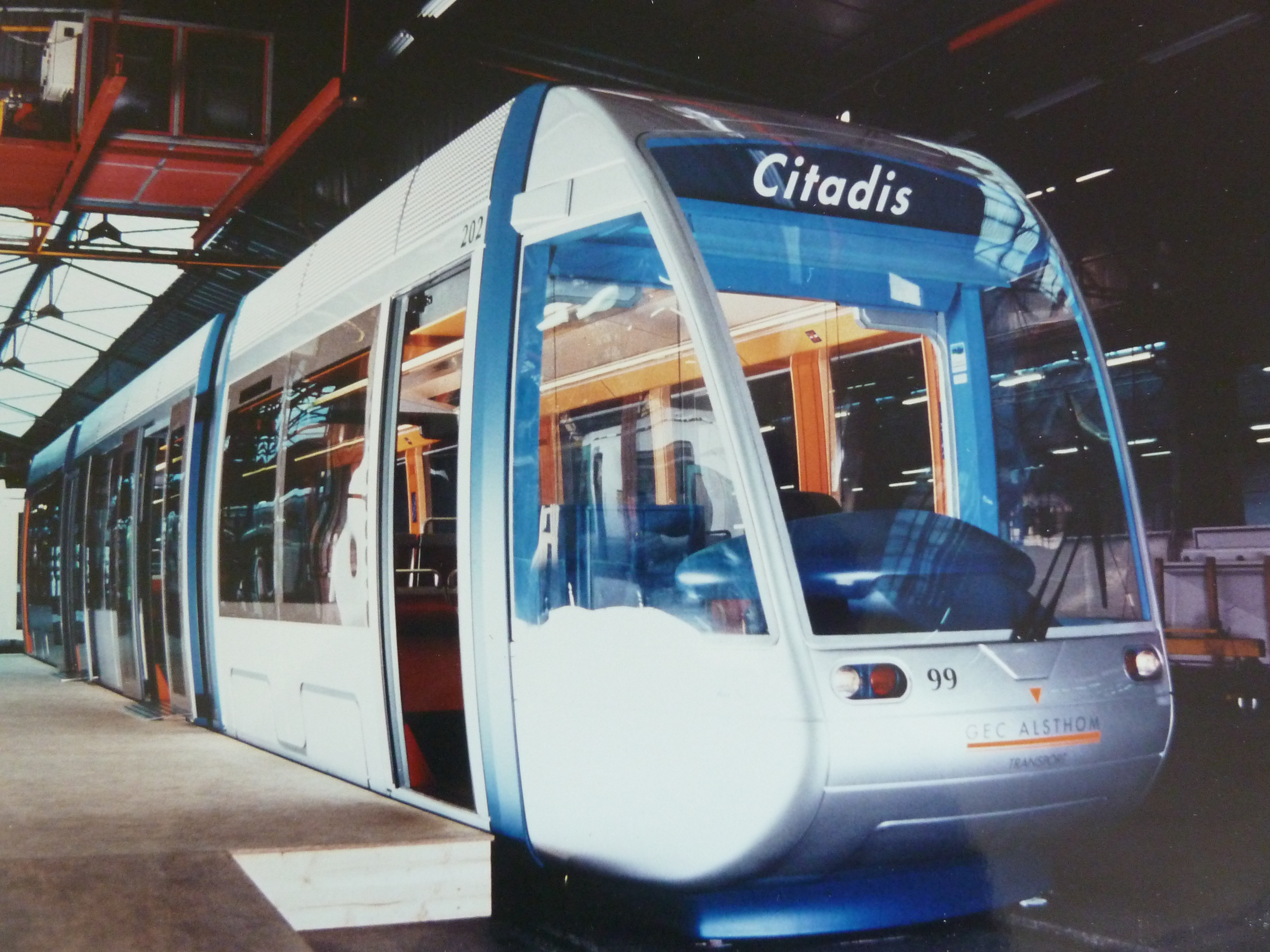
A mock-up of an early Citadis design built by Alstom's predecessor, GEC-Alsthom, in 1997

- Citadis X00
  - Citadis 100 – three section, 70% low floor, originally designed and manufactured by Konstal in Chorzów for the Polish market (Katowice, Gdańsk)
- Citadis X01 (first generation)
  - Citadis 301 – three section, 70% low floor (Orléans)
    - Citadis 301 CIS – 100% low floor version with IPOMOS bogies on 1,524 mm (5 ft) gauge (Moscow, Saint-Petersburg). Also designated 71-801 according to the Russian unified system of rolling stock classification (71=trams, 8=manufacturer code (Alstom), 01=model code).
  - Citadis 401 – five sections, 70% low floor (Montpellier and Dublin, some converted from 301s)
- Citadis X02 (second generation)
  - Citadis 202 – three section, 100% low floor (Melbourne)
  - Citadis 302 – five sections, 100% low floor (Adelaide, Angers, Lyon, Bordeaux, Paris T2, T7 and T8, Valenciennes, Rotterdam, Buenos Aires, Madrid, Melbourne, Nice, Murcia, Barcelona, Jerusalem, Le Havre, Tenerife, Oran and Nottingham)
  - Citadis 402 – seven sections, 100% low floor (Bordeaux, Grenoble, Lyon, Paris T3, Dubai, Rio de Janeiro, Algiers, Constantine)
  - Citadis 502 – nine sections, 100% low floor (Dublin, some converted from 402s)
- Citadis X03 (third generation)
  - Citadis 403 – seven sections, 100% low floor (specially ordered for Strasbourg)
- Citadis X04 (fourth generation)
  - Citadis 304 – 100% low floor, next generation design for Central and Eastern Europe (Istanbul)
- Citadis X05 (fifth generation)
  - Citadis 205 (also known as Citadis Compact) – three sections, 100% low floor (Aubagne, Avignon)
  - Citadis 305 – five sections, 100% low floor (Sydney, Lusail, Caen, Kaohsiung, Barcelona, Athens, Philadelphia)
  - Citadis 405 – seven sections, 100% low floor (Nice, Paris T9, T10)
  - Citadis SX05 (also known as Citadis Classic) – 70%/100% low floor + high floor (Frankfurt, Cologne) (Note: The Citadis Classic branding is also used by Alstom to market legacy tram models inherited from Bombardier Transportation (see Alstom Flexity#Legacy models).)

=== Light-rail transit vehicles ===
- Regio-Citadis – three sections, 70% low floor LRV (Kassel, The Hague)
- Citadis Dualis – four or five sections, 100% low-floor LRV (Paris T4, Nantes, Lyon)
- Citadis Spirit – three or four sections, 100% low floor LRV designed for the North American market (Ottawa Line 1 & Line 3, Toronto Line 6, Brampton/Mississauga Line 10, Quebec City TramCité)

=== Power supply ===
Like most trams, Citadis vehicles are usually powered by overhead electric wires collected by a pantograph, but the trams in several places do not use pantograph current collection entirely.

The most popular solution is Alstom's proprietary ground-level power supply (APS, first used in Bordeaux and subsequently in Angers, Reims, Orleans, Tours, Dubai, Rio, Barcelona, and Sydney), consisting of a type of third rail which is only powered while it is completely covered by a tram so that there is no risk of a person or animal coming into contact with a live rail. On the networks in France and in Sydney, the trams switch to conventional overhead wires in outer areas, but the Dubai vehicles are the first to employ APS for its entire passenger length (although they are still equipped with pantographs for use in the maintenance depot).

Another option is to use on-board batteries to store electrical power, allowing brief periods of catenary-free operation without the need to install special infrastructure. The Citadis trams in Nice operate off a set of nickel metallic hydride batteries in two large open spaces where overhead wires would be an eyesore. This has since been superseded by a supercapacitor-based energy storage system (SRS) which is in use in Rio de Janeiro (alongside APS), Kaohsiung, and along a new line in Nice. The Regio-Citadis can also be built as a dual-voltage or electro-diesel vehicle with various configurations.

== Ordered trams ==
=== Africa ===
Country	City	Image	Type	Fleet numbers	Quantity	Year	Length	Width	Comments
Algeria	Algiers		402	101–141	41	2009–2011	43.9 m (144 ft 3/8 in)	2.65 m (8 ft 8 3/8 in)	
Algeria	Algiers		402	142-148	7	2012	43.9 m (144 ft 3/8 in)	2.65 m (8 ft 8 3/8 in)	
Algeria	Constantine		402	101–127	27	2011–2012	43.9 m (144 ft 3/8 in)	2.65 m (8 ft 8 3/8 in)	
Algeria	Constantine		402	128–151	24	2015–2017	43.9 m (144 ft 3/8 in)	2.65 m (8 ft 8 3/8 in)	Assembled in Algeria by the Cital joint venture
Algeria	Oran		302	101–130	30	2011	32.5 m (106 ft)	2.65 m (8 ft 8 3/8 in)	
Algeria	Oran		302	131–151	21	2016-2017	32.5 m (106 ft)	2.65 m (8 ft 8 3/8 in)	Assembled in Algeria by the Cital joint venture
Algeria	Ouargla		402	101–123	23	2016–2018	43.9 m (144 ft 3/8 in)	2.65 m (8 ft 8 3/8 in)	Assembled in Algeria by the Cital joint venture
Algeria	Mostaganem		402	101–125	25	2017–2018	43.9 m (144 ft 3/8 in)	2.65 m (8 ft 8 3/8 in)	Assembled in Algeria by the Cital joint venture
Algeria	Sidi Bel Abbès		402	101–130	30	2016–2017	43.9 m (144 ft 3/8 in)	2.65 m (8 ft 8 3/8 in)	Assembled in Algeria by the Cital joint venture
Algeria	Setif		402	101–126	26	2017–2018	43.9 m (144 ft 3/8 in)	2.65 m (8 ft 8 3/8 in)	Assembled in Algeria by the Cital joint venture
Morocco	Casablanca		302	001–074	74	2012–2013		2.65 m (8 ft 8 3/8 in)	Single ended – operate in service as semi-permanently coupled back-to-back pairs
Morocco	Casablanca		302	075–124	50	2017–2018		2.65 m (8 ft 8 3/8 in)	Single ended – operate in service as semi-permanently coupled back-to-back pairs
Morocco	Casablanca		305	125–190	66	2023–2024		2.65 m (8 ft 8 3/8 in)	Single ended – operate in service as semi-permanently coupled back-to-back pairs
Morocco	Rabat-Salé		302	001–044	44	2010–2011	32–64 m (104 ft 11 7/8 in – 209 ft 11 5/8 in) in MU	2.65 m (8 ft 8 3/8 in)	38 single-ended trams (operating in service as back-to-back pairs), plus 6 bidirectional trams
Morocco	Rabat-Salé		302	045–066	22	2019–2020	32–64 m (104 ft 11 7/8 in – 209 ft 11 5/8 in) in MU	2.65 m (8 ft 8 3/8 in)	Single ended – operate in service as back-to-back pairs
Tunisia	Tunis		302	M401–M430	30	2007–2008	32–64 m (104 ft 11 7/8 in – 209 ft 11 5/8 in) in MU	2.4 m (7 ft 10 1/2 in)	Single ended – operate in service as back-to-back pairs
Tunisia	Tunis		302	M431–M439	9	2009	32–64 m (104 ft 11 7/8 in – 209 ft 11 5/8 in) in MU	2.4 m (7 ft 10 1/2 in)	Single ended – operate in service as back-to-back pairs
Tunisia	Tunis		302	M501–M516	16	2012–2013	32–64 m (104 ft 11 7/8 in – 209 ft 11 5/8 in) in MU	2.4 m (7 ft 10 1/2 in)	Single ended – operate in service as back-to-back pairs

=== Asia ===
Country	City	Image	Type	Fleet numbers	Quantity	Year	Length	Width	Comments
China	Chengdu		302		40	2018	32.6 m (106 ft 11 1/2 in)	2.65 m (8 ft 8 3/8 in)	
China	Shanghai/Songjiang		302		30	2018	33 m (108 ft 3 1/4 in)	2.65 m (8 ft 8 3/8 in)	
Taiwan	Kaohsiung		305		15	2018-2019	33.4 m (109 ft 7 in)	2.65 m (8 ft 8 3/8 in)	Uses SRS system

=== North America ===
The main article provides vehicle and order descriptions.

Country	City	Image	Type	Fleet numbers	Quantity	Year	Length	Width	Comments
Canada	Ottawa		Citadis Spirit	1101–1134	34 (+38 planned)	2018	48 m (157 ft 5 3/4 in)	2.65 m (8 ft 8 3/8 in)	Four-module vehicles
Canada	Toronto		Citadis Spirit	6500–6517	18	2019-2022	48 m (157 ft 5 3/4 in)	2.65 m (8 ft 8 3/8 in)	Four-module vehicles. Ordered with the Hurontario LRT cars as part of a group order
Canada	Mississauga/Brampton		Citadis Spirit		0 (43 planned)	2020-2022	N/A	2.65 m (8 ft 8 3/8 in)	Four-module vehicles. Ordered with Toronto as part of a group order
Canada	Quebec City		Citadis Spirit		0 (34 planned)	2023	48 m (157 ft 5 3/4 in)	2.65 m (8 ft 8 3/8 in)	Four-module vehicles
United States	Philadelphia		305		0 (130 planned, plus 30 options)	2026-2030			Ordered 2023; production expected to start in 2026

=== South America ===
Country	City	Image	Type	Fleet numbers	Quantity	Year	Length	Width	Comments
Brazil	Rio de Janeiro		402	101–132	32	2016	44 m (144 ft 4 1/4 in)	2.65 m (8 ft 8 3/8 in)	Equipped with APS system
Ecuador	Cuenca		302	1001–1014	14	2015–2016	32.4 m (106 ft 3 5/8 in)	2.40 m (7 ft 10 1/2 in)	Equipped with APS system

=== Middle East ===
Country	City	Image	Type	Fleet numbers	Quantity	Year	Length	Width	Comments
Israel	Jerusalem		302		46	2009		2.65 m (8 ft 8 3/8 in)	
United Arab Emirates	Dubai		402	001–011	11	2013–2014		2.65 m (8 ft 8 3/8 in)	Equipped with APS
Qatar	Lusail		305	01–028	28	2018–2019	32 m (104 ft)	2.65 m (8 ft 8 3/8 in)	Equipped with APS

=== Europe ===
Country	City	Image	Type	Fleet numbers	Quantity	Year	Length	Width	Comments
France	Angers		302	1001–1017	17	2009	32.4 m (106 ft 3 5/8 in)	2.40 m (7 ft 10 1/2 in)	
France	Angers		305	2001–2020	20	2022–2023	33.5 m (109 ft 10 7/8 in)	2.40 m (7 ft 10 1/2 in)	
France	Aubagne		205 (Compact)	001–008	8	2014	22 m (72 ft 2 1/8 in)	2.40 m (7 ft 10 1/2 in)	First Citadis Compact ordered. Options for 10.
France	Aubagne		205 (Compact)	N/A	4		22 m (72 ft 2 1/8 in)	2.40 m (7 ft 10 1/2 in)	
France	Avignon		205 (Compact)	101–114	14	2018–2019	22 m (72 ft 2 1/8 in)	2.40 m (7 ft 10 1/2 in)	
France	Besançon		305	N/A	5	2025–2026	32 m (104 ft 11 7/8 in)	2.40 m (7 ft 10 1/2 in)	Ordered with Brest and Toulouse in a group order
France	Besançon		305	N/A	3	2025–2026	32 m (104 ft 11 7/8 in)	2.40 m (7 ft 10 1/2 in)	
France	Bordeaux		402	2201–2232; 2301–2306; 2501–2520; 2801–2804; 1301–1326; 1827–1846; 1847–1856	113	2002; 2003; 2005; 2008; 2013–2014; 2018; 2019	43.9 m (144 ft 3/8 in)	2.40 m (7 ft 10 1/2 in)	The Citadis delivered from 2013 now have two doors per side on their central pod.
France	Bordeaux		302	2241–2246; 2541–2546	12	2002; 2005	32.8 m (107 ft 7 3/8 in)	2.40 m (7 ft 10 1/2 in)	
France	Brest		302	101–120	26	2012	32 m (104 ft 11 7/8 in)	2.40 m (7 ft 10 1/2 in)	Ordered with Dijon as part of a group order
France	Brest		305	2001–2008	8	2025	32 m (104 ft 11 7/8 in)	2.40 m (7 ft 10 1/2 in)	Ordered with Besançon and Toulouse in a group order
France	Caen		305	1001–1026	26	2018–2019	33 m (108 ft 3 1/4 in)	2.40 m (7 ft 10 1/2 in)	
France	Dijon		302	1001–1033	33	2012–2013	32 m (104 ft 11 7/8 in)	2.40 m (7 ft 10 1/2 in)	Ordered with Brest as part of a group order
France	Grenoble		402	6001–6035; 6036–6050	49	2005, 2009	43 m (141 ft 7/8 in)	2.40 m (7 ft 10 1/2 in)	
France	Le Havre		302	001–022	22	2012		2.40 m (7 ft 10 1/2 in)	
France	Le Havre		X05	N/A	8 (planned)	2027	33 m (108 ft 3 1/4 in)	2.40 m (7 ft 10 1/2 in)	
France	Le Mans		302	1001–1034	34	2007, 2011, 2014	32.0 m (104 ft 11 7/8 in)	2.40 m (7 ft 10 1/2 in)	To be extended to 44 m (144 ft 4 1/4 in) in 2026
France	Lille		305	N/A	27	2026	32.4 m (106 ft 3 5/8 in)	2.40 m (7 ft 10 1/2 in)	First Citadis ever built for metric tracks
France	Lyon		302	0801–0847, 0848–0857, 0858–0870, 0871–0873	73	2000, 2006, 2009, 2010	32.4 m (106 ft 3 5/8 in)	2.40 m (7 ft 10 1/2 in)	
France	Lyon		402	0874–0885, 0886–0892	19	2012–2016	43.8 m (143 ft 8 3/8 in)	2.40 m (7 ft 10 1/2 in)	Replaces the Citadis 302 on line 3; the 302s are transferred to other lines.
France	Lyon		402	0893–0907, 0908–0942, 0943–?	50	2019–2020, 2024–2026, 2027	44 m (144 ft 4 1/4 in)	2.40 m (7 ft 10 1/2 in)	New front due to new safety standards. Replaces the Citadis 302 on line 4; 302s were transferred to other lines.
France	Lyon		Citadis Dualis	TT201–TT224	24	2011-2013	42 m (137 ft 10 in)	2.40 m (7 ft 10 1/2 in)	Used on the Western Lyon tram-train. Also designated U-52500 as per SNCF classification.
France	Montpellier		301	2001–2028	30	1999–2000	40.9 m (134 ft 2 1/4 in)	2.65 m (8 ft 8 3/8 in)	Extended to Citadis 401
France	Montpellier		302	2031–2033, 2041–2064	27	2006–2007	32.5 m (106 ft 7 1/2 in)	2.65 m (8 ft 8 3/8 in)	
France	Montpellier		402	2070–2089, 2098–2099	23	2011–2012, 2014	43 m (141 ft 7/8 in)	2.65 m (8 ft 8 3/8 in)	
France	Mulhouse		302	01–27	27	2005–2006	32.5 m (106 ft 7 1/2 in)	2.40 m (7 ft 10 1/2 in)	Two of these (04 and 05) were used in Argentina on the Tranvía del Este, in Buenos Aires, while five were sold to Melbourne, Victoria, Australia and re-designated as the C2-class Melbourne tram.
France	Nantes		405	401–461	61	2023–2025, 2026–2027	46 m (150 ft 11 in)	2.40 m (7 ft 10 1/2 in)	Will replace the older TFS. Delivery of the first 49 trams started in 2024 for completion in 2026, while 12 additional trams will be delivered in 2027.
France	Nantes		Citadis Dualis	TT101–TT124	24	2009-2015	42 m (137 ft 10 in)	2.65 m (8 ft 8 3/8 in)	Used for service on the Nantes tram-train. Also designated U-53500 as per SNCF classification.
France	Nice		302	01–28	28	2006–2007, 2010	33 m (108 ft 3 1/4 in)	2.65 m (8 ft 8 3/8 in)	Trams from 14 to 28 are extended to 402. First Citadis trams to use nickel metallic hydride batteries for catenary-free operation.
France	Nice		405	29–53	25	2017–2018, 2019	45 m (147 ft 7 5/8 in)	2.65 m (8 ft 8 3/8 in)	First ever Citadis X05 (fifth-generation) trams delivered in mainland Europe; also the first trams to use SRS
France	Orléans		301	39–60	22	2000–2001	29.9 m (98 ft 1 1/8 in)	2.32 m (7 ft 7 3/8 in)	
France	Orléans		302	61–81	21	2010–2012	32.3 m (105 ft 11 5/8 in)	2.40 m (7 ft 10 1/2 in)	
France	Paris		302	0401–0413, 0414–0426, 0427–0442, 0442–0460, 0461–0466	66	2002, 2003, 2008–2009, 2010–2012, 2015–2016	32.2 m (105 ft 7 3/4 in)	2.40 m (7 ft 10 1/2 in)	T2
France	Paris		402	0301–0321, 0322–0346, 0347–0363, 0364–0372	73	2005–2006, 2011–2012, 2017–2018, 2021	43.7 m (143 ft 4 1/2 in)	2.65 m (8 ft 8 3/8 in)	T3; starting from 0364, the trams are now delivered with the transit authority livery (Île-de-France Mobilités).
France	Paris		302	701–719	19	2013	32 m (104 ft 11 7/8 in)	2.40 m (7 ft 10 1/2 in)	T7
France	Paris		302	801–820	20	2014	32 m (104 ft 11 7/8 in)	2.40 m (7 ft 10 1/2 in)	T8; in the future, they will be transferred to the T7 for its extension to Juvisy while 7 of them will be modified to be on the T2.
France	Paris		405	901–922	22	2019–2020	44 m (144 ft 4 1/4 in)	2.65 m (8 ft 8 3/8 in)	T9
France	Paris		405	1001–1013	13	2022–2023	44 m (144 ft 4 1/4 in)	2.65 m (8 ft 8 3/8 in)	T10
France	Paris		305	01–37	37	2024–present	33.43 m (109 ft 8 1/8 in)	2.40 m (7 ft 10 1/2 in)	T1/T8. The first order will replace the older TFS on this line, while the rest will replace the older Citadis 302 on line T8 and will complete the fleet for the future extensions on these two lines.
France	Paris		Citadis Dualis	TT401–TT426	26	2018-2023	42 m (137 ft 10 in)	2.65 m (8 ft 8 3/8 in)	T4; also designated U-53700 as per SNCF classification.
France	Paris		Citadis Dualis	TT301–TT315	15	2016-2017	42 m (137 ft 10 in)	2.65 m (8 ft 8 3/8 in)	T11/T14; also designated U-53600 as per SNCF classification.
France	Paris		Citadis Dualis	TT601–TT625	25	2023-2024	42 m (137 ft 10 in)	2.65 m (8 ft 8 3/8 in)	T12; also designated U-52600 as per SNCF classification.
France	Paris		Citadis Dualis	TT501–TT511	11	2022	42 m (137 ft 10 in)	2.65 m (8 ft 8 3/8 in)	T13; also designated U-53800 as per SNCF classification.
France	Reims		302	101–118	18	2010	32.4 m (106 ft 3 5/8 in)	2.40 m (7 ft 10 1/2 in)	
France	Rouen		402	831–857	27	2011–2012	40–45 m (131 ft 2 3/4 in – 147 ft 7 5/8 in)	2.40 m (7 ft 10 1/2 in)	To replace the TFS; used as light rail vehicles.
France	Strasbourg		403	2001–2041	41	2005–2007	45 m (147 ft 7 5/8 in)	2.40 m (7 ft 10 1/2 in)	
France	Strasbourg		403	3001–3022, 3031–3047	39	2016–2018, 2021–2022	45.5 m (149 ft 3 in)	2.40 m (7 ft 10 1/2 in)	
France	Strasbourg		405	4001–4039	39	2025–2028	45 m (147 ft 7 5/8 in)	2.40 m (7 ft 10 1/2 in)	
France	Toulouse		302	5001–5025	24	2009–2010	32.4 m (106 ft 3 5/8 in)	2.40 m (7 ft 10 1/2 in)	Designed by Airbus
France	Toulouse		305	N/A	9 (planned)	2026	32.4 m (106 ft 3 5/8 in)	2.40 m (7 ft 10 1/2 in)	Ordered with Besançon and Brest in a group order
France	Tours		402	051–071	21	2012–2013	43 m (141 ft 7/8 in)	2.40 m (7 ft 10 1/2 in)	Equipped with APS
France	Valenciennes		302	01–30	30	2006, 2013	33 m (108 ft 3 1/4 in)	2.40 m (7 ft 10 1/2 in)	
Germany	Cologne		Classic (SX05)	N/A	64	2026 (planned)	60 m (196 ft 10 1/4 in) 30 m (98 ft 5 1/8 in)		62 60-metre trams and 2 30-metre trams
Germany	Frankfurt am Main		Classic (SX05)	301–358	58	2022-present	31.5 m (103 ft 4 1/8 in) 40 m (131 ft 2 3/4 in)	2.40 m (7 ft 10 1/2 in)	24 31.5-metre trams and 34 40-metre trams
Germany	Kassel		RegioCitadis	701–718	18	2004–2005	36.8 m (120 ft 8 7/8 in)	2.65 m (8 ft 8 3/8 in)	
Germany	Kassel		RegioCitadis	751–760	10	2004–2005	36.8 m (120 ft 8 7/8 in)	2.65 m (8 ft 8 3/8 in)	Hybrid with diesel engine
Greece	Athens		305		25	2020–2021	33 m (108 ft 3 1/4 in)	2.65 m (8 ft 8 3/8 in)	
Ireland	Dublin		301	3001–3026	26	2003–2004	40 m (131 ft 2 3/4 in)	2.40 m (7 ft 10 1/2 in)	Red line, in 2007 extended from 30 to 40 m (98 ft 5 1/8 in to 131 ft 2 3/4 in)
Ireland	Dublin		401	4001–4014	14	2003–2004	40 m (131 ft 2 3/4 in)	2.40 m (7 ft 10 1/2 in)	Red line (transferred from green line in 2010)
Ireland	Dublin		402	5001–5026	26	2009–2010	55 m (180 ft 5 3/8 in)	2.40 m (7 ft 10 1/2 in)	Green line, in 2020 extended from 43 to 55 m (141 ft 7/8 in to 180 ft 5 3/8 in)
Ireland	Dublin		502	5027–5033	7	2017–2018	55 m (180 ft 5 3/8 in)	2.40 m (7 ft 10 1/2 in)	Green line, longest Citadis trams ever built
Ireland	Dublin		502	5034–5041	8	2020	55 m (180 ft 5 3/8 in)	2.40 m (7 ft 10 1/2 in)	Green line, longest Citadis trams ever built
Netherlands	The Hague		RegioCitadis	4001–4054	54	2006–2007	36.8 m (120 ft 8 7/8 in)	2.65 m (8 ft 8 3/8 in)	
Netherlands	The Hague		RegioCitadis	4055–4072	18	2011	36.8 m (120 ft 8 7/8 in)	2.65 m (8 ft 8 3/8 in)	
Netherlands	Rotterdam		302	2001–2060	60	2003–2004	31.6 m (103 ft 8 1/8 in)	2.40 m (7 ft 10 1/2 in)	Unidirectional
Netherlands	Rotterdam		302	2101–2153	53	2011	30 m (98 ft 5 1/8 in)	2.40 m (7 ft 10 1/2 in)	Unidirectional
Poland	Gdańsk		100 (NGd99)	1001–1004	4	1999	26.6 m (87 ft 3 1/4 in)	2.35 m (7 ft 8 1/2 in)	Marketed as the Konstal NGd99, based on 100 series
Poland	Katowice		100 (116Nd)	800–816	17	2000	24 m (78 ft 8 7/8 in)	2.35 m (7 ft 8 1/2 in)	
Russia	Saint Petersburg		301 CIS	8900–8902, 8907	4	2014	25.5 m (83 ft 7 7/8 in)	2.50 m (8 ft 2 3/8 in)	Single ended; also classed as 71-801 according to system of rolling stock classification.
Spain	Barcelona		302	111.01–111.23	23	2003–2004	32 m (104 ft 11 7/8 in)	2.65 m (8 ft 8 3/8 in)	Trambaix network
Spain	Barcelona		302	211.01–211.18	18	2007	32 m (104 ft 11 7/8 in)	2.65 m (8 ft 8 3/8 in)	Trambesòs network. Retrofitted with APS in 2024.
Spain	Barcelona		305	311.19–311.21	3	2025	32 m (104 ft 11 7/8 in)	2.65 m (8 ft 8 3/8 in)	Trambesòs network; equipped with APS
Spain	Jaén		302	01–05	5	2010	32 m (104 ft 11 7/8 in)	2.40 m (7 ft 10 1/2 in)	
Spain	Madrid		302		70	2007	32 m (104 ft 11 7/8 in)	2.40 m (7 ft 10 1/2 in)	One of the trams was used on the Lidingöbanan in Stockholm for testing, and another in Buenos Aires on the Tranvía del Este.
Spain	Murcia		302		11	2011	32 m (104 ft 11 7/8 in)	2.40 m (7 ft 10 1/2 in)	
Spain	Tenerife		302	01–26	26	2006, 2009	32.2 m (105 ft 7 3/4 in)	2.4 m (7 ft 10 1/2 in)	On important dates, such as Carnivals or Christmas, trams operate as doubles.
Turkey	Istanbul		304	801–837	37	2009–2010	28 m (91 ft 10 3/8 in)	2.65 m (8 ft 8 3/8 in)	Used in service as coupled units for higher passenger capacity
UK	Nottingham		302	216–237	22	2013–2014	32 m (104 ft)	2.40 m (7 ft 10 1/2 in)	

=== Oceania ===
Country	City	Image	Type	Fleet numbers	Quantity	Year	Length	Width	Comments
Australia	Adelaide		302	201–209	9	2010, 2018	32 m (104 ft 11 7/8 in)	2.40 m (7 ft 10 1/2 in)	Surplus units purchased from Metro Ligero, Madrid in 2009 (6) and 2017 (3)
Australia	Melbourne		202	3001–3036	36	2001–2002	22.9 m (75 ft)	2.65 m (8 ft 8 3/8 in)	Locally designated C1-class
Australia	Melbourne		302	5103, 5106, 5111, 5113, 5123	5	2008–2009	32.5 m (106 ft)	2.65 m (8 ft 8 3/8 in)	Locally designated C2-class. Leased from Mulhouse, France, in 2008, and later purchased by the Victorian government.
Australia	Sydney		305	001-060	60	2017–2018	33 m (108 ft)	2.65 m (8 ft 8 3/8 in)	For CBD and South East Light Rail. Capable of both APS and pantograph power. Operate in coupled sets.
