= Valenciennes tramway =

Tram system in Valenciennes, France

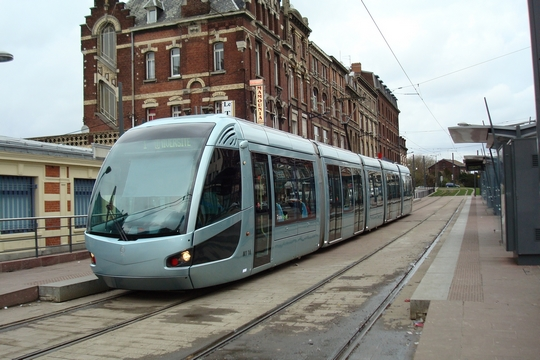

Overview
- Native name: Tramway de Valenciennes
- Owner: SIMOUV
- Locale: Valenciennes, Hauts-de-France, France
- Number of lines: 2
- Line number: T1, T2
- Number of stations: 48
- Annual ridership: 4.37 million (2018)
- Website: transvilles.com

Operation
- Began operation: 3 July 2006
- Operator: CTVH (RATP Group)

Technical
- System length: 33.8 km (21.0 mi)
- Track gauge: 1,435 mm (4 ft 8 1/2 in)

The Valenciennes tramway (French: tramway de Valenciennes) is a tram system serving Valenciennes and part of its surrounding areas, in the Nord department of France. Since 2014 the network has consisted of two lines with a total of 21.0 mi (33.8 km) of track and 48 stations.

The modern tram network, reintroducing this transport mode after its abandonment in 1966, was launched on 3 July 2006 with a first 9.5 mi (15.3 km) section from Université to Dutemple. An extension from Dutemple to Denain Espace Villars was opened on 31 August 2007. The second line between Vieux-Condé Le Boulon and Université was put into service on 24 February 2014.

The Valenciennes tramway is integrated into the wider local multimodal public transport network and its commercial brand "Transvilles". It is owned by the Syndicat intercommunal de mobilité et d'organisation urbaine du Valenciennois (SIMOUV), the Transvilles network's organising authority. Since 1 January 2015, the RATP Group, through its subsidiary Compagnie des Transports du Valenciennois et du Hainaut (CTVH), has been in charge of operation and maintenance.

== Background ==
The former Valenciennes tram network was opened in 1881, and at the peak of its development during the early 20th century, it reached the Belgian border. The region suffered from a steep decline in several of the local industries, these being mining, steel production and textiles; it was amid this climate that the original tram network was closed in July 1966.

Despite the tram network's closure, the road infrastructure of the region was not heavily developed to take over its role. Officially, buses had been adopted as the replacement for the region's former tram system. However, there was a chronic lack of a coherent road network for such services to be operated upon, the development of which having been reportedly hindered by the region's post-industrial infrastructure, and road congestion had risen to concerning levels over the years. As such, there was some level of demand for a suitable regional commuter system be deployed. During the late 1980s onwards, there was a wider revival of interest in the topic of tramways and their potential deployment, the planning authorities in Valenciennes soon became keen to embrace this notion themselves.

Opting for a revival of the tramway was not a clear-cut option; a study performed in 1991 concluded that Valenciennes could benefit from the adoption of a structuring Public Transport system, and that trams were likely to be the most suitable option. Jules Chevalier, the President of SITURV, was also personally convinced of the usefulness of a modern tramway. A project, known as Transvilles, involved a major reorganization of the public transport network across the urban area of Valenciennes, centred around the adoption of a modern tram network and a redeployment of bus lines.

It would take nearly a full decade between the official proposal for the modern tramway being released and its adoption as an active policy; this delay has been attributed to the various bureaucratic steps required for its authorisation, including the multiple local councils that had to consent to its construction. The light rail scheme was primarily sponsored by Syndicat Intercommunal des Transports Urbains de la Région de Valenciennes (SITURV) and the European Investment Bank (EIB) emerged as an important source of finance. There was considerable anti-railway lobbying from some members of the community as well. According to railway publication Rail Technology, the automotive industry was a key source of support for the relaunch of tram services, since both Peugeot Citroën (PSA) and Toyota have manufacturing plants in the area.

In 2000, approval was given to proceed with the construction of the first phase of the network, which had an estimated cost of €242.8 million. A consortium led by French rolling stock manufacturer Alstom was awarded the contract to build the system.

== Network ==
=== Phase I ===
The first section of line A (Université - Dutemple, 19 stations) opened on 3 July 2006 as line 1. It is 9.5 km long and serves five villages. The Citadis 302, produced by Alstom, was adopted as the network's rolling stock and used to transport the first passengers.

The line starts in a nearly rural area in the grounds of the University of Valenciennes and Hainaut-Cambresis, then goes north through a shopping centre and the poorer housing areas of La Briquette. It runs through the center of Valenciennes, from the Porte de Paris stop to the railway station. Originally the line was to go through the Place d'Armes in front of the town hall, but instead it uses the nearby Rue de la Vieille-Poissonnerie. Beyond the railway station, the line reaches the suburb of Anzin, where it runs through abandoned industrial areas, and then reuses the former Abscon - Saint-Waast railway line from St-Waast stop to Dutemple terminus.

A study on a single-track extension from St-Waast stop to Valenciennes hospital was carried out; however, this option was ultimately dropped in favour of an electric shuttle bus.

=== Phase II ===
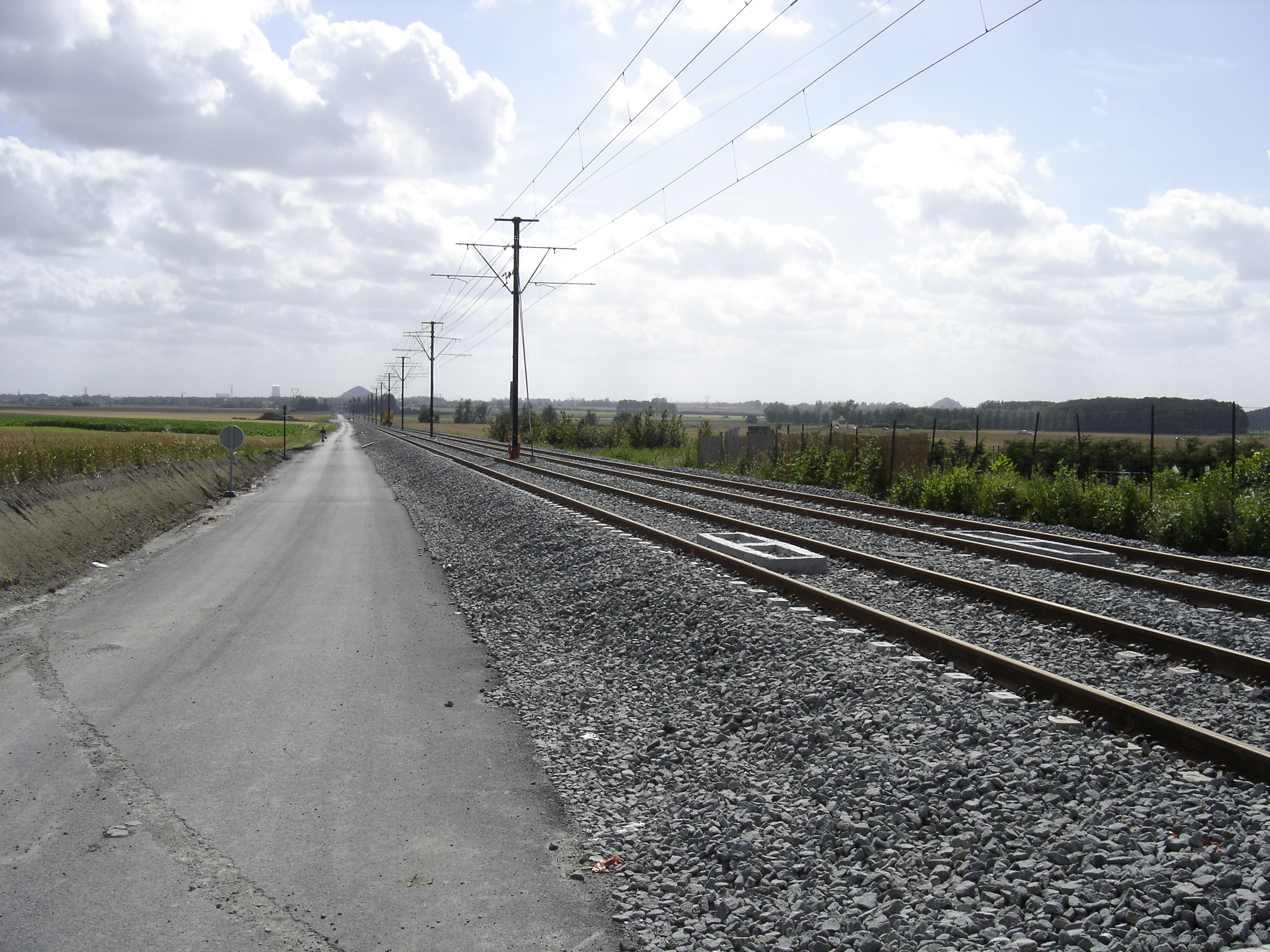
Line A crosses some countryside areas between Hérin and Denain

During this phase, Line A was extended during Phase II from Valenciennes to Denain (Dutemple - Espace Villars, eight stations) and this extension was formally opened on 31 August 2007. Commercial services began three days later. It is 8.8 km long.

The second largest town in the Valenciennes area, Denain has historically sought to improve its transport capacity. The line reuses a 6.5 km long section of the former railway from Denain to Valenciennes, which was one of the oldest railways in France (line Abscon - Saint-Waast: opened in 1838). The cost of the Phase II extension was €69 million.

One additional intermediate station, Les Grémonts, was added in a second phase. The Solange Tonini station was added in September 2008 and the Allende station was renamed Jean Dulieu. In July 2009, the station La Plaine was added north of Dutemple. In August 2010, the line 1 was redesignated, becoming line A.

=== Phase III ===
Phase III opened in February 2014. Known as line C, this route runs between Anzin and Vieux-Condé. Construction commenced in September 2011 and was completed in December 2013.

In October 2010, Alstom won a contract to supply seven Citadis trams for use on line 2. Ultimately, Alstom delivered nine additional Citadis vehicles for used upon the second line of Valenciennes tram network during December 2013.

=== Phase IV ===
Phase IV, line D Valenciennes - Crespin, study under way, scheduled later.

== Operations ==
In advance of each journey on the tramway, passengers buy tickets via purpose-built ticket machines at each tram stop; these tickets are checked by onboard revenue protection inspectors. All tram stops feature displays giving up-to-date service information. Auditory and visual service alerts are routinely given onboard the trams as well; onboard CCTV systems also allow for the activities onboard each tram to be inspected.

The Citadis trams, manufactured by Alstom, have low floors and double doors, which are claimed to enable rapid boarding and disembarking of passengers. In their usual service configuration, each vehicle comprises five sections and can carry 295 passengers; additional sections can be added should additional capacity be required at a later date. For reasons of driver comfort, the cabs are air conditioned. To date, all tram vehicles are identically configured, later-built units having no demonstrable difference in fittings or operational practice from their predecessors.

The signalling and control systems are completely integrated. Signalling has been provided for on the trams, despite the fact that the vehicles are run upon entirely reserved tracks and absolute priority is granted to the tramway over all other forms of transport at any crossing; signs and warning signals to this affect have been installed at each of the network's many road intersections. As a rule of thumb, akin to many of France's other tramways, the routes of the Valencienne tramway have intentionally used dedicated routes wherever possible; as such, lines often run over grassed areas and minimal contact with the road network is made.

Deliberate efforts have been made by the region's transport planners to integrate the tram network with other means of transport, such as the regional bus networks and the heavy rail station operated by SNCF. Hence many of the tram stops have been sited alongside these other services. Several park-and-ride sites encourage commuters to use the tram. Maintenance and management are based at a purpose-built combined depot and control centre close to the Saint Waast stop.

Transvilles has developed several marketing strategies for the purpose of increasing passengers, including active customer relationship management via its own website and personalised messages on social media. It has issued various scholarships, bursaries and mentoring to students at the ENSIAME school of engineering. The organisation has also given concessions to various local, cultural and charitable concerns. In one case, jobseekers registered with the Pôle Emploi unemployment agency are given a free monthly transit pass upon securing a new job; Anne-Lise Dufour, president of SITURV, stated of this policy: "It's a priceless help that first month before the first paycheck rolls in".

== Future extensions ==
Beyond lines C and D, the following extensions are envisaged:

- from Denain to Douchy-les-Mines: the terminus of line A at Espace Villars in Denain provides the right orientation towards the city of Douchy-les-Mines.
- towards Raismes: along avenue Anatole-France to place de Raismes. The three-way junction in Anzin may be difficult, so it will be necessary to use either the Raismes branch or the Vieux-Condé branch (Line C) as a shuttle.

== See also ==
- Trams in France
- List of town tramway systems in France
