= Cuenca Tramway =

Light rail line in Cuenca, Ecuador

Cuenca Tramway (Tranvía de Cuenca)
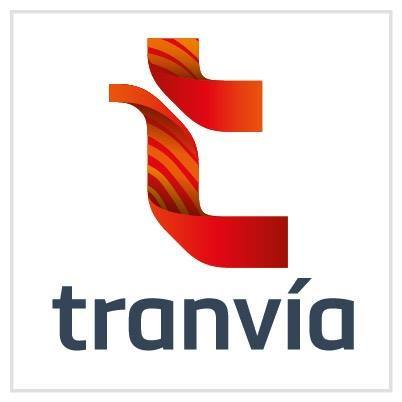

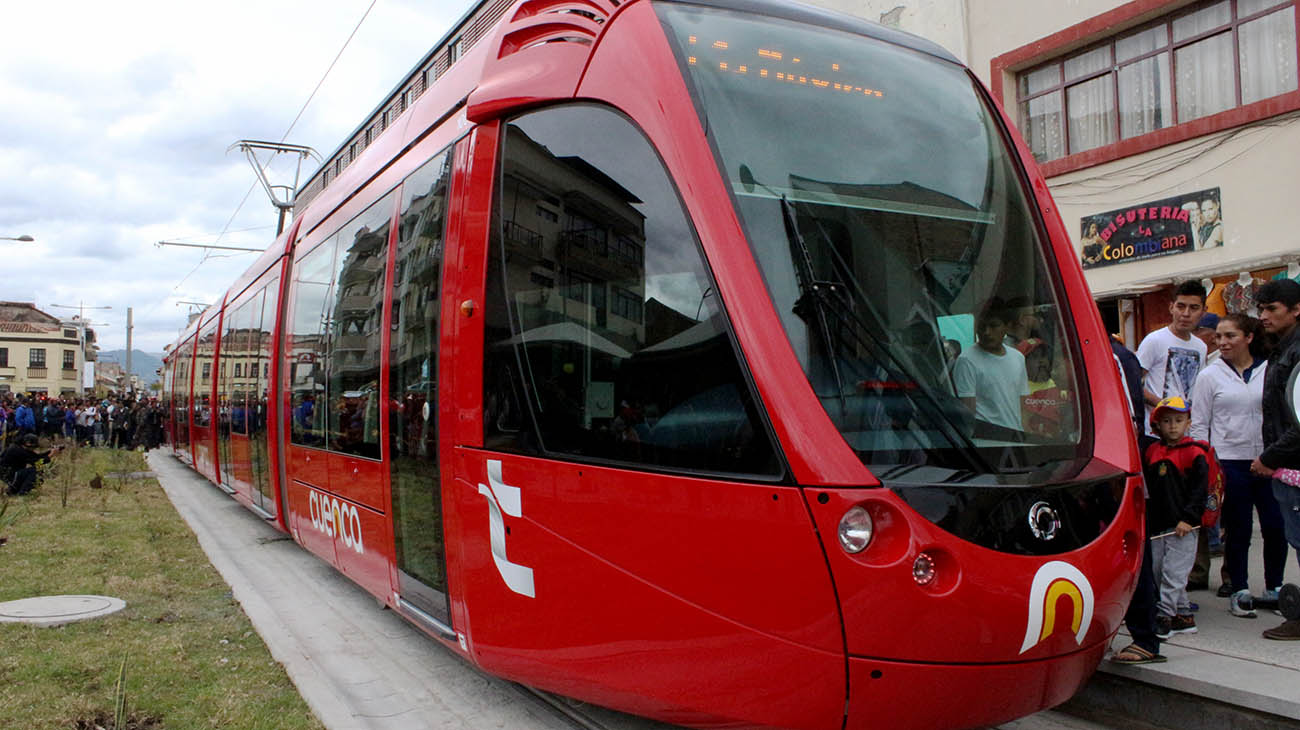
- Car 1001 of the Tranvía de Cuenca during tests in July 2018

Overview
- Locale: Cuenca, Ecuador
- Transit type: Light rail
- Number of lines: 1
- Number of stations: 27
- Daily ridership: 19,000

Operation
- Began operation: 25 May 2020
- Number of vehicles: 14

Technical
- System length: 10.7 km (6.6 mi)
- Track gauge: 1,435 mm (4 ft 8 1/2 in) standard gauge

The Cuenca Tramway (Spanish: Tranvía de Cuenca) is a tram line in the Ecuadorian city of Cuenca. While the FCCA operates conventional trains at a higher elevation, It is one of the highest street railways in the Americas, and possibly the world, on par with Bolivia's Mi Tren.

== Background ==
Construction began in November 2013, with the city of Cuenca signing a US$142.6m contract with the CITA Cuenca consortium, which is led by Alstom and includes CIM, Ineo, and TSO, the same year. Testing of the tramway's Alstom Citadis rolling stock on the southernmost part of the line began in 2015, and test runs over the full route began in July 2018.

In September 2018 an agreement with Metro Tenerife was signed by Cuenca municipality to operate the tramway.

== Route ==
The 10.7 km route begins at Parque Industrial and ends at Rio Tarqui, passing through the historic center, and as of 2018 was forecast to carry 120,000 daily passengers.

== See also ==
- Quito Metro
- Empresa de Ferrocarriles Ecuatorianos
