= Constantine Cable Car =

Gondola lift in Constantine, Algeria (opened 2008)

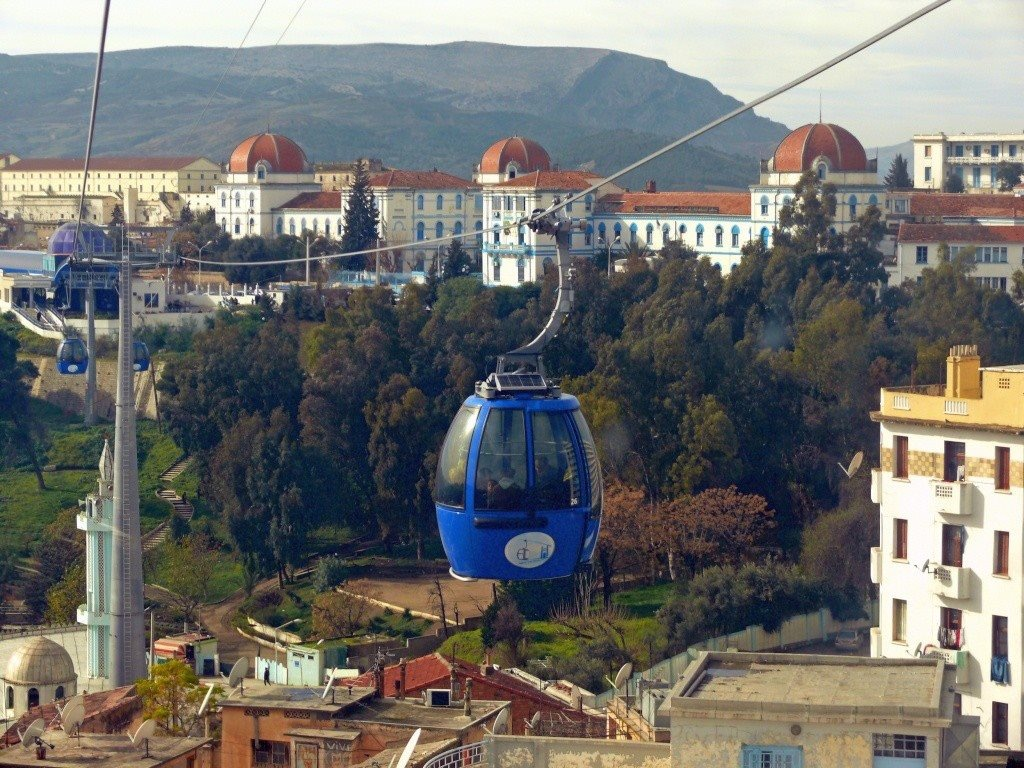
- Interactive map of Constantine Cable Car

Overview
- Location: Constantine, Algeria
- Country: Algeria
- Coordinates: 36°22′11″N 6°36′53″E
- No. of stations: 3
- Open: June 2008

Operation
- Operator: Algiers Metro
- No. of carriers: 33
- Carrier capacity: 15
- Trip duration: 7 minutes

Technical features
- Aerial lift type: Bi-cable gondola detachable
- Manufactured by: Doppelmayr Garaventa Group
- Line length: 3,300 feet (1,000 m)
- Operating speed: 14 mph (23 km/h)
- Vertical Interval: 500 feet (150 m)

The Constantine Gondola lift (French: Télécabine de Constantine) is a gondola lift, situated in Constantine in Algeria. It carries commuters through the gorges of the Rhumel River to link the eastern part of the city at the place Tatache Belkacem (formerly rue Thiers) to the west in the city Emir Abdelkader, to the University Hospital Ben Badis. Opened in June 2008, it has 33 detachable cabins with 15 seats each, connecting the two terminals in 8 minutes and can carry up to 2,000 people per hour.

== The Stations ==
=== Station Tannoudji (AEK City, driving station) ===
- - Altitude: 707 meters
- - Total area: 2480 m^{2}
- - The resort area: 1680 m^{2}
- - Surface parking areas: 800 m^{2}

=== Station CHU (middle station) ===
- - Altitude: 675 meters
- - Total area: 1820 m^{2}

=== Tatache Station Place (reference station) ===
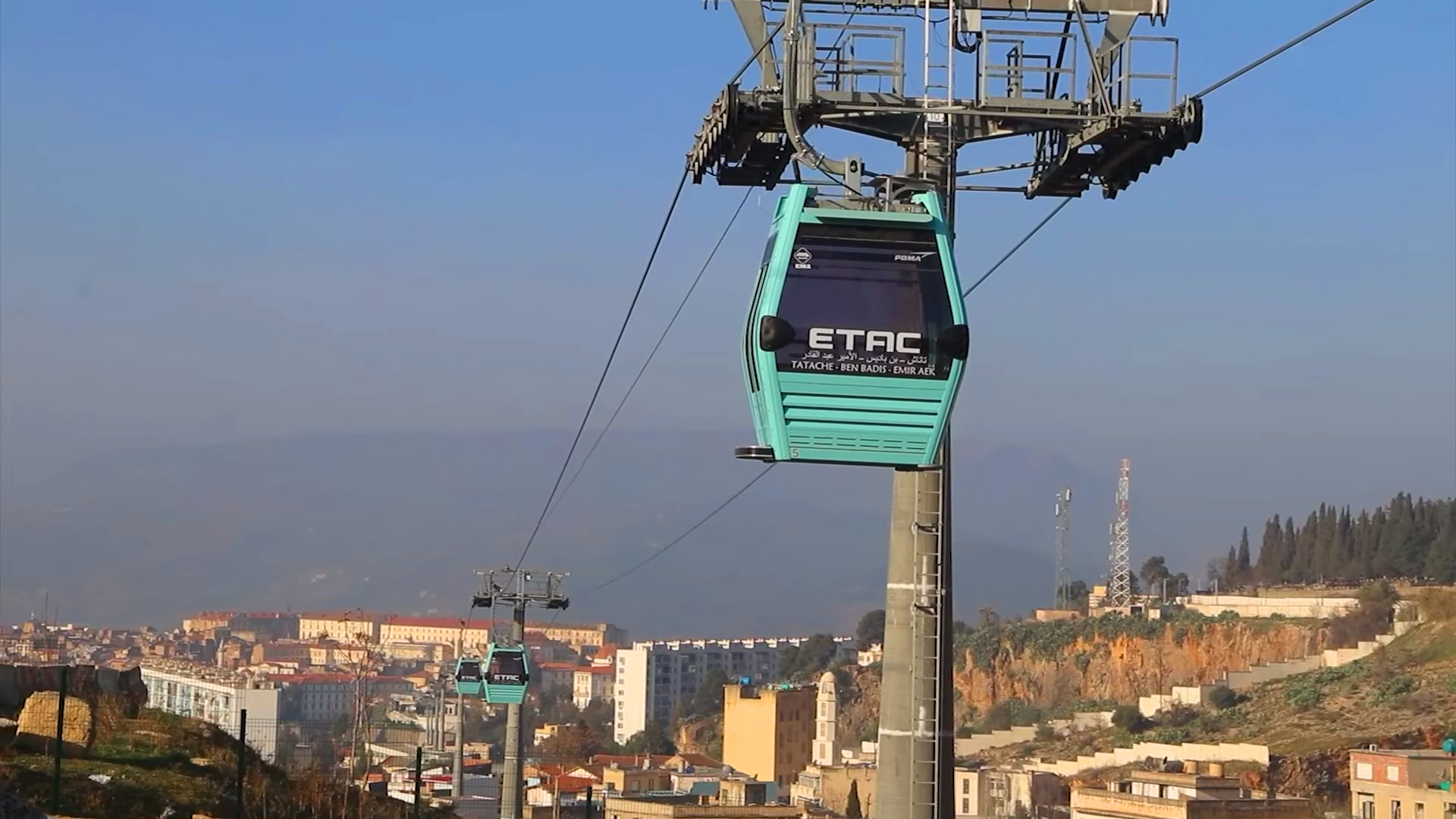
The new Constantine Cable Car during technical test in 2024.

- - Altitude: 619.29 m
- - Total area: 1700 m^{2}
- - The resort area: 1400 m^{2}
- - Surface parking areas: 300 m^{2}

== Length of lines ==
- Length of the line Tatache Place - CHU: 425 meters.
- Length of the line CHU - AEK City: 1092 meters.

== See also ==
- Constantine tramway
- There are Gondola lifts comparables in the cities of Tlemcen (Algeria) and Skikda (Algeria).
