= Transport in Orléans =

Orléans is a city in Loiret, France. The city is located 130 kilometres (81 mi) south west of Paris. The city has a population of 116,000 and the metropolitan area has a population of nearly 450,000 people.

== Urban transport ==
=== Bus ===
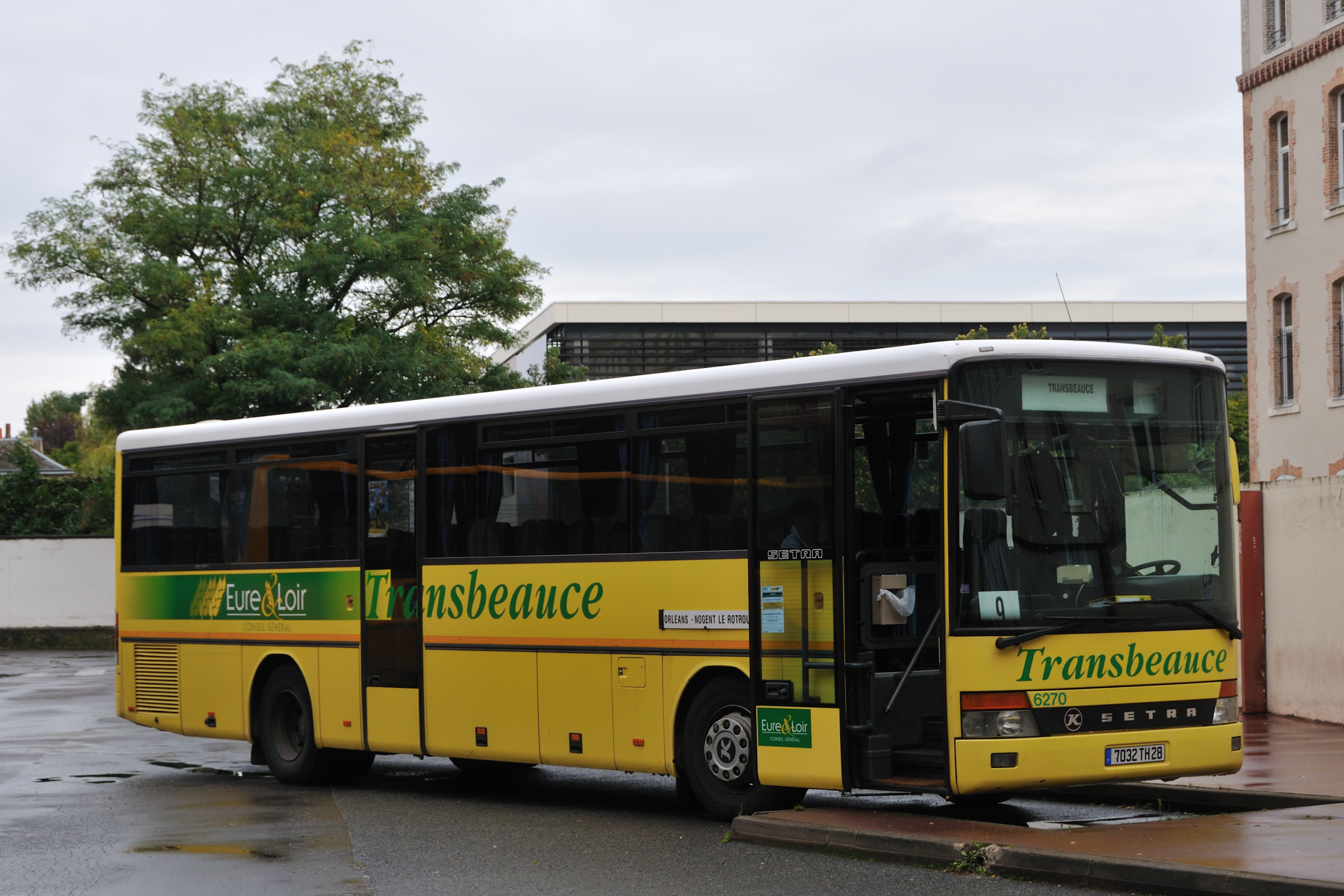
A coach for a regional service

Bus services in Orléans are provided by TAO. They serve most areas of the city and outskirts. Services 1, 2, 3, 4, 5, 6, 7, 8, 9, 10, 20, 21 and 26 all serve Orléans station and bus 6 serves Les-Aubrais station.

=== Tram ===
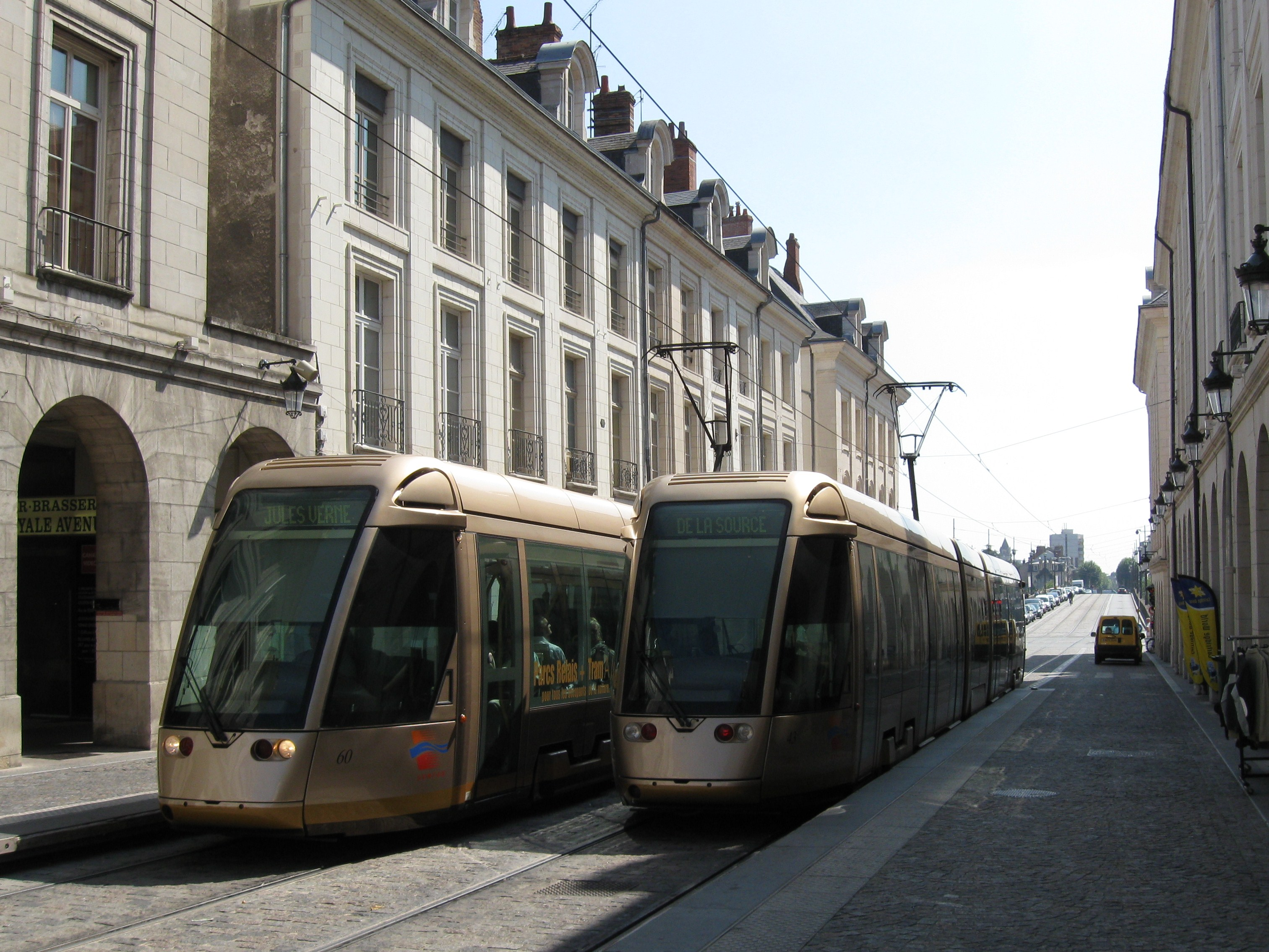
Trams in Orléans

Line A opened in 2000 and operates from Les Aubrais in the north to Hôpital de la Source in the south. The tram serves both Orléans railway station and Fleury-Les Aubrais-Orléans. The tram serves the city centre, Olivet and also serves the University of Orléans.

== Longer distance transport ==
=== Car ===
Orléans is well connected to the French motorway network. The A10 Motorway (Paris - Bordeaux), the A71 Motorway (Orléans - Clermont-Ferrand) and A19 Motorway (Sens - Artenay). It is also close to National route 20 from Paris to Spain.

=== Rail ===
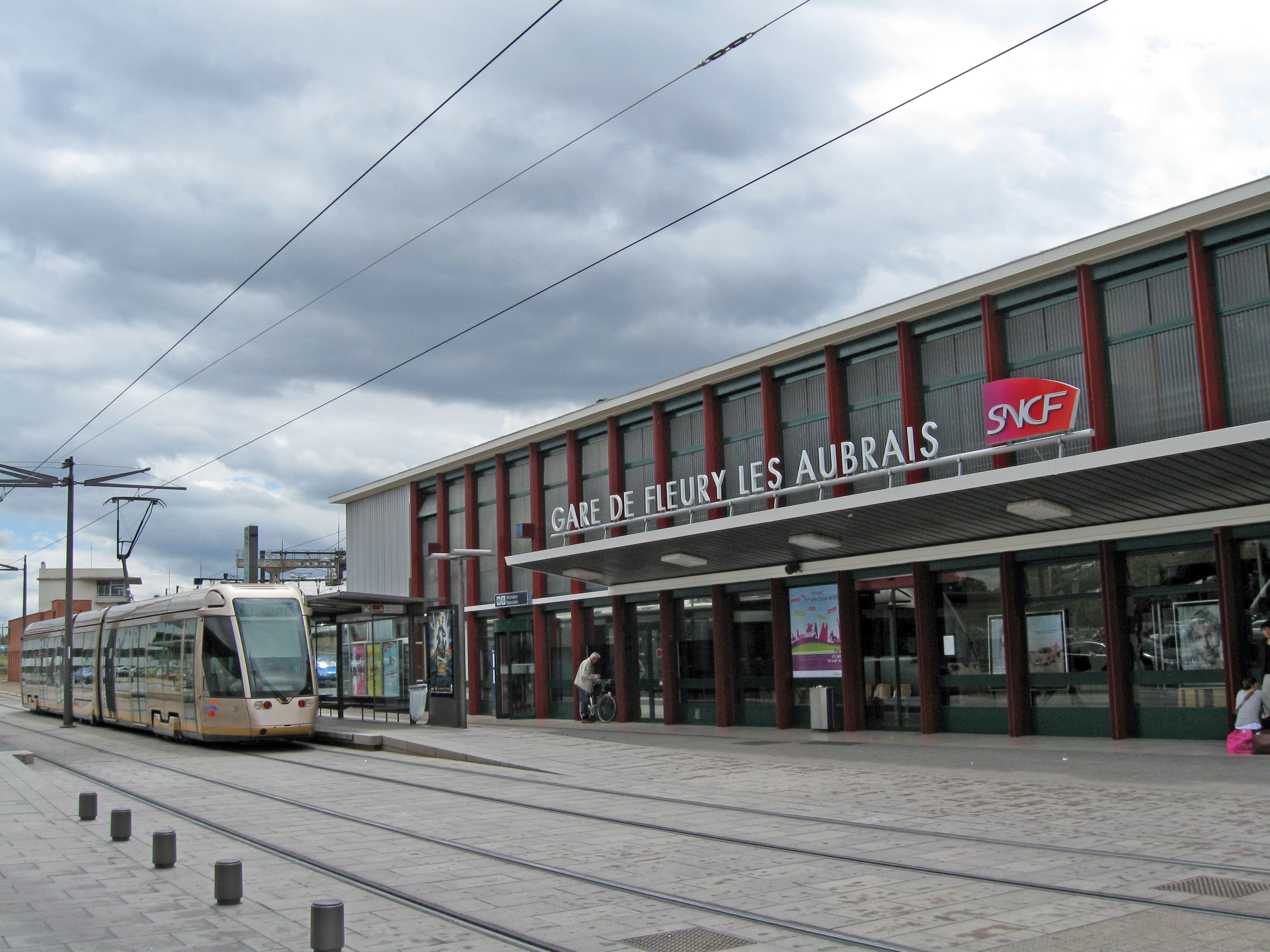
Fleury-Les Aubrais-Orléans station

Orléans railway station is a modern station in the city centre. The station is served by trains to Paris, Angers, Blois, Bourges, Nantes, Nevers, Tours and Vierzon.

The main station for long distance services is Fleury-Les Aubrais-Orléans which lies 3 kilometres (1.9 mi) to the north of the city. The station is served by trains to Paris, Blois, Bourges, Brive-la-Gaillarde, Limoges, Nevers, Perpignan, Toulouse, Tours and Vierzon.

Train services are operated by SNCF.

=== Air ===
The nearest international flights are from Paris-Orly Airport approximately 97 kilometres (60 mi) away, Tours Val de Loire Airport approximately 103 kilometres (64 mi) away and Paris-Charles de Gaulle Airport approximately 131 kilometres (81 mi) away.
