= Oran tramway =

Tram network serving Oran, Algeria since 2013

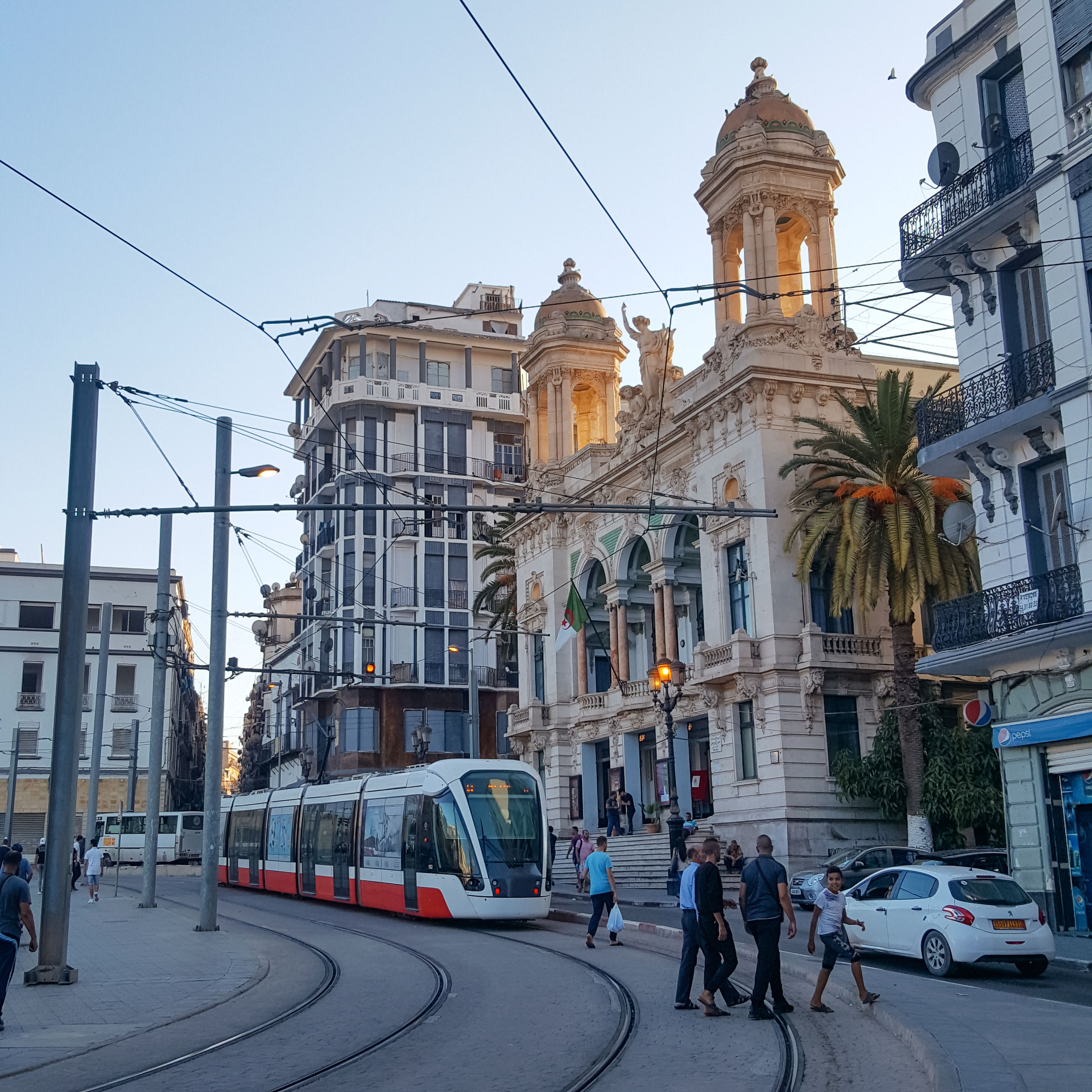

Overview
- Native name: ترامواي وهران
- Owner: Entreprise Métro d'Alger (EMA)
- Locale: Oran, Algeria
- Transit type: Tram
- Number of lines: 1
- Number of stations: 32
- Website: https://setram.dz/nos-reseaux/ORN

Operation
- Began operation: 1 May 2013
- Operator: Société d'exploitation des tramways (SETRAM)

Technical
- System length: 18.7 km (11.6 mi)
- Track gauge: 1,435 mm (4 ft 8 1/2 in) standard gauge
System map

The Oran tramway (French: Tramway d'Oran; Arabic: ترامواي وهران) is an 18.7 km (11.6 mi) long tramway network serving Oran (also transliterated as Wahrān), the second largest city in Algeria. Opened in 2013, the tramway is operated by the Société d'Exploitation des Tramways (SETRAM) and owned by the Entreprise Métro d'Alger (EMA). The network's single line runs from the city centre east to Sidi Maarouf, and south to Es Senia. There are four extensions planned as of 2025.

== History ==
=== Original network (1899-1951) ===
As a historical and modern centre for trade and industry, Oran was the only city outside of the capital Algiers to build electric trams during the French colonial era.

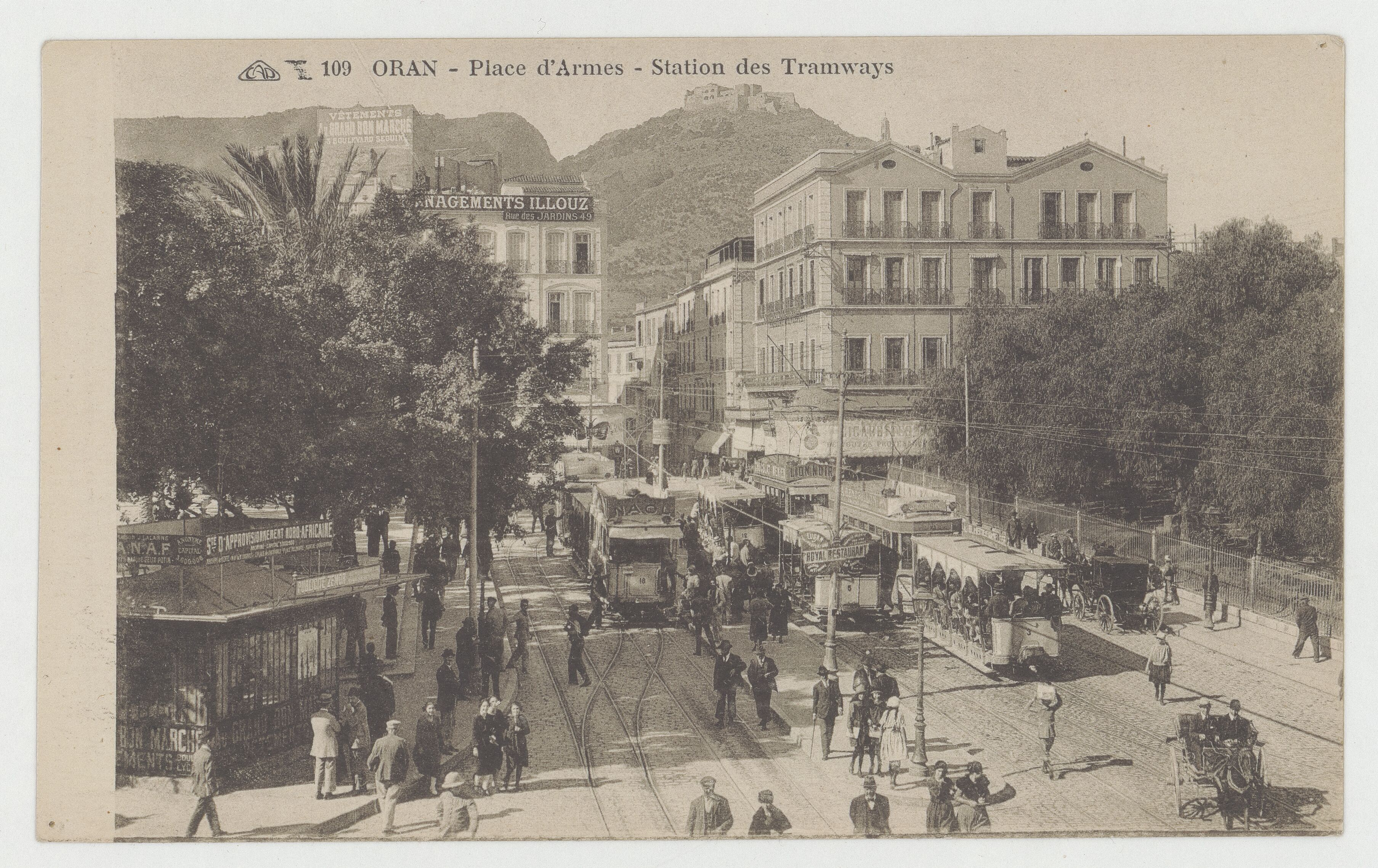
Trams at the Place d'Armes (now the Place 1er Novembre), 1910s

Concessions for a tramway in Oran were first awarded in 1897, with the network being declared a public utility in June 1898. The first tram line entered service on February 3, 1899. Operated by the Compagnie des tramways électriques d'Oran (TEO), the tram network reached a total length of around 50 km (31 mi) at its peak in the 1900s. With a track gauge of 1055 mm, a total of nine city lines and one interurban line were built, all of which radiated from the Place d'Armes (now the Place 1er Novembre) in the city centre outwards. However, the trams would be short-lived, and by 1939 some of the city lines had already been replaced by trolleybuses. The interurban line, which ran for 16 km (9.9 mi) from Oran to Aïn-el-Turk, was also replaced by buses by the time of the Second World War. The last tramway line closed on December 2, 1951.

=== Modern network ===
Feasibility studies for a new tramway in Oran were started in 2006, when the Entreprise Métro d'Alger (EMA) entrusted the studies to the French company Ingérop, with preliminary design studies later being carried out by the Ensistrans design office group.

In November 2007, the EMA awarded the contract for construction of the tramway to the Tramnour consortium consisting of Alstom and Isolux Corsán. The tramway would be built as a turnkey project, with Alstom supplying the tram vehicles and the signalling and telecommunications equipment, as well as the depot equipment, and construction of the substations, while Isolux Corsán would carry out the civil engineering works, the laying of track, and construction of the overhead power supply.

The first stone of the tram project was laid near the Sidi Maarouf depot by Algerian president Abdelaziz Bouteflika on December 16, 2008, marking the start of construction. Commissioning of the tramway was originally meant to take place 26 months after construction began, however by early 2009 delays in construction were already being reported. Despite the delays encountered during construction, work on the line continued and in 2011, the first of the 30 Alstom Citadis 302 tram vehicles ordered was delivered.

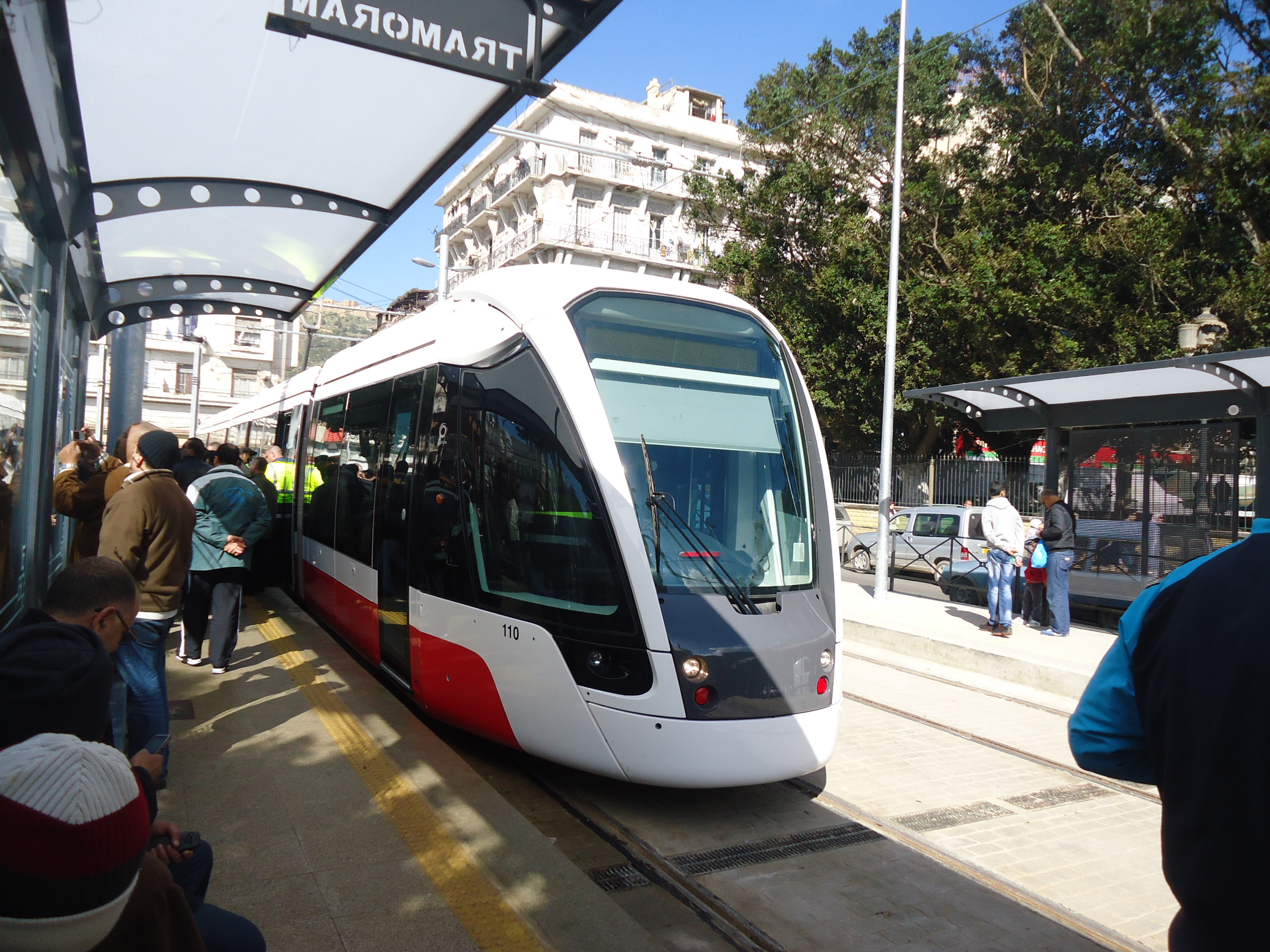
A tram in the city centre during the start of non-commercial operation, March 2013

Test running on the tramway began on February 20, 2012, when the first run was conducted over a length of 100 metres (330 ft). Testing continued throughout 2012, and by the end of the year, test trams were running between the eastern terminus at Sidi Maarouf to the Place 1er Novembre. Non-commercial operation on the entire tramway line, from Sidi Maarouf to Es Senia, began on March 2, 2013.

The tramway was officially inaugurated on May 1, 2013, with public revenue services starting the next day.

== System ==
=== Route and infrastructure ===
The tramway network comprises a single line of 18.7 km (11.6 mi) of track and 32 stations. The line runs on an east-west alignment from its eastern terminus at Gare Routière Sidi Maarouf station west to the Place 1er Novembre (1st November Square) in Oran's city centre, before turning south and running to Es Senia, where it terminates. The route connects the city centre with two of Oran's universities, as well as the main railway station and the city's eastern and southern suburbs, largely following the route of the original tram network, with the entire section south of Place 1er Novembre running on the alignment formerly occupied by the original tramway.

The line runs at-grade for most of its route, and is entirely on its own reserved right-of-way separate from other vehicle traffic, although it has several level crossings for road vehicles. There are also some short bridges on the line over main roads and roundabouts to facilitate grade separation on the line.

Between the Emir Abdelkader and Place Mokrani stops within Oran's city centre, there is a single-track loop which allows westbound trams arriving from Sidi Maarouf to turn around at Place 1er Novembre and return to the east. Although the loop is not used regularly, it may be in service during disruptions or used by peak-hour trams.

The main tram depot is located at the eastern end of the line in Sidi Maarouf, however there are also extra sidings at the Es Senia terminus where several trams are stored as well. As with all other Algerian tram systems, the line runs on standard-gauge (1435 mm) tracks, with electric power being supplied by a 750 V DC overhead wire.

=== Stations ===
Geographical route map with stations

The stations are listed from the southwestern suburbs to the northeastern suburbs:

| | Stations | Commune served | Connections |
|---|---|---|---|
| ■ | Es Sénia Terminus - السانيا نهاية الخط | Es Sénia |
| ● | Es Sénia Sud - السانيا جنوب | Es Sénia |
| ● | Es Sénia Centre - السانيا وسط | Es Sénia |
| ● | Moulay Abdelkader - مولاي عبد القادر | Es Sénia |
| ● | IGMO Université Docteur TALEB - جامعة الدكتور طالب | Oran |
| ● | Cité Volontaire ENSET - الحي الجامعي المتطوع | Oran |
| ● | Lycée les Palmiers - ثانوية النخيل | Oran |
| ● | Jardin Othmania - حديقة العثمانية | Oran |
| ● | Cité Universitaire - Hai el Badr - الحي الجامعي بدر | Oran |
| ● | Sureté de la Wilaya - BD ANP - نهج جيش التحرير الوطني | Oran |
| ● | Palais des Sports - قصر الرياضات | Oran |
| ● | Ghaouti - Dar el Hayat - دار الحياة | Oran |
| ● | M'dina Eldjadida - المدينة الجديدة | Oran |
| ● | Houha Tlemcen - حوحة تلمسان | Oran |
| ● | Place Mokrani - ساحة المقراني | Oran |
| ● | Place 1er Novembre - ساحة أول نوفمبر | Oran |
| ● | Emir Abdelkader - الأمير عبد القادر | Oran |
| ● | Gare SNTF - محطة السكك الحديدية | Oran | SNTF |
| ● | Bd Colonel A Benabderezzak - نهج العقيد أحمد بن عبد الرزاق | Oran |
| ● | Les Frères Moulay - الإخوة مولاي | Oran |
| ● | Maalem Bentayeb - معلم بن طيب | Oran |
| ● | Les Castors - حي كاستور | Oran |
| ● | Mosquée Ibn Badis - جامع ابن باديس | Oran |
| ● | Palais de Justice - قصر العدالة | Oran |
| ● | Carrefour les 3 Cliniques - ثلاثة عيادات | Oran |
| ● | Cité USTO - حي إيسطو | Oran |
| ● | Hôpital 1er Novembre - المستشفى الجامعي أول نوفمبر | Oran |
| ● | Université USTO - جامعة إيسطو | Oran |
| ● | USTO- Bifurcation - Bd Pépinière - نهج المشتلة | Oran |
| ● | Cite El Yasmine- حي الياسمين | Bir El Djir |
| ● | Hai Es Sabah - حي الصباح | Bir El Djir |
| ■ | Gare Routière Sidi Maarouf - محطة سيدي معروف | Bir El Djir | SNTF |

== Rolling stock ==
The tramway fleet consists of 51 5-section Alstom Citadis 302 trams, although this total is further divided into two separate orders.

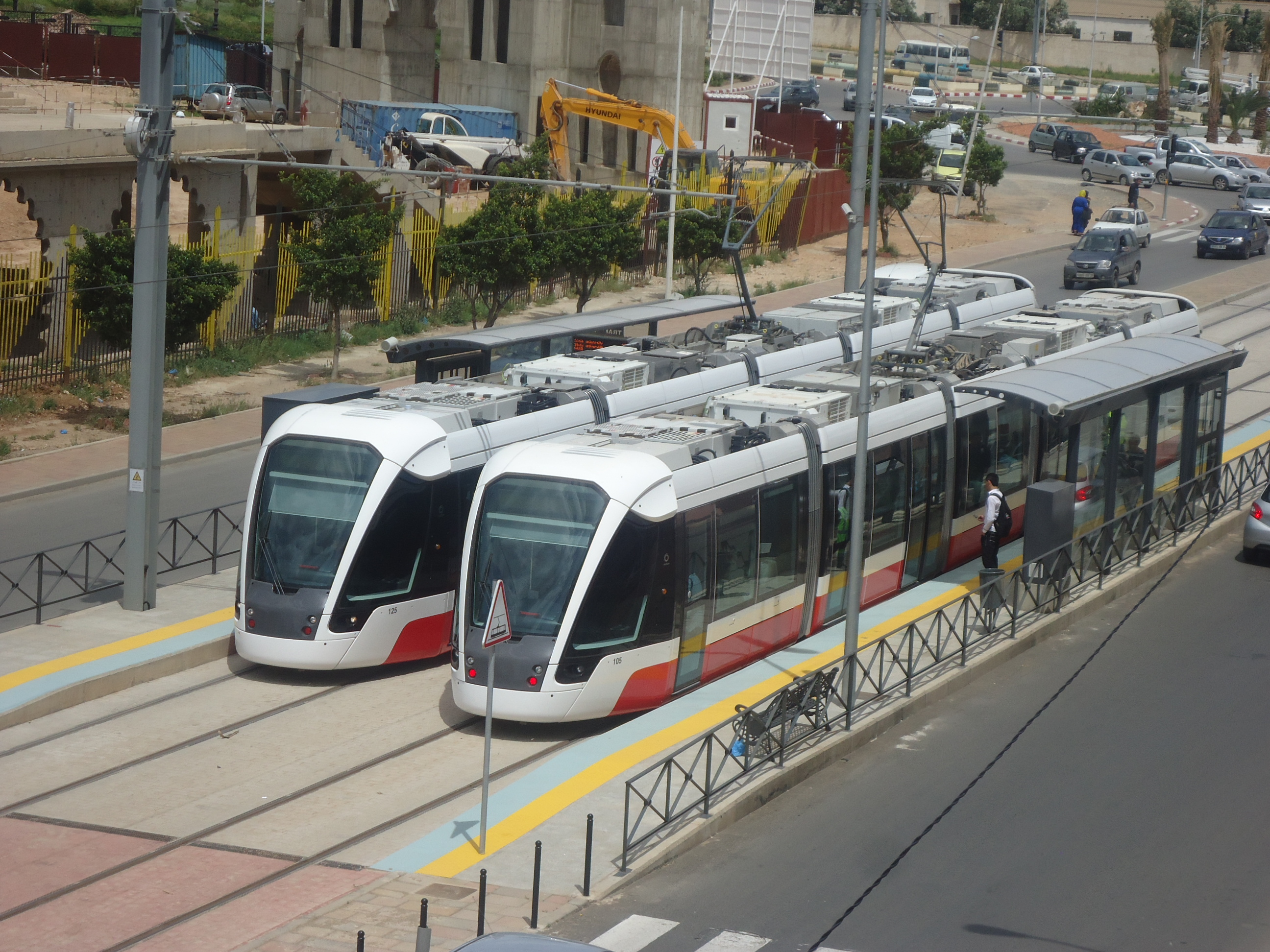
Trams #105 and #125 at Mosquée Ibn Badis station, May 2013

The first series of 30 Citadis 302 trams were ordered as part of the contract for the tramway's construction in 2007, and manufactured at the Alstom factory in Barcelona, Spain. Delivery of the vehicles lasted throughout 2011. The low-floor trams were designed by the French agency RCP Design Global, and are each 32.5 metres (107 ft) in length.

The second series of 21 Citadis 302 trams were built in anticipation for the future lines and extensions that would be added to the tram network. They are mechanically and visually similar to the first series, however they differ in their place of manufacture: instead of being built by Alstom, the trams of the second series were assembled locally in Annaba, Algeria by the Cital joint-venture. The first tram was delivered on February 10, 2016, however seven of the 21 trams built have not yet been delivered, as they are only required for the new lines.

| Fleet numbers | Manufacturer/assembler | Year(s) built | Place of origin | Notes |
|---|---|---|---|---|
| 101-130 | Alstom | 2011 | Spain | Tram #129 scrapped after a derailment in 2016 |
| 131-151 | Cital | 2016-2017 | Algeria | Tram #133 renumbered #129 |

== Planned lines and extensions ==
As of 2025, there are four extensions that are planned, but on hold:

- USTO Bifurcation/Bd Pepinière - Bir El Djir (8.3 km (5.2 mi))
- USTO Bifurcation/Bd Pepinière - Bir El Djir via Belgaid (8.0 km (5.0 mi))
- Gare Routière Hattab - Haï Ben Arba (8.6 km (5.3 mi))
- Es Senia Terminus - Ahmed Ben Bella International Airport (4.6 km (2.9 mi)).

Plans for these extensions have existed since the tramway opened in 2013, and switches and tracks for the lines starting at USTO Bifrucation/Blvd Pepinière have been installed, however all lines remain on hold as of 2025, with no planned date for the start of construction.

== Operation ==
The Oran Tramway is operated by Algeria's Société d'exploitation des tramways (SETRAM), a joint venture between the French state-owned RATP Dev (a subsidiary of the RATP Group), Entreprise de transport urbain et suburbain d'Alger (ETUSA), and Entreprise Métro d'Alger (EMA), of which RATP Dev is a 49% shareholder, and mainly responsible for operating the Oran Tramway, as well as other trams in Algeria.

Since March 2023, when RATP Dev sold its shares in the company to the Algerian Ministry of Transport, SETRAM has been a fully state-owned company.

== See also ==
- List of town tramway systems in Africa
- List of tram and light rail transit systems
