= List of town tramway systems in Ukraine =

This is a list of town tramway systems in Ukraine by oblast. It includes all tram systems, past and present; cities with currently operating systems are indicated in bold. A diamond (♦) symbol indicates where there were (or are) two or more independent tram systems operating concurrently within a single metropolitan area. Those tram systems that operated on other than standard gauge track (where known) are indicated in the Notes column.

== Chernihiv Oblast ==
Name of System	Location	Traction Type	Date (From)	Date (To)	Notes
Trams in Nizhyn	Nizhyn	Horse	1915	1920s?	

== Chernivtsi Oblast ==
Name of System	Location	Traction Type	Date (From)	Date (To)	Notes
Trams in Chernivtsi	Chernivtsi	Electric	18 Jul 1897	20 Mar 1967	Gauge: 1,067 mm (3 ft 6 in)

== Autonomous Republic of Crimea ==
Name of system	Location	Traction type	Date (from)	Date (to)	Notes
**Trams in Yevpatoria**	**Yevpatoria**	Electric	23 May 1914	-	Gauge: 1,000 mm (3 ft 3 3/8 in). Note for Yevpatoria: Operation suspended 1919–1923 because of war. Operated only during summer season, 1923–1941. Operation suspended 1941–1944 because of war. Operation resumed 1944, then suspended 1944–1947.
	Kerch	Electric	7 Nov 1935	Nov 1941	Gauge: 1,524 mm (5 ft); Operation suspended because of war, not restored.
	Molochne	Electric	18 Aug 1989	Aug 2014	Gauge: 1,000 mm (3 ft 3 3/8 in). Note for Molochne: Built by the Pension Bérégovoy resort to provide transportation between the guest-house complex and the beach (on the Black Sea). Operates only during summer season.
	Simferopol	Electric	13 Aug 1914	1 Dec 1970	Gauge: 1,000 mm (3 ft 3 3/8 in); Operation suspended 1941 (or 1942) – 1944 because of war.

== Dnipropetrovsk Oblast ==
Name of system	Location	Traction type	Date (from)	Date (to)	Notes
**Trams in Kamianske**	**Kamianske**	Electric	27 Nov 1935	-	Gauge: 1,524 mm (5 ft)
**Trams in Dnipro**	**Dnipro**	Electric	26 Jun 1897	-	Gauge: 1,524 mm (5 ft); Operation suspended Oct 1919 – Sep 1921 because of war.
**Trams in Kryvyi Rih**	**Kryvyi Rih**	Electric	2 Jan 1935	-	Gauge: 1,524 mm (5 ft); Operation suspended Aug 1941 – 6 Nov 1946 because of war. Express tramway opened 26 Dec 1986 (see Kryvyi Rih Metrotram).

== Donetsk Oblast ==
Name of system	Location	Traction type	Date (from)	Date (to)	Notes
Trams in Avdiivka	Avdiivka	Electric	23 Aug 1965	Jan 2017	Gauge: 1,524 mm (5 ft); From Jan 2017 on, operation is suspended due to the War in Donbas.
**Trams in Donetsk**	**Donetsk**	Electric	15 Jun 1928	-	Gauge: 1,524 mm (5 ft)
**Trams in Druzhkivka**	**Druzhkivka**	Electric	5 Dec 1945	-	Gauge: 1,524 mm (5 ft)
**Trams in Horlivka**	**Horlivka**	Electric	7 Nov 1932	-	Gauge: 1,524 mm (5 ft); Operation suspended Nov 1941 – 10 May 1945 because of war.
Trams in Kostiantynivka	Kostiantynivka	Electric	23 Aug 1931	26 Dec 2016	Operation suspended Oct 1941 – 1 May 1944 and Jun 2004 – 2008. Unconnected line opened 1933, connected to original system 1965. Reopening in 2008.
Trams in Kramatorsk	Kramatorsk	Electric	12 May 1937	1 Aug 2017	Gauge: 1,524 mm (5 ft)
Trams in Makiivka	Makiivka	Electric	21 Aug 1927	3 Jul 2006	Gauge: 1,524 mm (5 ft)
	♦ Shchyhlivka	Electric	23 Nov 1924; 1956	1941	Reopened and connected with the main Makiivka system, 1956.
**Trams in Mariupol**	**Mariupol**	Electric	1 May 1933; 2 May 2023	2 March 2022	Gauge: 1,524 mm (5 ft); Destroyed by Russians during the Siege of Mariupol in the 2022 Russian invasion of Ukraine; Reopened in 2023.
Trams in Sviatohirsk	Sviatohirsk	Petrol (gasoline) traction	1930(?)	1941	
	Sloviansk	Steam	1894	1941(?)	
Trams in Vuhlehirsk	Vuhlehirsk	Electric	10 Nov 1958	28 Jun 1980	Gauge: 1,524 mm (5 ft)
**Trams in Yenakiieve**	**Yenakiieve**	Electric	24 May 1932	-	Gauge: 1,524 mm (5 ft); Operation suspended Nov 1941 – 8 Sep 1944 because of war.

== Kharkiv Oblast ==
Name of system	Location	Traction type	Date (from)	Date (to)	Notes
**Trams in Kharkiv**	**Kharkiv**	Horse	24 Sep 1882	?	
**Trams in Kharkiv**	**Kharkiv**	Electric	16 Jul 1906	-	Gauge: 1,524 mm (5 ft); Operation suspended 1 Jan 1920 – Jun 1921 because of war.

== Kirovohrad Oblast ==
Name of System	Location	Traction Type	Date (From)	Date (To)	Notes
Trams in Kirovohrad	Kropyvnytskyi (then Kirovohrad)	Electric	25 Jul 1897	Aug 1941(?)	Gauge: 1,000 mm (3 ft 3 3/8 in); Operation suspended because of war, not restored.

== Kyiv Municipality ==
Name of system	Location	Traction type	Date (from)	Date (to)	Notes
**Trams in Kyiv**	**Kyiv**	Horse	11 Aug 1891	1896	
**Trams in Kyiv**	**Kyiv**	Steam	19 Feb 1892	1904	
**Trams in Kyiv**	**Kyiv**	Electric	13 Jun 1892	-	Gauge: 1,524 mm (5 ft); First electric tramway in Russian Empire (and thus in Ukraine). Express tramway opened 1979.
	♦ Darnytsia	Petrol (gasoline)	May 1912	1934	Operation suspended 1920–1925.
	♦ Darnytsia	Electric	1926		Connected to main Kyiv system 1925. (Darnytsya is on the left bank of the Dnieper River. Tramway segment on Paton Bridge closed 9 Jun 2004, dividing the Kyiv system into two portions.)
	♦ Demiivka	Electric	1909; 1926	1919 ?	Connected with main Kyiv system 1926.
	♦ Sviatoshyn	Horse	1898	1901	
	♦ Sviatoshyn	Electric	1901	?	Connected with main Kyiv system 1923.
	♦ Darnytsia - Brovary	Petrol (gasoline)	1912	1934	

== Luhansk Oblast ==
Name of System	Location	Traction Type	Date (From)	Date (To)	Notes
**Trams in Luhansk**	**Luhansk**	Electric	3 May 1934	15 Jul 2014	Gauge: 1,524 mm (5 ft); Operation suspended Aug 1942 – 25 Mar 1944 because of war. Temporary suspension of operation because of Russian invasion 2014 changed to perpetual.
	♦ Kamianyi Brid	Electric	May 1935	18 February 2008	Operation suspended Aug 1942 – 25 Mar 1944 because of war. Connected with main Luhansk system 1965, disconnected and closed down in 2008.
	Kadiivka	Electric	15 Dec 1937	Dec 2007	Gauge: 1,524 mm (5 ft)

== Lviv Oblast ==
Name of system	Location	Traction type	Date (from)	Date (to)	Notes
**Trams in Lviv**	**Lviv**	Horse	5 May 1880	1908(?)	
**Trams in Lviv**	**Lviv**	Electric	31 May 1894	-	Gauge: 1,000 mm (3 ft 3 3/8 in); Construction of tramway tunnel started ca. 1989, stopped 1992.

== Mykolaiv Oblast ==
Name of system	Location	Traction type	Date (from)	Date (to)	Notes
**Trams in Mykolaiv**	**Mykolaiv**	Horse	8 Aug 1897; 1918	1915; 1921	
**Trams in Mykolaiv**	**Mykolaiv**	Electric	3 Jan 1915; May 1922	1918 -	Gauge: 1,524 mm (5 ft); Electric tramway operation suspended because of war.

== Odesa Oblast ==
Name of system	Location	Traction type	Date (from)	Date (to)	Notes
	Bilhorod-Dnistrovskyi	Horse	1904	?	
	Bilhorod-Dnistrovskyi	Steam	1907	1930	
**Trams in Odesa**	**Odesa**	Horse	20 Jul 1880; 1919	1915; Jun 1921	
**Trams in Odesa**	**Odesa**	Electric	24 Sep 1910	-	Gauge: 1,524 mm (5 ft); First electric tramway within Odessa opened 24 Sep 1910. Operation suspended Jan 1919 – Jun 1921 because of war.
	♦ Khadzhybeiskyi Lyman	Horse	23 May 1899	1917	
	♦ Kuialnytskyi Lyman	Horse	4 Jun 1888	1915	
	♦ Odessa - Velykoho Fontanu	Steam	23 Jul 1881; 1920	Oct 1912 (electrified); 5 Sep 1922	
	♦ Odessa - Khadzhybeiskyi Lyman	Steam	1893; 1920	Oct 1913 (electrified); 5 Sep 1922	
	♦ **Lustdorf (Chornomorka)**	Electric	22 Aug 1907		

== Poltava Oblast ==
Name of System	Location	Traction Type	Date (From)	Date (To)	Notes
Trams in Poltava	Poltava	(Electric)	1923	2002	Construction started 1962, not completed.
	Kremenchuk	(Electric)	11 December 1899	1921	Gauge: 1,000 mm (3 ft 3 3/8 in)

== Sevastopol ==
Name of System	Location	Traction Type	Date (From)	Date (To)	Notes
Trams in Sevastopol	Sevastopol	Electric	24 Sep 1898	1942	Gauge: 1,000 mm (3 ft 3 3/8 in); Operation suspended because of war, not restored.
	♦ Sevastopol - Balaklava	Electric	1925	1942	Operation suspended because of war, not restored.

== Sumy Oblast ==
Name of system	Location	Traction type	Date (from)	Date (to)	Notes
**Trams in Konotop**	**Konotop**	Electric	25 Dec 1949	-	Gauge: 1,524 mm (5 ft)
	Sumy	Horse	1958	1999	Gauge: 1,524 mm (5 ft); Zinoviev "Parovoz". includes Sumy in a list of Ukrainian towns which have or had tramways, but provides no details.

== Vinnytsia Oblast ==
Name of system	Location	Traction type	Date (from)	Date (to)	Notes
**Trams in Vinnytsia**	**Vinnytsia**	Electric	28 Oct 1913	-	Gauge: 1,000 mm (3 ft 3 3/8 in); Operation suspended Feb 1920 – 27 Nov 1921, and Mar 1944 – Jun 1945, because of war.

== Zaporizhzhia Oblast ==
Name of system	Location	Traction type	Date (from)	Date (to)	Notes
**Zaporizhzhia Tram**	**Zaporizhzhia**	Electric	17 Jul 1932	-	Gauge: 1,524 mm (5 ft); Operation suspended 1943 – 12 Oct 1944 because of war.

== Zhytomyr Oblast ==
Name of system	Location	Traction type	Date (from)	Date (to)	Notes
	Berdychiv	Horse	4 Aug 1892	1921	Gauge: 1,524 mm (5 ft)
**Trams in Zhytomyr**	**Zhytomyr**	Electric	3 Sep 1899	-	Gauge: 1,000 mm (3 ft 3 3/8 in); Operation suspended 1918 – 10 Aug 1920 because of war.

== See also ==
- List of trolleybus systems in Ukraine
- List of town tramway systems in Europe
- List of tram and light rail transit systems
- List of metro systems
