= Trams in Yenakiieve =

Yenakiieve tram system
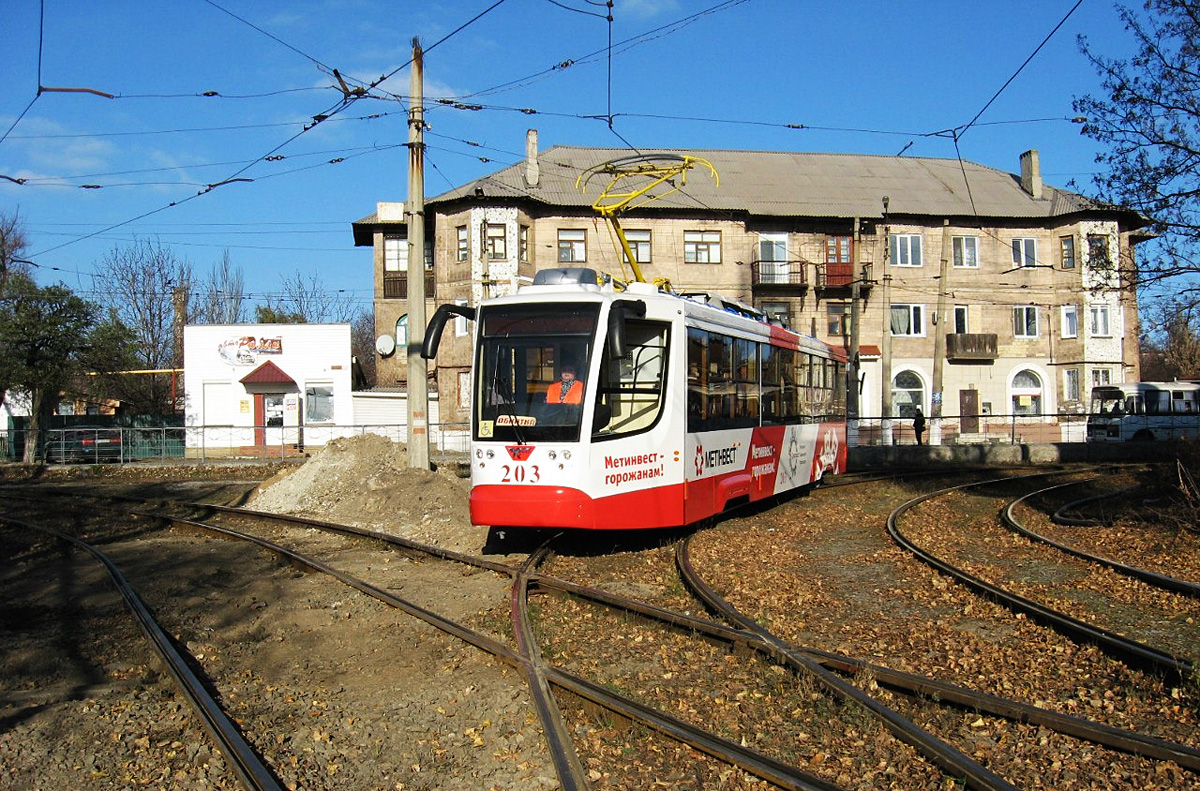
- One of the new trams

Operation
- Locale: Yenakiieve, Ukraine
- Open: 24 May 1932
- Routes: 3

Infrastructure
- Track gauge: 1,524 mm (5 ft)
- Propulsion system: 550V
- Depot: 1
- Stock: KTM-5M3, 71-623

Statistics
- Route length: 39.7

The Yenakiieve tram system, located in Yenakiieve, Ukraine, opened on May 24, 1932. As of 2010 it has three routes, 32.7 km and 37 rail cars.

== Routes ==
- Red Town - Cheryomushki (101 quarter)
- Mine "Red October" - Cheryomushki (101 quarter)
- Center (Voyenkomat) - District behalf Braylyana

== See also ==
- List of town tramway systems in Ukraine
