= Trams in Donetsk =

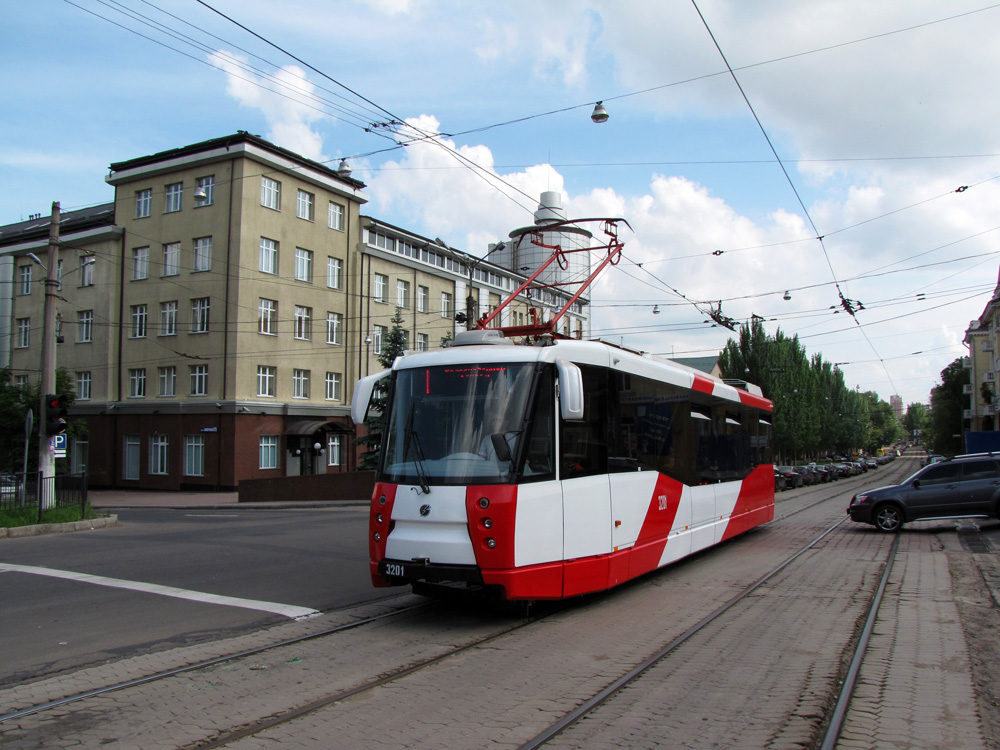

Operation
- Locale: Donetsk, Ukraine
- Lines: 10

Infrastructure
- Track gauge: 1524 mm
- Depot: 2

Statistics
- Route length: 126.25 kilometres (78.45 mi)
- Website: doneelektroavtotrans.ru (Note: Donetsk has been de facto controlled by Russia since 2014, but is internationally recognized as Ukrainian territory)

Trams in Donetsk (Ukrainian: Донецький трамвай, romanized: Donetskyi tramvai; Russian: Донецкий трамвай) refer to trams in the Ukrainian city of Donetsk, and is one of the main mass transit systems in the city. The system totals 126.25 kilometres (78.45 mi) across 10 lines.

== History ==
On March 2, 1927, the city's executive committee approved the construction of a tram line. The first line, with a length of 8 kilometres (5.0 mi), opened on June 15, 1928.

In 1940, the city began to expand the tram network, with plans to merge with the tram network Makiivka. However, the German invasion of Soviet Union in June 1941 cut off this plan, and it never materialized.

During the German-Soviet War, the trams in the city were used mainly for economic purposes, including transport of different goods. However, the system suffered much destruction as a result of wartime bombing. The system was rebuilt soon after the war ended.

In the 1950s, the authorities made a series of changes to the tram system, including building an extension line to a newly built cotton factory.

== Gallery ==
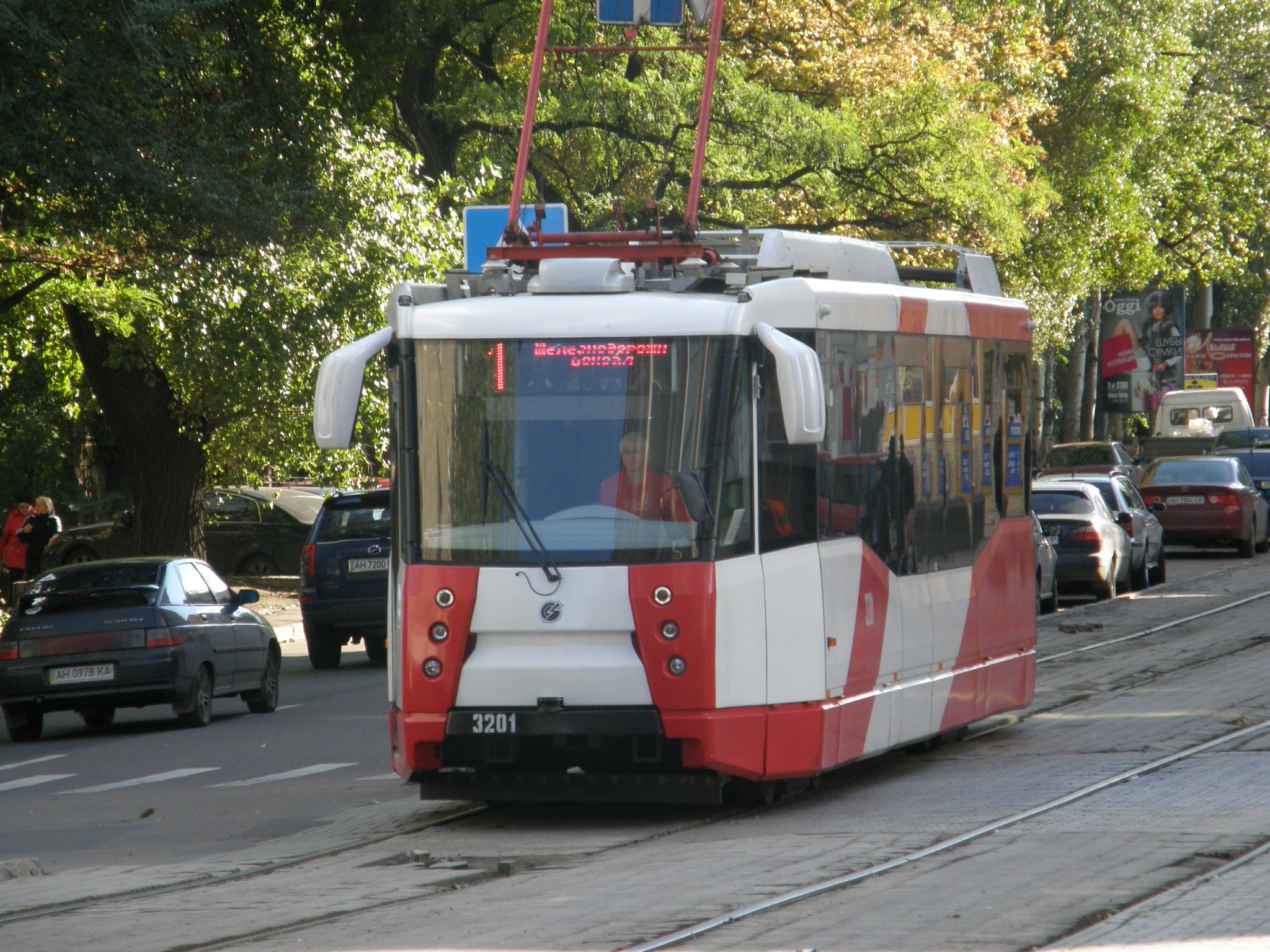

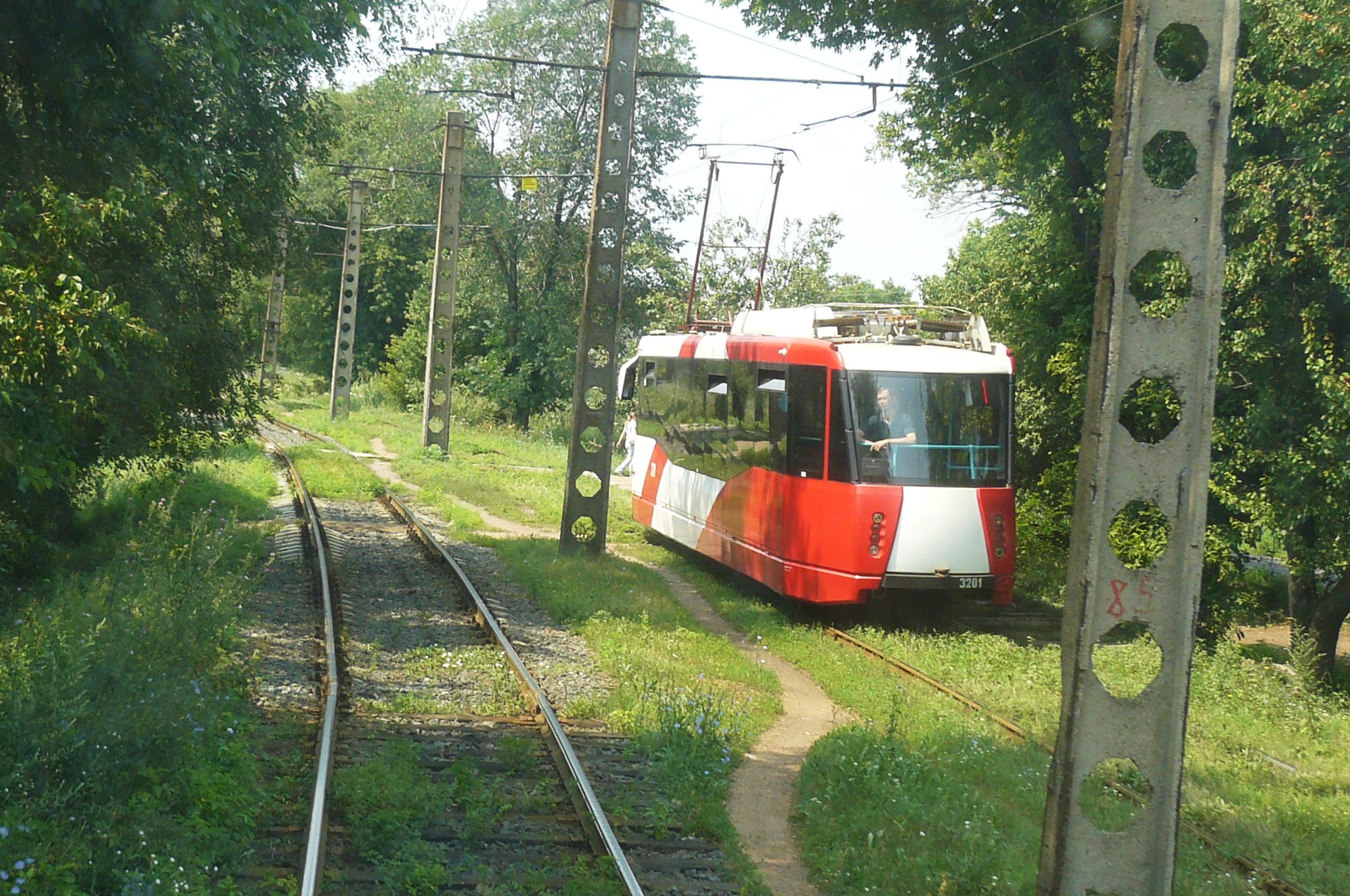

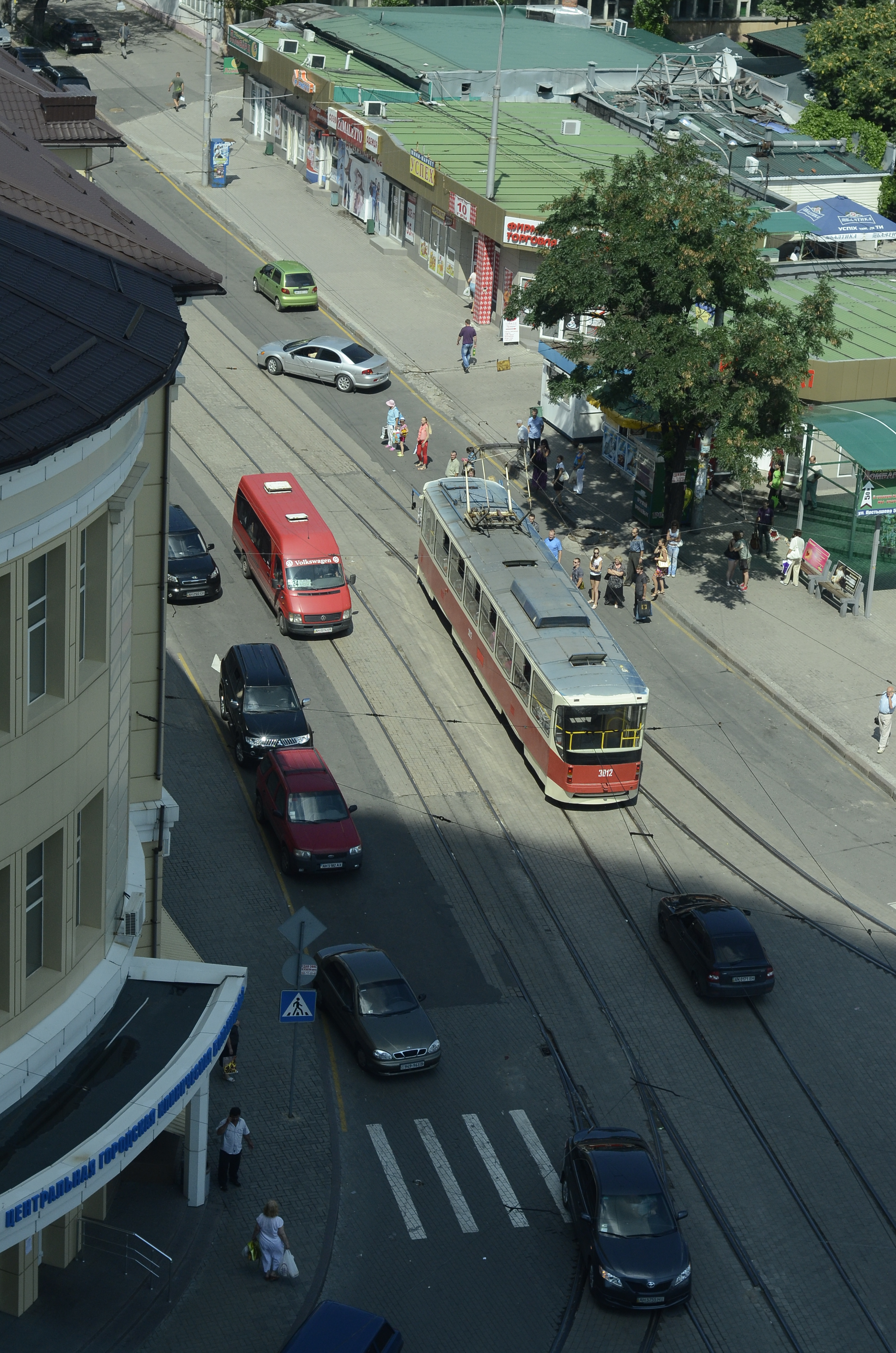

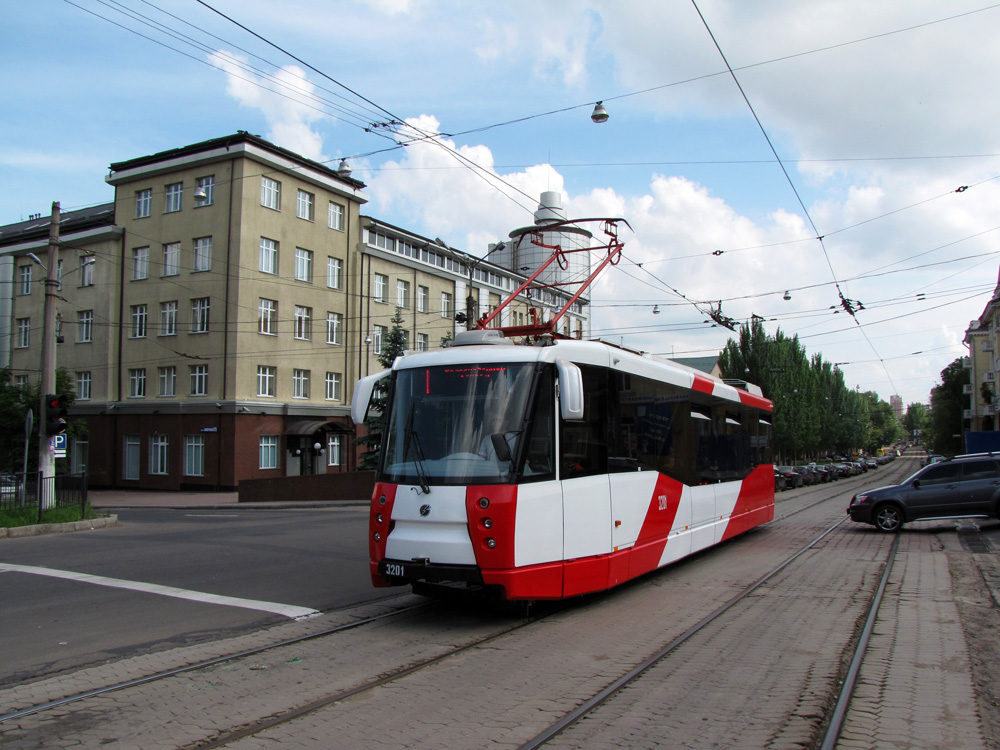

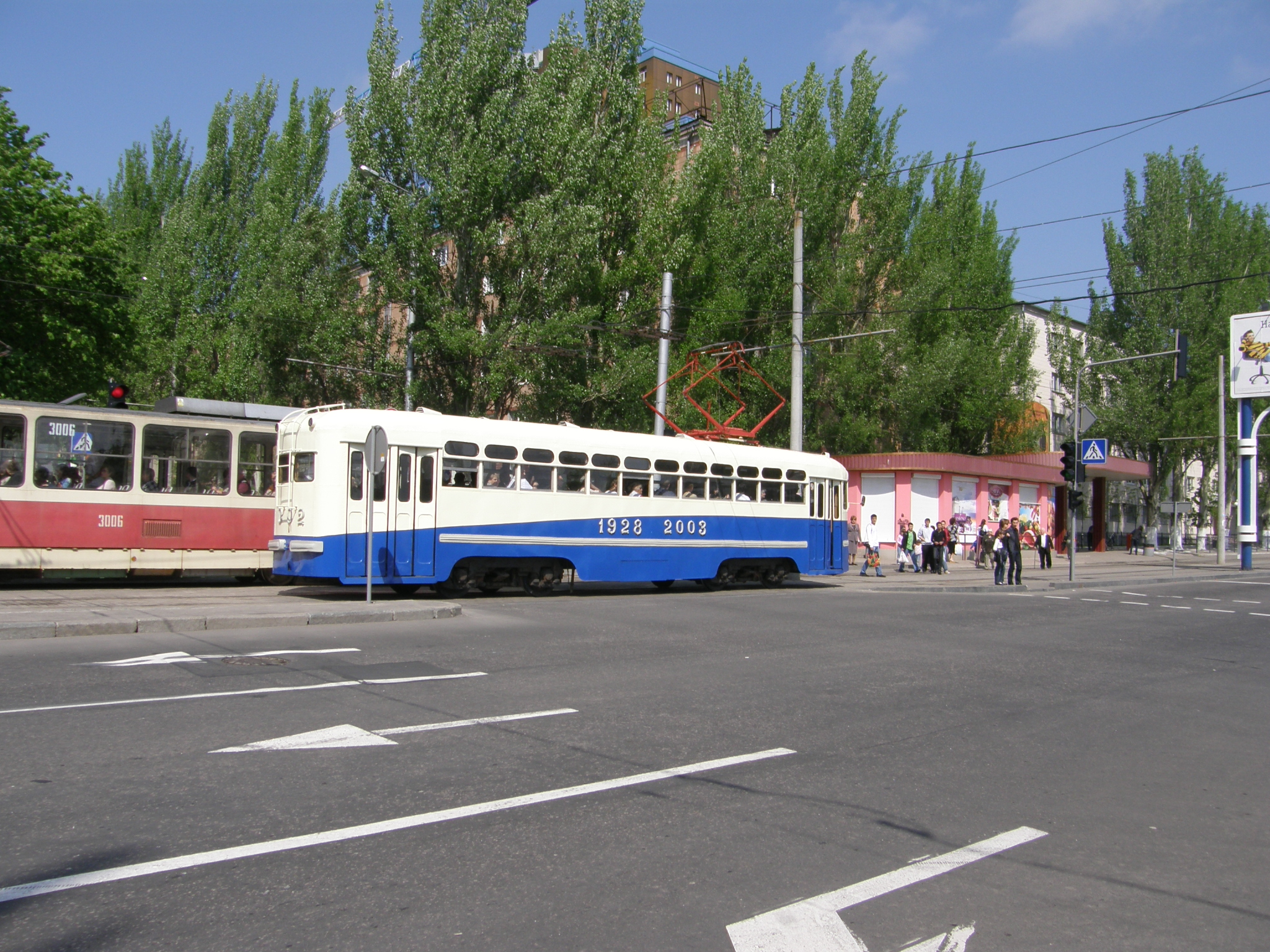

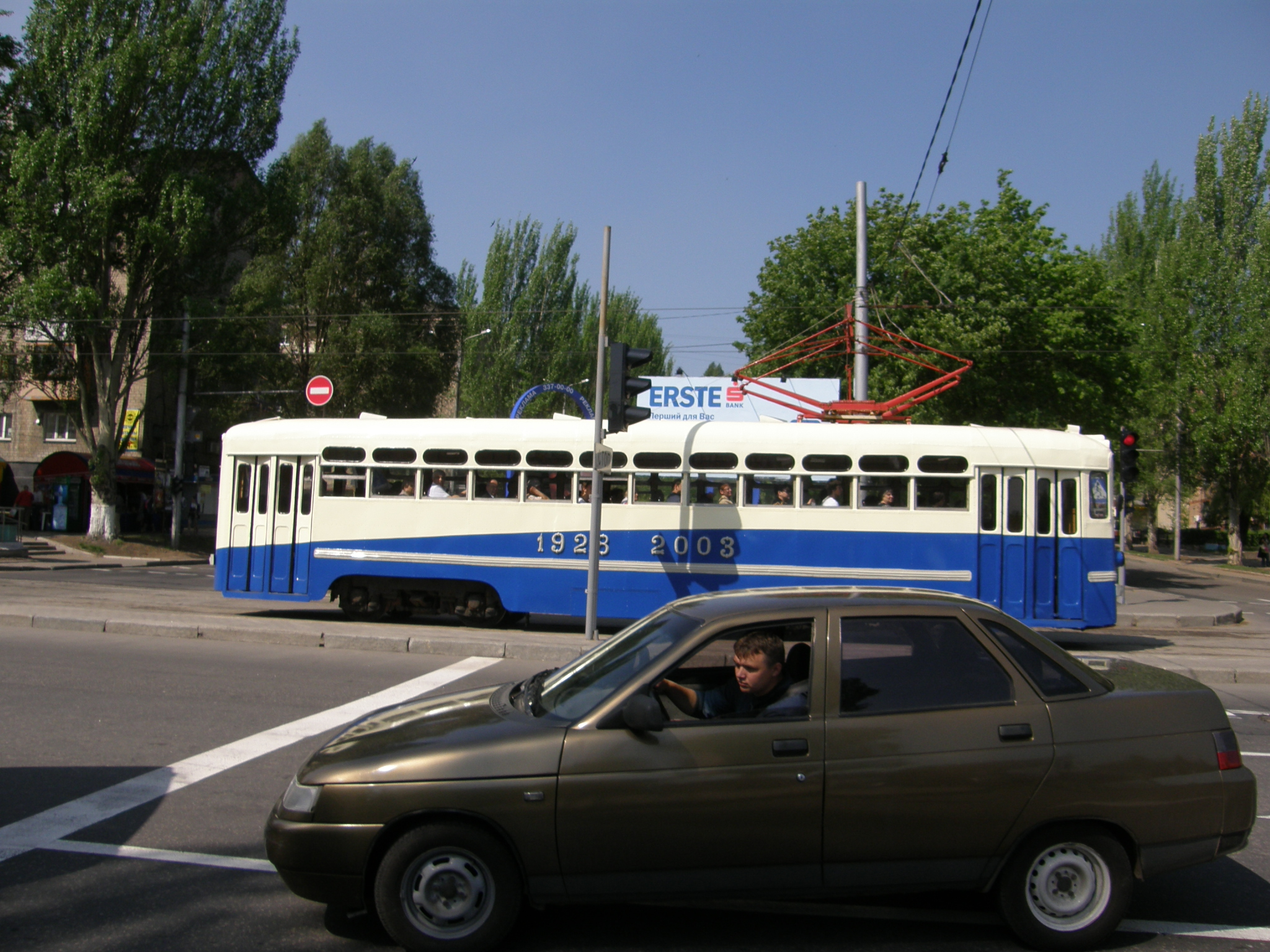

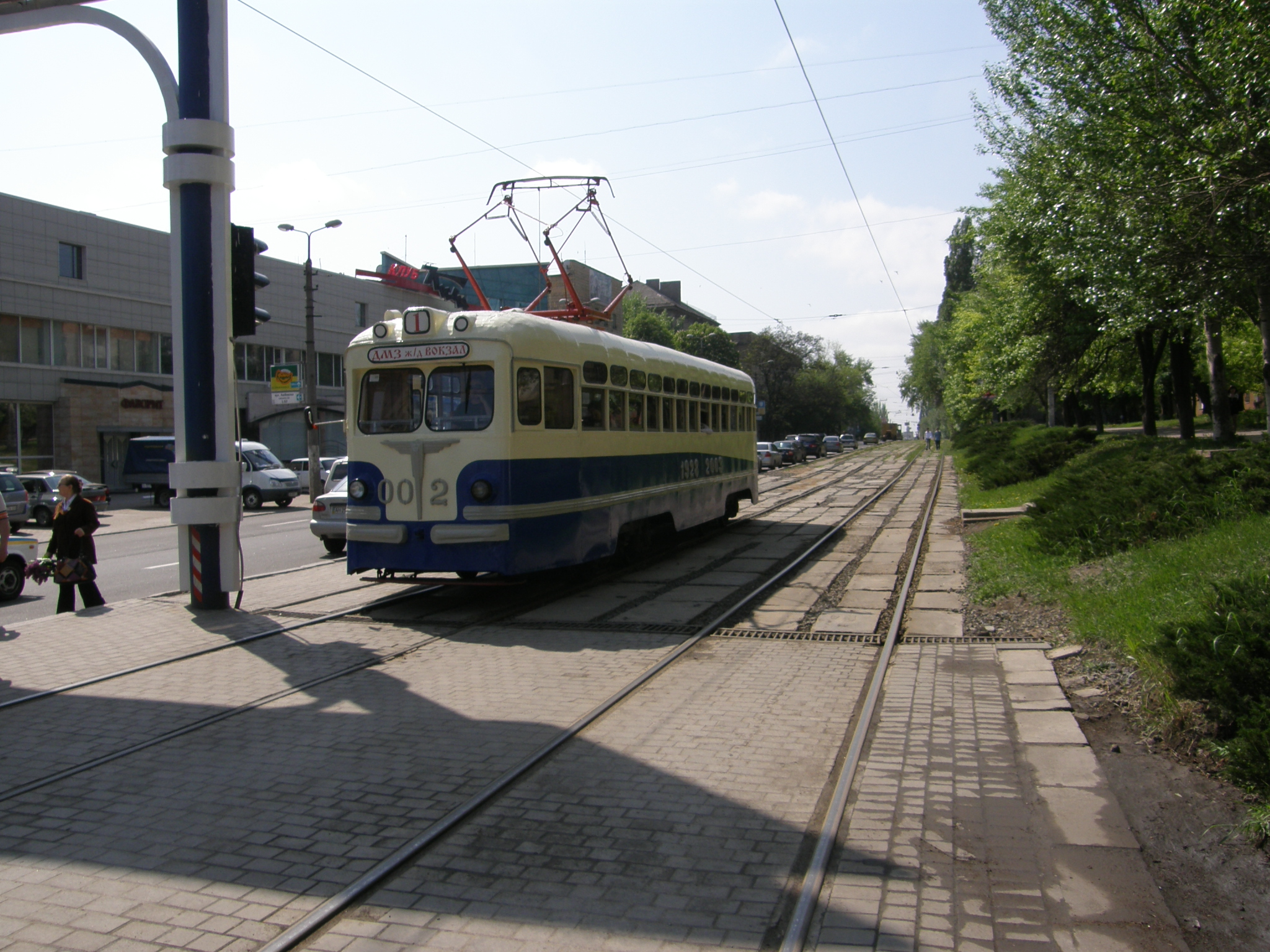

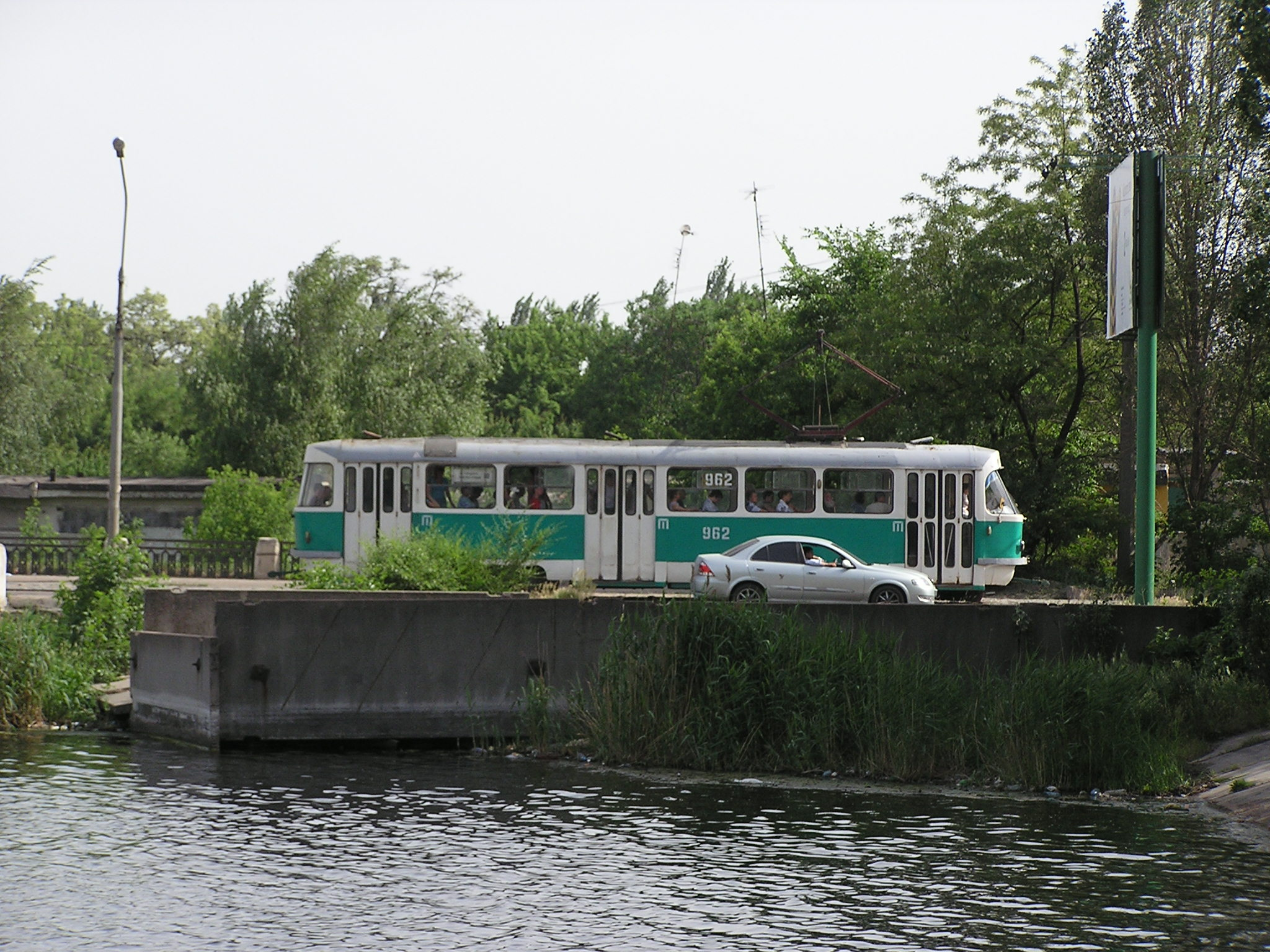

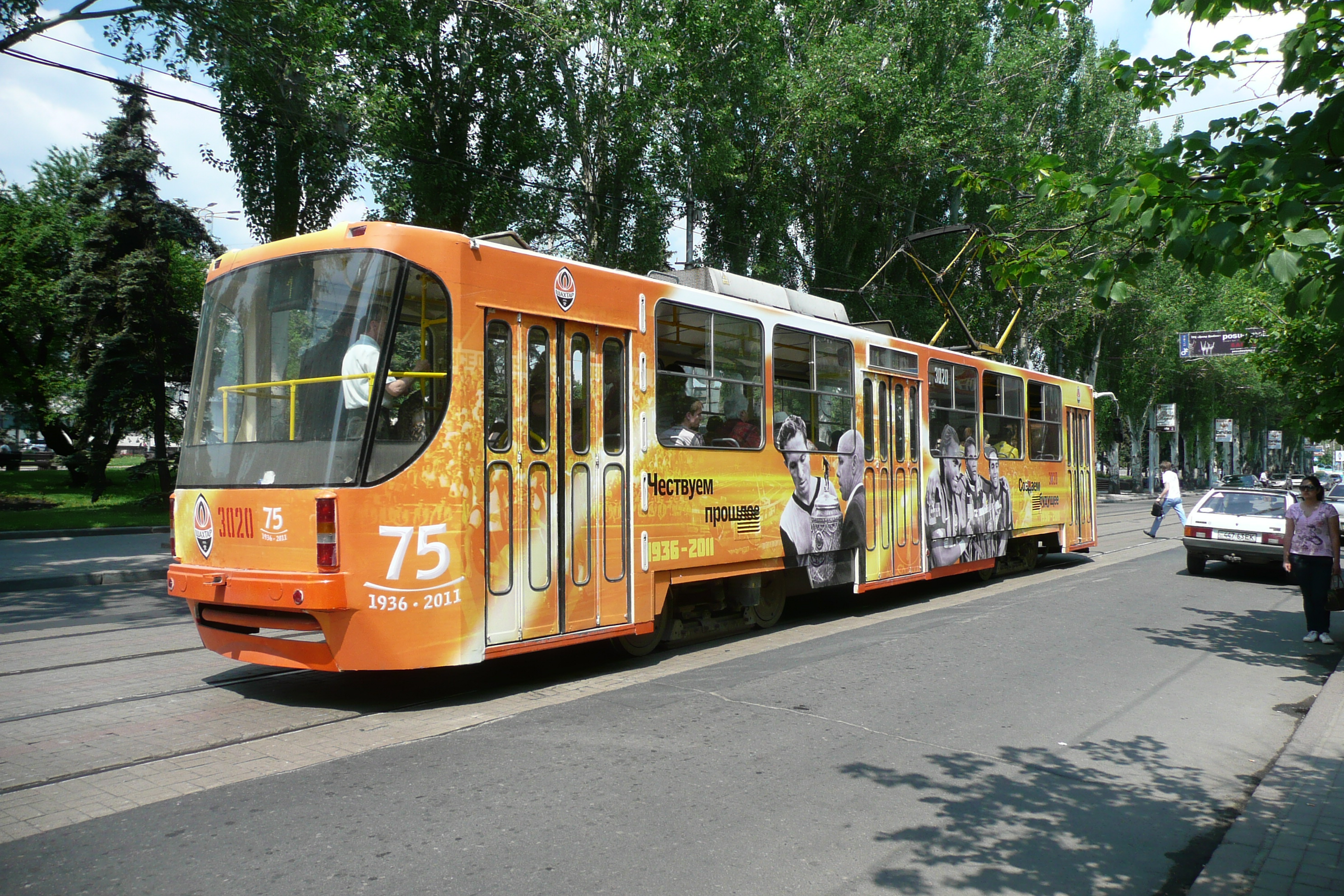

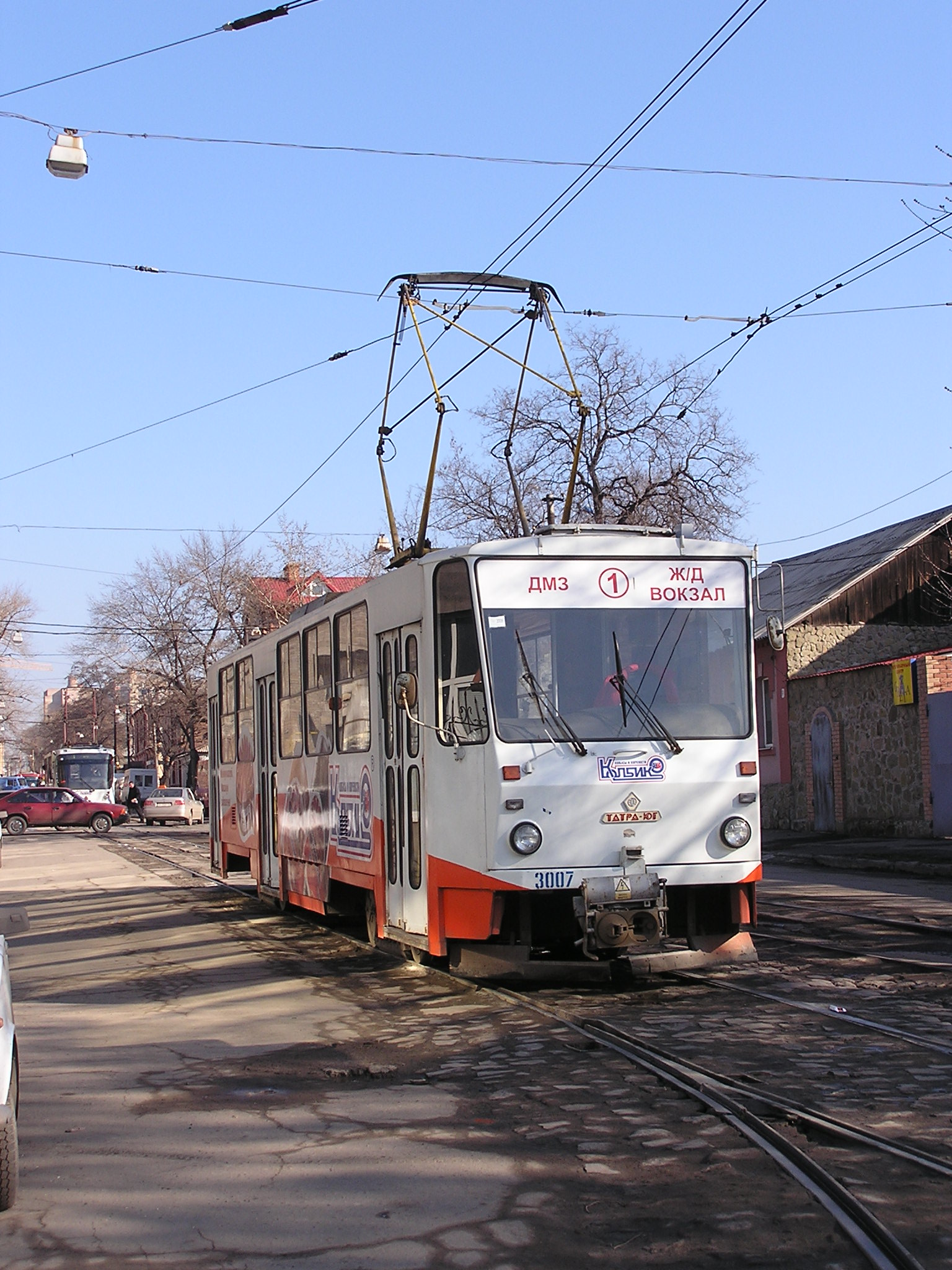

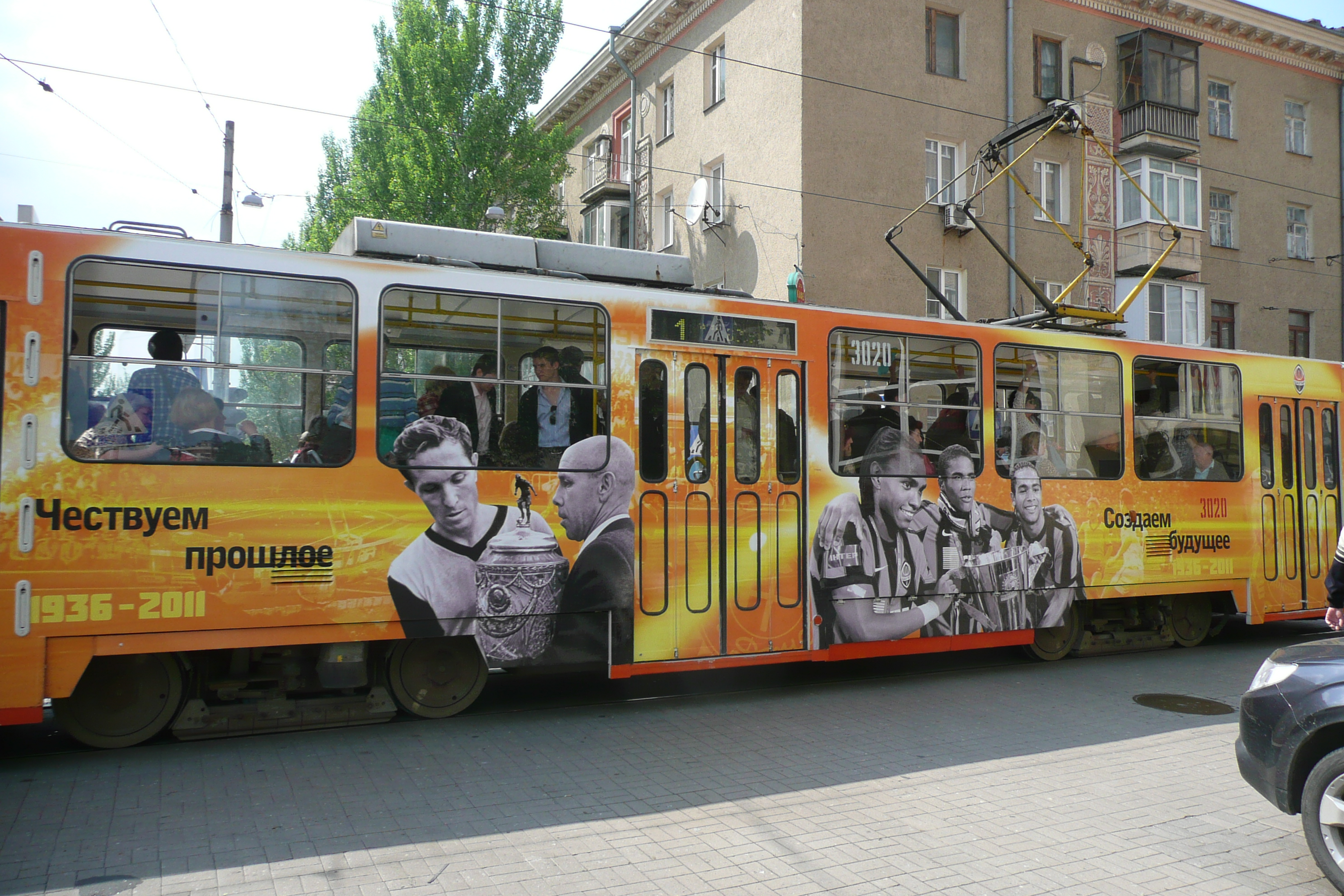

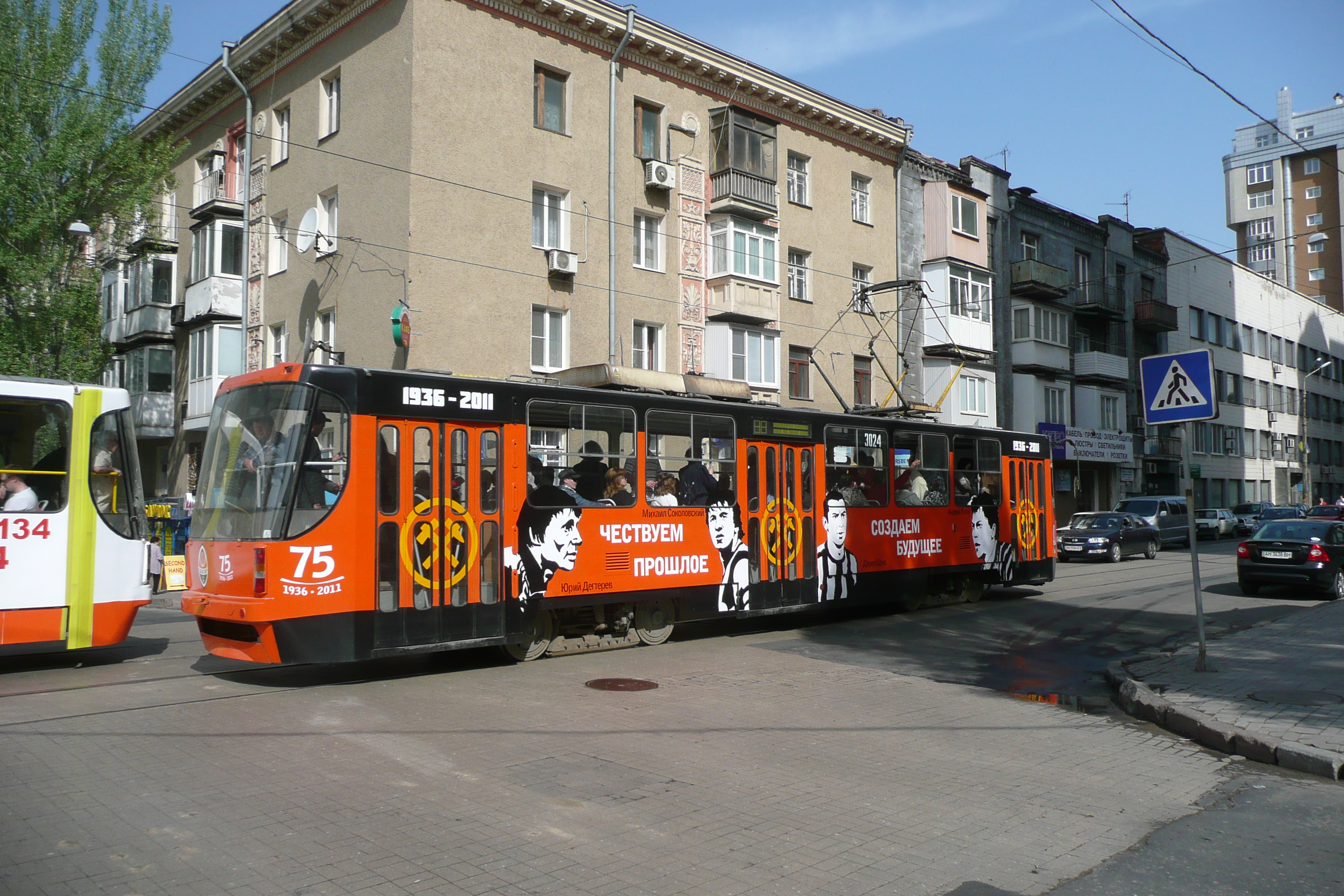

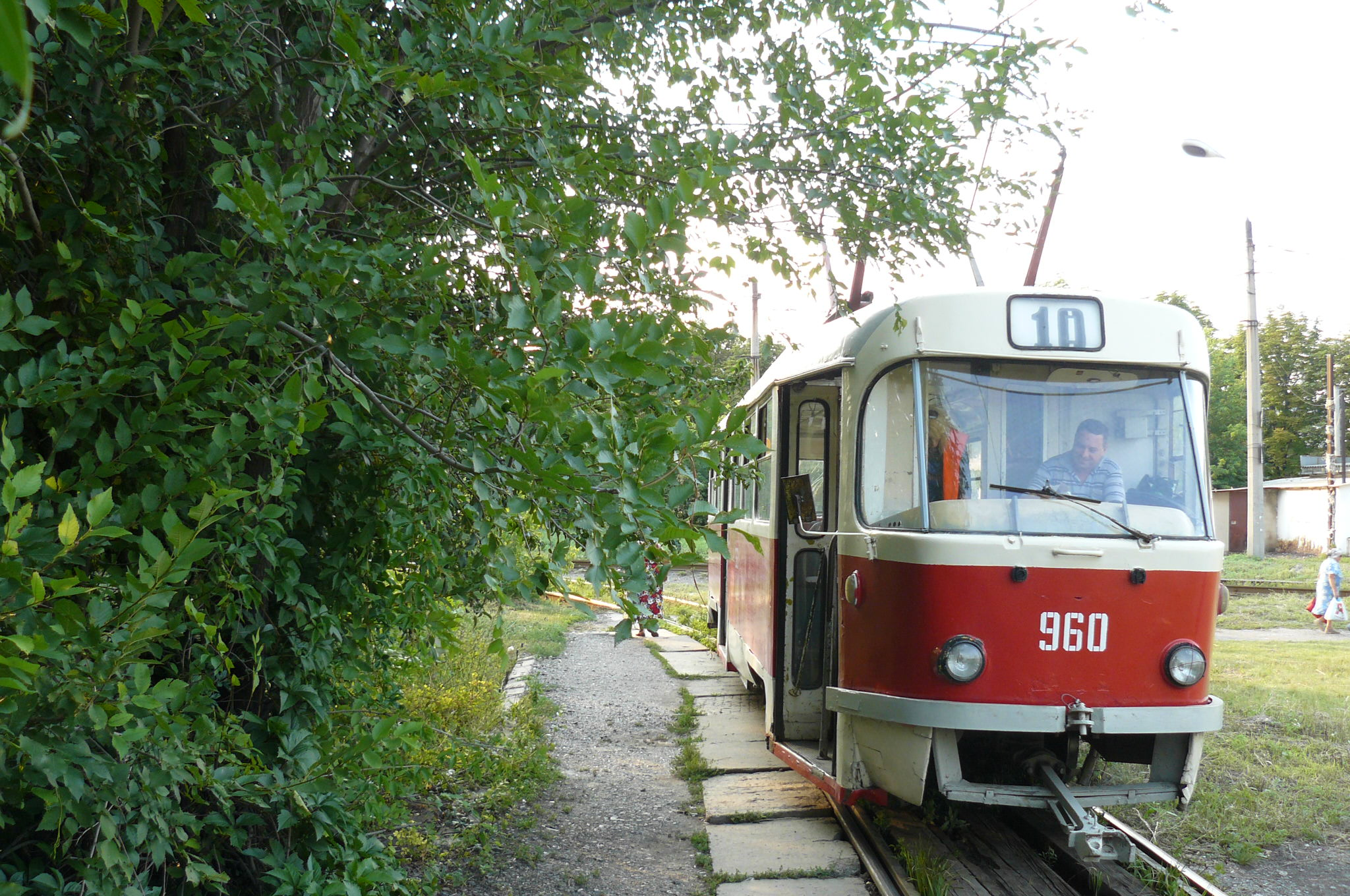

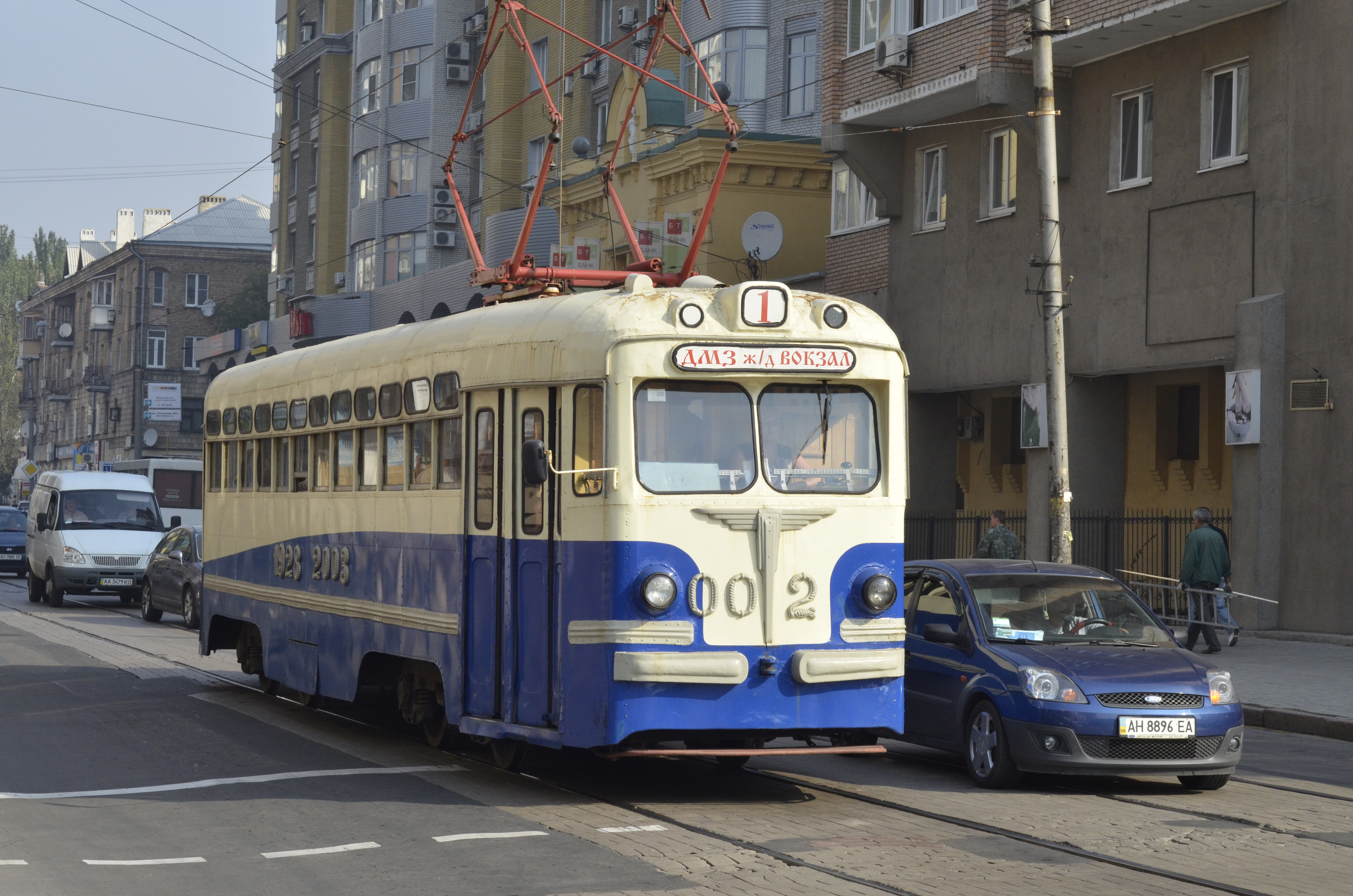

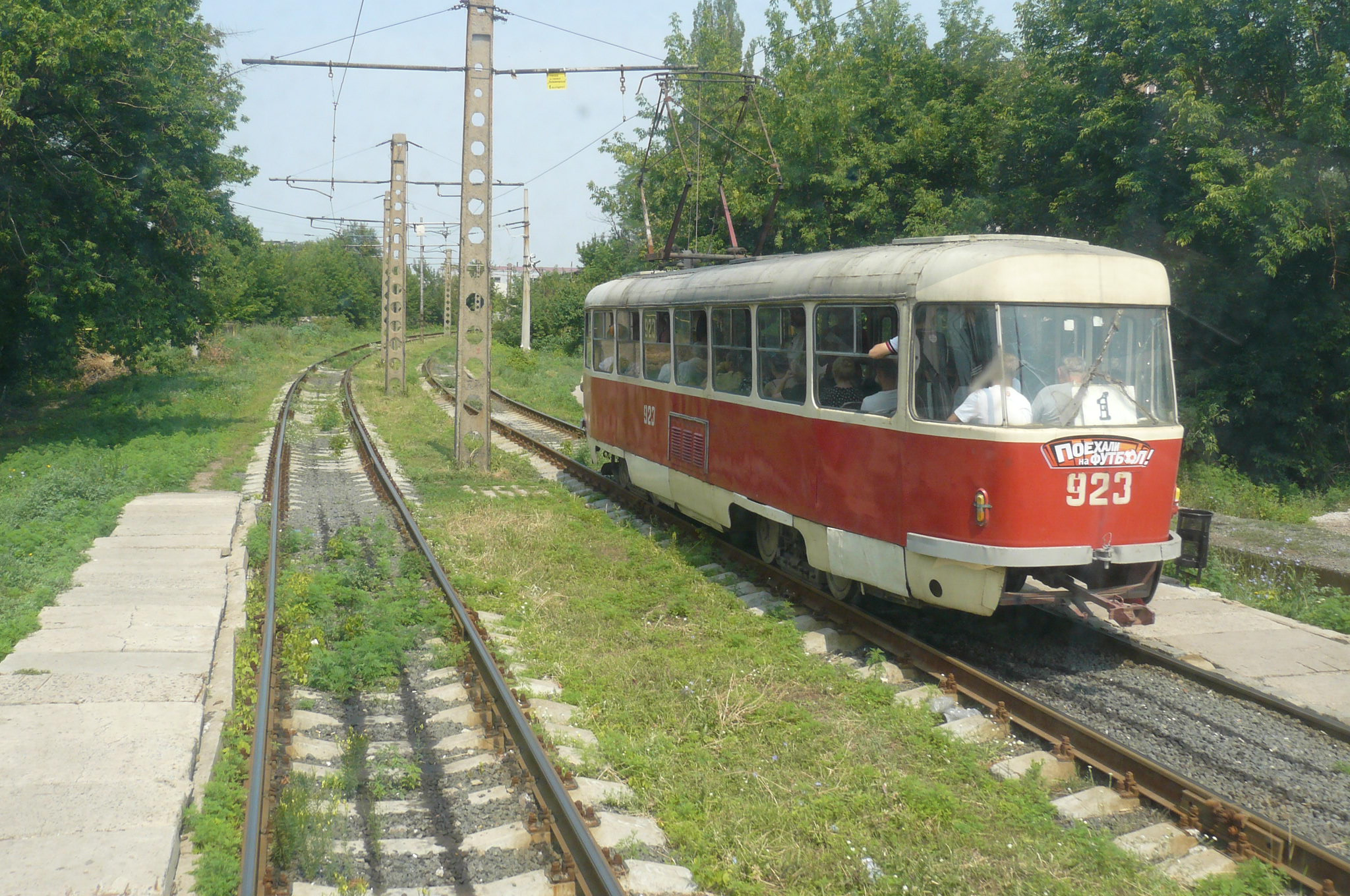

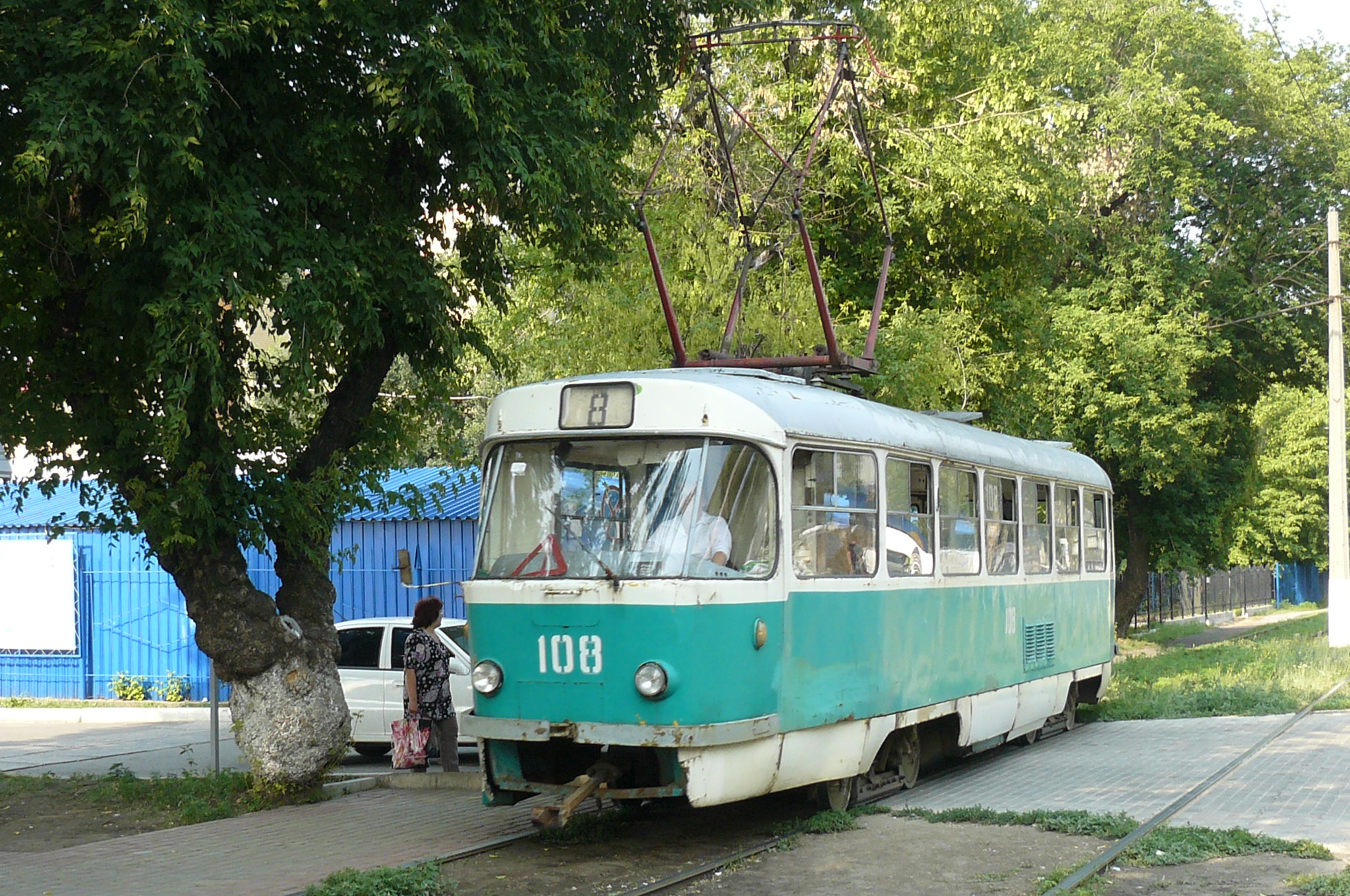

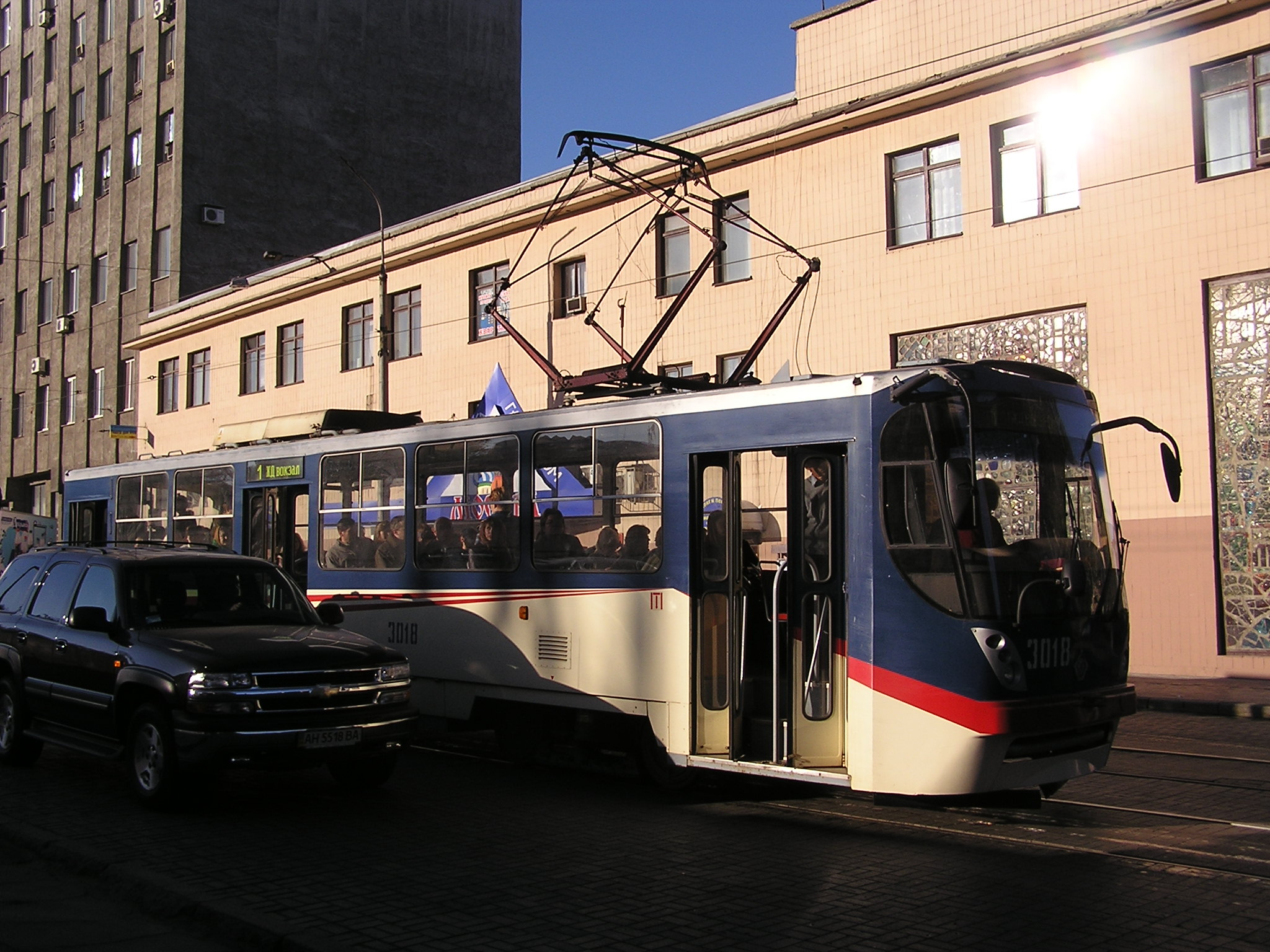

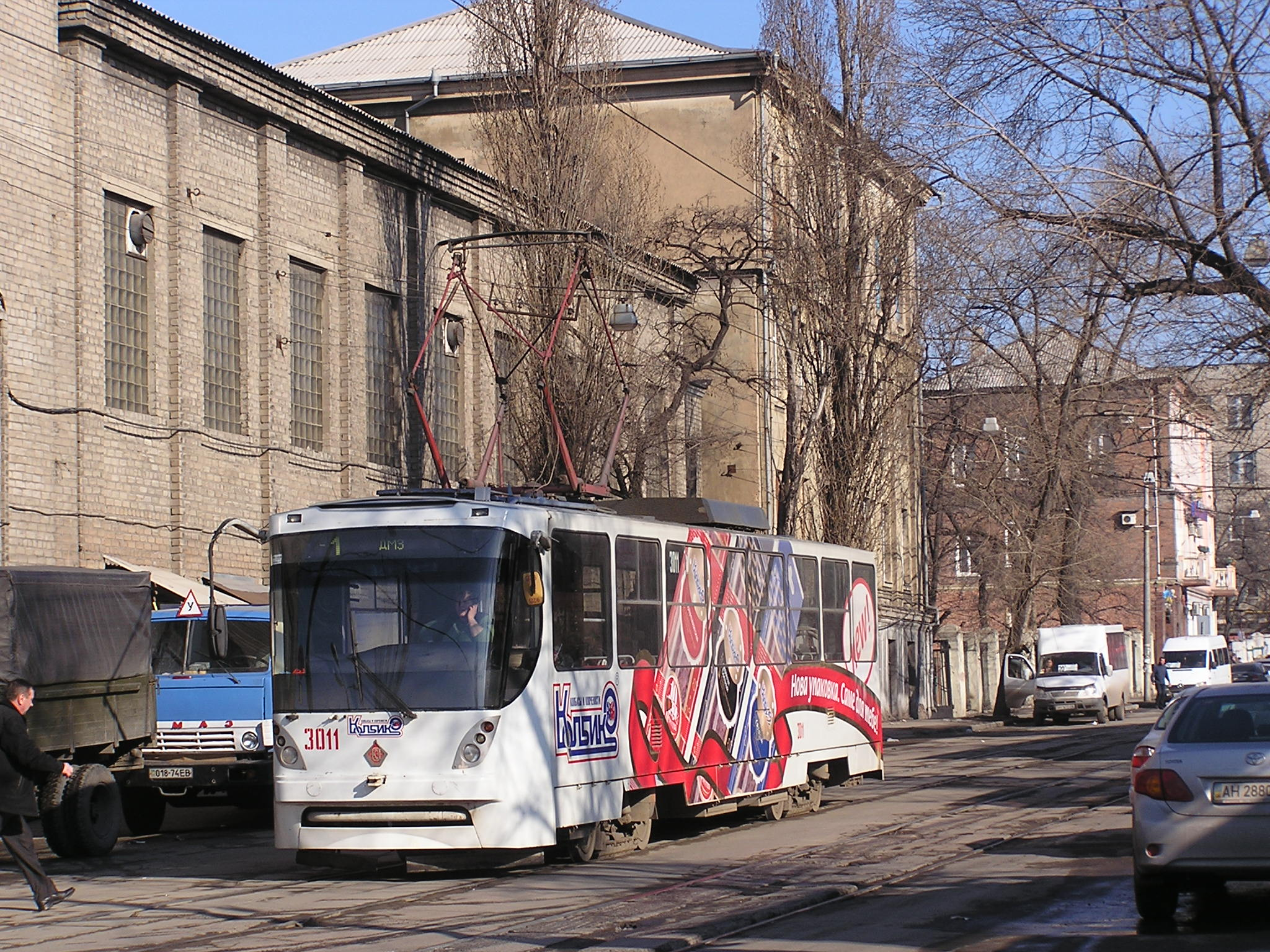

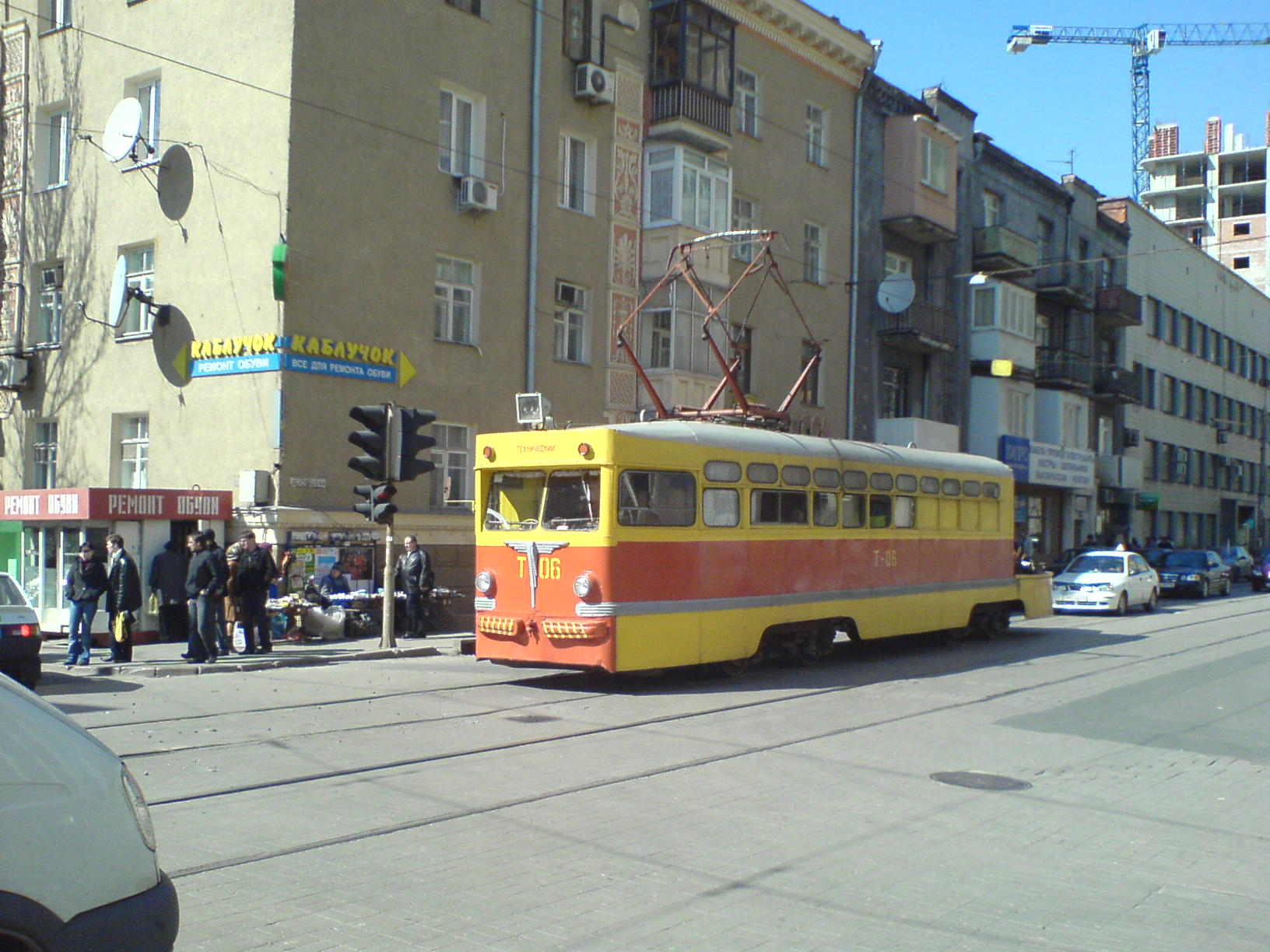

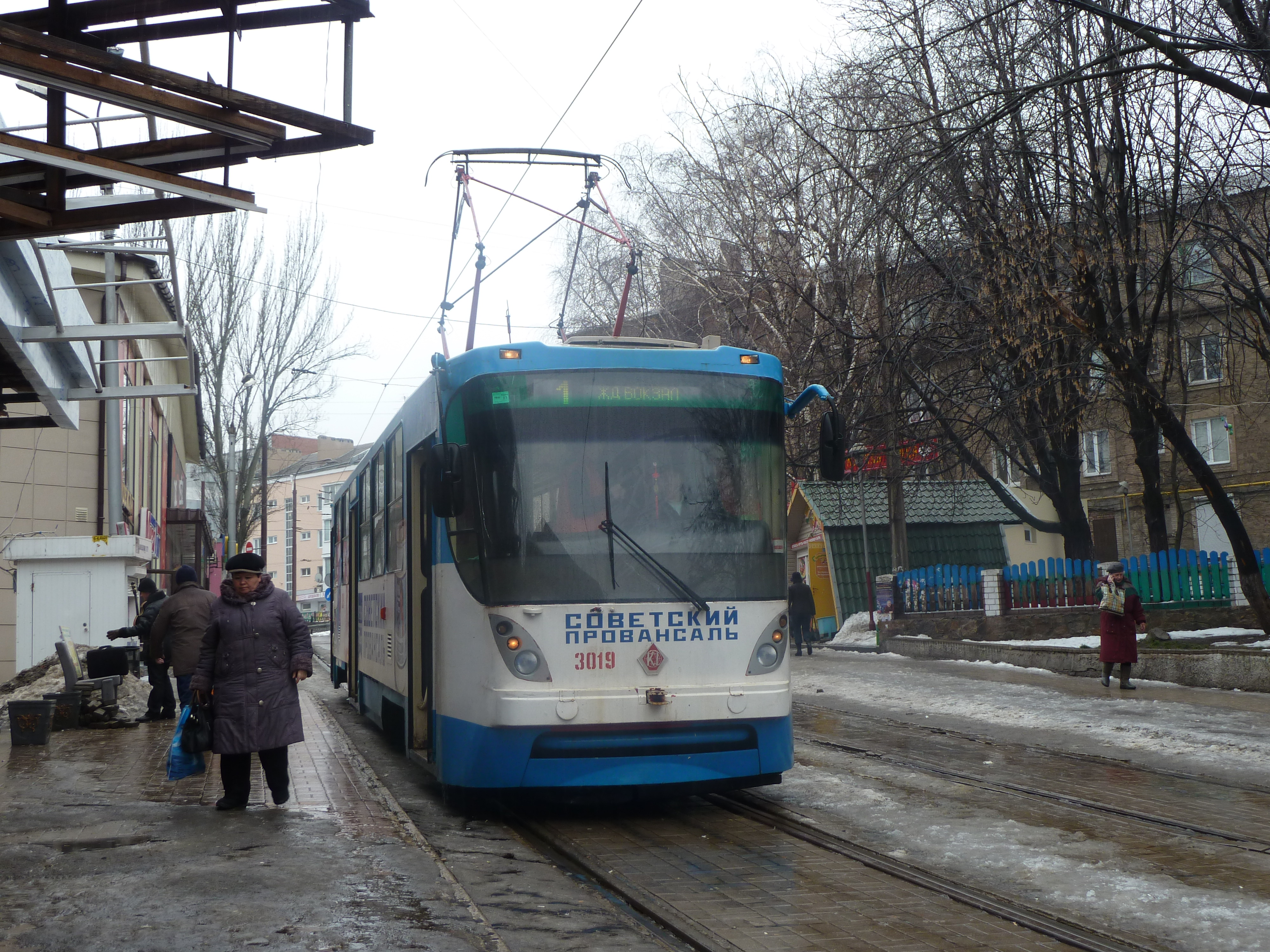

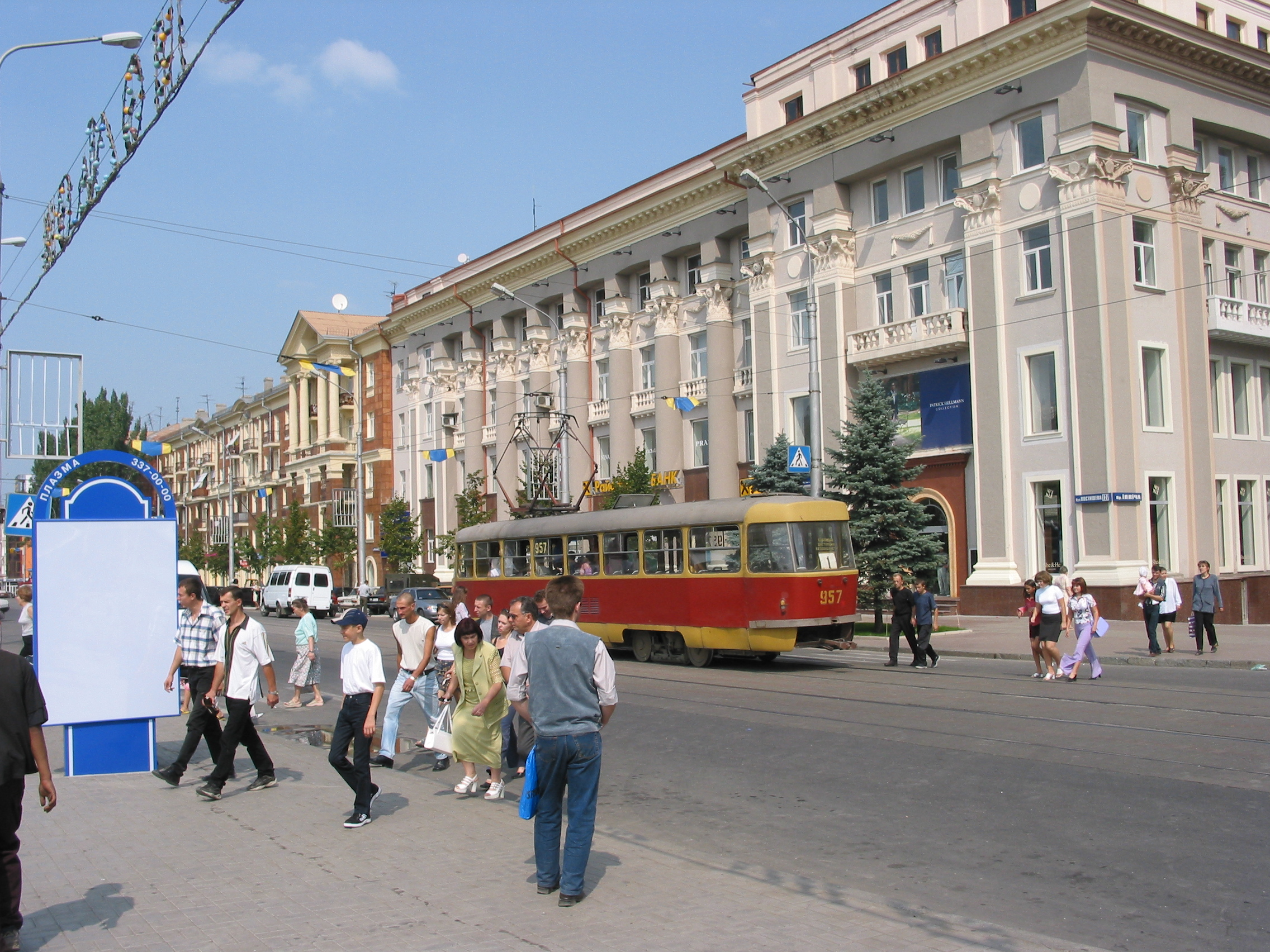

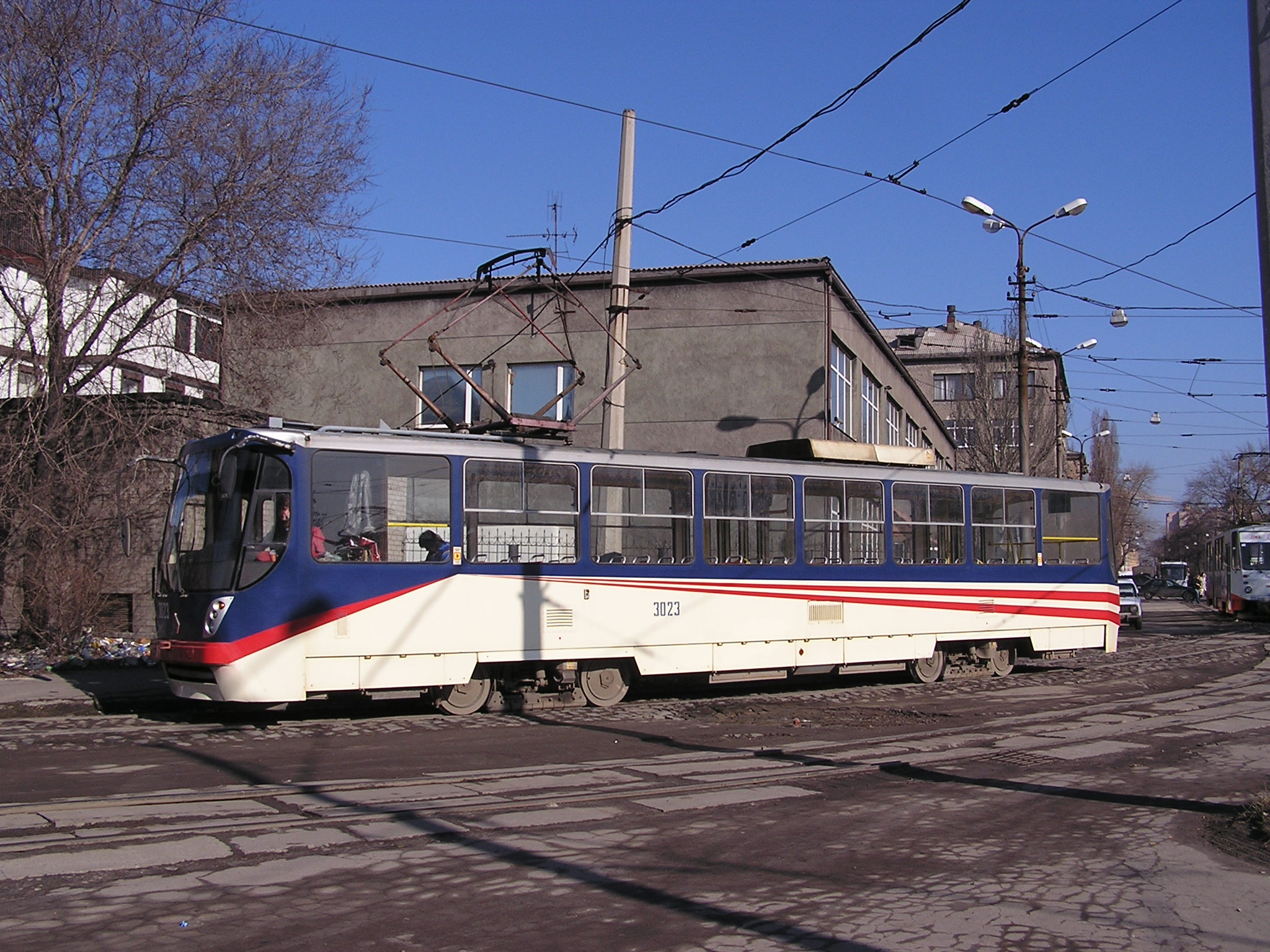

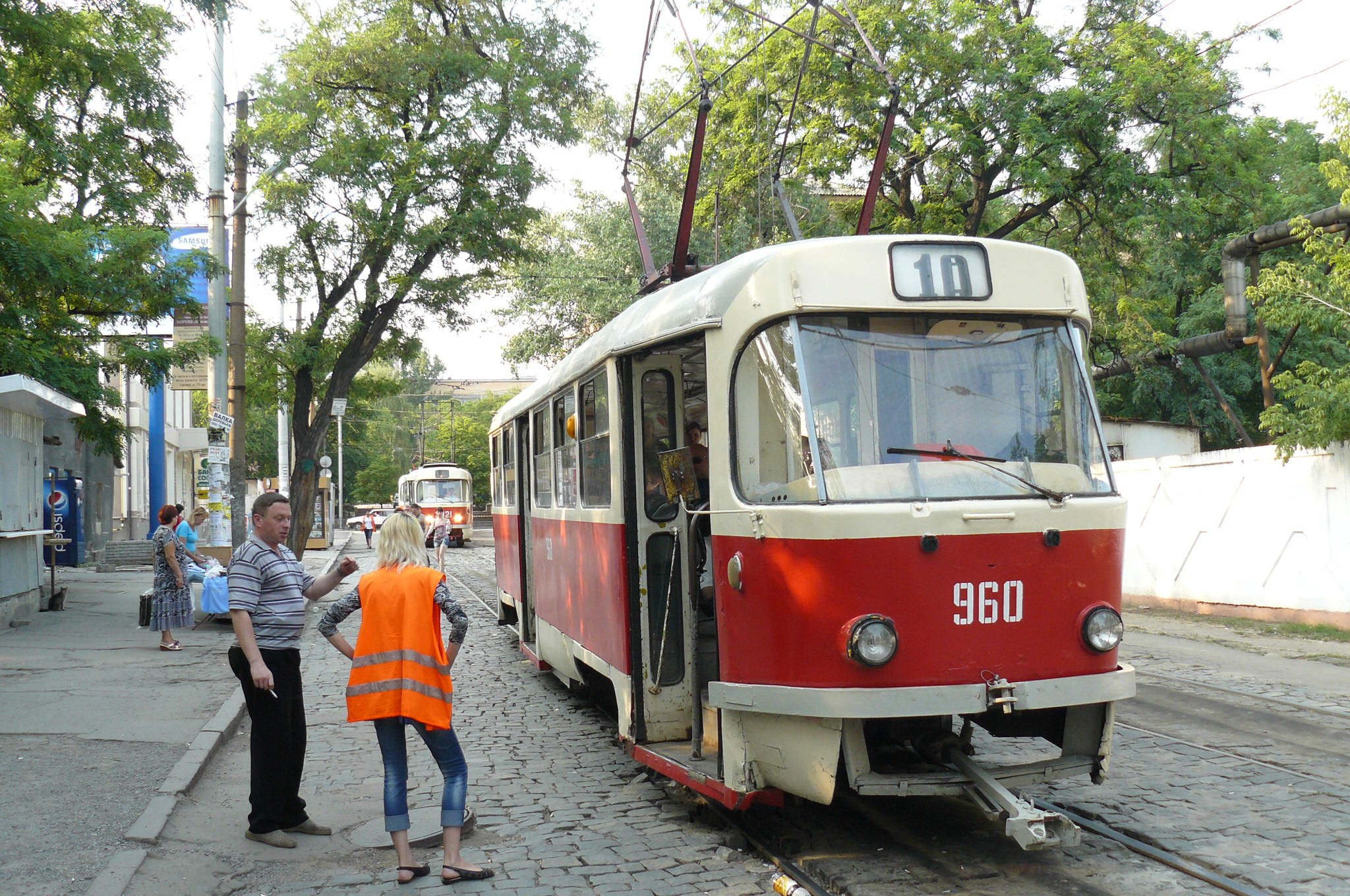

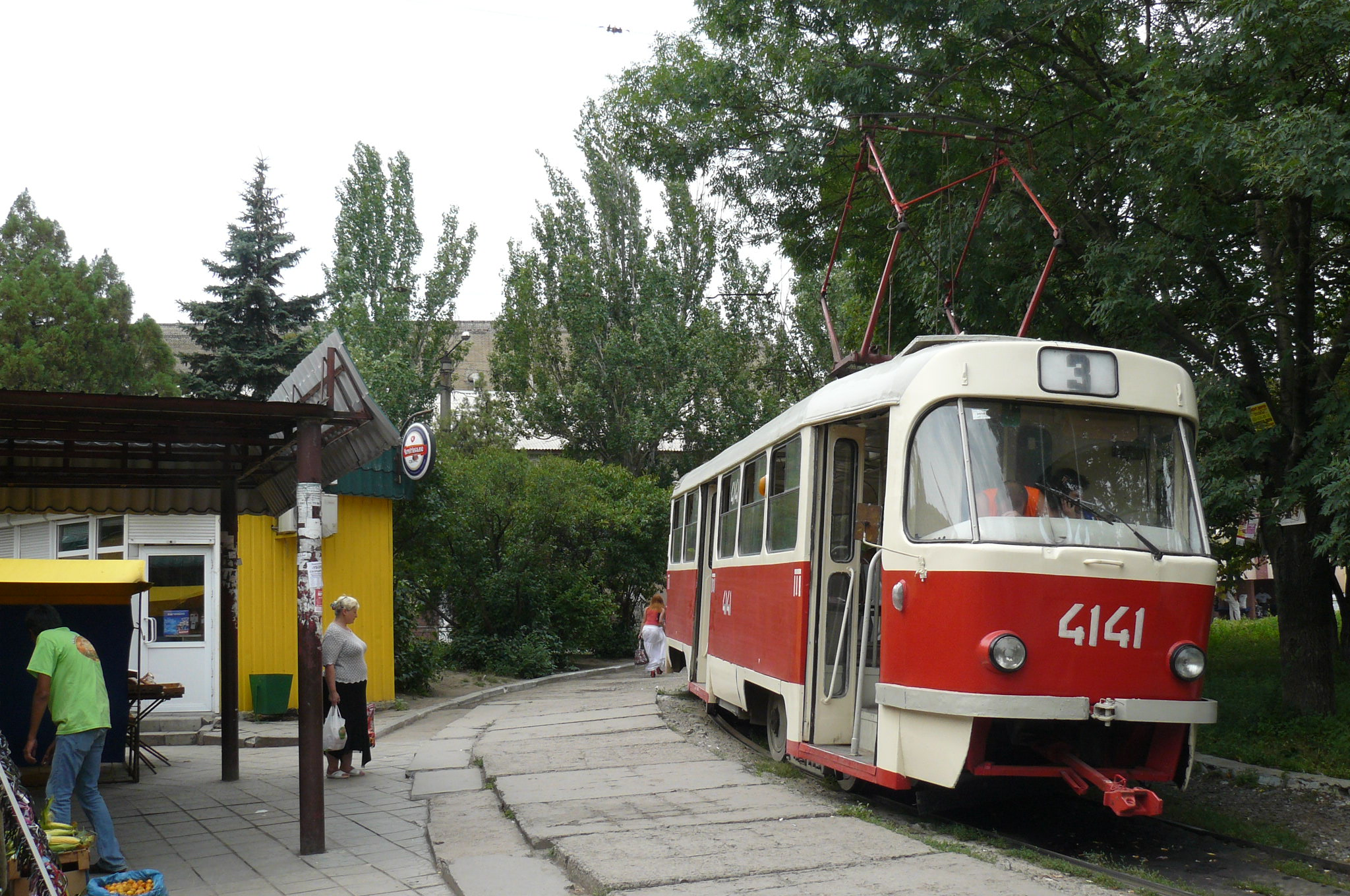

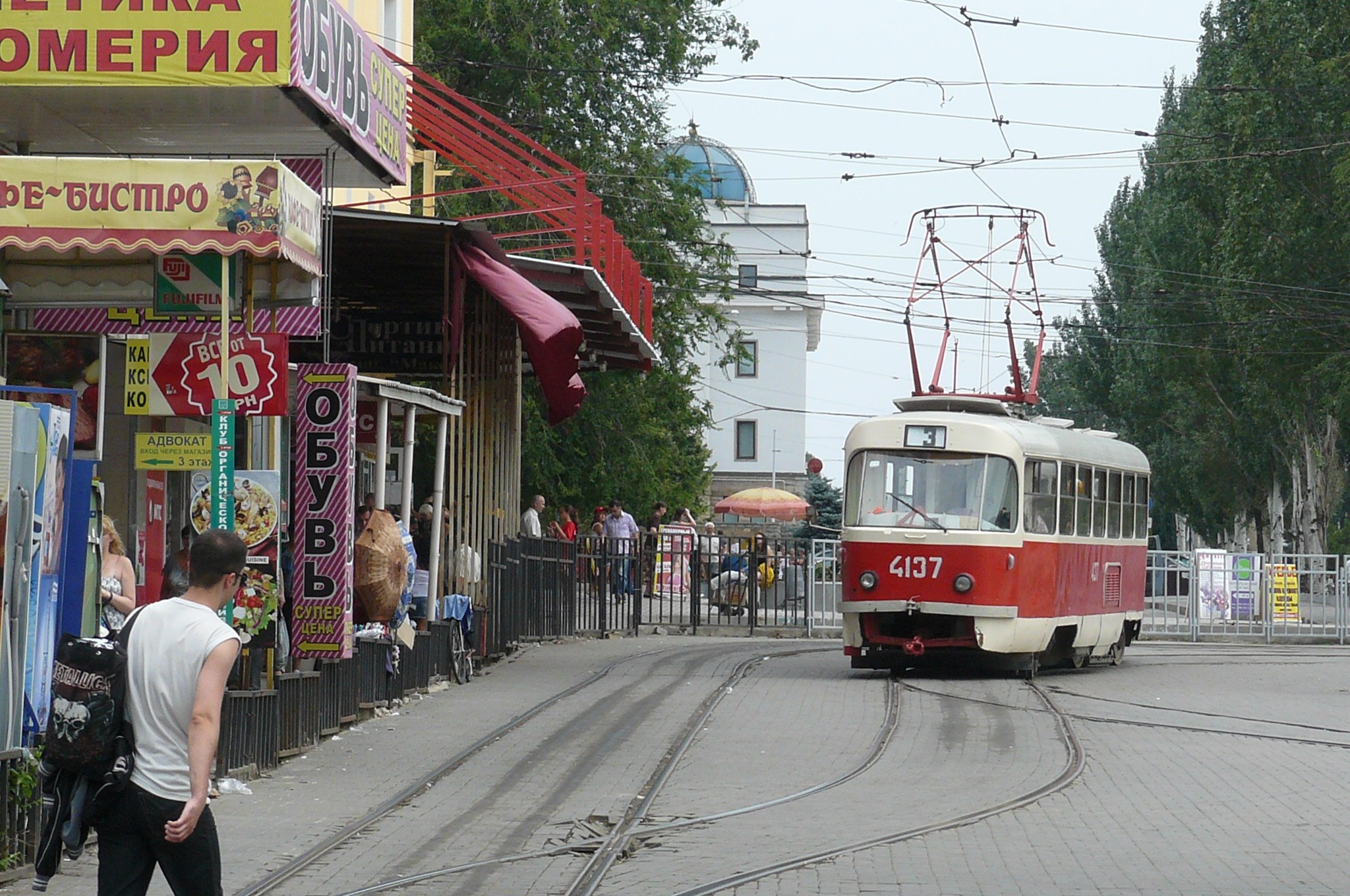

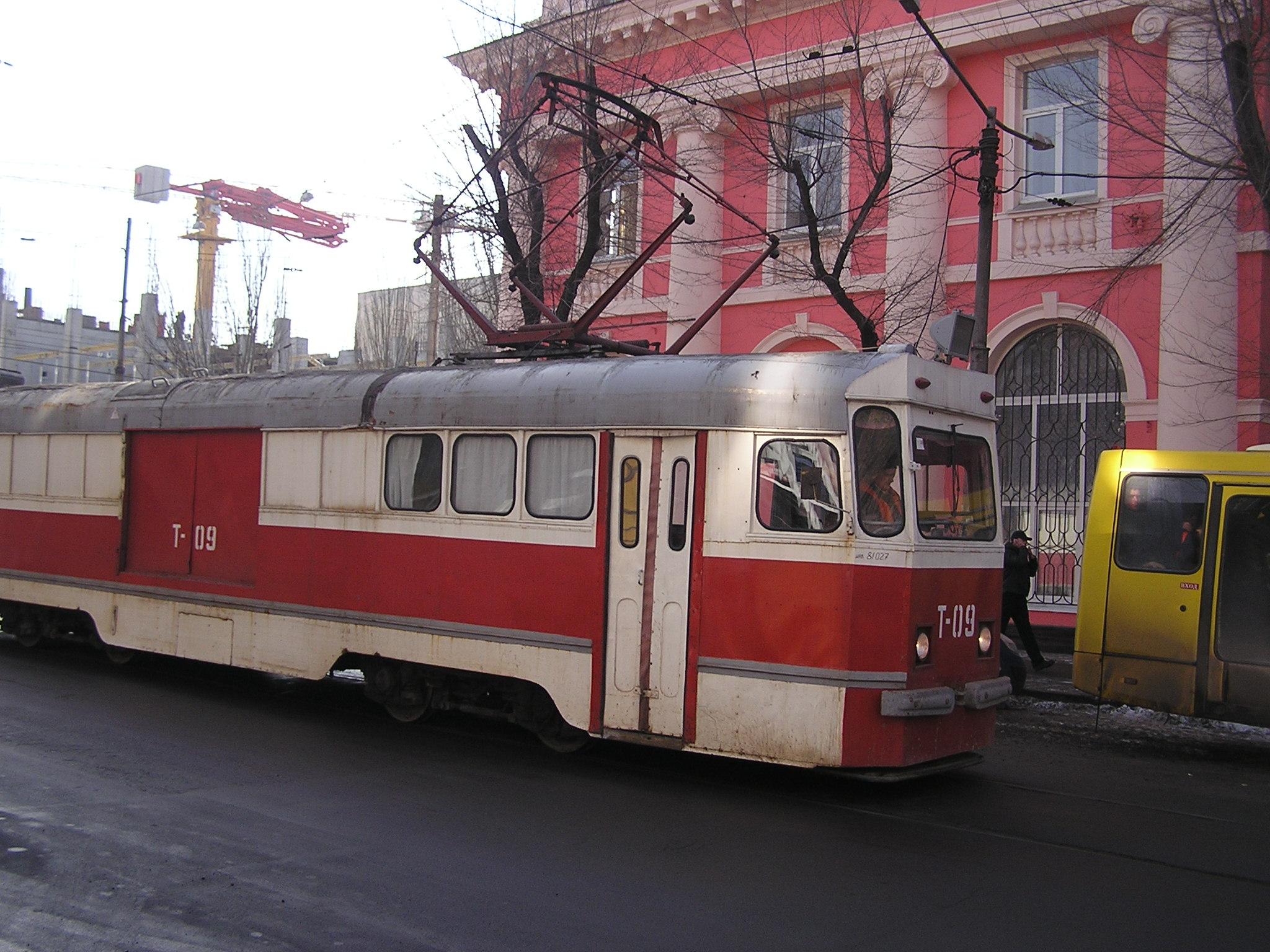

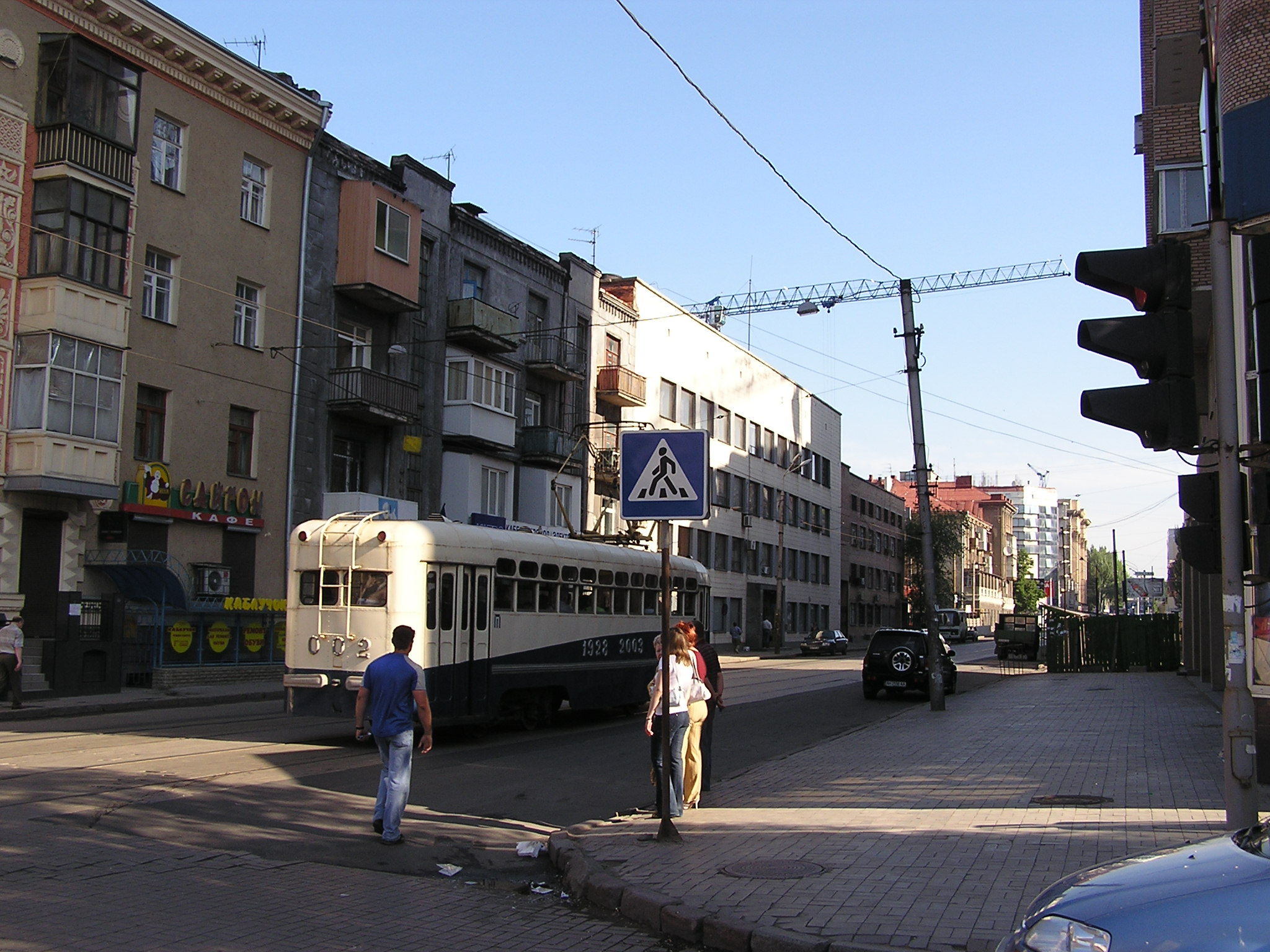

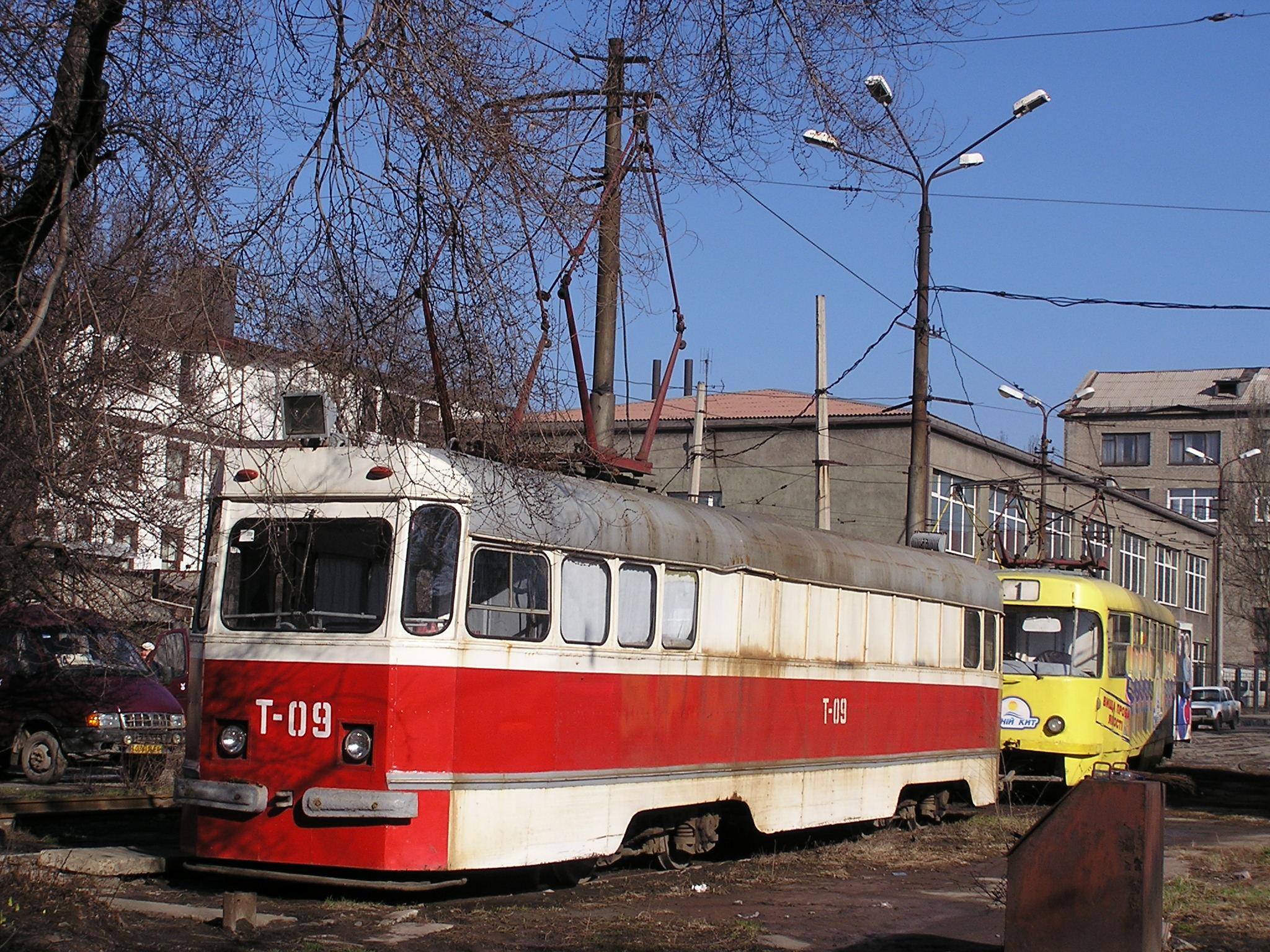
