= List of town tramway systems =

This is a list of cities that have, or once had, town tramway (urban tramway, or streetcar) systems as part of their public transport system. Due to excessive size, the original list has been divided into separate articles, based on geographical locations.

- Africa
  - Algeria
  - Egypt
  - Morocco
  - South Africa
  - Tunisia
- Asia (exclusive of India, Japan)
  - China
  - India
  - Japan
- Europe (exclusive of countries having separate lists)
  - Austria
  - Belarus
  - Belgium
  - Bosnia-Herzegovina
  - Bulgaria
  - Croatia
  - Czech Republic
  - Denmark
  - Estonia
  - Finland
  - France
  - Germany
  - Greece
  - Hungary
  - Ireland
  - Italy
  - Latvia
  - Lithuania
  - Luxembourg
  - Netherlands
  - Norway
  - Poland
  - Portugal
  - Romania
  - Russia
  - Serbia
  - Slovakia
  - Slovenia
  - Spain
  - Sweden
  - Switzerland
  - Turkey
  - Ukraine
  - United Kingdom
- Central America
- North America (exclusive of countries having separate lists)
  - Canada
  - Mexico
  - United States
- South America (exclusive of Argentina, Brazil and Chile)
  - Argentina
  - Brazil
  - Chile
- Oceania
  - Australia
  - New Zealand

This page also provides references and links for all parts of the list.

== Criteria for inclusion ==
A "town tramway service" is defined as:

- a passenger transport service,
- provided to the general public,
- operated within or close to towns, cities or villages,
- operated with railbound vehicles,
- operated on tracks built entirely or largely within public streets and roads.

Determining which towns "had trams" (or "streetcars") requires subjective judgment to some degree.

No "universal" distinctions can be made between "town tramways" and other light railways because "tramway" and "railway" practices (and laws) varied considerably between countries. For example, the prevailing European standard to distinguish between "steam tramways" and "light railways, worked by steam traction" is based on rolling stock type. Lines worked by enclosed "tramway type" locomotives are classified as "steam tramways," and those worked by unenclosed locomotives are classified as "light railways." By this standard, virtually all Japanese examples of "steam tramways" would be classified as "light railways," because none (based on the photographic record) used European-type enclosed locomotives. Also in Japan, many of today's suburban electric railways were built under "tramway" concessions ("licenses") and were eventually changed to "railway" concessions. These lines had many "tramway" characteristics as built but few today.

Some town tramway systems had lines or groups of lines that were geographically isolated from the "main" system. Long-lived examples (i.e. excepting those during formative or closing years) are tabulated if known. Examples include Volgograd, Russia and New York City, US.

== Opening and closing dates ==
"Opening date" is that upon which public passenger service was first offered. Test runs and inaugural ceremonies often occurred before this "opening date."

"Closing date" is the last "full" day on which passenger service was offered to the public. Service often extended into the small hours (i.e. past midnight) of the next day. Closure ceremonies and farewell excursions were sometimes held following the end of public service. Some lines were closed following damage suffered as the result of storms, earthquakes or war. In some such cases, closure was not made permanent for some time following the actual last day of public service. Again, the actual "last day of operation" is tabulated.

Operation of some systems was interrupted for prolonged periods (one year or longer) for various reasons, including natural- or man-made catastrophe, financial difficulty or conflict between tramway undertakings and local authorities. These are tabulated if known. Other systems (virtually all of them "small") operated only on a seasonal basis. Again, these facts are tabulated if known.

In some cases, goods (freight) service continued following closure of passenger operation. These have not been tabulated because of incomplete information. Goods service over town tramway systems is a potential category for a separate list.

== Suburban tramways, rural tramways and interurbans ==
Many town tramway networks extended across municipal boundaries. "Suburban" municipalities have, in general, not been tabulated separately except in cases of dedicated "local" or "town" services. Examples include Footscray, Australia. A general exception to this principle is the UK, where tramways operated as separate municipal undertakings by adjacent towns are tabulated (and grouped by region). Examples include Glasgow and environs.

"Suburban" extensions of town tramway networks are tabulated where known. Lines having a "rural" or "interurban" character are generally not tabulated.

Many suburban, rural and intercity light railway undertakings operated dedicated "local" or "town" service within on-line towns. These are tabulated if known.

Many suburban, rural and intercity (interurban) light railway services carried "local" passengers within various towns. Such towns are not tabulated.

The rural tramway networks of Belgium, France and The Netherlands, and US "interurban" and "rural trolley" lines (the latter found mostly in New England states) have generally not been tabulated. These categories fully deserve their own lists.

== "Paper tramways" and unknown tramways ==
Many towns planned tramways that were not built. So-called "paper tramways" are beyond the scope of this list. However, in a small number of cases, construction of a town tramway system was started (and, in a very few cases, completed) but the system did not open for public service. These are tabulated if known. Examples include Ajaccio (Corsica), France and Ulricehamn, Sweden.

Specific to the US, it is not unknown to find examples of tramways, listed in historic documents among operating systems, that did not in fact exist. It is also not uncommon to find picture postcards, dating from the late 19th and early 20th centuries, showing tramcars operating in towns where tramways did not exist. (Similar circumstances are likely to exist for other countries.) Certain examples are tabulated, primarily because they appear in well-known historic records and tabulations.

It is believed to be very likely that the historic record does not include "all" public town tramways that ever existed. Town tramways that escaped notice by historians (and regulatory authorities) are thought to have been 1.) located away from Europe, and 2.) worked by some form of traction other than electricity (e.g. horse, steam). Likely countries include Brazil (because of geographic size and incomplete records related to tramways), Mexico (because of its large number of horse- and mule-worked tramways) and the US (because of geographic size and lack of centralized records related to tramways). It is believed to be unlikely, but possible, that the historic record does not include all electric town tramways that ever existed.

== See also ==
- History of tram and light rail transit systems by country
- List of interurban railways in North America
- List of largest tram and light rail transit systems ever
- List of largest currently operating tram and light rail transit systems
- List of tram and light rail transit systems
- List of metro systems
- List of trolleybus systems
- Rapid transit

== Sources ==
=== Books ===
- Accattatis, Antonio. 2007. "Linee tranviarie a Torino" (ISBN 978-88-87911-78-7). Firenze: Phasar Edizioni.
- Arrivetz, Jean. 1956. "Les Tramways Français" (No ISBN). Lyon: Editions Omni-Presse.
- Bett, W. C., and J. C. Gillam. 1962. "Great British Tramway Networks (4th Edition)" (ISBN 0-900433-03-5). London: Light Railway Transport League.
- Blower, James M., and Robert S. Korach. 1966. "The NOT&L Story" (CERA Bulletin 109) (No ISBN). Chicago: Central Electric Railfans' Association.
- Brimson, Samuel. 1983. "The Tramways of Australia" (ISBN 0-949825-01-8). Sydney: Dreamweaver Books.
- Brinson, Carroll. 1977. "Jackson: A Special Kind of Place" (LCCN 77-081145) (No ISBN). Jackson, Mississippi: City of Jackson.
- Buckley, R. J. 1984. "Tramways and Light Railways of Switzerland and Austria" (ISBN 0-900433-96-5). Milton Keynes, UK: Light Rail Transit Association.
- Canfield, Joseph M. (ed.) 1965. "Electric Railways of Northeastern Ohio" (CERA Bulletin 108) (No ISBN). Chicago: Central Electric Railfans' Association.
- Canfield, Joseph M. (ed.) 1968. "West Penn Traction" (CERA Bulletin 110) (No ISBN). Chicago: Central Electric Railfans' Association.
- Canfield, Joseph M. 1969. "Badger Traction" (CERA Bulletin 111) (No ISBN). Chicago: Central Electric Railfans' Association.
- Canfield, Joseph M. 1972. "TM: The Milwaukee Electric Railway & Light Company" (CERA Bulletin) (No ISBN). Chicago: Central Electric Railfans' Association.
- Carlson, Norman (ed.), with Robert J. Levis (Research Coordinator). 1975. "Iowa Trolleys" (CERA Bulletin 114) (No ISBN). *Chicago: Central Electric Railfans' Association.
- Chandler, Allison. 1963. "Trolley Through the Countryside" (No ISBN). Denver: Sage Books.
- Chandler, Allison, and Stephen D. Maguire, with Mac Sebree. 1980. “When Oklahoma Took The Trolley” (Interurbans Special 71) (ISBN 0-916374-35-1). Glendale (CA), US: Interurban Press.
- Charlton, E. Harper. 1955. "Street Railways of New Orleans" (Interurbans Specian No. 17, No ISBN). Los Angeles: Interurbans.
- Cox, Harold E. 1991. "Diamond State Trolleys - Electric Railways of Delaware." Forty Fort (PA), US: Harold E. Cox.
- Davies, W. K. J. 1986. "100 years of the Belgian vicinal: SNCV/NMVB, 1885-1985 : a century of secondary rail transport in Belgium" (ISBN 0-900433-97-3). Broxbourne, UK: Light Rail Transit Association.
- Dyer, Peter, and Peter Hodge. 1988. "Cane Train: The Sugar-Cane Railways of Fiji" (ISBN 0-908573-50-2). Wellington: New Zealand Railway and Locomotive Society Inc.
- "Electric Railways of Indiana Part II, The" (CERA Bulletin 102) (No ISBN). 1958. Chicago: Central Electric Railfans' Association.
- "Electric Railways of Michigan, The" (CERA Bulletin 103) (No ISBN). 1959. Chicago: Central Electric Railfans' Association.
- Fetters, Thomas. 1978. "Palmetto Traction: Electric Railways of South Carolina" (No ISBN) Forty Fort (PA), US: Harold E. Cox.
- Fletcher, Ken. 1995. "Centennial State Trolleys: The Life and Times of Colorado Streetcars" (ISBN 0-918654-51-3). Golden (CO), US: Colorado Railroad Museum.
- Gragt, Frits van der. 1968. "Europe's Greatest Tramway Network" (No ISBN). Leiden, Netherlands: E.J. Brill.
- Hamm, Edward. 1992. "The Public Service Trolley Lines in New Jersey" (ISBN 0-933449-12-7). Poli (IL), US: Transportation Trains.
- Harper, James P. 1953. "Electric Railways of Wisconsin" (CERA Bulletin 97) (No ISBN). Chicago: Central Electric Railfans' Association.
- Hennick, Louis C., and E. Harper Charlton. 1999. "Street Railways of Louisiana" (ISBN 1-56554-564-8). Gretna (LA), US: Pelican.
- Hilton, George W. 1997. "The Cable Car in America: A New Treatise upon Cable or Rope Traction As Applied to the Working of Street and Other Railways," Revised Edition (ISBN 0-8047-3051-2). Stanford (CA), US: Stanford University Press.
- Howarth, W. Des. 1971. "Tramway Systems of Southern Africa" (No ISBN). Johannesburg: published by the author.
- Janssen, William C. 1954. "The Illinois Traction System" (CERA Bulletin 98) (No ISBN). Chicago: Central Electric Railfans' Association.
- Keenan, David. 1979. "Tramways of Sydney" (ISBN 0-909338-02-7). Sans Souci (NSW), Australia: Transit Press.
- King, B. R., and J. H. Price. 1995. "The Tramways of Portugal (4th Edition)" (ISBN 0-948106-19-0). London: Light Rail Transit Association.
- Krambles, George. 1952. "Electric Railways of Ohio" (CERA Bulletin 96) (No ISBN). Chicago: Central Electric Railfans' Association.
- Kramer, Frederick A., with Ed Wadhams. "Connecticut Company's Streetcars" (ISBN 0-911868-82-8). Newton (NJ), US: Carstens.
- MacCowan, Ian. 1992. "The Tramways of New South Wales" (ISBN 0-949600-25-3). Oakleigh (Victoria) Australia: published by the author.
- McCarthy, Ken. 1983. "Steaming Down Argent Street: A History of the Broken Hill Steam Tramways 1902-1926" (ISBN 0-909372-13-6). Sutherland (NSW), Australia: The Sydney Tramway Museum.
- Misek, Frank J. 1956. "The Electric Railways of Iowa" (CERA Bulletin 100) (No ISBN). Chicago: Central Electric Railfans' Association.
- Misek, Frank J. (ed.). 1958. "The Electric Railways of Indiana Part I" (CERA Bulletin 101) (No ISBN). Chicago: Central Electric Railfans' Association.
- Misek, Frank J. (ed.). 1960. "The Electric Railways of Indiana Part III" (CERA Bulletin 104) (No ISBN). Chicago: Central Electric Railfans' Association.
- Molloy, D. Scott. 1998. "All Aboard: The History Of Mass Transportation In Rhode Island" (ISBN 0-7524-1256-6). Mount Pleasant (SC), US: Arcadia.
- Morrison, Allen. 1989. "The Tramways of Brazil - A 130-Year Survey" (ISBN 0-9622348-1-8) . New York: Bonde Press.
- Morrison, Allen. 1992. "The Tramways of Chile - 1858 - 1978" (ISBN 0-9622348-2-6) . New York: Bonde Press.
- Morrison, Allen. 1996. "Latin America by Streetcar: A Pictorial Survey of Urban Rail Transport South of the U.S.A." (ISBN 0-9622348-3-4). New York: Bonde Press.
- Myers, Rex. 1970. "Montana’s Trolleys: Book 1, Helena" (No ISBN). Los Angeles: Interurbans.
- Olson, Russell L. 1976. "The Electric Railways of Minnesota" (No ISBN). Hopkins (MN), US: Minnesota Transportation Museum.
- Orr, Richard. 1996 O&CB: Streetcars of Omaha and Council Bluffs (ISBN 0-9653505-0-9). Omaha: published by the author.
- Pabst, Martin. 1989. "Tram & Trolley in Africa" (ISBN 3-88490-152-4). Krefeld: Röhr Verlag GMBH.
- Peschkes, Robert. "World Gazetteer of Tram, Trolleybus, and Rapid Transit Systems."
- Part One, Latin America (ISBN 1-898319-02-2). 1980. Exeter, UK: Quail Map Company.
- Part Two, Asia+USSR / Africa / Australia (ISBN 0-948619-00-7). 1987. London: Rapid Transit Publications.
- Part Three, Europe (ISBN 0-948619-01-5). 1993. London: Rapid Transit Publications.
- Part Four, North America (ISBN 0-948619-06-6). 1998. London: Rapid Transit Publications.
- Reifschneider, Felix E. 1947. "Toonervilles of the Empire State" (No ISBN). Orlando (FL), U.S.: published by the author.
- Reifschneider, Felix E. 1948. "Trolley Lines of the Empire State" (No ISBN). Orlando (FL), U.S.: published by the author.
- Röhr, Gustav. 1986. "Schmalspurparadies Schweiz," Band 1: Berner Oberland, Jura, Westschweiz, Genfer See, Wallis (ISBN 3-921679-38-9). Aachen: Schweers + Wall.
- Schramm, Jack E., and William H. Henning. 1978. "Detroit's Street Railways, Volume I" (CERA Bulletin 117) (No ISBN). Chicago: Central Electric Railfans' Association.
- Schramm, Jack E., William H. Henning and Thomas J. Devorman. 1980. "Detroit's Street Railways, Volume II" (CERA Bulletin 120) (No ISBN). Chicago: Central Electric Railfans' Association.
- Schramm, Jack E., William H. Henning and Andrews, Richard R. 1984. "Detroit's Street Railways, Volume III: When Eastern Michigan Rode the Rails" (CERA Bulletin 123) (No ISBN). Chicago: Central Electric Railfans' Association.
- Schweers, Hans. 1988. "Schmalspurparadies Schweiz," Band 2: Nordostschweiz, Mittelland, Zentralschweiz, Graubünden, Tessin (ISBN 3-921679-46-X). Aachen: Schweers + Wall.
- Sluiter, J.W. e.a. "Overzicht van de Nederlandsche Spoor- en Tramwegbedrijven" Derde, geheel herziene en uitgebreide druk (ISBN 90 5345 224 9). 2002 NVBS / uitgeverij Matrijs.
- "Smaller Electric Railways of Illinois, The" (CERA Bulletin 99) (No ISBN). 1955. Chicago: Central Electric Railfans' Association.
- Stewart, Graham. 1985. "When Trams Were Trumps in New Zealand" (OCLC 12723934). Wellington: Grantham House Publishing.
- Stewart, Graham. 1993 "The End of the Penny Section" (revised and enlarged edition) (ISBN 1-86934-037-X). Wellington: Grantham House Publishing.
- "Straßenbahnatlas ehem. Sowjetunion / Tramway Atlas of the former USSR" (ISBN 3-926524-15-4). 1996. Berlin: Arbeitsgemeinschaft Blickpunkt Straßenbahn, in conjunction with Light Rail Transit Association, London.
- "Straßenbahnatlas Rumänien" (compiled by Andreas Günter, Sergei Tarknov and Christian Blank; ISBN 3-926524-23-5). 2004. Berlin: Arbeitsgemeinschaft Blickpunkt Straßenbahn.
- Swett, Ira, with Fred Fellow. 1954. “Interurbans of Utah” (Interurbans Special 15) (No ISBN). Los Angeles: Interurbans.
- Swett, Ira. 1970. "Montana's Trolleys 2: Butte, Anaconda, BAP" (Interurbans Special 50) (No ISBN). Los Angeles: Interurbans.
- Swett, Ira. 1970. "Montana's Trolleys - III: Billings, Bozeman, Great Falls, Missoula, Proposed Lines, The Milwaukee Road (Interurbans Special 51) (No ISBN). Los Angeles: Interurbans.
- "Tramway & Light Railway Atlas - Germany 1996" (ISBN 0-948106-18-2). 1995. Berlin: Arbeitsgemeinschaft Blickpunkt Straßenbahn, in conjunction with Light Rail Transit Association, London.
- Turner, Keith. 1996. "The Directory of British Tramways: Every Passenger-Carrying Tramway, Past and Present" (ISBN 1-85260-549-9). Somerset, UK: Haynes.
- Waller, Michael H., and Peter Walker. 1992. "British & Irish Tramway Systems since 1945" (ISBN 0-7110-1989-4). Shepperton (Surrey), UK: Ian Allan Ltd.
- Eric Lee (2012). A Centenary Date with Hong Kong Tramways. Tramric & Hong Kong Tramways Ltd. ISBN 978-988-16655-0-8.
- Bona Liu 、Eric Lee、Kenny Yung 、Kelvin Pang、Joe Fung (2013). Tram Art Gallery. Tramric & Hong Kong Tramways Ltd. ISBN 978-988-16655-8-4.

=== Periodicals ===
- Motor Coach Age. Paramus (NJ), US: The Motor Bus Society. Quarterly. ISSN 0739-117X
- Tramways & Urban Transit. Peterborough, UK: LRTA Publishing Ltd. Monthly. ISSN 1460-8324
- Transit Australia. Sydney: Transit Australia Publishing. Monthly. ISSN 0818-5204
