= List of town tramway systems in Serbia =

This is a list of town tramway systems in Serbia. It includes all tram systems in Serbia, past and present; cities with currently operating systems, and those systems themselves, are indicated in bold and blue background colored rows. The use of the diamond (♦) symbol indicates where there were (or are) two or more independent tram systems operating concurrently within a single metropolitan area. Those tram systems that operated on other than standard gauge track (where known) are indicated in the 'Notes' column.

Name of System	Location	Traction Type	Date (From)	Date (To)	Notes
Trams in Belgrade	**Belgrade (Beograd / Београд)**	Horse	14 Oct 1892	1904	Gauge: 1,000 mm (3 ft 3 3/8 in)(?)
Trams in Belgrade	**Belgrade (Beograd / Београд)**	Electric	1894		Gauge: 1,000 mm (3 ft 3 3/8 in)
Trams in Niš	Niš (Ниш)	Electric	16 Nov 1930	10 Aug 1958	
Trams in Novi Sad	Novi Sad (Нови Сад)	Electric	39 Sep 1911	1958	
"Trčika"	♦ Novi Sad municipal beach	Horse	1922	1926	Beach tramway, "King of Serbia" hotel – Novi Sad municipal beach
"Trčika"	♦ Novi Sad municipal beach	Petrol (gasoline)	1926	1937	Operation forbidden by court order, 1937. However, operations continued, though with only summer service, to 1941 (or 1944).
Trams in Subotica	Subotica (Суботица)	Electric	7 Sep 1897	2 Apr 1974	
Trams in Kragujevac	Kragujevac (Крагујевац)	Electric	/	/	Tram was planned, but never established

== See also ==
- List of town tramway systems – parent article
- List of town tramway systems in Europe
- List of tram and light rail transit systems
