= List of town tramway systems in Asia =

This is a list of Asian cities and towns that have, or once had, town tramway (urban tramway, or streetcar) systems as part of their public transport system.

== Armenia ==
| Location | Name of system | Traction Type | Date (From) | Date (To) | Notes |
|---|---|---|---|---|---|
| Yerevan Երեւան | | Horse | 29 Sep 1906 | Aug 1918 (?) | |
| Yerevan Երեւան | | Electric | 12 Jan 1933 | 21 Jan 2004 | |

== Azerbaijan ==
| Location | Name of system | Traction Type | Date (From) | Date (To) | Notes |
|---|---|---|---|---|---|
| Bakı /Baku | Trams in Baku | Horse | 19 Apr 1889 | by 1 Oct 1923 | |
| Bakı /Baku | Trams in Baku | Steam | 6 Oct 1889 | ca. 1894 | |
| Bakı /Baku | Trams in Baku | Electric | 8 Feb 1924 | Jan 2004 | |
| Gəncə /Ganja | Trams in Ganja, Azerbaijan | Electric | 1 May 1933 | 16 Oct 1976 | |
| Sumqayıt /Sumqayit | Trams in Sumqayit | Electric | 11 Mar 1959 | Jul 2003 | |

== China ==
| Location | Name of system | Traction Type | Date (From) | Date (To) | Notes |
|---|---|---|---|---|---|
| Ānshān 鞍山 /Anshan | | Electric | 15 Jan 1956 | 26 Feb 2004 | . Reconstruction as light rail transit (LRT) planned. |
| Běijīng 北京 /Beijing | Peking Electric Tramway | Electric | 24 Jun 1899 17 Dec 1924 | 1900 6 May 1966 | . First system closed during the Boxer Rebellion. |
| Běijīng 北京 /Beijing | Xijiao Line | Electric | 30 Dec 2017 | | |
| Chángchūn 长春 /Changchun | Changchun Tram | Electric | 1937 (?) (or 1941 or 1942) | | . |
| Chángchūn 长春 /Changchun | Changchun Light Rail Transit | Electric | 2002 | | |
| Anren (Dayi County, Sichuan) /Chengdu | Anren tram | Electric | 2011 | | Heritage streetcar. |
| Anren (Dayi County, Sichuan) /Chengdu | Line 2 (Chengdu Tram) | Electric | 26 Dec 2018 | | |
| Dàlián 大连 /Dalian | Trams in Dalian | Electric | 25 Sep 1909 | | . |
| Dūjiāngyàn 都江堰 /Dujiangyan | Dujiangyan Tram | Electric | 15 May 2024 | | |
| Guǎngzhōu 广州 /Guangzhou | | (Electric) | | | Construction started ca. 1934, not completed. |
| Guǎngzhōu 广州 /Guangzhou | Haizhu Tram | Electric | 2014 | | |
| Harbin (Hā'ěrbīn) 哈尔滨 | | Electric | 10 Oct 1927 | 17 Jun 1987 | . |
| Huángshí 黄石 /Huangshi | Huangshi Tram | Electric | 30 Dec 2021 | | |
| Huái'ān 淮安 /Huai'an | Huai'an Tram | Electric | 28 Dec 2015 | | |
| Jiāxīng 嘉兴 /Jiaxing | Jiaxing Tram | Electric | 25 Jun 2021 | | |
| Jǐnán 济南市 /Jinan | Jiyang Line | Electric | 30 Dec 2025 | | |
| Nánjīng 南京 /Nanjing | | Steam | ? | ? | |
| Nánjīng 南京 /Nanjing | | Electric | ? | ? | |
| Nánjīng 南京 /Nanjing | Hexi tram, Qilin tram | Electric | 13 Aug 2014 | | |
| Qīngdǎo 青岛 /Qingdao | Qingdao Tram | Electric | 5 Mar 2016 | | |
| Sānyà 三亚 /Sanya | Sanya Tram | Electric | 10 Oct 2020 | | |
| Shànghǎi 上海 /Shanghai | Trams in Shanghai | Electric | 15 Mar 1908 | 1 Dec 1975 | . A Chinese source states that one tramway line was closed in 1963, however, Line 3, the last closed in 1975. |
| Shànghǎi 上海 /Shanghai | Zhangjiang Tram | Electric | 1 Jan 2010 | 1 Jun 2023 | Translohr |
| Shànghǎi 上海 /Shanghai | Songjiang Tram | Electric | 26 Dec 2018 | | |
| Shěnyáng 沈阳 /Shenyang | Trams in Shenyang | Electric | Oct 1925 | 1973 | . |
| Shěnyáng 沈阳 /Shenyang | Shenyang Modern Tram | Electric | 15 Aug 2013 | | |
| Shēnzhèn 深圳 /Shenzhen | SZTram | Electric | 28 Oct 2017 | | |
| Sūzhōu 苏州 /Suzhou | Suzhou SND Tram | Electric | 26 Oct 2014 | | |
| Tiānshuǐshì 天水 / Tianshui | Tianshui Tram | Electric | 1 May 2020 | | |
| Tiānjīn 天津 /Tianjin | Trams in Tianjin | Electric | 16 Feb 1906 | ca. 1972 | |
| Tiānjīn 天津 /Tianjin | TEDA Modern Guided Rail Tram | Electric | 10 May 2007 | 1 June 2023 | Translohr |
| Qiūběi 丘北 / Qiubei | Wenshan Tram | Electric | 15 May 2021 | | |
| Wǔhàn 武汉 / Wuhan | Wuhan Optics Valley Tram | Electric | 1 April 2018 | | |
| Zhūhǎi 珠海 /Zhuhai | Zhuhai Tram | Electric | 13 Jun 2017 | 22 Jan 2021 | Suspended since 22 Jan 2021, city voted to demolish 31 May 2021. |

== Georgia ==
| Location | Name of system | Traction Type | Date (From) | Date (To) | Notes |
|---|---|---|---|---|---|
| Gagra გაგრა | | Horse | ? | ? | |
| Poti ფოთი | | Horse | 1904 | 1932 | |
| Tbilisi თბილისი | Tbilisi | Horse | 3 Apr 1883 | 1910 | |
| Tbilisi თბილისი | Tbilisi | Electric | 25 Dec 1904 | 4 Dec 2006 | |

== Hong Kong ==
| Location | Name of system | Traction Type | Date (From) | Date (To) | Notes |
|---|---|---|---|---|---|
| Victoria, Hong Kong, North Point, Quarry Bay, Sai Wan Ho, Shau Kei Wan | Hong Kong Tramways | Electric (overhead wire) | 30 Jul 1904 | | |
| Tuen Mun, Yuen Long, Tin Shui Wai | Light Rail | Electric (overhead wire) | 18 Sep 1988 | | |

== India ==
| Location | Name of system | Traction Type | Date (From) | Date (To) | Notes |
|---|---|---|---|---|---|
| Chennai சென்னை | | Electric | 7 May 1895 | 12 Apr 1953 | (formerly Madras) |
| Delhi दिल्ली | | Electric | 6 Mar 1908 | ca. 1963 | , reintroduction planned. |
| Kanpur कानपुर | | Electric | Jun 1907 | 16 May 1933 | (formerly Cawnpore) |
| Kolkata কলকাতা | Trams in Kolkata | Horse | Jan 1881 | ? | (formerly Calcutta) |
| Kolkata কলকাতা | Trams in Kolkata | Electric | 27 Mar 1902 | | . |
| Mumbai मुंबई | | Horse | 9 May 1874 | 15 May 1908 | |
| Mumbai मुंबई | | Electric | 7 May 1907 | 31 Mar 1964 | (formerly Bombay) |

== Indonesia ==
| Location | Name of system | Traction Type | Date (From) | Date (To) | Notes |
|---|---|---|---|---|---|
| Jakarta | Bataviasche Verkeers Maatschappij (BVM) | Horse | 1869 | 1881 | |
| Jakarta | Bataviasche Verkeers Maatschappij (BVM) | Steam | 1881 | 1920 | |
| Jakarta | Bataviasche Verkeers Maatschappij (BVM) | Electric | 10 Apr 1899 | 1962 | . |
| Surabaya | Oost-Java Stoomtram Maatschappij (OJS) | Steam | 1890 | 1978 | |
| Surabaya | Oost-Java Stoomtram Maatschappij (OJS) | Electric | 27 Apr 1923 | Jan 1968 | . |
| Semarang | Samarang–Joana Stoomtram Maatschappij (SJS) | Steam | 1882 | 1940 | |

== Iran ==
| Location | Name of system | Traction Type | Date (From) | Date (To) | Notes |
|---|---|---|---|---|---|
| Tabriz | | Horse | 1901 | ? | |
| Tehran | | Horse | 1889 | 1930 | |
| Urmia | | (Electric) | | | Under planning |

== Iraq ==
| Location | Name of system | Traction Type | Date (From) | Date (To) | Notes |
|---|---|---|---|---|---|
| Baghdād بغداد | | Horse | 1871 | 194_ | . |
| Najaf / Kufa | | Horse | 1871 | 194_ | . |
| Basrah | | Steam/narrow gauge | 1900 | 194_ | . |

== Israel ==
| Location | Name of system | Traction Type | Date (From) | Date (To) | Notes |
|---|---|---|---|---|---|
| Jerusalem | Jerusalem Light Rail | Electric | 2011 | | |
| Tel Aviv | Tel Aviv Light Rail | Electric | 2023 | | Red Line runs partially in tunnels with underground stations. |

== Kazakhstan ==
| Location | Name of system | Traction Type | Date (From) | Date (To) | Notes |
|---|---|---|---|---|---|
| Almaty | Trams in Almaty | Electric | 1 Dec 1937 | 31 Oct 2015 | Service indefinitely suspended in Oct 2015 |
| Öskemen | | Electric | 6 Nov 1959 | | |
| Pavlodar | | Electric | 18 Oct 1965 | | |
| Karagandy | | Electric | 25 Aug 1950 | Sep 1997 | |
| Temirtau | | Electric | 5 Sep 1959 | | Service suspended Jan 2023 - Feb 2025 for reconstruction |

== Lebanon ==
| Location | Name of system | Traction Type | Date (From) | Date (To) | Notes |
|---|---|---|---|---|---|
| Bayrūt بيروت /Beirut | | Electric | 19 Apr 1908 | Sep 1965 | . |
| Ṭarābulus طرابلس /Tripoli | | Horse | ? | ? | . |

== Malaysia ==
| Location | Name of system | Traction Type | Date (From) | Date (To) | Notes |
|---|---|---|---|---|---|
| George Town | | Steam | 1880 | ? | |
| George Town | | Horse | 1898 | ? | |
| George Town | | Electric | 1 Jan 1906 | 1936 | . |

== Myanmar ==
| Location | Name of system | Traction Type | Date (From) | Date (To) | Notes |
|---|---|---|---|---|---|
| Mandalay မန္တလေးမ္ရို့ | | Electric | 17 Jun 1904 | by 1945 | . |
| Yangon ရန္ကုန္မ္ရို့ | | Steam | 1884 | ? | |
| Yangon ရန္ကုန္မ္ရို့ | | Electric | 15 Dec 1906 | by 1945 | . |
| Yangon ရန္ကုန္မ္ရို့ | Yangon Tram | Electric | Jan 2016 | 10 Jul 2016 | |

== North Korea ==
| Location | Name of system | Traction Type | Date (From) | Date (To) | Notes |
|---|---|---|---|---|---|
| Ch'ŏngjin 청진 (淸津) | Trams in Chongjin | Electric | 20 Aug (or 21 Aug) 1999 | | |
| P'yŏngyang 평양 (平壤) | Pyongyang Tram | Human | 1905 | 1916 | |
| P'yŏngyang 평양 (平壤) | Pyongyang Tram | Electric | 20 May 1923 | Aug 1950 | . First system closed because of war damage. |
| P'yŏngyang 평양 (平壤) | Pyongyang Tram | Electric | 15 Apr 1991 | | |

== Pakistan ==
| Location | Name of system | Traction Type | Date (From) | Date (To) | Notes |
|---|---|---|---|---|---|
| Karachi كراچى | | Steam | 20 Apr 1885 | ? | |
| Karachi كراچى | | Horse | 1886 | ? | |
| Karachi كراچى | | Petrol (gasoline) | 1909 | ? | . |
| Karachi كراچى | | Diesel | ? | 30 Apr 1975 | |

== Philippines ==
| Location | Name of system | Traction Type | Date (From) | Date (To) | Notes |
|---|---|---|---|---|---|
| Manila | | Horse | 188_ | ? | |
| Manila | | Steam | ? | ? | |
| Manila | | Electric | 10 Apr 1905 | 1944 | . |

== Singapore ==
| Location | Name of system | Traction Type | Date (From) | Date (To) | Notes |
|---|---|---|---|---|---|
| Singapore | | Steam | 1885 | 1894 | |
| Singapore | | Electric | 25 Jul 1905 | 9 Apr 1927 | . Experimental electric operations in Sep 1891 and Sep 1892. Re-introduction planned: Tampines, Woodlands or Jurong areas |

== South Korea ==
| Location | Name of system | Traction Type | Date (From) | Date (To) | Notes |
|---|---|---|---|---|---|
| Busan 부산 (釜山) | | Steam | ? | ? | |
| Busan 부산 (釜山) | | Electric | 31 Oct 1915 | 20 May 1968 | . |
| Seoul 서울 | | Electric | 1 May 1899 | 29 Nov 1968 | . |

== Sri Lanka ==
| Location | Name of system | Traction Type | Date (From) | Date (To) | Notes |
|---|---|---|---|---|---|
| Colombo | | Electric | Sep 1898 | 1960 | . |

== Syria ==
| Location | Name of system | Traction Type | Date (From) | Date (To) | Notes |
|---|---|---|---|---|---|
| Halab حلب /Aleppo | | Electric | 1929 | 1967 | . |
| Dimashq دمشق /Damascus | Trams in Damascus | Electric | 7 Feb 1907 | 1967 | . |

== Taiwan ==
| Location | Name of system | Traction Type | Date (From) | Date (To) | Notes |
|---|---|---|---|---|---|
| Kaohsiung | Circular Line (KMRT) | Electric | 2016 | | |
| Tamsui District, New Taipei City | Danhai light rail | Electric | 2018 | | |

== Thailand ==
| Location | Name of system | Traction Type | Date (From) | Date (To) | Notes |
|---|---|---|---|---|---|
| Krung Thep Maha Nakhon กรุงเทพมหานคร /Bangkok | Trams in Bangkok | Horse | 22 Sep 1888 | 1 Jan 1893 | |
| Krung Thep Maha Nakhon กรุงเทพมหานคร /Bangkok | Trams in Bangkok | Electric | 1 Jan 1893 | 1 Oct 1968 | . |
| Lopburi ลพบุรี | Trams in Lopburi | Electric | 31 Jan 1955 | 1962 | . |

== Turkey ==
| Location | Name of system | Traction Type | Date (From) | Date (To) | Notes |
|---|---|---|---|---|---|
| Antalya | Trams in Antalya | Electric | 27 Mar 1999 | | |
| Bursa | Burtram heritage tramway (T3) | Electric | 28 May 2011 | | . |
| Bursa | Burtram modern tramline (T1) | Electric | 13 Oct 2013 | | . |
| Eskişehir | EsTram | Electric | 24 Dec 2004 | | |
| Gaziantep | Gaziantep Tram | Electric | 1 Mar 2011 | | |
| Istanbul – Europe | Trams in Istanbul (1871-1966) | Horse | 30 Aug 1869 | 1912 | |
| Istanbul – Europe | Trams in Istanbul (1871-1966) | Electric | 1914 | 12 Aug 1961 | |
| Istanbul – Europe | Istanbul nostalgic tramways | Electric | 29 Dec 1990 | | . |
| Istanbul – Europe | Istanbul modern tramways | Electric | 13 Jun 1992 | | |
| Istanbul – Asia | Trams in Istanbul (1871-1966) | Electric | 8 Jun 1928 | 14 Nov 1966 | |
| Istanbul – Asia | Istanbul nostalgic tramways | Electric | 1 Nov 2003 | | |
| İzmir | Tram İzmir | Horse | ? | ? | |
| İzmir | Tram İzmir | Electric | 18 Oct 1928 | 1954 | |
| İzmir | Tram İzmir | Electric | 11 Apr 2017 | | . |
| Kocaeli | | Electric | 17 Jun 2017 | | |
| Kayseri | Kayseray | Electric | 2 Jan 2009 | | |
| Konya | Konya Tram | Electric | 28 Sep 1992 | | |
| Samsun | Samsun Tram | Electric | 10 Oct 2010 | | |

== United Arab Emirates ==
| Location | Name of system | Traction Type | Date (From) | Date (To) | Notes |
|---|---|---|---|---|---|
| Dubai | Dubai Tram | Electric | 2014 | | |

== Uzbekistan ==
| Location | Name of system | Traction Type | Date (From) | Date (To) | Notes |
|---|---|---|---|---|---|
| Samarqand | Trams in Samarkand | Electric | 1 May 1947 | 30 Aug 1973 | |
| Samarqand | Trams in Samarkand | Electric | 15 April 2017 | | |
| Toshkent | Trams in Tashkent | Horse | 13 Apr 1901 | 1913 | |
| Toshkent | Trams in Tashkent | Electric | 10 Jan 1913 | 2 May 2016 | Operation suspended 1918 - 1921 because of war (see Russian Civil War). |

== Vietnam ==
| Location | Name of system | Traction Type | Date (From) | Date (To) | Notes |
|---|---|---|---|---|---|
| Hanoi | | Electric | 10 Nov 1901 | 1990 | reintroduction planned |
| Ho Chi Minh City | | Steam | 27 Dec 1881 | ? | |
| Ho Chi Minh City | | Electric | 4 Aug 1923 | ca. 1953 | Connected Ho Chi Minh City (Saigon) with Hóc Môn and Thủ Dầu Một |

== See also ==
- List of town tramway systems in Africa
- List of town tramway systems in Central America
- List of town tramway systems in Europe
- List of town tramway systems in North America
- List of town tramway systems in Oceania
- List of town tramway systems in South America
- List of town tramway systems
- List of tram and light rail transit systems
- List of metro systems
- List of trolleybus systems
