= List of town tramway systems in Europe =

This is a list of cities and towns in Europe that have (or once had) town tramway (e.g. urban tramway) systems as part of their public transport system. Cities with currently operating systems, and those systems themselves, are indicated in bold and blue background colored rows. The use of the diamond (♦) symbol indicates where there were (or are) two or more independent tram systems operating concurrently within a single metropolitan area. Those tram systems that operated on other than standard gauge track (where known) are indicated in the 'Notes' column.

Separate lists have been created for the following European countries to improve user-friendliness and to reduce this list article's size:

- Austria
- Belarus
- Belgium
- Croatia
- Czech Republic
- Denmark
- Finland
- France
- Germany
- Greece
- Hungary
- Ireland
- Italy
- Netherlands
- Norway
- Poland
- Portugal
- Romania
- Russia
- Serbia
- Spain
- Sweden
- Switzerland
- Turkey
- Ukraine
- United Kingdom

== Albania ==
Location	Name of System	Gauge mm	Traction Type	Date (From)	Date (To)	Notes
Vlorë			Horse	?	?	A photograph of a horse-drawn tramcar, dated 1963 (Peschkes, Part Three, 1987, Page 19), establishes that Albania did have a town tramway service.

== Armenia ==
Location	Name of system	Traction Type	Date (From)	Date (To)	Notes
Yerevan Երեւան		Horse	29 Sep 1906	Aug 1918 (?)	
Yerevan Երեւան		Electric	12 Jan 1933	21 Jan 2004	

== Azerbaijan ==
Location	Name of system	Traction Type	Date (From)	Date (To)	Notes
Bakı /Baku	Trams in Baku	Horse	19 Apr 1889	by 1 Oct 1923	
Bakı /Baku	Trams in Baku	Steam	6 Oct 1889	ca. 1894	
Bakı /Baku	Trams in Baku	Electric	8 Feb 1924	Jan 2004	
Gəncə /Ganja	Trams in Ganja, Azerbaijan	Electric	1 May 1933	16 Oct 1976	
Sumqayıt /Sumqayit	Trams in Sumqayit	Electric	11 Mar 1959	Jul 2003	

== Bosnia-Herzegovina ==
Location	Name of System	Gauge mm	Traction Type	Date (From)	Date (To)	Notes
**Sarajevo**	Trams in Sarajevo	760 mm (2 ft 5 15/16 in) Bosnian gauge	Horsecar	1 Jan 1885	1 May 1895	
**Sarajevo**	Trams in Sarajevo	760 mm -> 1435 mm	Electric	1 May 1895		In 1960 regauging from 760 mm to 1435 mm

== Bulgaria ==
Location	Name of System	Gauge mm	Traction Type	Date (From)	Date (To)	Notes
**Sofia**	Trams in Sofia		Horsecar	"late 19th century"	?	
**Sofia**	Trams in Sofia	1009; 1435	Electric	1 Jan 1901		Mix of 1,009 mm (3 ft 3 23/32 in) metre gauge and 1,435 mm (4 ft 8 1/2 in) standard gauge.

== Estonia ==
Location	Name of System	Gauge mm	Traction Type	Date (From)	Date (To)	Notes
**Tallinn**	Trams in Tallinn	1,067 mm (3 ft 6 in)	Horse	24 Aug 1888	24 Sep 1919	
**Tallinn**	Trams in Tallinn	1,067 mm (3 ft 6 in)	Electric	28 Oct 1925		Note: Tallinn also operates a trolleybus network.
♦ Tallinn – Kopli			Steam	26 Jan 1916	?	
♦ Tallinn – Kopli			Petrol	26 Jan 1916	Nov 1953	
♦ Tallinn – Kopli			Electric	6 Nov 1951	[5 Nov 1953]	Connected with main Tallinn tram system, 05 Nov 1953.

== Isle of Man ==
Location	Name of System	Gauge mm	Traction Type	Date (From)	Date (To)	Notes
**Douglas**	Douglas Bay Horse Tramway	914 mm (3 ft)	Horse	7 Aug 1876		Winter service withdrawn from November 1927, current operating season early May – late September. Operation suspended 30 September 1939 – 22 May 1946 because of war.
**Douglas**	Upper Douglas Cable Tramway	914 mm (3 ft)	Cable	15 Aug 1896	19 Aug 1929	Winter service withdrawn from 1927.
Douglas – Keristal – Port Soderick	Douglas Southern Electric Tramway (Marine Drive Tramway)	1,435 mm (4 ft 8 1/2 in)	Electric	1896	15 Sep 1939	Opened to Keristal 7 August 1896, completed 1897. Operation suspended c.1914 – c.1918 because of war.
**Douglas (Derby Castle) – Laxey – Ramsey**	Manx Electric Railway	914 mm (3 ft)	Electric	7 Sep 1893		Operates seasonally, from March to November. Note for Manx Electric Railway: Opened to Groudle Glen, 7 September 1893. Extended to Laxey, 27 July 1894. Extended to Ramsey (Ballure), 5 August 1898. Completed to Ramsey (Plaza), 24 July 1899. Operation suspended Laxey – Ramsey, 30 September 1975, restored 25 June 1977.
**Laxey – Snaefell Summit**	Snaefell Mountain Railway	1,067 mm (3 ft 6 in)	Electric	21 Aug 1895		Operates only during summer season. Operation suspended 20 September 1939 – 1 June 1946 because of war. Used a third rail for a Fell brake

== Georgia ==
Location	Name of system	Traction Type	Date (From)	Date (To)	Notes
Gagra გაგრა		Horse	?	?	
Poti ფოთი		Horse	1904	1932	
Tbilisi თბილისი	Tbilisi	Horse	3 Apr 1883	1910	
Tbilisi თბილისი	Tbilisi	Electric	25 Dec 1904	4 Dec 2006	

== Latvia ==
Location	Name of System	Gauge mm	Traction Type	Date (From)	Date (To)	Notes
**Daugavpils**	Daugavpils Tramway		Horse	?	?	
**Daugavpils**	Daugavpils Tramway	1524	Electric	5 Nov 1946		
Jūrmala (Kemeri)		1000	Electric	16 Jun 1912	1935(?)	
**Liepāja**	Liepājas tramvajs	1000	Electric	26 Sep 1899		
**Riga**	Rīgas Satiksme	1524	Horse	4 Sep 1882 23 Aug 1903	1901 1909	
**Riga**	Rīgas Satiksme	1524	Electric	23 Jul 1901		Note: Riga also operates a trolleybus network.

== Lithuania ==
Location	Name of System	Gauge mm	Traction Type	Date (From)	Date (To)	Notes
Kaunas			Horse	5 Jun 1892	15 Apr 1929	
Kaunas			Steam	1914	1936	
Klaipėda (Memel)		1000	Electric	18 Aug 1904 1950	Oct 1934 1967	
Palanga			Horse	"late 19th century"	?	
Vilnius			Horse	15 Jun 1893	1915	
Vilnius			Petrol	1914	1926	
Vilnius			Electric	?	?	Gauge: unknown. Excepting microstates, Podgorica, Priština, Reykjavík and Tirana, and possibly Vilnius, are the only European capitals where electric town tramways have not (yet) been built. Note: Vilnius operates a trolleybus network.

== Luxembourg ==
Location	Name of System	Gauge mm	Traction Type	Date (From)	Date (To)	Notes
Esch-sur-Alzette canton			Electric	29 May 1927	22 Sep 1956	
Luxembourg City	Trams in Luxembourg					
Luxembourg City	Trams in Luxembourg		Horse	22 Feb 1875	?	
Luxembourg City	Trams in Luxembourg		Electric	8 Aug 1908	5 Sep 1964	
Luxembourg City	Trams in Luxembourg	1435	Electric	10 Dec 2017		

== Malta ==
Location	Name of System	Gauge mm	Traction Type	Date (From)	Date (To)	Notes
Malta			Electric	23 Feb 1905	15 Dec 1929	

== Moldova ==
Location	Name of System	Gauge mm	Traction Type	Date (From)	Date (To)	Notes
Chişinău		1000	Horse	29 Oct 1888	1914	
Chişinău		1000	Electric	25 Jan 1914	13 May 1961	

== Monaco ==
Location	Name of System	Gauge mm	Traction Type	Date (From)	Date (To)	Notes
Monte Carlo	Trams in Monaco	1000	Electric	1898	1931	

== Slovakia ==
Location	Name of System	Gauge mm	Traction Type	Date (From)	Date (To)	Notes
**Bratislava**	Trams in Bratislava	1000	Electric	27 Aug 1895		DPB also operates buses and trolleybuses
**Košice**	Trams in Košice		Horse	18 Nov 1891	28 Feb 1914	
**Košice**	Trams in Košice		Steam	7 Jul 1893	28 Feb 1914	
**Košice**	Trams in Košice	1435	Electric	28 Feb 1914		DPMK also operates buses and trolleybuses
**Trenčianske Teplice**		760	Electric	27 Jul 1909		

== Slovenia ==
Location	Name of System	Gauge mm	Traction Type	Date (From)	Date (To)	Notes
Ljubljana	Trams in Ljubljana	1000	Electric	6 Sep 1901	20 Dec 1958	Reintroduction planned
Piran	Trams in Piran	760	Electric	20 Jul 1912	31 Aug 1953	

== See also ==
- List of town tramway systems in Africa
- List of town tramway systems in Asia
- List of town tramway systems in Central America
- List of town tramway systems in North America
- List of town tramway systems in Oceania
- List of town tramway systems in South America
- List of town tramway systems
- List of tram and light rail transit systems
- List of metro systems
- List of trolleybus systems
- List of tram systems by gauge and electrification
