= List of town tramway systems in Greece =

This is a list of town tramway systems in Greece. It includes all tram systems in Greece, past and present; cities with currently operating systems, and those systems themselves, are indicated in bold and blue background colored rows. Those tram systems that operated on other than standard gauge track (where known) are indicated in the 'Notes' column.

Location	Name of System	Traction Type	Date (From)	Date (To)	Notes
Athens and Piraeus	Trams in Athens	Horse	1882	1908	Gauge: 1,000 mm (3 ft 3 3/8 in)
Athens and Piraeus	Trams in Athens	Steam	1887	1908	Electrified and incorporated into Athens tramway network
Athens and Piraeus	Trams in Athens	Electric	1908	1960	Gauge: 1,000 mm (3 ft 3 3/8 in)
**Athens**	Athens Tram	Electric	19 Jul 2004		Two modern tramlines.
Piraeus	Piraeus Harbour Tramway	Horse	1883	1908	
Piraeus	Piraeus Harbour Tramway	Electric	1910	1960	
Piraeus – Perama	Piraeus-Perama light railway	Electric	1936	1977	
Thessaloniki	Trams in Thessaloniki	Horse	1893	1907	
Thessaloniki	Trams in Thessaloniki	Electric	1907	1957	
Patras		Horse	?	?	
Patras		Steam	?	?	
Patras		Electric	1902	1917	First electric tramway in Greece, Gauge: 1,000 mm (3 ft 3 3/8 in)
Herakleion Crete	Trams in Herakleion Crete	Horse	?	?	
Herakleion Crete	Trams in Herakleion Crete	Steam	1922	1937	Industrial railway
Herakleion Crete	Trams in Herakleion Crete	Electric	?	?	
Kalamata		Electric	1910	1940	Gauge: 1,000 mm (3 ft 3 3/8 in)
Karlovasi, Samos		Horse	1905	1939	
Volos		Steam	?	?	Gauge: 600 mm (1 ft 11 5/8 in)

== See also ==
- List of town tramway systems – parent article
- List of town tramway systems in Europe
- List of tram and light rail transit systems
- List of metro systems
