= List of town tramway systems in the Republic of Ireland =

This is a list of town tramway systems in Ireland. It includes all tram systems in Ireland, past and present; cities with currently operating systems, and those systems themselves, are indicated in bold and blue background colored rows. The use of the diamond (♦) symbol indicates where there were (or are) two or more independent tram systems operating concurrently within a single metropolitan area. Those tram systems that operated on other than standard gauge track (where known) are indicated in the 'Notes' column.

Name of System	Location	Traction Type	Date (From)	Date (To)	Notes
Arigna Tramway	Arigna	Steam	1887	1959	Operated by the Cavan, Leitrim & Roscommon Light Railway and Tramway Company Limited
Cork Tramways Company	Cork	Horse	12 Sep 1872	Dec 1875	
Cork Electric Tramways and Lighting Company	Cork	Electric	2 Dec 1898	30 Sep 1931	Gauge: 900 mm (2 ft 11 7/16 in)
Dublin United Tramways	**Dublin**	Horse	1 Feb 1872	1901	
Dublin United Tramways	**Dublin**	Electric	16 May 1896	3 Jul 1949	Operation suspended during part of 1944 because of fuel (coal) shortage; service restored 2 October 1944.
Luas	**Dublin**	Electric	30 Jun 2004		**Light rail**
Dublin Southern District Tramways	♦ Dublin – Dún Laoghaire – Dalkey	Horse	17 Mar 1879	?	Opened in stages, completed 9 July 1885. Taken over by the Dublin United Tramways on 28 September 1896
Dublin Southern District Tramways	♦ Dublin – Dún Laoghaire – Dalkey	Steam	?	?	Opened in stages, completed 9 July 1885. Taken over by the Dublin United Tramways on 28 September 1896
Dublin Southern District Tramways	♦ Dublin – Dún Laoghaire – Dalkey	Electric	16 May 1896	3 Jul 1949	Opened in stages, completed 9 July 1885. Taken over by the Dublin United Tramways on 28 September 1896
Dublin and Blessington Steam Tramway	♦ Dublin – Blessington	Steam	1 Aug 1886	31 Dec 1932	Gauge: 1,600 mm (5 ft 3 in)
Blessington and Poulaphouca Steam Tramway	♦♦ Blessington – Poulaphouca	Steam	1 May 1895	1927	
Dublin and Lucan Steam Tramway Company	♦ Dublin – Lucan	Steam	1 Jun 1881	?	Gauge: 914 mm (3 ft); Opened in stages, completed 1 February 1883.
Dublin and Lucan Electric Tramway Company	♦ Dublin – Lucan	Electric	1900	14 Apr 1940	Gauge: 1,067 mm (3 ft 6 in); Separate undertaking (from main Dublin system) to 1925.
Lucan, Leixlip & Celbridge Steam Tramway	♦♦ Lucan – Leixlip	Steam	1889	1900	
Lucan & Leixlip Electric Railway	♦♦ Lucan – Leixlip	Electric	1900	1925	
DUTC Route 31	♦ Dublin – Howth	Electric	26 Jul 1900	29 Mar 1941	
Hill of Howth Tramway	♦ Howth Head	Electric	17 Jun 1901	1 Jun 1959	Gauge: 1,600 mm (5 ft 3 in). Operation suspended Jun–Sep 1944 because of fuel (coal) shortage.
Galway and Salthill Tramway	Galway – Salthill	Horse	1879	1918	Gauge: 914 mm (3 ft)

== See also ==
- List of town tramway systems – parent article
- List of town tramway systems in Europe
- List of tram and light rail transit systems
- List of metro systems
