= List of town tramway systems in Central America =

This is a list of cities and towns in Central America that have, or once had, town tramway (urban tramway, or streetcar) systems as part of their public transport system.

== Costa Rica ==
Name of System	Location	Traction Type	Date (From)	Date (To)	Notes
	Cartago	Animal	?	?	
	Cartago	Diesel	?	?	
	Guácimo	Animal	?	?	
	Guácimo	Diesel	?	?	
	Limón	Animal	?	?	
	Penshurst	Animal	?	?	
	San José	Animal	?	?	
	San José	Electric	9 April 1899	1 August 1950	

== El Salvador ==
Name of System	Location	Traction Type	Date (From)	Date (To)	Notes
	San Salvador	Horse	?	?	
	San Salvador	Accumulator (storage battery)	?	?	
	♦ San Salvador - Santa Tecla	Accumulator (storage battery)	15 October 1920	1925 (?)	
	Sonsonate	Horse	?	?	

== Guatemala ==
Name of system	Location	Traction type	Date (from)	Date (to)	Notes
	La Nueva Guatemala de la Asunción / Guatemala City	Horse	?	1917	
	La Nueva Guatemala de la Asunción / Guatemala City	Petrol (gasoline)	1918	?	
Ferrocarril de los Altos	San Felipe - Quetzaltenango	Electric	30 March 1930	September 1933	

== Honduras ==
Name of System	Location	Traction Type	Date (From)	Date (To)	Notes
	Puerto Cortés	Petrol (gasoline)	?	?	

== Nicaragua ==
Name of System	Location	Traction Type	Date (From)	Date (To)	Notes
	Bluefields	Horse	?	?	
	Corinto	Horse	?	?	
	Granada	Horse	?	?	
	Rivas	Horse	?	?	
	San Juan del Norte	Horse	?	?	Now San Juan de Nicaragua.

== Panama ==
Name of System	Location	Traction Type	Date (From)	Date (To)	Notes
	Colón	Horse	?	?	
	Colón	Accumulator (storage battery)			Construction started ca. 1910, not completed.
United Electric Tramways (1893–ca. 1900) Panama Tramways (1913–1917); Panama Electric (1917–1941)	Ciudad de Panamá (Panama City)	Electric	1 October 1893 1 August 1913	ca. 1900 31 May 1941	

== See also ==
- List of town tramway systems in Africa
- List of town tramway systems in Asia
- List of town tramway systems in Europe
- List of town tramway systems in North America
- List of town tramway systems in Oceania
- List of town tramway systems in South America
- List of town tramway systems
- List of tram and light rail transit systems
- List of metro systems
- List of trolleybus systems
