= List of town tramway systems in North America =

This is a list of cities and towns in North America that have, or once had, town tramway (urban tramway, or streetcar) systems as part of their public transport system. The use of the diamond (♦) symbol indicates where there were (or are) two or more independent tram systems operating concurrently within a single metropolitan area. Separate lists exist for the United States, Canada, and Mexico.

== Aruba ==
Name of System	Location	Traction Type	Date (From)	Date (To)	Notes
Oranjestad Streetcar	Oranjestad	Hydrail	22 Dec 2012		working system

== Barbados ==
Name of System	Location	Traction Type	Date (From)	Date (To)	Notes
	Bridgetown	Horse	?	21 Sep 1925	

== Cuba ==
Name of System	Location	Traction Type	Date (From)	Date (To)	Notes
Havana Electric Railway, División de Camagüey	Camagüey	Horse	8 Dec 1894	Mar (?) 1900	
Havana Electric Railway, División de Camagüey	Camagüey	Electric	1 May 1908	23 Feb 1952	
Tranvía Eléctrico de Cárdenas, S.A.	Cárdenas (de Cuba)	Accumulator (storage battery)	20 May 1915	Jun (?) 1929	
Cienfuegos, Palmira and Cruces Electric Railway and Power Company	Cienfuegos	Accumulator (storage battery)	13 Feb 1913	1926	
Cienfuegos, Palmira and Cruces Electric Railway and Power Company	Cienfuegos	Electric	1926	1928 (or 1935)	
Cienfuegos, Palmira and Cruces Electric Railway and Power Company	Cienfuegos	Petrol (gasoline)	1928	1954	
	♦ Cienfuegos - Hormiguero	Accumulator (storage battery)	1917	1926 (?)	
Havana Electric Railway Company	(San Cristóbal de) La Habana (Havana)	Horse	20 Sep 1859	1902 (?)	
Havana Electric Railway Company	(San Cristóbal de) La Habana (Havana)	Electric	21 Mar 1901	29 Apr 1952	,
	♦ La Habana (calle Zanja / calle Galiano) - Ciénaga (de Zapata)	Accumulator (storage battery)	8 Jan 1913	1913	
	♦ La Habana (calle Zanja / calle Galiano) - Ciénaga (de Zapata)	Electric	by 1915	1940	Extended to Marianao.
	♦ La Habana - Marianao - Guanajay	Electric	12 Nov 1906	1939	
	♦ La Habana - Marianao - Guanajay	Steam	1939	?	
	♦♦ Marianao	Electric	by 1915	by 1940	
	♦ La Habana - Rincón	Steam	1861 1940	1914 ?	
	♦ La Habana - Rincón	Electric	Jun 1914	1940	Line continues in operation, worked by diesel railcars.
	♦♦ Rincón - San Antonio de los Baños	Accumulator (storage battery)	Oct 1914	?	
	♦ La Habana - Güines	Electric	16 Mar 1907	1939	
	♦ La Habana - Güines	Steam	1939	?	Line continues in operation, worked by diesel railcars.
	♦ La Habana (Regla) - Guanabacoa	Mule	184_	1884	
	♦ La Habana (Regla) - Guanabacoa	Steam	1884	1900	
	♦ La Habana (Regla) - Guanabacoa	Electric	7 Mar 1900	15 Jun 1931	
Hershey Electric Railway	♦ La Habana (Casablanca) - Hershey - Matanzas	Electric	1 Jan 1922		Full operative upon May 2017. As December 2020 only stay in operation the branch between Hershey and Jaruco, awaiting further reparations. 5
	♦ Matanzas	Accumulator (storage battery)	17 Dec 1916	1920 (?)	
	♦ Matanzas	Electric	1920 (?)	29 Oct 1954	
	Holguín	Mule	?	?	
	Mallarquin	Mule	?	?	
	Pedro Betancourt	?	1907 (?)	?	
	Santiago (de Cuba)	Electric	12 Jan (or 8 Feb) 1908	26 Jan 1952	

== Curaçao (to the Netherlands) ==
Name of System	Location	Traction Type	Date (From)	Date (To)	Notes
	Willemstad	Animal	?	?	
	Willemstad	Petrol (gasoline)	?	1 Nov 1920	

== Dominican Republic ==
Name of System	Location	Traction Type	Date (From)	Date (To)	Notes
	(San Fernando de) Monte Cristi	Horse	1905	?	
	(San Felipe de) Puerto Plata	Horse	?	?	
	Santo Domingo (de Guzmán)	Horse	?	?	

== Haiti ==
Name of System	Location	Traction Type	Date (From)	Date (To)	Notes
	Les Cayes	Horse	?	?	
	Port-au-Prince	Horse	17 Jan 1878	Apr 1888	
	Port-au-Prince	Steam	18 Apr 1897	?	
	Port-au-Prince	Petrol (gasoline)	?	1932	
	Port-de-Paix	Horse	?	?	

== Jamaica ==
Name of System	Location	Traction Type	Date (From)	Date (To)	Notes
	Kingston	Animal	?	?	
	Kingston	Electric	31 Mar 1899	Aug 1948	

== Martinique (to France) ==
Name of System	Location	Traction Type	Date (From)	Date (To)	Notes
	Saint-Pierre	Animal	?	8 May 1902	Town destroyed by eruption of Mont-Pelée volcano.

== Puerto Rico (to U.S.) ==
Name of System	Location	Traction Type	Date (From)	Date (To)	Notes
Ferrocarril Urbano de la Villa de Mayagüez	Mayagüez	Horse	27 Feb 1875	3 Feb 1886	The city's first horse-powered tramway was a single line of 1.5 km (0.9 mi) long and used a track gauge of 1450 mm (57 inches).
Sociedad Anónima Tranvía de Mayagüez	Mayagüez	Horse	28 May 1895	1912	The city's second horse-powered tramway was a network of 8.6 km (5.3 mi) long with two branches and used a track gauge of 610 mm (24 inches).
Mayagüez Tramway Company	Mayagüez	Accumulator (storage battery)	1915	18 Jan 1927	This city's electric battery-powered tramway was 2.4 km (3.3 mi) long and used a track gauge of 1000 mm (39 inches).
Sociedad del Tranvía de Ponce	Ponce	Horse	17 Jun 1880	18 Apr 1883	Single line of 4 km (2.5 mi) long and a track gauge of 1000 mm (39 inches).
Ponce Railway & Light Company	Ponce	Electric	29 Apr 1902	24 Dec 1927	Extended to a loop of 7.7 km (4.8 mi) long and a track gauge of 1000 mm (39 inches).
Tranvía de la Capital a Río Piedras (1880–1898) / San Juan & Rio Piedras Railroad (1899)	San Juan	Steam	1880	1900	Nicknamed as "Tranvía de Ubarri" by its builder, Pablo Ubarri, Count of Santurce. Powered by small steam locomotives that run over a single line between Old San Juan and Rio Piedras of 11.3 km (7 mi) long and a track gauge of 750 mm (29.5 inches).
San Juan Light & Transit Co. (1900–1906) / Porto Rico Railway, Light & Power Co. (1906–1942) / San Juan - Santurce Street Railway Service of Puerto Rico Water Resources Authority (1942–1946)	San Juan	Electric	1 Jan 1901	1 Oct 1946	Extended to a network of 23.3 km (14.5 mi) long and refitted to a track gauge of 1435 mm (56.5 inches). From 1928 shortened to a loop of 12.7 km (7.9 mi) from Old San Juan to Santurce.
"Caguas Tramway" - Porto Rico Railways Company	San Juan - Rio Piedras - Caguas	Steam	1908	1928	First intended as electric tramway, finally operated as steam railroad of 28 km (17 mi) long and a track gauge of 1000 mm (39 inches). Destroyed by Hurricane San Felipe.

== See also ==
- List of town tramway systems in Africa
- List of town tramway systems in Asia
- List of town tramway systems in Central America
- List of town tramway systems in Europe
- List of town tramway systems in Oceania
- List of town tramway systems in South America
- List of town tramway systems
- List of tram and light rail transit systems
- List of metro systems
- List of trolleybus systems
