= List of town tramway systems in Norway =

This is a list of town tramway systems in Norway. It includes all tram systems in Norway, past and present; cities with currently operating systems are indicated in bold. Those tram systems that operated on other than standard gauge track (where known) are indicated in the 'Notes' column.

Location	Name of system	Gauge (mm)	Traction type	Date (from)	Date (to)	Notes
Bergen	Trams in Bergen		Electric	3 Jul 1897	31 Dec 1965	
Bergen	**Bergen Light Rail**		Electric	22 Jun 2010	-	
Oslo	**Trams in Oslo**		Horse	6 Oct 1875	14 Jan 1900	
Oslo	**Trams in Oslo**		Electric	3 Mar 1894	-	Note: Oslo also operated a trolleybus network.
Trondheim	Trondheim Tramway	1,000 mm (3 ft 3 3/8 in)	Electric	3 Dec 1901	12 Jun 1988	
Trondheim	**Gråkallen Line**	1,000 mm (3 ft 3 3/8 in)	Electric	18 Aug 1990	-	

== See also ==
- List of town tramway systems – parent article
- List of town tramway systems in Europe
- List of tram and light rail transit systems
- List of metro systems
