= List of town tramway systems in Sweden =

This is a list of town tramway systems in Sweden. It includes all tram systems in Sweden, past and present; cities with currently operating systems, and those systems themselves, are indicated in bold and blue background colored rows. The use of the diamond (♦) symbol indicates where there were (or are) two or more independent tram systems operating concurrently within a single metropolitan area. Those tram systems that operated on other than standard gauge track (where known) are indicated in the 'Notes' column.

As at 2016, there were plans for new systems in several Swedish cities: Helsingborg, Jönköping, Linköping, Lund, Malmö, and Uppsala. The Lund tramway opened on 13 December 2020. The new Uppsala tramway is planned for opening in 2029. The other systems have not scheduled construction start dates.

Name of system	Location	Traction type	Date (from)	Date (to)	Notes
	Gävle	Electric	13 Nov 1909	5 Apr 1956	
**Gothenburg tram network**	**Gothenburg** (Göteborg)	Horse	24 Sep 1879	28 Oct 1902	
**Gothenburg tram network**	**Gothenburg** (Göteborg)	Electric	18 Aug 1902	-	
	Helsingborg	Electric	11 Jun 1903	2 Sep 1967	
	♦ Ramlösa	Horse	Jun 1877	Sep 1890	Operated only during summer season; replaced by Helsingborg electric tramway line.
	Jönköping	Electric	12 Jul 1907	7 Jun 1958	
	Karlskrona	Electric	21 Dec 1910	15 May 1949	
	Kiruna	Electric	1 Oct 1907	28 May 1958	Heritage tramway: 1984 – 14 Aug 1993
	Limhamn	Horse	1 Jul 1900	Sep 1914	
	Ljunghusen	Horse	May 1905	Aug 1924	
**Lund tramway**	**Lund**	Electric	13 Dec 2020	-	First light rail system to be built in a new city since early 20th century.
**Trams in Malmö**	**Malmö**	Horse	28 Aug 1887	2 Feb 1907	
**Trams in Malmö**	**Malmö**	Electric	20 Dec 1906	27 Apr 1973	Heritage tramway: opened 15 Aug 1987
**Trams in Norrköping**	**Norrköping**	Electric	10 Mar 1904	-	
Trams in Stockholm (Stockholms Spårvägar)	**Stockholm**	Horse	10 Jul 1877	10 Feb 1905	
Trams in Stockholm (Stockholms Spårvägar)	**Stockholm**	Steam	11 Aug 1887	15 Nov 1901	
Trams in Stockholm (Stockholms Spårvägar)	**Stockholm**	Petrol	14 Apr 1924	1 Mar 1929	One line over Gärdet, where wires were not allowed.
Trams in Stockholm (Stockholms Spårvägar)	**Stockholm**	Electric	5 Sep 1901	1967	Note for Stockholm: Two systems, north and south, were connected at Slussen on 1 Apr 1922. The system was closed down piece by piece 1950-1967, after which only the Nockeby and Lidingö lines remained.
**Djurgårdslinjen**	**Stockholm**	Electric	Jun 1991	-	Heritage tramline
**Tvärbanan**	**Stockholm**	Electric	2000	-	**Light rail**
**Spårväg City**	**Stockholm**	Electric	2010	-	Modern tramline
**Lidingöbanan**	♦ **Stockholm–Lidingö**	Electric	26 Oct 1907	-	Separated from the tram network in 1967.
**Nockebybanan**	♦ **Nockeby, Stockholm**	Electric	1914	-	**Light rail**. Separated from the tram network in 1950.
Långängsbanan	♦ Stocksund	Electric	15 Oct 1911	25 Sep 1966	In 1934 converted from 1,435 mm gauge tramway to 891 mm narrow-gauge railway.
	Sundsvall	Electric	21 Dec 1910	9 Nov 1952	
	Ulricehamn	(Electric)	-	-	Line completed 1911, test trips operated. Not opened for public service because of an accident, and a dispute over how much passengers should pay as fare.
	Uppsala	Electric	11 Sep 1906	12 Oct 1953	
Uppsala Tramway	Uppsala	Electric	2029 (Planned)		Under Construction

== See also ==
- List of town tramway systems – parent article
- List of town tramway systems in Europe
- List of tram and light rail transit systems
- List of metro systems
