= Trams in Niš =

Niš tram
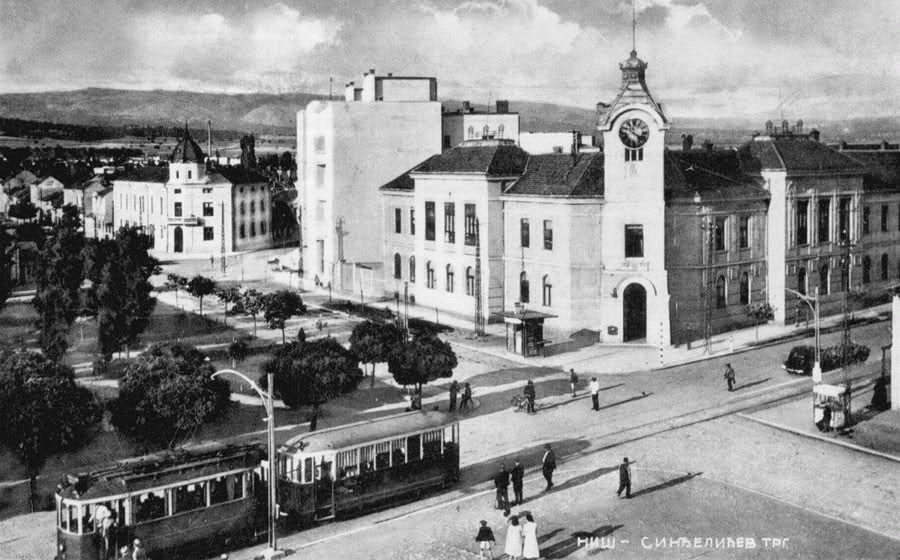

Overview
- Locale: Niš
- Transit type: Tram

Operation
- Began operation: November 16, 1930
- Ended operation: August 10, 1958

The Niš tram system was a tram system in Niš, Serbia. It was in operation from November 16, 1930, to August 10, 1958.

== Origins ==
The tram was built with money from German war reparations from World War I. The sum of 21,274,928 dinars paid for the costs of installing rails, trams and the tram station. Along with this, two power plants were built and the electricity grid was expanded.

The tram went from the train station to Niška Banja. During operations the system transported a total of approximately 7,658,000 passengers.

== Demise ==
In 1956, the traffic director of the municipality Niš announced the end of the tram system. In 1958, fifteen trams were removed from service and sold. Buses replaced trams in a ceremony on August 10.

Today, the bus line 1 (Minovo naselje – Niška Banja) roughly follows the route of the old tram.

== Future plans ==
In late 2009, the city of Niš developed plans to bring back a tram line. General Milojko Lešjanin Street and part of Voždova Street could become pedestrian only streets. If this is done, then there would be room for trams, even in the city center. This would be of significant ecological benefit, as the buses along this route produce some 21 tons of CO_{2}.

A survey of 3,000 people in Niš showed that some 88.7 percent of those surveyed would like to see a tram line in the city.
