= List of street railways in Mexico =

This is a list of street railways in Mexico by state. The list includes all tram systems, past and present.

Note for Mexico (in general): Approximately 1,000 towns had tramways. Most were worked by animal traction, and connected railway stations with town centers. Some lines were worked by small steam locomotives. Horse- or mule-drawn vehicles used on some lines were eventually equipped with petrol (gasoline) engines (Morrison). Opening and closing dates are difficult to establish because the Mexican government did not conduct surveys of tramway systems between 1907 and 1922 (Morrison).

Data for 1907 were published in 1912, by which time the Mexican Revolution (1910–1921) was underway. Thereafter, government statistics included only those tramway systems with federal concessions—e.g. intercity lines—for the years 1922–1934.

The tables below includes fewer than half the number of towns stated by Morrison. Peschkes (Part One, 1980, pages 10–38) tabulates 406 systems, and states (Part Four, 1998, page 140) that an additional 51 systems had been located. The list below excludes hacienda tramways, which transported crops, other goods and passengers to and from plantations.

== Aguascalientes ==
| Name of System | Location | Traction Type | Date (From) | Date (To) | Notes |
|---|---|---|---|---|---|
| Compañía Productora y Abastecedora de Potencia Eléctrica de Aguascalientes | Aguascalientes | Horse | Feb 1883 | ? | |
| Compañía Productora y Abastecedora de Potencia Eléctrica de Aguascalientes | Aguascalientes | Electric | 5 May 1904 | 1931 | |
| | Asientos – Presa de la Huerta | Steam | ? | ? | |
| | Calvillo | Mule | ? | ? | |
| | Lagos | Mule | ? | ? | |
| | Rincón de Romos | Mule | ? | ? | |
| | ♦ Rincón de Romos – Tepezalá | Mule | ? | ? | |

== Baja California ==
| Name of System | Location | Traction Type | Date (From) | Date (To) | Notes |
|---|---|---|---|---|---|
| | Ensenada | Mule | ? | ? | |
| | Mexicali | Mule | ? | ? | |
| | Tecate | Mule | ? | ? | |
| | Tijuana | Mule | ? | ? | |

== Baja California Sur ==
| Name of System | Location | Traction Type | Date (From) | Date (To) | Notes |
|---|---|---|---|---|---|
| | La Paz | Mule | ? | ? | |
| | Santa Rosalía | Steam | ? | ? | |
| | Todos Santos | Mule | ? | ? | |

== Campeche ==
| Name of System | Location | Traction Type | Date (From) | Date (To) | Notes |
|---|---|---|---|---|---|
| | (San Francisco de) Campeche – Lerma | Mule | ? | ? | |
| | (San Francisco de) Campeche – Lerma | Steam | ? | ? | |
| | (San Francisco de) Campeche – Lerma | Petrol (gasoline) | ? | 1941 | |
| | Chencán – Morelos – Chumal | Mule | ? | ? | |
| | Ciudad del Carmen | Mule | ? | ? | |
| | El Pital – Matamoros | Mule | ? | ? | |
| | El Pital – Escarcega | Mule | ? | ? | |

== Chiapas ==
| Name of System | Location | Traction Type | Date (From) | Date (To) | Notes |
|---|---|---|---|---|---|
| | Arriaga | Mule | ? | ? | |
| | Comitán (de Domínguez) | Mule | ? | ? | |
| | San Cristóbal (de las Casas) | Mule | ? | ? | |
| | Tapachula | Mule | ? | ? | |
| | Tonalá | Mule | ? | ? | |
| | Tuxtla Gutiérrez | Mule | ? | ? | |

== Chihuahua ==
| Name of System | Location | Traction Type | Date (From) | Date (To) | Notes |
|---|---|---|---|---|---|
| | Casas Grandes | Mule | ? | ? | |
| | Cerrito (or Cerritos) | Mule | ? | ? | see note. |
| Compañía Eléctrica y de Ferrocarriles de Chihuahua | Chihuahua | Mule | 1887 | 1908 | |
| Compañía Eléctrica y de Ferrocarriles de Chihuahua | Chihuahua | Electric | 4 Oct 1908 | 1922 | |
| | (Santa Rosalía de) Camargo | Mule | ? | ? | |
| El Paso Electric Company, Transportation Division (El Paso City Lines) | Ciudad Juárez | Mule | Oct 1882 | ? | |
| El Paso Electric Company, Transportation Division (El Paso City Lines) | Ciudad Juárez | Electric | 11 Jan 1902 | 30 Jul 1973 | Operation suspended Aug 1966 – Nov 1967, and Jul 1969 – Nov 1970. International tramway from El Paso, Texas. (See also: List of town tramway systems in North America#Texas.) Allen Morrison, The Tramways of Ciudad Juárez |
| | Delicias | Mule | ? | ? | |
| | Jiménez | Mule | ? | ? | |
| | Ojinaga | Mule | ? | ? | |
| Ferrocarril Urbano de Hidalgo del Parral | (Hidalgo del) Parral | Electric | Feb 1908 | 11 Oct 1908 | , see note. |
| | San Francisco del Oro | Mule | ? | ? | |
| | San José | Mule | ? | ? | |

- Note for Cerrito: Peschkes (Part One, 1980, Page 28) states that the location of this town is "unknown."
- Note for (Hidalgo del) Parral: Peschkes (Part One, 1980, page 17) states that animal and electric traction was used in Parral. Morrison states that "Parral never had a horse tram line." Operation of electric tramway suspended (after fewer than nine months) because of electric substation equipment breakdown. It is not known whether the system reopened.

== Coahuila ==
| Name of System | Location | Traction Type | Date (From) | Date (To) | Notes |
|---|---|---|---|---|---|
| | Allende | Horse | ? | ? | |
| | Monclova | Horse | ? | ? | |
| | Monclova | Petrol (gasoline) | ? | ? | |
| | ♦ Monclova – Pánuco, Coahuila | Steam | ? | ? | |
| | Piedras Negras | Horse | ? | ? | |
| | Saltillo | Horse | ? | ? | |
| | Saltillo | Accumulator (storage battery) | ? | ? | |
| | Torreón | Horse | 1900 | ? | |
| | Torreón | Electric | Dec 1904 | ca. 1940 | ,. See also Lerdo (Durango) – Gómez Palacio (Durango) – Torreón. |
| | ♦ Torreón – San Pedro (de las Colonias) | Horse | ? | ? | |
| | ♦ San Pedro de las Colonias | Horse | ? | ? | |
| | ♦ Torreón – Matamoros (de la Laguna) | Horse | ? | ? | |
| | Viesca | Horse | ? | ? | |

== Colima ==
| Name of System | Location | Traction Type | Date (From) | Date (To) | Notes |
|---|---|---|---|---|---|
| | Colima – Villa de Alvarez | Mule | ? | ? | |
| | Colima – Villa de Alvarez | Petrol (gasoline) | ? | ? | |
| | Manzanillo | Petrol (gasoline) | ? | ? | |

== Durango ==
| Name of System | Location | Traction Type | Date (From) | Date (To) | Notes |
|---|---|---|---|---|---|
| | Dinamita | Mule | ? | ? | |
| | Durango – Cerro de Mercado | Mule | ? | ? | |
| | Durango – Cerro de Mercado | Accumulator (storage battery) | ? | ? | |
| | Lerdo – Gómez Palacio | Horse | 1890 | ? | |
| | Lerdo – Gómez Palacio | Electric | 3 Mar 1901 | 3 Mar, 1953 | , See note. |
| | Pedriceña | Mule | ? | ? | |

- Note for Lerdo – Gómez Palacio: Gómez Palacio – Torreón (Coahuila) opened 3 July 1901. See also Torreón, Coahuila.

== Guanajuato ==
| Name of System | Location | Traction Type | Date (From) | Date (To) | Notes |
|---|---|---|---|---|---|
| | Acámbaro | Horse | ? | ? | |
| | ♦ Acámbaro – San Pablo | Horse | ? | ? | |
| | Apaseo el Alto | Horse | ? | ? | |
| Ferrocarril Urbano de Celaya | Celaya | Horse | 188_ | May 1954 | . Believed to be the last town tramway in Mexico (and North America) worked by horse traction. |
| Ferrocarril de Celaya a Santa Cruz | Celaya – Roque – Plancarte / Santa Cruz (de Juventino Rosas) | Horse | ca 1893 | ? | |
| Ferrocarril de Celaya a Santa Cruz | Celaya – Roque – Plancarte / Santa Cruz (de Juventino Rosas) | Petrol (gasoline) | ? | 1940 | |
| | Cortazar – Villagrán | Horse | ? | ? | |
| | Dolores Hidalgo (Cuna de la Independencia Nacional) | Horse | ? | ? | |
| | Guanajuato – Marfil | Horse | ? | ? | |
| | Guanajuato – Marfil | Petrol (gasoline) | ? | ? | |
| | Irapuato | Horse | ? | ? | |
| | Irapuato | Petrol (gasoline) | ? | ? | |
| | León | Horse | ? | ? | |
| | León | Petrol (gasoline) | ? | ? | |
| | Pénjamo | Horse | ? | ? | |
| | Salamanca | Horse | ? | ? | |
| | ♦ Salamanca – San Juan | Horse | ? | ? | |
| | (San Andrés de) Salvatierra – San José | Horse | ? | ? | |
| | San Felipe | Horse | ? | ? | |
| | San Francisco del Rincón | Horse | ? | ? | |
| | San Luis de la Paz | Horse | ? | ? | |
| | San Miguel de Allende | Horse | ? | ? | |
| | Silao (de la Victoria) | Horse | ? | ? | |
| | Silao (de la Victoria) | Steam | ? | ? | |
| | Silva – Jerécuaro | Horse | ? | ? | |
| | Silva – Jerécuaro | Steam | ? | ? | |
| | Valle de Santiago | Horse | ? | ? | |

== Guerrero ==
| Name of System | Location | Traction Type | Date (From) | Date (To) | Notes |
|---|---|---|---|---|---|
| | Chilpancingo (de los Bravo) | Horse | ? | ? | |
| | Iguala (de la Independencia) | Horse | ? | ? | |

== Hidalgo ==
| Name of System | Location | Traction Type | Date (From) | Date (To) | Notes |
|---|---|---|---|---|---|
| | Acopinalco – Chimalpan | Horse | ? | ? | |
| | Amaninalco – Iroló | Horse | ? | ? | |
| | Huichapan – San Juan del Río, Querétaro | Horse | ? | ? | |
| | Los Romeros | Horse | ? | ? | |
| | Pachuca | Horse | ? | ? | |
| | Pachuca | Steam | ? | ? | |
| | Pachuca | Electric | Sep (?) 1913 | ca. 1940 | |
| | San Agustín (Tlaxiaca) | Horse | ? | ? | |
| | San Idefonso | Horse | ? | ? | |
| | San Vicente – Estancia | Horse | ? | ? | |
| | Sandoval | Horse | ? | ? | |
| | Tetlapayac – Tetlapaya | Horse | ? | ? | |
| | Tula de Allende | Horse | ? | ? | |
| | Tulancingo de Bravo | Horse | ? | ? | |

== Jalisco ==
| Name of System | Location | Traction Type | Date (From) | Date (To) | Notes |
|---|---|---|---|---|---|
| | Atenquique | Horse | ? | ? | |
| | Encarnación de Diaz | Horse | ? | ? | |
| | Guadalajara | Horse | Jan 1878 | ? | |
| | Guadalajara | Electric | 14 Sep 1907 | 1944 | |
| | ♦ (San Pedro) Tlaquepaque | Horse | ? | ? | |
| | La Barca | Horse | ? | 1953 | |
| | Lagos de Moreno | Horse | ? | ? | |
| | Ocotlán | Horse | ? | ? | |
| | San Juan de los Lagos | Horse | ? | ? | |
| | San Marcos | ? | ? | ? | |
| | Tala | Horse | ? | ? | |
| | Tepatitlán (de Morelos) | Horse | ? | ? | |
| | Tequila | Horse | ? | 1952 | |
| | Zapotlán (del Rey) | ? | ? | ? | |
| | Zapotlanejo | ? | ? | ? | |

== Estado de México (State of Mexico) ==
| Name of System | Location | Traction Type | Date (From) | Date (To) | Notes |
|---|---|---|---|---|---|
| | El Oro de Hidalgo | Horse | ? | ? | |
| | Hueyapan – Ciudad Pelon | ? | ? | ? | |
| | Ixtlahuaca de Rayón – Mani | Horse | ? | ? | |
| | La Compañía | Horse | ? | ? | |
| | Otumba (de Gómez Farías) – San Lorenzo – Cuantento – Tlaquiltchan, Hidalgo | Horse | ? | ? | |
| | Otumba (de Gómez Farías) – San Lorenzo – Cuantento – Tlaquiltchan, Hidalgo | Petrol (gasoline) | ? | ? | |
| | San Felipe del Progreso | Horse | ? | ? | |
| | San Rafael – Zavaleta | Steam | ? | ? | |
| | Tecpatepec – Palma | Steam | ? | ? | |
| | Tenango del Aire | Horse | ? | ? | |
| | Tenango del Aire | Petrol (gasoline) | ? | ? | |
| | Teotihuacán (de Arista) – San Juan | Horse | ? | ? | |
| | Teotihuacán (de Arista) – San Juan | Steam | ? | ? | |
| | Teotihuacán (de Arista) – San Juan | Diesel | ? | ? | |
| | Tlalnepantla de Baz | Petrol (gasoline) | ? | ? | |
| | Toluca (de Lerdo) | Horse | ? | ? | |
| | Toluca (de Lerdo) | Petrol (gasoline) | ? | ? | |
| | Toluca (de Lerdo) | Accumulator (storage battery) | ? | ? | |
| | Toluca – San Juan | Petrol (gasoline) | ? | ? | |
| | Zacatepec | Horse | ? | ? | |
| | Zoquiapán | Diesel | ? | ? | |
| | Zumpango (de Ocampo) | Horse | ? | ? | |

== Mexico City ==
| Name of System | Location | Traction Type | Date (From) | Date (To) | Notes |
|---|---|---|---|---|---|
| Servicio de Transportes Eléctricos (Streetcars in Mexico City, Mexico City Light Rail) | Ciudad de México /Mexico City | Horse | 12 Dec 1857 | 24 Nov, 1932 | |
| Servicio de Transportes Eléctricos (Streetcars in Mexico City, Mexico City Light Rail) | Ciudad de México /Mexico City | Steam | 1865 | ? | |
| Servicio de Transportes Eléctricos (Streetcars in Mexico City, Mexico City Light Rail) | Ciudad de México /Mexico City | Accumulator (storage battery) | 1896 | 1900 | |
| Servicio de Transportes Eléctricos (Streetcars in Mexico City, Mexico City Light Rail) | Ciudad de México /Mexico City | Petrol (gasoline) | ? | 1934 | |
| Servicio de Transportes Eléctricos (Streetcars in Mexico City, Mexico City Light Rail) | Ciudad de México /Mexico City | Electric | 15 Jan 1900 | 19 May 1979 | Operation suspended 1911–1915 because of revolution. Mexico City Light Rail (south end of ex-Tlalpan line) continues in operation. |
| Ferrocarril de Tacubaya | Tacubaya | Steam | 1896 | 1910 | |

== Michoacán (de Ocampo) ==
| Name of System | Location | Traction Type | Date (From) | Date (To) | Notes |
|---|---|---|---|---|---|
| | Lázaro Cárdenas – Río Grijalva | Horse | ? | ? | |
| | La Piedad de Cavadas | Horse | ? | 1941 | |
| | La Piedad de Cavadas | Petrol (gasoline) | ? | ? | |
| | Los Reyes (de Salgado) | Horse | ? | ? | |
| | Mineral del Oro | ? | ? | ? | |
| | Morelia | Horse | ? | ? | |
| | Morelia | Petrol (gasoline) | ? | ? | |
| | Morelia | Accumulator (storage battery) | ? | ? | |
| | (Vista Hermosa de) Negrete | Horse | ? | ? | |
| | Pátzcuaro | Horse | 188_ | 191_ | |
| | Pátzcuaro | Petrol (gasoline) | ? | ? | |
| | Tacámbaro (de Codallos) | Horse | ? | ? | |
| | Uruapan | Horse | ? | ? | |
| | Yurécuaro | Horse | ? | ? | |
| | Zamora | Horse | 188_ | 191_ | |
| | Zamora | Petrol (gasoline) | ? | ? | |
| | (Heroica) Zitácuaro | Horse | ? | ? | |

== Morelos ==
| Name of System | Location | Traction Type | Date (From) | Date (To) | Notes |
|---|---|---|---|---|---|
| | La heroica e histórica Cuautla de Morelos /Cuautla | Horse | ? | ? | |
| | Cuernavaca | Horse | ? | ? | |
| | Nenampa – El Guarda (Tlalpan), Districto Federal | Horse | ? | ? | |
| | (Juan) Pagaza – Tlaquiltenango | Horse | ? | ? | |
| | (Juan) Pagaza – Tlaquiltenango | Petrol (gasoline) | ? | ? | |
| | Puente de Ixtla | Horse | ? | ? | |
| | Santa Ines | ? | ? | ? | |
| | Yautepec (de Zaragoza) | Horse | ? | ? | |
| | Zacatepec (de Hidalgo) – Jojutla (de Juárez) | Horse | ? | ? | |
| | ♦ Zacatepec (de Hidalgo) – Tlatizapan | Horse | ? | ? | |

== Nayarit ==
| Name of System | Location | Traction Type | Date (From) | Date (To) | Notes |
|---|---|---|---|---|---|
| | Acaponeta | Horse | ? | ? | |
| | Compostela | Horse | ? | ? | |
| | Ruíz | Horse | ? | ? | |
| | San Blas | Horse | ? | ? | |
| | Tepic | Horse | ? | ? | |

== Nuevo León ==
| Name of System | Location | Traction Type | Date (From) | Date (To) | Notes |
|---|---|---|---|---|---|
| | Anáhuac | Horse | ? | ? | |
| | Guadalupe – Minas Viejas | Horse | ? | ? | |
| | Linares – San José | Petrol (gasoline) | ? | ? | |
| | Los Aldamas | Horse | ? | ? | |
| | Montemorelos | Horse | ? | ? | |
| | Monterrey | Horse | 1883 | ? | |
| | Monterrey | Electric | 15 Jul 1907 | 30 May 1932 | |
| | Villa de Santa María de Los Aldamas /Villa Aldamas – Doctor Coss | Horse | ? | ? | |

== Oaxaca ==
| Name of System | Location | Traction Type | Date (From) | Date (To) | Notes |
|---|---|---|---|---|---|
| | Ixtepec | Horse | ? | ? | |
| | Loma Bonita | Horse | ? | ? | |
| | Oaxaca (de Juárez) | Horse | ca. 1890 | 193_ | |
| | Oaxaca (de Juárez) | Accumulator (storage battery) (?) | ? | ? | |
| | Oaxaca (de Juárez) | Petrol (gasoline) (?) | ? | ? | |
| | ♦ Oaxaca – Ejutla de Crespo | Horse | ? | ? | |
| | ♦ Oaxaca – Santa María del Tule | Horse | ? | ? | |
| | San Juan Chapultepec – San Pablo Etla | Horse | ? | ? | |
| | (San Juan Bautista) Tuxtepec – Sebastopol | Horse | ? | ? | |
| | (Santo Domingo) Tehuantepec | Horse | ? | ? | |

== Puebla ==
| Name of System | Location | Traction Type | Date (From) | Date (To) | Notes |
|---|---|---|---|---|---|
| | Acatzingo (de Hidalgo) – Huizcolotla – Annatempan | Steam | ? | ? | |
| | Amozoc – Tepeaco | Horse | ? | ? | |
| | Apapasco – Tlaloc | Horse | ? | ? | |
| | Atlixco | Horse | 1898 | ? | |
| | Atlixco | Petrol (gasoline) | ? | after 1944 | |
| | Atencingo – Tlancualpican | ? | ? | ? | |
| | Chachapa – Capulac | ? | ? | ? | |
| | Chietla | Horse | ? | ? | |
| | Ciudad Serdán – Chalchicomulas | Petrol (gasoline) | ? | ? | |
| | Ciudad Serdán – San Andrés – La Capilla | Horse | ? | ? | |
| | Esperanza – Xúchil | Horse | ? | ? | |
| | Galapaxco | Horse | ? | ? | see note. |
| | Izúcar (de Matamoros) | Horse | ? | ? | |
| Compañía de Tranvías, Luz y Fuerza de Puebla | Puebla | Horse | May 1881 | ? | |
| Compañía de Tranvías, Luz y Fuerza de Puebla | Puebla | Petrol (gasoline) | ? | 10 Oct 1926 | |
| Compañía de Tranvías, Luz y Fuerza de Puebla | ♦ Puebla – El Valor, Tlaxcala | Horse | ca. 1890 | ? | , see note. |
| Compañía de Tranvías, Luz y Fuerza de Puebla | ♦ Puebla – El Valor, Tlaxcala | Petrol (gasoline) | ? | Mar 1942 | , see note. |
| Compañía de Tranvías, Luz y Fuerza de Puebla | ♦ Puebla – Cholula (de Rivadavia) – Huexotzingo | Horse | ca. 1890 | ? | , see note. |
| Compañía de Tranvías, Luz y Fuerza de Puebla | ♦ Puebla – Cholula (de Rivadavia) – Huexotzingo | Petrol | ? | 1928 | , see note. |
| Compañía de Tranvías, Luz y Fuerza de Puebla | ♦ Puebla – Cholula (de Rivadavia) – Huexotzingo | Electric | 27 May 1924 | 31 Dec, 1941 | , see note. |
| | Tecamachalco | Horse | ? | ? | |
| | Tehuacán – El Riego | Horse | ? | ? | |
| | Tehuacán – El Riego | Petrol (gasoline) | ? | 1950 | |
| | San Martín Texmelucan de Labastida /Texmelucan – Tetla – Huexotzingo | Horse | ? | ? | |
| | Teziutlán | Horse | ? | ? | |

- Note for Galapaxco: Peschkes (Part One, 1980, Page 34) states that the location of this town is "unknown."
- Note for Puebla – El Valor: Opened in stages, completed 1897.
- Note for Puebla – Cholula – Huexotzingo: Opened in stages, completed 1897. Puebla – Cholula electrified 1924. Cholula – Huejotzingo not electrified.

== Querétaro ==
| Name of System | Location | Traction Type | Date (From) | Date (To) | Notes |
|---|---|---|---|---|---|
| | (San Sebastián) Bernal | Horse | ? | ? | |
| | (Santiago de) Querétaro | Horse | ? | ? | |
| | San Juan del Río | Horse | ? | ? | |
| | San Juan del Río | Petrol (gasoline) | ? | ? | |
| | ♦ San Juan del Río – Tequisquiapan | Horse | ? | ? | |

== San Luis Potosí ==
| Name of System | Location | Traction Type | Date (From) | Date (To) | Notes |
|---|---|---|---|---|---|
| | Ciudad Valles | Petrol (gasoline) | ? | ? | |
| | (San Juan de los) Cerritos | Mule | ? | ? | |
| | Guerrero | Mule | ? | ? | |
| | Guerrero | Steam | ? | ? | |
| | Matehuala | Mule | ? | ? | |
| | Mina Asarco | Mule | ? | ? | see note. |
| | Real de Catorce – Potrero | Mule | ? | ? | |
| | Real de Catorce – Potrero | Electric | 15 Sep 1908 | 3 Jun, 1933 | |
| | San Luis Potosí | Horse | 188_ | ? | |
| | San Luis Potosí | Electric | 16 Feb 1914 | 7 Apr, 1932 | |
| | ♦ Jesús María (Cerro de San Pedro) | Mule | ? | ? | |
| | ♦ Villa de Pozos | Mule | ? | ? | |
| | Santa María del Río | Mule | ? | ? | |
| | Tamasopo | Mule | ? | ? | |
| | Villa de Reyes | Mule | ? | ? | |

- Note for Mina Asarco: Peschkes (Part One, 1980, Page 30) states that the location of this town is "unknown." Mina is Spanish for "mine," and Asarco is believed to refer to ASARCO, Inc.

== Sinaloa ==
| Name of System | Location | Traction Type | Date (From) | Date (To) | Notes |
|---|---|---|---|---|---|
| | Altata | Horse | ? | ? | |
| | Culiacán | Horse | ? | ? | |
| | Guasave | Horse | ? | ? | |
| | Los Mochis | Horse | ? | ? | |
| | Mazatlán | Horse | ? | ? | |
| | Mazatlán | Steam | 1908 | 1913 | |

== Sonora ==
| Name of System | Location | Traction Type | Date (From) | Date (To) | Notes |
|---|---|---|---|---|---|
| | Cananea | Mule | 1902 | ? | |
| | Ciudad Obregón | Mule | ? | ? | |
| | Guaymas | Mule | 1888 | 1917 | |
| | Hermosillo | Mule | ? | ? | |
| | Huatabampo | Mule | ? | ? | |
| | Navojoa | Mule | ? | ? | |
| | Nogales | Mule | ? | ? | |
| | Nogales | Petrol (gasoline) | ? | ? | |

== Tabasco ==
| Name of System | Location | Traction Type | Date (From) | Date (To) | Notes |
|---|---|---|---|---|---|
| | Cárdenas | Mule | ? | ? | |
| | Frontera | Mule | ? | ? | |
| | Jalapa | Mule | ? | ? | |
| | Tamulté (de las Sábanas) | Mule | ? | ? | |
| | Villahermosa | Mule | ? | ? | |
| | Villahermosa | Petrol (gasoline) | ? | ? | |

== Tamaulipas ==
| Name of System | Location | Traction Type | Date (From) | Date (To) | Notes |
|---|---|---|---|---|---|
| | Ciudad Victoria | Horse | ? | ? | |
| | Ciudad Victoria | Petrol (gasoline) | ? | ? | |
| | Ciudad Mante | Horse | ? | ? | |
| | Ciudad Mante | Petrol (gasoline) | ? | ? | |
| | Matamoro | Horse | ? | ? | |
| | Matamoro | Petrol (gasoline) | ? | ? | |
| | Nuevo Laredo | Horse | 19 Nov 1886 | ? | |
| | Nuevo Laredo | Electric | 12 Mar 1890 | ? | International tramway, from Laredo, Texas US |
| | Reynosa | Horse | ? | ? | |
| | Santa Engracia | Horse | ? | ? | |
| | Tampico | Horse | 1879 1 Jan 1901 | ? ? | |
| | Tampico | Electric | May (?) 1914 | 31 Mar 1927 | |
| Sociedad Cooperativa de Transportes Eléctricos de Tampico y Miramar | ♦ Tampico – Miramar (Ciudad Madero) | Electric | 30 Aug 1914 | 13 Dec, 1974 | |

== Tlaxcala ==
| Name of System | Location | Traction Type | Date (From) | Date (To) | Notes |
|---|---|---|---|---|---|
| | Analco – Reyes | Horse | ? | ? | |
| | Apizacl – Tlaxco (de Morelos) | Horse | ? | ? | |
| | Guadalupe | Horse | ? | ? | |
| | Huamantla | Horse | ? | ? | |
| | Nanacamilpa – Ixtajiaguca | Horse | ? | ? | |
| | Tlaxcala | Petrol (gasoline) | ? | ? | |
| | Zoltepec | Petrol (gasoline) | ? | ? | |

== Veracruz (de Ignacio de la Llave) ==
| Name of System | Location | Traction Type | Date (From) | Date (To) | Notes |
|---|---|---|---|---|---|
| | Alamo | Horse | ? | ? | |
| | Alvarado | Horse | ? | ? | |
| | Coatepec | Horse | ? | ? | |
| | Coatzacoalcos | Horse | ? | ? | |
| | Córdoba | Horse | ? | ? | |
| | Córdoba | Steam | ? | ? | |
| | Córdoba | Petrol (gasoline) | ? | ? | |
| | El Humo (Pánuco) – El Higo | Petrol (gasoline) | ? | ? | |
| | La Gloria – Cardel | Horse | ? | ? | |
| | (San Pedro de) Los Naranjos – Cuchillos | Horse | ? | ? | |
| | Nanchital – El Chapo | Horse | ? | ? | |
| | Orizaba | Horse | 1878 | ? | |
| | Orizaba | Petrol (gasoline) | 192_ | 1933 | |
| | Paso del Macho | Horse | ? | ? | |
| | San Jeronimo – Cerro Azul | Steam | ? | ? | |
| | San Juan Evangelista – Juilo | Horse | ? | ? | |
| | Soledad (de Doblado) | Horse | ? | ? | |
| | Tecolutla – Palo Hueco | Horse | ? | ? | |
| | Tierra Blanca | Horse | ? | ? | |
| | Tlacotalpan | Horse | ? | ? | |
| | Túxpam de Rodríguez Cano /Túxpan | Horse | ? | ? | |
| | Túxpam de Rodríguez Cano /Túxpan | Horse | ? | ? | |
| | (San Andrés) Tuxtla | Horse | ? | ? | |
| Sociedad Cooperativa de Transportes Urbanos y Sub-Urbanos de Veracruz S.A. de C.V. | Veracruz | Horse | 1864 | 1939 | |
| Sociedad Cooperativa de Transportes Urbanos y Sub-Urbanos de Veracruz S.A. de C.V. | Veracruz | Electric | 5 Jul 1908 | 16 Aug, 1981 | |
| | ♦ Veracruz – Tejería | Horse | ? | ? | |
| | ♦ Veracruz – Tejería | Petrol (gasoline) | ? | ? | |
| | ♦ Veracruz – Xalapa (de Enríquez) /Jalapa | Mule | 1875 | 1893 | Ranked as world's longest horse tramway line. |
| | Xalapa (de Enríquez) /Jalapa | Horse | 1875 | ? | |
| | Xalapa (de Enríquez) /Jalapa | Steam | 1898 | 1926 | |
| | Xalapa (de Enríquez) /Jalapa | Accumulator (storage battery) | ? | ? | |
| | Xalapa (de Enríquez) /Jalapa | Petrol (gasoline) | 1926 | 1935 | |

== Yucatán ==
| Name of System | Location | Traction Type | Date (From) | Date (To) | Notes |
|---|---|---|---|---|---|
| | Espita | Horse | ? | ? | |
| | Mérida | Horse | 15 Dec 1880 | | |
| | Mérida | Steam | 189_ | ? | |
| | Mérida | Accumulator (storage battery) | 1918 | ? | |
| | Mérida | Petrol (gasoline) | 1919 | 1930 | |
| | Peto | Horse | ? | ? | |
| | Progreso | Horse | 189_ | ? | |
| | Progreso | Petrol (gasoline) | ? | 193_ | |
| | Sisal | Horse | ? | ? | |
| | Tekax (de Álvaro Obregón) | Horse | ? | ? | |
| | Tizimín | Horse | ? | ? | |
| | Tzucacab | Horse | ? | ? | |
| | Valladolid | Horse | ? | ? | |

- Note for Yucatán: In addition to urban tramways, "central Yucatán" (i.e. the northeastern part of Yucatán state) had more than 1,500 km (950 mi) of intercity tramways, all worked by horses or mules. At least seven such lines extended from Mérida. In addition, Yucatán also had approximately 3,000 km (1,900 mi) of hacienda tramways. These were built to transport henequen crops from plantation fields to railway stations. Some henequen plantations closed because of the Great Depression, and the hacienda tramways were handed to railway companies or other enterprises. Many hacienda tramways were eventually abandoned but tracks remained in use by local residents. A few hacienda tramways continued in operation after 2000.

== Zacatecas ==
| Name of System | Location | Traction Type | Date (From) | Date (To) | Notes |
|---|---|---|---|---|---|
| | Concepción del Oro (El Oro) | Horse | ? | ? | |
| | Fresnillo | Horse | ? | ? | |
| | Jerez | Horse | ? | ? | |
| | Sombrerete | Horse | ? | ? | |
| | Sombrerete | Petrol (gasoline) | ? | ? | |
| | Zacatecas | Horse | ? | ? | |
| | ♦ Zacatecas – Ojocaliente | Horse | ? | ? | |
