= Motor Bus Society =

The Motor Bus Society (MBS) is a United States–based non-profit organization formed by a voluntary association of persons who share an interest in buses and bus transportation in North America and, in particular, the history of the same. Founded in 1948, it publishes the quarterly magazine, Motor Coach Age, and holds a national convention semi-annually for its members. MBS is based in New Jersey. It previously maintained a small, private library and historical archive for use by its members and, by appointment only, the general public, in central New Jersey, but it had closed by 2006.

== History ==
Originally organized in 1948 as the National Motor Bus Association and later changing its name to the Motor Bus Society, Inc., the group's membership includes people working in the bus industry as well as bus enthusiasts, and some members fit both descriptions. Its newsletter soon developed into a regular magazine (see below). Every year since the early 1950s the association has held national membership conventions, in different cities across the United States and Canada. There are normally two conventions each year, in spring and fall, one held in the eastern U.S. (or eastern Canada) and the other in the western U.S. (or Canada). As of 2000, MBS had about 1,200 members. It is incorporated in New Jersey as a type-501(c)(3) tax-exempt, non-profit organization.

== Magazines ==
The Motor Bus Society's magazine, Motor Coach Age (MCA) (ISSN 0739-117X), has been published since 1950. For one or two years prior to that, MBS circulated a simple mimeographed newsletter named Bus Ways, but this was replaced in January 1950 by Motor Coach Age, which included photographs. MCA was changed to a professional format in 1952, with 12- to 16-page issues. During a period of debate among members as to the society's direction, publication of the magazine became sporadic in the late 1950s, but became regular again in 1967, when a new editor, Albert E. Meier, took over that position. Issues thereafter were published monthly and were each 24 pages long. During the 1980s MCA publication was variably monthly or bimonthly, then bimonthly in the early 1990s. Since the beginning of 1995, the magazine has been a quarterly publication. Mac Sebree was the magazine's editor from 1995 through 2003. Issue size varies between 24 and 56 pages, depending on the subject.

At least since 1967, the content of Motor Coach Age has always been focused on history, documenting in detail the histories of, for example, bus transportation in particular cities or particular operating companies, or the history of a specific bus manufacturer. Included whenever applicable are histories of electric trolley bus operation and trolley bus manufacturing.

From July 1994 until the end of 2003, MBS also published Motor Coach Today (MCT), a quarterly magazine focusing on present-day operations rather than history.

== See also ==
- Motor bus
- Public transport bus service
- The Motor Bus, a poem by A. D. Godley
