= List of town tramway systems in the Netherlands =

This is a list of town tramway systems in the Netherlands by province. It includes all tram systems, past and present; cities with currently operating systems, and those systems themselves, are indicated in bold and blue background colored rows. The use of the diamond (♦) symbol indicates where there were (or are) two or more independent tram systems operating concurrently within a single metropolitan area. Those tram systems that operated on other than standard gauge track (where known) are indicated in the 'Notes' column.

== Gelderland ==
| Name of System & Operator | Location | Traction Type | Date (From) | Date (To) | Notes |
|---|---|---|---|---|---|
| ATM (1897–1917); GTA (1919–1922) | Apeldoorn | Horse | 12 August 1897 | 11 November 1917 | Apeldoornsche Tramweg-Maatschappij |
| ATM (1897–1917); GTA (1919–1922) | Apeldoorn | Petrol (gasoline) | 5 June 1919 | 8 October 1922 | Gemeentetram Apeldoorn |
| ATM (1880–1911); GETA (1911–1944) | Arnhem | Horse | 3 May 1880 | 12 June 1912 | Arnhemsche Tramweg-Maatschappij |
| ATM (1880–1911); GETA (1911–1944) | Arnhem | Electric | 21 May 1911 | 17 September 1944 | Gemeente Electrische Tram Arnhem; Because of World War II (operation Market-Garden) closed – replaced by trolleybus. **Heritage tramway** opened in the Netherlands Open Air Museum, 1996. |
| HSM (1883–1910); GT (1915–1922) | Groenlo | Steam | 29 May 1883 | 31 December 1910 | Hollandshe IJzeren Spoorweg-Maatschappij |
| HSM (1883–1910); GT (1915–1922) | Groenlo | Petrol (gasoline) | 6 August 1915 | Oct 1922 | Groenlosche Tram |
| HSM (1883–1910); GT (1915–1922) | Groenlo | Horse | 1917 | 1919 | Temporary use of horses because of lack of petrol |
| NTM (1889–1912); M&W (1912–1921); GTN (1911–1955) | Nijmegen | Horse | 1889 | 1911 | Nijmeegsche Tramweg-Maatschappij |
| NTM (1889–1912); M&W (1912–1921); GTN (1911–1955) | Nijmegen | Steam | 30 June 1889 | 31 December 1921 | Stoomtram Maas en Waal |
| NTM (1889–1912); M&W (1912–1921); GTN (1911–1955) | Nijmegen | Electric | 4 June 1911 | 20 November 1955 | Gemeentetram Nijmegen; Replaced by trolleybus |
| GTZ | Zaltbommel | Horse | 14 March 1910 | 31 August 1923 | Gemeentetram Zaltbommel |
| ZTM | Zutphen | Horse | 16 May 1889 | 29 January 1904 | Zutphensche Tramweg-Maatschappij |

== Groningen ==
| Name of System & Operator | Location | Traction Type | Date (From) | Date (To) | Notes |
|---|---|---|---|---|---|
| TGP (1880–1906); GPE (1896–1929); GTG (1906–1949) | Groningen | Horse | 13 July 1880 | 27 April 1910 | Tramways de Groningen et de la Province |
| TGP (1880–1906); GPE (1896–1929); GTG (1906–1949) | Groningen | Petrol (gasoline) | 27 June 1921 | 30 June 1929 | Tramweg-Maatschappij Groningen – Paterswolde – Eelde |
| TGP (1880–1906); GPE (1896–1929); GTG (1906–1949) | Groningen | Electric | 1 March 1910 | 12 December 1949 | Gemeente Tram Groningen; **Reintroduction planned** as part of the Kolibri-plan to improve public transport in region and city. |

== Limburg ==
| Name of System & Operator | Location | Traction Type | Date (From) | Date (To) | Notes |
|---|---|---|---|---|---|
| LTM | Heerlen | Steam | ? | ? | Limburgsche Tramweg-Mij |
| LTM | Heerlen | Electric | 1923 | 14 May 1950 | |
| LTM | ♦ Heerlen – Hoensbroek | Steam | ? | 1923 | |
| LTM | ♦ Heerlen – Hoensbroek | Electric | 1923 | ? | |
| LTM | ♦ Hoensbroek – Sittard | Electric | 1923 | ? | |
| LTM | ♦♦ branch to Brunssum | Electric | 24 March 1924 | ? | |
| LTM | ♦ Heerlen – Kerkrade Holz (German frontier) | Electric | 18 August 1926 | ? | |
| LTM | ♦ branch Valkenhuizen – Locht (German frontier) | Electric | 15 May 1928 | ? | |
| MT | Maastricht | Gas | 22 April 1896 | 15 October 1902 | Maastrichtsche Tram |
| MT | Maastricht | Horse | 7 June 1903 | 14 August 1914 | Closed for World War I (military barricade of the bridge across the Maas) |
| | Venlo – Steyl | Horse | ? | ? | |
| | Venlo – Steyl | Petrol (gasoline) | ? | ? | |
| GTV | Venray | Horse | 15 June 1909 | 30 June 1926 | Gemeentetram Venray |

== North Brabant ==
| Name of System & Operator | Location | Traction Type | Date (From) | Date (To) | Notes |
|---|---|---|---|---|---|
| GTM (1884–1919); BM (1901–1919); GTB (1920–1925) | Breda | Horse | 25 March 1884 | 30 September 1925 | Ginnekensche Tramweg-Maatschappij; Tramweg-Maatschappij Breda – Mastbosch; Gemeentetram Breda |
| 'sBH | 's-Hertogenbosch | Horse | 24 November 1881 | 8 October 1918 | Stoomtramweg-Maatschappij 's-Bosch – Helmond |

== North Holland ==
| Name of System & Operator | Location | Traction Type | Date (From) | Date (To) | Notes |
|---|---|---|---|---|---|
| AT (1895–1923); AST (1923–1929) | Alkmaar | Horse | Jan 1895 | 10 July 1923 | Alkmaarsche Tramvereeniging |
| AT (1895–1923); AST (1923–1929) | Alkmaar | Petrol (gasoline) | 15 July 1923 | 22 June 1929 | Alkmaarsche Stadstram |
| Trams in Amsterdam; GVBA | **Amsterdam** | Horse | 3 June 1875 | 7 August 1916 | Amsterdamse Omnibus Maatschappij |
| Trams in Amsterdam; GVBA | **Amsterdam** | Electric | 14 August 1900 | | |
| NZH | ♦ Amsterdam – Edam – Volendam | Steam | 13 December 1888 | ? | N-Z Hollandsche stoomTramweg-Mij: Blauwe Tram |
| NZH | ♦ Amsterdam – Edam – Volendam | Electric | ? | 30 September 1956 | Edam – Volendam from: 1 December 1932. |
| NZH | ♦♦ branch to Purmerend | Steam | 22 June 1894 | ? | |
| NZH | ♦♦ branch to Purmerend | Electric | ? | 14 May 1949 | |
| NZH | ♦ Amsterdam – Haarlem – Zandvoort | Electric | 3 July 1899 | 31 August 1957 | The first Electric overhead tramway in the Netherlands. |
| LBB | Bergen | Horse | 4 August 1907 | 24 June 1909 | Lorriedienst Bergen aan Zee – Bergen Binnen |
| HSM (1882–1892); EPU (1892–1924) | Beverwijk – Wijk aan Zee | Steam | 25 May 1882 | 30 April 1892 | Until 1 May 1898 Summer only |
| HSM (1882–1892); EPU (1892–1924) | Beverwijk – Wijk aan Zee | Horse | 1 May 1892 | 7 June 1924 | Buffet-Maatschappij "E Pluribus Unum" |
| D&B | Castricum | Horse | 30 January 1914 | 1920 | Provinciaal Ziekenhuis "Duin en Bosch" |
| D&B | Castricum | Electric | 1920 | Jun 1938 | Hospital line nl:Provinciaal ziekenhuis (Noord-Holland) |
| HH | Den Helder | Steam | 7 July 1896 | 19 August 1917 | Tram Helder – Huisduinen; Summer only, no service in 1908/9 |
| | Haarlem | Horse | 28 May 1878 | 1911 | |
| | Haarlem | Electric | 1911 | 31 October 1948 | |
| GTM | Hilversum | Horse | 15 May 1887 | 30 September 1923 | 's-Gravelandse Tramweg-Maatschappij |
| ETMZ (1882); TMZ (1884–1889); EPU (1894–1907) | Zandvoort | Electric | 9 June 1882 | 30 September 1882 | This line was owned by Siemens & Halske and technical equal to the Gross-Lichterfelde Tramway |
| ETMZ (1882); TMZ (1884–1889); EPU (1894–1907) | Zandvoort | Horse | 4 July 1884; 10 June 1894 | 22 September 1889; 31 August 1907 | (Electrische) Tramweg-Maatschappij Zandvoort |

== Overijssel ==
| Name of System & Operator | Location | Traction Type | Date (From) | Date (To) | Notes |
|---|---|---|---|---|---|
| GOSM | Deventer | Horse | 14 February 1887 | 30 April 1894 | Geldersch-Overijsselsche Stoomtram-Maatschappij |
| TET | Enschede | Electric | 5 July 1908 | 28 February 1933 | Twentsche Electrische Tramweg-Maatschappij |
| ZTM | Zwolle | Horse | 17 July 1885 | 7 August 1919 | Zwolsche Tramweg-Maatschappij |

== South Holland ==
| Name of System & Operator | Location | Traction Type | Date (From) | Date (To) | Notes |
|---|---|---|---|---|---|
| TD (1879–1891); RTM (1891–1919) | Dordrecht | Horse | 23 November 1879 | 15 March 1919 | |
| LTM (Leidsche Tramway-Maatschappij 1879–1882); TTC (1882–1886); RTM (1886–1909); NZH (1909–1960) | Leiden | Horse | 22 November 1879 | 1911 | |
| LTM (Leidsche Tramway-Maatschappij 1879–1882); TTC (1882–1886); RTM (1886–1909); NZH (1909–1960) | Leiden | Electric | 1 September 1911 | 7 October 1960 | |
| NZH | ♦ Leiden – Haarlem | Steam | 16 May 1881 | ? | |
| NZH | ♦ Leiden – Haarlem | Electric | ? | 2 January 1949 | N-Z Holland Tram = " Blue Tram " |
| NZH | ♦ Leiden – Noordwijk aan Zee | Steam traction | 21 June 1885 | 7 October 1960 | |
| NZH | Katwijk | Steam | 4 June 1881 | 7 October 1960 | Started as RSTM between Katwijk aan Zee and Rijnsburg, later expanded by NZHTM to Leiden ("blue tram"). A narrow gauge heritage steam tram service is operational since 1973 by SVM |
| GTO | Oudewater | Horse | 7 August 1906 | ? | |
| GTO | Oudewater | Petrol (gasoline) | 1924 | March 1931 | In 1970 Oudewater went from South Holland (Zuid-Holland) to Utrecht |
| Trams in Rotterdam; RTM (1886-1968); RETM (1904–1927); RET (since 1927) | **Rotterdam** | Horse | 1 June 1879 | 18 May 1925 | |
| Trams in Rotterdam; RTM (1886-1968); RETM (1904–1927); RET (since 1927) | **Rotterdam** | Steam | 9 April 1881 | 16 December 1924 | |
| Trams in Rotterdam; RTM (1886-1968); RETM (1904–1927); RET (since 1927) | **Rotterdam** | Petrol (gasoline) | 19 May 1924 | 25 October 1968 | |
| Trams in Rotterdam; RTM (1886-1968); RETM (1904–1927); RET (since 1927) | **Rotterdam** | Electric | 18 September 1905 | | See also: RandstadRail. |
| STM (Schiedamse Tramweg Maatschappij) | Schiedam | Horse | 19 September 1902 | Jan 1918 | |
| Trams in The Hague; HTM | **The Hague** = ♦ **Den Haag – Scheveningen** | Horse | 25 June 1864 | 1907 | |
| Trams in The Hague; HTM | **The Hague** = ♦ **Den Haag – Scheveningen** | Steam | 1 July 1879 | 1924 | |
| Trams in The Hague; HTM | **The Hague** = ♦ **Den Haag – Scheveningen** | Accumulator with Lead-acid battery | 2 August 1890 | 1904 | One of the first electric vehicles in the world |
| Trams in The Hague; HTM | **The Hague** = ♦ **Den Haag – Scheveningen** | Electric | 6 August 1904 | | First segment "Semimetro": RandstadRail opened in 2006 |
| Trams in The Hague; HTM | ♦ **Den Haag – Delft** | Horse | 24 June 1866 | 1887 | |
| Trams in The Hague; HTM | ♦ **Den Haag – Delft** | Steam | 1887 | 1924 | |
| Trams in The Hague; HTM | ♦ **Den Haag – Delft** | Electric | 1924 | | **branch to Voorburg**, opened 1934. |
| NZH | ♦ Den Haag – Voorburg – Leiden | Steam | 1881 | 1924 | |
| NZH | ♦ Den Haag – Voorburg – Leiden | Electric | 25 January 1924 | 9 November 1961 | Blue Tram (Blauwe Tram) |
| HTM | ♦ Den Haag – Wassenaar – Leiden | Electric | 3 June 1923 | 9 November 1961 | Yellow Tram (Gele Tram) |

== Utrecht ==
| Name of System & Operator | Location | Traction Type | Date (From) | Date (To) | Notes |
|---|---|---|---|---|---|
| ATM | Amersfoort | Horse | 1 August 1901 | 13 January 1917 | Amersfoortsche Tramweg-Maatschappij |
| SP (1895–1918); GTS (1918–1923) | Soest – Baarn | Horse | 1 June 1895 | 30 September 1922 | Soester Paardentramweg |
| SP (1895–1918); GTS (1918–1923) | Soest – Baarn | Petrol (gasoline) | 1 October 1922 | 18 May 1924 | Gemeente-Trambedrijf Soest |
| UTM | Utrecht | Horse | 3 July 1889 | 14 September 1907 | Utrechtsche-Tram-Maatschappij |
| GTU | Utrecht | Electric | 20 June 1906 | 15 January 1939 | Gemeentetram Utrecht |
| NBM | ♦ Utrecht – De Bilt – Zeist | Horse | 29 April 1879 | 1909(?) | Initial segment opened 1879 did not extend to Zeist. |
| NBM | ♦ Utrecht – De Bilt – Zeist | Electric | 1909 | 2 May 1949 | Nederlandsche Buurtspoorweg-Maatschappij (NBM) |
| NBM | ♦ Amersfoort – Zeist – Driebergen – Rhenen – Arnhem | Horse | 1882 | ? | Zeist – Driebergen. |
| NBM | ♦ Amersfoort – Zeist – Driebergen – Rhenen – Arnhem | Steam | 1883 | 1931 | (Zeist -) Driebergen – Doorn – Amerongen. Extended Elst – Rhenen – Wageningen – Oosterbeek – Arnhem in 1884 – 1887. Zeist – Huis ter Heide – Amersfoort opened 1910. Branch, Doorn – Wijk bij Duurstede, opened 1885, closed 1931, not electrified. |
| NBM | ♦ Amersfoort – Zeist – Driebergen – Rhenen – Arnhem | Petrol (gasoline) | 1910 | 1931 (?) | |
| NBM | ♦ Amersfoort – Zeist – Driebergen – Rhenen – Arnhem | Electric | 1911 | 2 May 1949 | Zeist – Driebergen electrified 1911. Rhenen – Arnhem electrified 1922. Remainder of Amersfoort – Zeist – Rhenen – Arnhem electrified 1924. Rhenen – Arnhem closed 1937. Remainder closed 1949, last segment in operation was Amersfoort – Zeist – Doorn. |
| Utrechtse sneltram | ♦ **Utrecht – Nieuwegein – IJsselstein** | Electric | 17 Dec 1983 | | Operated by Qbuzz since 2011. |
| | Utrecht – Vreeswijk | Steam | 1882 | ? | |
| | Utrecht – Vreeswijk | Horse | 1893 | 1929 | |
| | Utrecht – Vreeswijk | Petrol (gasoline) | 1923 | 1929 | |

== Zeeland ==
| Name of System & Operator | Location | Traction Type | Date (From) | Date (To) | Notes |
|---|---|---|---|---|---|
| | Vlissingen – Middelburg | Steam | 1885 | 1910 | |
| | Vlissingen – Middelburg | Electric | 1910 | 1944 | |

== See also ==
- List of town tramway systems in Europe
- List of tram and light rail transit systems
- List of metro systems
- List of trolleybus systems
