= Trams in Novi Sad =

Novi Sad tram
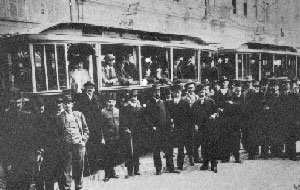

Overview
- Locale: Novi Sad
- Transit type: Tram
- Number of lines: 2

Operation
- Began operation: 30 September 1911
- Ended operation: 1958

The Novi Sad tram system was a tram system in Novi Sad, Serbia. It was in operation between 30 September 1911 until some time in 1958.

There are plans to build a new network with estimated completion by 2030.

== Origins and Demise ==
As Novi Sad developed, the need for mass transit grew. In 1868 the first plans for transporting people in chariots was presented. As the time went on and the city grew in size, the idea of building a tram based public transport system began to take form. Local electric power plant started delivering electricity in 1910. This was one of the requirements for the development of the electric tram. The first trams started to run the following year. Initially there were 19 tram cars in the system, most of which were produced by the Ganz factory in Budapest. A couple of the cars were made in Germany. Later on, three more cars from the city of Slavonski Brod were obtained. The track was 1,435 mm (4 ft 8 1/2 in) standard gauge.

The city continued expanding as it became the center of the Danube Banovina. In 1930 the city bought three buses, which started competing for the passengers with the tram system. The bombing of a power-plant during the World War II, in 1944, knocked the tram service out of operation. The tram service was reinstated on 25 May 1945.

The trams continued to run until 1958, when they were replaced by buses. Gradually, the tracks and power distribution installation were dismantled and removed.

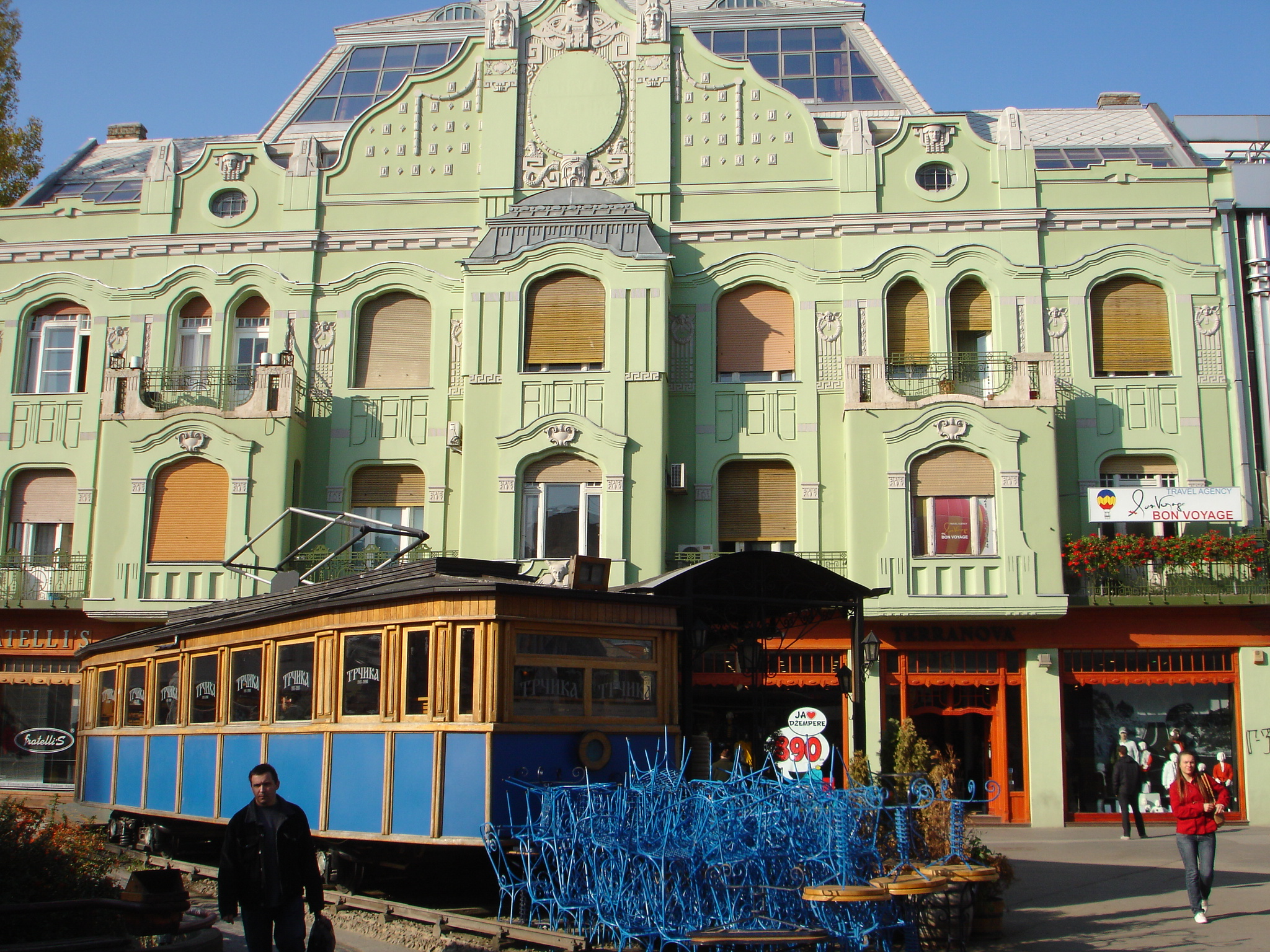
Trčika retro tram cafe

A historical tram of series 50 - 52 has been preserved and is numbered as 13 now. Retro cafe Trčika at the corner of Kralja Aleksandra Street and Mihajla Pupina Bulevard near Menratova Palata house looks little bit like an old tram, but except for the bogies, nothing comes from a rail vehicle.

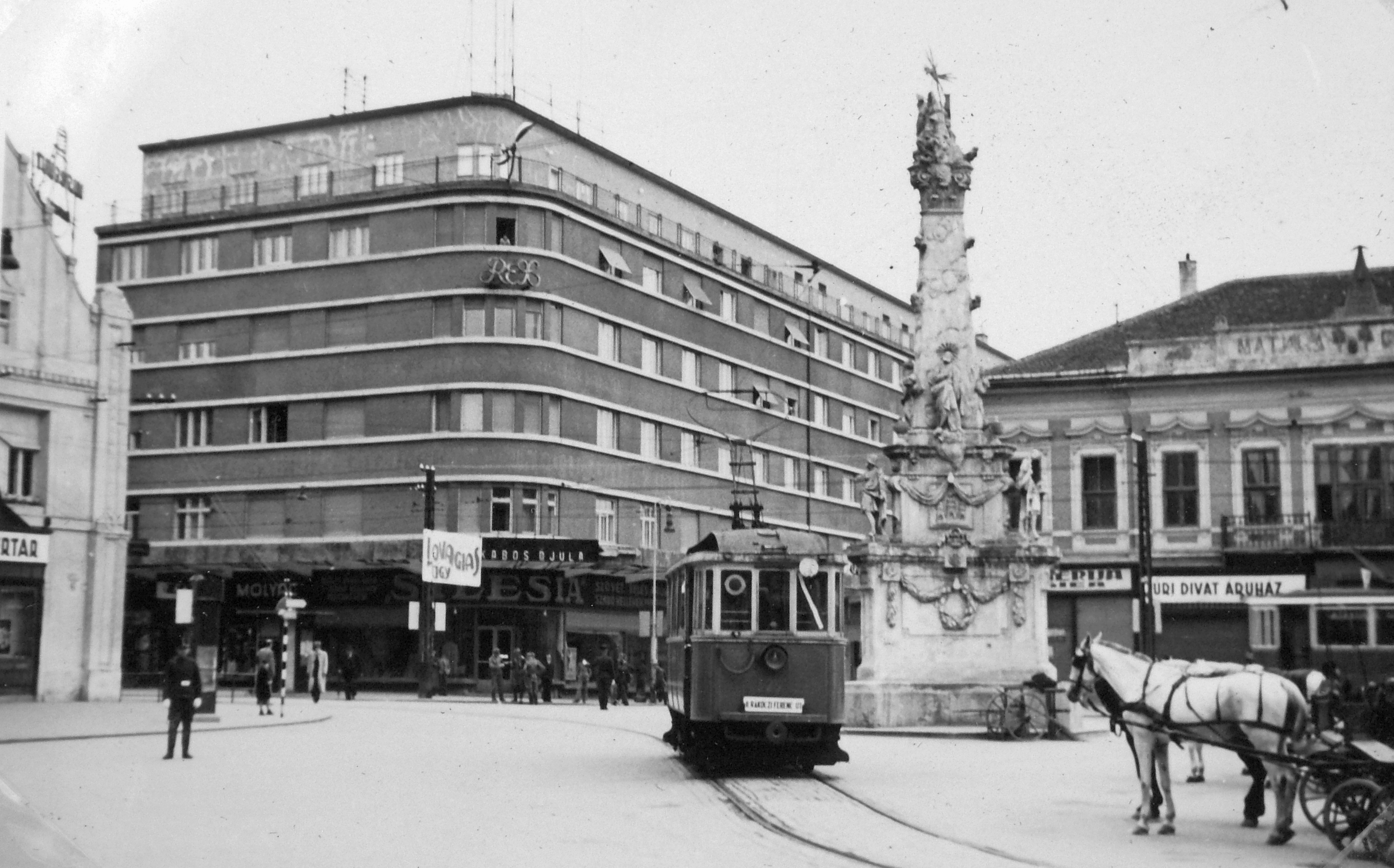
Tram near Liberation (now Freedom) Square in 1942

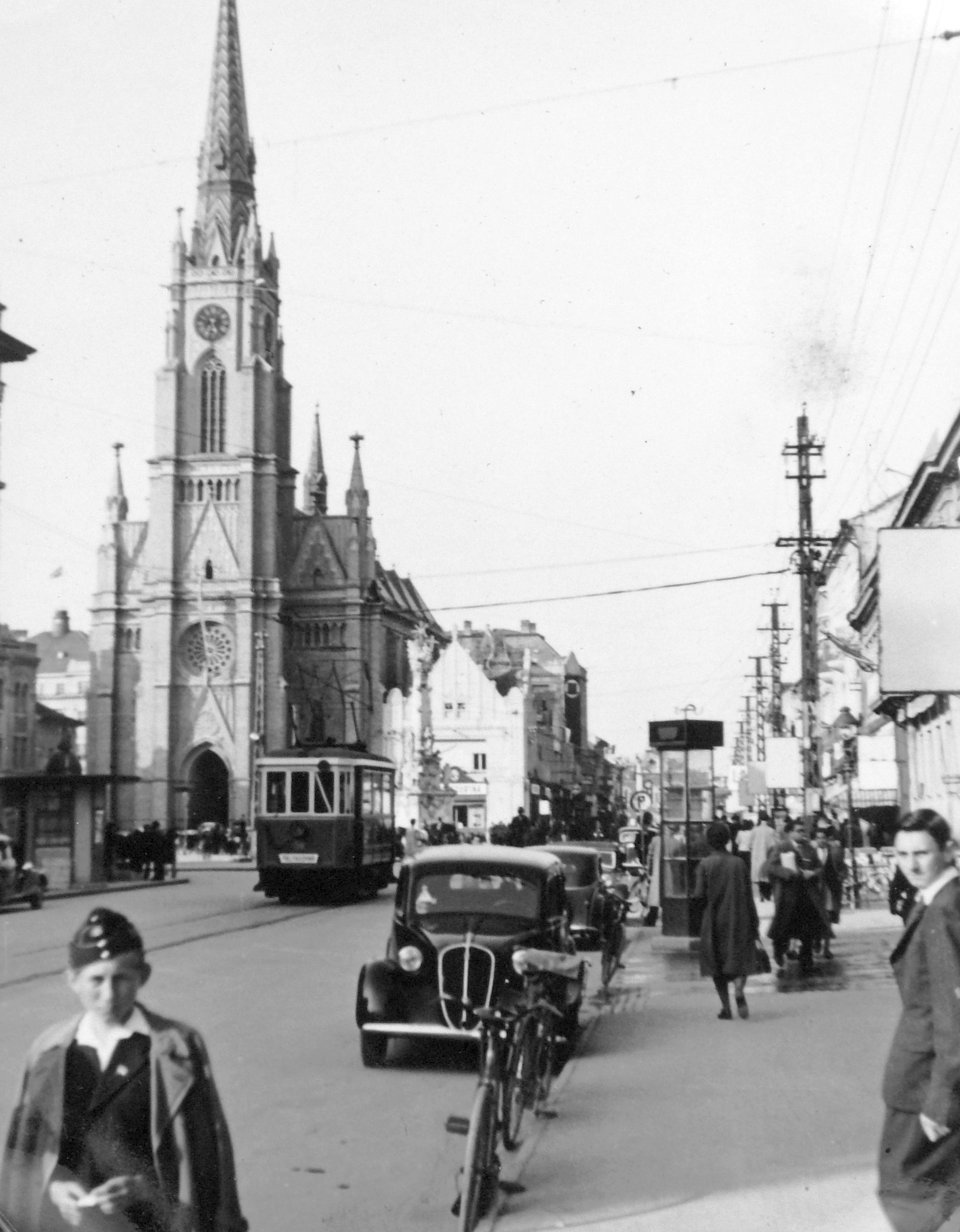
Tram near Liberation (now Freedom) Square in 1942

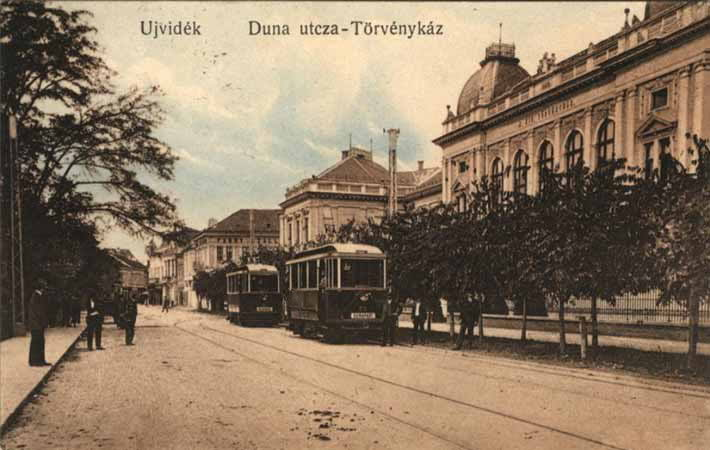
Tram near Museum of Vojvodina in 1900

== Lines ==
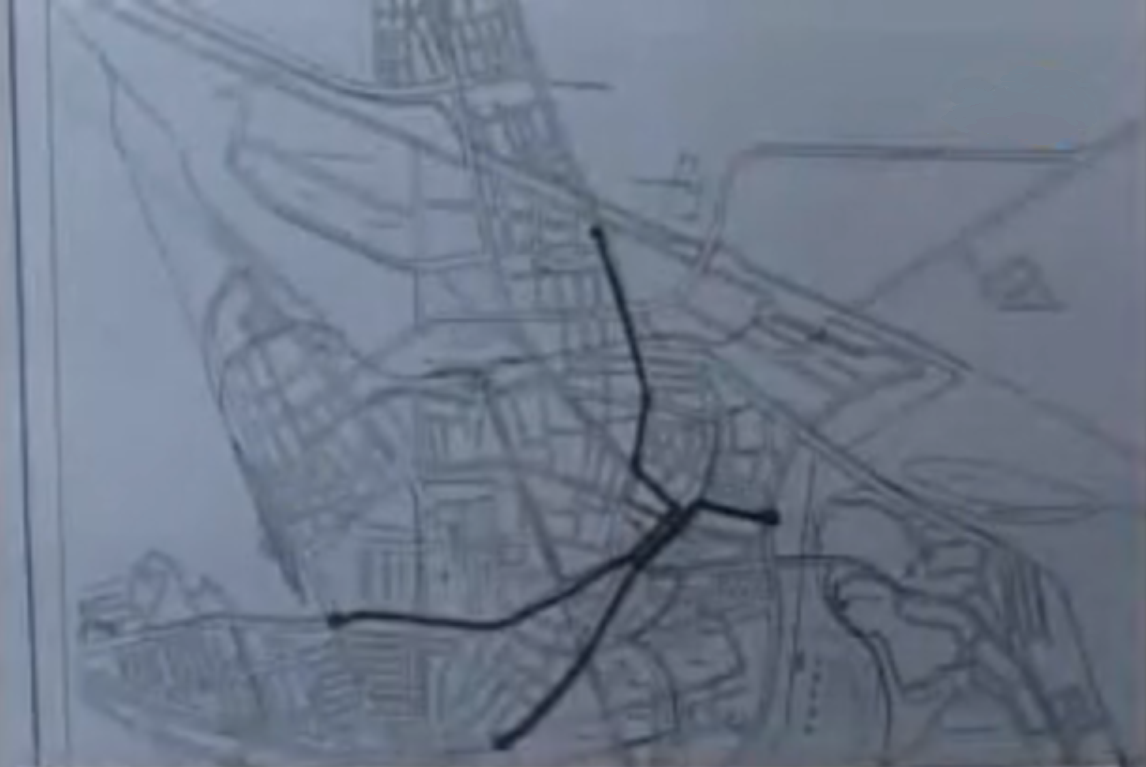
Map of former system.

There were two lines in the system.

- Line One, the White Line, ran from the Futoška Kapija (Gate) to the Temerin Street. This route ran through the Temerin Street, passing by the Vladičanski Dvor, through the city center, towards the Jodna banja to the city hospital where was its terminus. This area was the boundary of the urbanised part of the city at the time. An additional line, the Blue Line, ran along this route. It ran from Kupatila to Čenej.
- Line Two, the Green Line, ran from the former location of the railway station (now a local green market, Limanska pijaca) to the end of the Dunavska Street, which is in the vicinity of the bank of the river Danube.

== Reintroduction ==
Map of the five lines as planned for 2030.

In 2011, Novi Sad municipality unveiled plans to reintroduce a tram network. The idea first appeared in 1991. According to the feasibility study conducted in 2011, the network should be made of 5 lines, overlapping each other. The lines would total 92.5 km of length, with 47 stations and one depot.

The first phase was estimated to cost €80 million. This would include the procurement of 25 trams (€65 million) and the construction of 25.5 km of track (€15 million). Phase one of the construction should stretch from terminal "Zapad" (West) to terminal "Liman IV", passing by the city centre. The other three phases should follow, and the network was planned to be completed by 2030. At that time, Novi Sad should have a fleet of some 50 trams, with a minimum capacity of 160 seats each.

By the General Urban Plan of Novi Sad for 2030, there are plans to reintroduce a tram line through Jovan Dučić and Knez Miloš Boulevards in Bistrica neighborhood.
