= Trams in Shenyang =

Shenyang Tramway Network
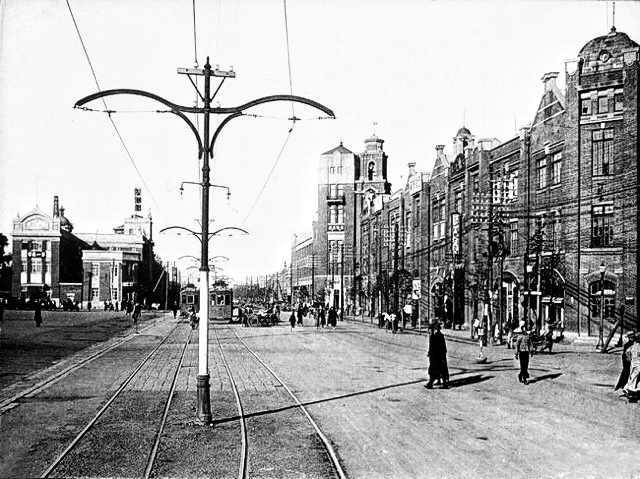
- Shenyang Trams in the 1930s

Operation
- Locale: Shenyang, People's Republic of China
- Open: 15 August 2013
- Lines: 3
- Owner: RATPDev

Infrastructure
- Track gauge: 1,435 mm (4 ft 8 1/2 in) standard gauge
- Depot: 2

Statistics
Horse Tram era
- Track gauge: 1,435 mm (4 ft 8 1/2 in) standard gauge
Japanese-Owned era: 1925–1973
- Track gauge: 1,435 mm (4 ft 8 1/2 in) standard gauge
Current era: 2013
- Track gauge: 1,435 mm (4 ft 8 1/2 in) standard gauge
- Track length (double): 70 km
- Stops: 65

Shenyang, a major industrial city on the Hun River in northeast China has returned its tramway as a modern tram system. Shenyang once had a standard steel wheeled tramway network. Unlike other Chinese towns & cities, Shenyang's tram system was not opened directly as an electric tram. The tram service was completely stopped in 1973. On 15 August, 2013 Shenyang opened a modern tram system in Hunnan New District south of central Shenyang.

== History ==
A horse tramway was opened at Shenyang in 1907. The Japanese - who operated the railways - started electrification in March 1924 even before the creation of the Manchukuo puppet state, and finally the electric tramway opened in October 1925 from Huaiyangmen via Taiqinggong to Xiaoxibianmen. In November 1925, the section between Xiaoxibianmen to Xita started operating. In 1926 Sino-Japanese joint venture opened a tramway, starting at Mukden Railway Station to Xiaoxibianmen. From 1920s to 1945 a total of six tram routes was put into operation in Shenyang.

The Chinese Civil War and Second Sino-Japanese War had great impact to tramway operations with power shortages and bombing causing the tram service to be suspended numerous times. By December 12, 1948, all six routes were fully rebuilt. After the establishment of the People's Republic of China, Shenyang had 170 tramcars, making it the largest in the country. The number of private cars greatly increased leading to major traffic congestion and delays to tram services. With the emergence of the first trolleybus line in Shenyang, the development of the tram gradually gave way to the trolleybus. On August 1, 1974, the last tram lines from Shenyang Railway Station to Taiqinggong were removed.

=== History ===
- 1925 - Electric tram started running from 15 March.
- 1945 - Total six routes opened as a maximum extension of the network.
- 1974- The last tram ran.
- 2013 - Tram returned as modern system.

== Fleet ==
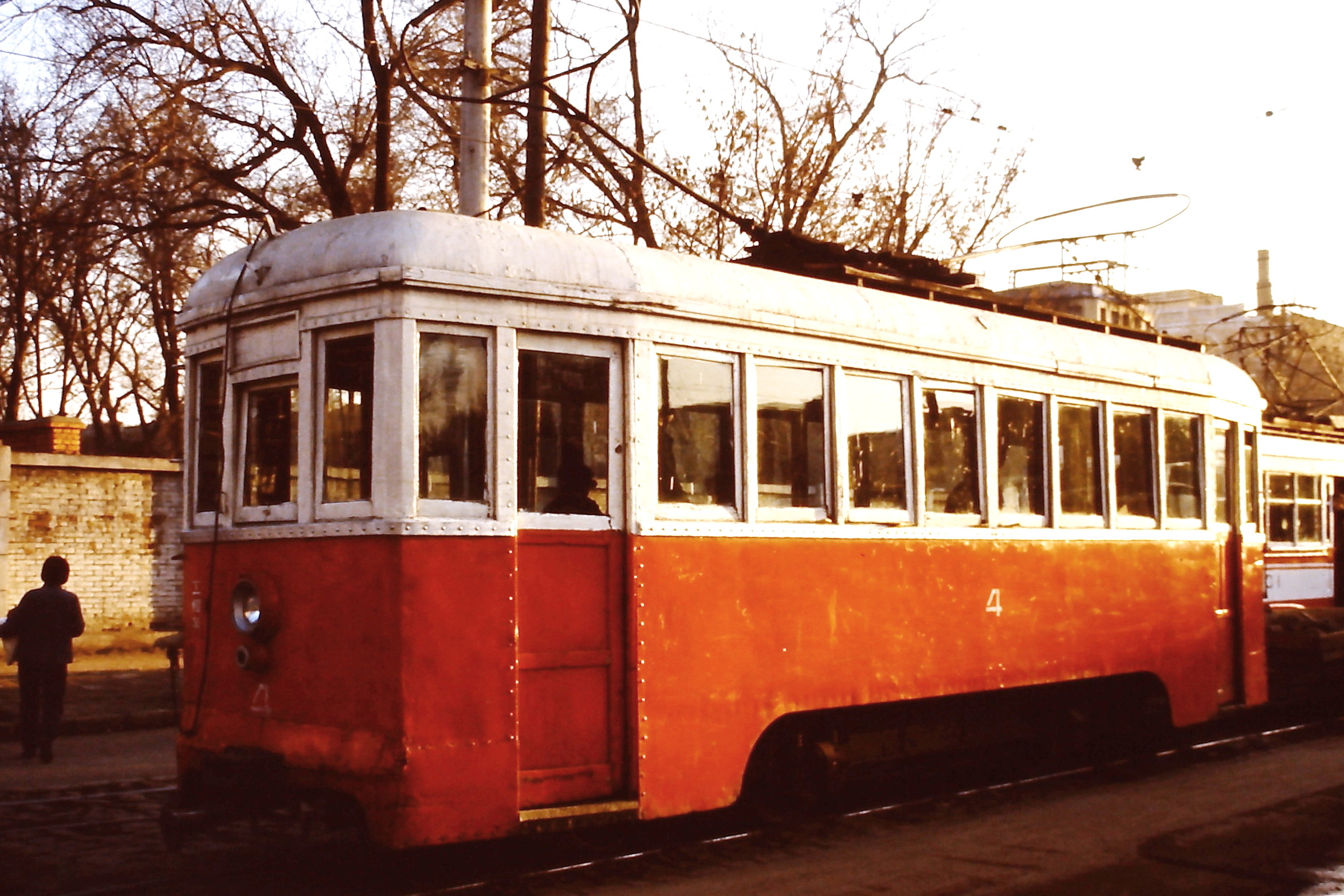
Shenyang (first generation) tram car

Shenyang's tram was one of the modern tram in Asia. There were two closed type coaches. Electricity were drawn by bow collectors. However, after that tramway had very little upgrade and basically the 1930s electric cars were still running in the 1970s.

== Depots & termini ==
Huai door, Taiqinggong, West Gate Mukden Railway Station was some of the termini.

== See also ==
- Shenyang Modern Tram - The second generation tram in Shenyang
- Shenyang Metro
- Changchun Tram
- Dalian Tram
- Hong Kong Tram
- Qingdao Tram
