= Trams in Tbilisi =

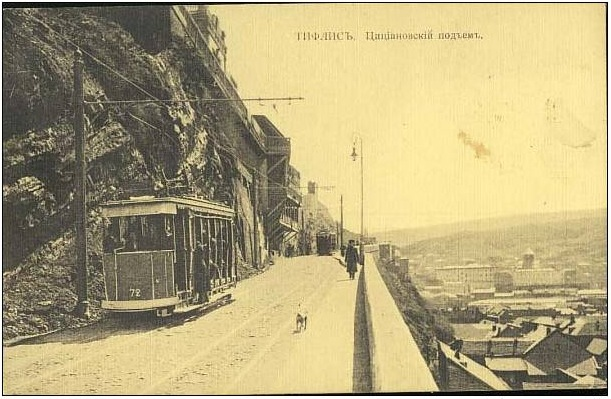
- Tram in Tbilisi (ca. 1900)

Overview
- Locale: Tbilisi, Georgia
- Transit type: Broad gauge (from 1930s) Tram line
- Number of lines: 21

Operation
- Began operation: 3 April 1883
- Ended operation: 4 December 2006
- Number of vehicles: 174 (1927); 299 (1965); 15 (2006)

Technical
- System length: 54 km (34 mi) (1986)
- Track gauge: 1,524 mm (5 ft)

The Tbilisi tramway network (Georgian: თბილისის ტრამვაი) operated in the Georgian capital city of Tbilisi between 1883 and 2006. In 1986 it extended to 105 km (65 miles) of (single) track covering 12 different routes.

== History ==
The tram service was opened in April 1883, using horse traction. It was electrified between June 1904 and August 1905, and was taken over by the municipality in 1915. The original metre gauge track was replaced between 1933 and 1942 with broad gauge, which corresponded with the Soviet standard.

The early post-war period saw further expansion, with the extent of the network reaching 105 km (65 miles), and up to 300 tramcars in use. Later the system used RVZ-6 tramcars from the Rīga Train and Tram Works and Russian KTM-5s. However, after the 1960s the city's tram network declined and contracted, faced by competition from the new Tbilisi Metro and a shortage of available cash for investment and infrastructure maintenance. While tram lines in downtown were one by one dismantled the network expanded in newly built suburbs till 1986. By 2000 only 8 tramlines were operating, which was down to 2 lines by 2003. By 2005 just one line (Route 12) was operating, and this remained in service till near the end of 2006.

On 4 December 2006 tram system together with trolleybus system was closed, most of the remaining Tbilisi tram rails, as well as the city's trolleybus infrastructure, were removed in few years.

== Remnants ==
A few isolated tram rails remain in place, along with some of the overhead cabling. Many of the supporting poles have found alternative uses as mounting posts for street lights. A few of the historical tramcars are used as street cafes. There is also an abandoned tram depot in Avchala near zahesi.

== Future ==
Plans once existed to reactivate the Tbilisi tram network, with the construction of new lengths of dedicated track for a modern light-rail system. In 2025, Tbilisi mayor Kakha Kaladze announced the construction of a new tram system which would link the settlement of Didi Dighomi to Didube metro station.

== See also ==
- Tram
- Tbilisi
