= List of town tramway systems in Oceania =

This is a list of cities and towns in Australia, New Zealand and elsewhere in Oceania that have, or once had, town tramway (urban tramway, or streetcar) systems as part of their public transport system.

== Australia (by state) ==
=== Australian Capital Territory ===
Location	Name of system	Traction type	Date (From)	Date (To)	Notes
Canberra	Light rail in Canberra	Electric	20 April 2019		Light rail

=== New South Wales ===
Location	Name of system	Traction type	Date (From)	Date (To)	Notes
Broken Hill	Silverton Tramway	Steam	15 February 1902	31 December 1926	
Maitland		Steam	8 February 1909	31 December 1926	
Newcastle	Trams in Newcastle	Steam	19 July 1887	2 November 1930	
Newcastle	Trams in Newcastle	Electric	15 December 1923	10 June 1950	,
Newcastle	Newcastle Light Rail	Electric	17 February 2019		Light rail
Sydney	Trams in Sydney	Horse	23 December 1861	31 December 1866	Also 16 – 29 September (?) 1879, May (?) – 30 June 1894.
Sydney	Trams in Sydney	Steam	30 September 1879	1910	
Sydney	Trams in Sydney	Cable	1894	14 January 1905	
Sydney	Trams in Sydney	Electric	9 November 1890 8 December 1899	20 April 1892 25 February 1961	
Sydney	Light rail in Sydney	Electric	1 September 1997 (Trial service 11 August 1997)		Light rail
♦ Arncliffe – Bexley		Steam	13 October 1909	31 December 1926	
♦ Ashfield – Burwood – Concord		Steam	1891	1912	
♦ Campbelltown – Camden		Steam	10 March 1882	June 1901	Replaced by railway stock (railway passenger service withdrawn 31 December 1963).
♦ Enfield		Steam	23 September 1891	1912	
♦ Enfield		Electric	4 February 1912	21 August 1948	
♦ Kogarah – Sans Souci		Steam	10 September 1887	4 July 1937	Electrification started, not completed. Replaced by trolleybuses.
♦ Manly		Steam	14 February 1903	1911	
♦ Manly		Electric	1 May 1911	12 October 1939	
♦ North Sydney		Cable	22 May 1886	10 February 1900	
♦ North Sydney		Electric	19 September 1893	28 June 1958	Extended over new Sydney Harbour Bridge to underground terminal at Wynyard station, Sydney, 20 March 1932.
♦ Parramatta – Castle Hill		Steam	18 August 1902	31 December 1926	
♦♦ Parramatta (Wharf)		Steam	1 October 1883	31 March 1943	Last steam tramway in Sydney area.
♦ Rockdale – Brighton-le-Sands		Steam	9 November 1885	1900	
♦ Rockdale – Brighton-le-Sands		Electric	27 July 1900	3 September 1949	
♦ Sutherland – Cronulla		Steam	12 June 1911	3 August 1931	
Yass		Steam	1 April 1891	1907	Rebuilt as a railway and operated with railway stock (railway passenger service withdrawn 17 May 1958).

=== Queensland ===
Location	Name of system	Traction type	Date (From)	Date (To)	Notes
Brisbane	Trams in Brisbane	Horse	1885	1899	
Brisbane	Trams in Brisbane	Electric	1897	1969	
Gold Coast	G:link	Electric	2014		
Rockhampton	Trams in Rockhampton	Steam	1909	1939	Restored heritage route from 1988.

=== South Australia ===
Location	Name of system	Traction type	Date (From)	Date (To)	Notes
Adelaide	Trams in Adelaide	Horse	10 July 1878	25 June 1914	
Adelaide	Trams in Adelaide	Electric	9 March 1909	22 November 1958	
♦ Port Adelaide	Trams in Adelaide	Steam	1879	1882	
♦ Port Adelaide	Trams in Adelaide	Horse	1882	2 April 1917	
♦ Port Adelaide	Trams in Adelaide	Electric	3 April 1917	27 July 1935	
♦ Glenelg	Trams in Adelaide	Horse	?	1914	
♦♦ Adelaide – Glenelg	Trams in Adelaide/Glenelg tram line	Steam	4 August 1873	1929	
♦♦ Adelaide – Glenelg	Trams in Adelaide/Glenelg tram line	Electric	14 December 1929		Light rail
Victor Harbor	Victor Harbor Horse Drawn Tram	Horse	1894	1956	
Victor Harbor	Victor Harbor Horse Drawn Tram	Horse	14 June 1986		Replica tram cars

=== Tasmania ===
Location	Name of system	Traction type	Date (From)	Date (To)	Notes
Hobart	Trams in Hobart	Electric	21 September 1893	21 October 1960	
Launceston	Trams in Launceston	Electric	4 August 1911	13 December 1952	

=== Victoria ===
Location	Name of system	Traction type	Date (From)	Date (To)	Notes
Ballarat	Trams in Ballarat	Horse	December 1887	1905	
Ballarat	Trams in Ballarat	Electric	1905	19 September 1971	
Ballarat	Ballarat Tramway Museum	Electric	1 February 1975		, heritage tram, a company founded in 1971, from 1971 to 1975 the construction of the track
Bendigo	Trams in Bendigo	Accumulator (storage battery)	14 June 1890	23 September 1890	
Bendigo	Trams in Bendigo	Steam	1 February 1892	June 1902	
Bendigo	Trams in Bendigo	Electric	15 April 1903	16 April 1972	
Bendigo	Bendigo Tramways	Electric	9 December 1972		Part of system reopened as heritage/tourist tramway.
Geelong	Trams in Geelong	Electric	10 March 1912	23 March 1956	
Melbourne	Trams in Melbourne	Horse	20 December 1884	November 1923	
Melbourne	Trams in Melbourne	Cable	11 November 1885	26 October 1940	
Melbourne	Trams in Melbourne	Electric	11 October 1906		Ranked as largest operating tram system in world (by system length).
♦ Box Hill – Doncaster		Electric	14 October 1889	6 January 1896	
♦ St Kilda – Brighton Beach (Victorian Railways)		Electric	7 May 1906	28 February 1959	
♦ Sandringham – Black Rock (Victorian Railways)		Electric	10 March 1919	5 November 1956	
♦ Footscray		Electric	6 September 1921	10 March 1962	Connection with Melbourne tramway system opened 2 May 1954, service by Melbourne system continues.
Portland		Cable/ombustion engine	2 March 2002		old vintage Melbourne cable trams
Sorrento		Steam tram	1889	1921	

=== Western Australia ===
Location	Name of system	Traction type	Date (From)	Date (To)	Notes
Kalgoorlie	Trams in Kalgoorlie	Electric	10 May 1902	10 March 1952	
Leonora		Steam	1901	1908	
Leonora		Electric	November 1908	25 June 1914	Fleet: one car.
Leonora		Petrol (gasoline)	1915	1921	Fleet: one car ,
Perth	Trams in Perth	Electric	28 September 1899	19 July 1958	
Whiteman Park (major tourist destination located 28 km from the Perth)	Perth Electric Tramway Society Operator of Western Australia's Heritage Tramway	Electric	1980		heritage tram
Fremantle	Trams in Fremantle	Electric	30 October 1905	8 November 1952	-

== Fiji ==
Location	Name of system	Traction type	Date (From)	Date (To)	Notes
Levuka		Horse	1884	?	see Rail transport in Fiji
Suva		Horse	1880s	?	see Rail transport in Fiji

== New Zealand ==
=== North Island ===
Location	Name of system	Traction type	Date (From)	Date (To)	Notes
Auckland	City of Auckland Tramways	Horse	11 August 1884	1903	
Auckland	Auckland Electric Tramways (subsidiary of British Electric Traction)	Electric	24 November 1902	29 December 1956	Official opening 17 November 1902. Public service commenced on 24 November
Auckland	MOTAT's Westerns Springs Tramway. 1.72km	Steam, Electric	16 December 1967	Present	Heritage tramway MOTAT Trams
Auckland	Auckland's Dockline Tramway, Wynyard Quarter. 1.5km	Electric	6 August 2011	Present	Heritage tramway Dockline Tram
♦ Devonport (North Shore)	Devonport and Lake Takapuna Tramway	Horse	September 1886	1888	
♦ Takapuna	Takapuna Tramways and Ferry Company	Steam	22 December 1910	26 April 1927	
Gisborne	Gisborne Tramways	Accumulator (storage battery)	13 April 1913	8 July 1929	
Napier	Napier Corporation Tramways	Electric	8 September 1913	3 February 1931	Closed because of earthquake damage (see 1931 Hawke's Bay earthquake).
New Plymouth	New Plymouth Tramways	Electric	10 March 1916	23 July 1954	
Thames		Steam	2 December 1871	November 1874	
Wanganui	Wanganui Corporation Tramways	Electric	11 December 1908	24 September 1950	
Wellington	Wellington tramway system	Steam	August 1878	1882	
Wellington	Wellington tramway system	Horse	August 1878	1904	
Wellington	Wellington tramway system	Electric	30 June 1904	2 May 1964	

=== South Island ===
Location	Name of system	Traction type	Date (From)	Date (To)	Notes
Christchurch	Christchurch tramway system	Steam	March 1880	by 1914	
Christchurch	Christchurch tramway system	Horse	1882	by 1914	
Christchurch	Christchurch tramway system	Electric	6 June 1905	11 September 1954	
Christchurch	Preservation era	Horse, Steam, Electric	6 January 1968		Heritage tramway
Christchurch	Modern era	Electric	4 February 1995		Heritage tramway
Dunedin	Dunedin City Corporation	Steam	July 1879	1884	
Dunedin	Dunedin City Corporation	Horse	July 1879	1905	
Dunedin	Dunedin City Corporation	Cable	24 February 1881	2 March 1957	see Dunedin cable tramway system.
Dunedin	Dunedin City Corporation	Electric	24 December 1903	29 March 1956	.
♦ Maori Hill	Roslyn Tramway Company	Horse	1882	1900	
♦ Maori Hill	Roslyn Tramway Company	Electric	23 October 1900	1 July 1936	First electric tramway in New Zealand.
Invercargill	Invercargill Tramways	Horse	3 December 1881	15 March 1908	
Invercargill	Invercargill Tramways	Electric	26 March 1912	10 September 1952	World's southernmost electric town tramway.
Nelson		Horse	7 May 1862	1901	

== United States (by state ) ==
=== Hawaii ===
See List of town tramway systems in the United States (Hawaii section)

== See also ==
- List of town tramway systems in Africa
- List of town tramway systems in Asia
- List of town tramway systems in Central America
- List of town tramway systems in North America
- List of town tramway systems in South America
- List of town tramway systems
- List of light-rail transit systems
- List of rapid transit systems
- List of trolleybus systems
