= List of acts of the Parliament of Western Australia from 1900 =

This is a list of acts of the Parliament of Western Australia for the year 1900.

== 1900 ==
Short title, or popular name	Citation	Royal assent
Long title
Australasian Federation Enabling Act (Western Australia) 1900	63 Vict. No. 55	13 June 1900
An Act to make provision for the acceptance and enactment of a Federal Constitution for Australasia.
	63 Vict. No. 56	14 June 1900
An Act to apply out of the Consolidated Revenue Fund and from Moneys to Credit of the General Loan Fund the sum of Four Hundred and Fifty Thousand Pounds (Note: £450,000 in 1900 is equivalent to A$81,500,000 in 2022.) to the Service of the Year ending 30th June, 1901.
	64 Vict. No. 1	25 September 1900
An Act to apply out of the Consolidated Revenue Fund and from Moneys to Credit of the General Loan Fund the sum of Five Hundred Thousand Pounds (Note: £500,000 in 1900 is equivalent to A$90,500,000 in 2022.) to the Service of the Year ending 30th June, 1901.
	64 Vict. No. 2	25 September 1900
An Act to correct certain errors in the Constitution Acts Amendment Act, 1899. (Note: Constitution Acts Amendment Act 1899 (63 Vict. No. 19))
	64 Vict. No. 3	5 October 1900
An Act to repeal Duties on Live Stock and Frozen Meat.
	64 Vict. No. 4	5 December 1900
An Act to apply a sum out of the Consolidated Revenue Fund and from Moneys to Credit of the General Loan Fund to the Services of the Year ending the last day of June, One thousand nine hundred and one, and to appropriate the Supplies granted in this and the previous Session of Parliament.
Constitution Act Amendment Act 1900	64 Vict. No. 5	5 December 1900
An Act relating to Members of the Federal Parliament of the Commonwealth of Australia.
Federal House of Representatives Western Australian Electorates Act 1900	64 Vict. No. 6	5 December 1900
An Act for determining the Divisions in Western Australia for which Members of the Federal House of Representatives shall be chosen, and the Number of Members for each Division.
	64 Vict. No. 7	5 December 1900
An Act to amend the Game Act, 1892. (Note: Game Act 1892 (55 Vict. No. 36))
Municipal Institutions Act 1900	64 Vict. No. 8	5 December 1900
An Act to consolidate and amend the Law relating to Municipalities.
	64 Vict. No. 9	5 December 1900
An Act to amend the Truck Act, 1899. (Note: Truck Act 1899 (63 Vict. No. 15))
Post Office Savings Bank Act 1900	64 Vict. No. 10	5 December 1900
An Act to amend the Post Office Savings Bank Consolidation Act, 1893. (Note: Post Office Savings Bank Consolidation Act 1893 (57 Vict. No. 3))
Noxious Weeds Act 1900	64 Vict. No. 11	5 December 1900
An Act for the Extirpation of Noxious Weeds.
Trustees Colonial Investment Act 1900	64 Vict. No. 12	5 December 1900
An Act to facilitate the Investment in Western Australian Government Securities of Trust and other Funds in the United Kingdom.
Loan Act 1900	64 Vict. No. 13	5 December 1900
An Act to authorise the raising of a sum of Seven Hundred and Ninety Thousand Pounds (Note: £790,000 in 1900 is equivalent to A$143,100,000 in 2022.) by Loan for the construction of certain Public Works, and other purposes.
	64 Vict. No. 14	5 December 1900
An Act to impose certain Customs Duties subject to the provisions of the Commonwealth of Australia Constitution Act. (Note: Commonwealth of Australia Constitution Act 1900 (63 & 64 Vict. c. 12 (Imp)))
Land Act Amendment Act 1900	64 Vict. No. 15	5 December 1900
An Act to further amend the Land Act, 1898. (Note: Land Act 1898 (62 Vict. No. 37))
Distillation Act 1900	64 Vict. No. 16	5 December 1900
An Act to amend and consolidate the Laws relating to Distillation.
Trustees Act 1900	64 Vict. No. 17	5 December 1900
An Act to consolidate and amend the law relating to Trustees.
Exportation of Arms Act 1900	64 Vict. No. 18	5 December 1900
An Act to amend the Law relating to the Export of Arms, Military and Naval Stores, and Munitions of War.
Conspiracy and Protection of Property Act 1900	64 Vict. No. 19	5 December 1900
An Act amending the Law relating to Conspiracy and Protection of Property.
Industrial Conciliation and Arbitration Act 1900	64 Vict. No. 20	5 December 1900
An Act to facilitate the Settlement of Industrial Disputes by Conciliation and Arbitration.
Public Service Act 1900	64 Vict. No. 21	5 December 1900
An Act relating to the Public Service.
Land Drainage Act 1900	64 Vict. No. 22	5 December 1900
An Act to provide for the Drainage of Land.
Goldfields Act Amendment Act 1900	64 Vict. No. 23	5 December 1900
An Act to amend the Goldfields Act, 1895, (Note: Goldfields Act 1895 (59 Vict. No. 40)) and the Acts passed in 1896 (Note: Goldfields Act Amendment Act 1896 (60 Vict. No. 36)) and 1898, (Note: Goldfields Act 1895 Amendment Act 1898 (62 Vict. No. 16)) amending the same.
Railways Amendment Act 1900	64 Vict. No. 24	5 December 1900
An Act to amend the Railways Amendment Act, 1881. (Note: Railways Amendment Act 1881 (44 Vict. No. 17))
Health Act Amendment Act 1900	64 Vict. No. 25	5 December 1900
An Act to amend the Health Act, 1898. (Note: Health Act 1898 (62 Vict. No. 24))
Carriage of Mails Act 1900	64 Vict. No. 26	5 December 1900
An Act for requiring the Proprietors of Railways to carry Mails.
	64 Vict. No. 27	5 December 1900
An Act to amend the Act of the Sixth Year of Her Majesty, numbered Fifteen, (Note: 6 Vict. No. 15) as to Interest on Judgments.
Bills of Sale Act Amendment Act 1900	64 Vict. No. 28	5 December 1900
An Act to amend the Law relating to Bills of Sale, Liens, and Bailments.
	64 Vict. No. 29	5 December 1900
An Act to amend the Criminal Law Amendment Act of 1892. (Note: Criminal Law Amendment Act 1892 (55 Vict. No. 24))
	64 Vict. No. 30	5 December 1900
An Act to amend the Lands Resumption Act, 1894. (Note: Lands Resumption Act 1894 (58 Vict. No. 33))
Registration of Births, Deaths, and Marriages Amendment Act 1900	64 Vict. No. 31	5 December 1900
An Act to amend the Registration of Births, Deaths, and Marriages Act, 1894. (Note: Registration of Births, Deaths, and Marriages Act 1894 (58 Vict. No. 16))
Payment of Members Act 1900	64 Vict. No. 32	5 December 1900
An Act to provide for the Payment of Members of Parliament.
	64 Vict. No. 33	5 December 1900
An Act to allow Kangaroos to be taken for Food during a Close Season and on Native Game Reserves.
	64 Vict. No. 34	5 December 1900
An Act to repeal the Twenty-third Section of the Post and Telegraph Act, 1893. (Note: Post and Telegraph Act 1893 (57 Vict. No. 5))
Kalgoorlie Municipal Loans Re-appropriation Act 1900	64 Vict. No. 35	5 December 1900
An Act to authorise the Re-appropriation of certain Loan Moneys borrowed by the Council of the Municipality of Kalgoorlie.
Slander of Women Act 1900	64 Vict. No. 36	5 December 1900
An Act to amend the Law relating to the Slander of Women.
	64 Vict. No. 37	5 December 1900
An Act to amend the Imperial Act 9th and 10th Victoria, Chapter 93 (Note: Fatal Accidents Act 1846 (9 & 10 Vict. c. 93 (Imp))) (adopted in Western Australia by the Act 12th Victoria, No. 21), (Note: Imperial Acts Adopting Ordinance 1849 (12 Vict. No. 21)) for compensating the Families of Persons killed by Accident.
Fire Brigades Board Debenture Act 1900	64 Vict. No. 38	5 December 1900
An Act to enable the Fire Brigades Board to issue Debentures.
Patent Act (Amendment) 1900	64 Vict. No. 39	5 December 1900
An Act to amend the Patent Act, 1888, (Note: Patent Act 1888 (52 Vict. No. 5)) and the Patent Act (Amendment), 1892. (Note: Patent Act (Amendment) Act 1892 (55 Vict. No. 15))
	64 Vict. No. 40	5 December 1900
An Act to repeal an Act of the Sixty-second year of Her Majesty, and numbered eighteen, intituled "An Act to vest certain land at Coolgardie in the Municipality of Coolgardie, for a Mining Exhibition and other purposes." (Note: 62 Vict. No. 18)
Brown Hill Loop Kalgoorlie-Gnumballa Lake Railway Act 1900	64 Vict. No. 41	5 December 1900
An Act to authorise the construction of a Loop Line of Railway from the Hannan's Street Station, Kalgoorlie-Gnumballa Lake Railway, to the Kamballie Station, on the same Railway.
Leederville Tramways Act 1900	64 Vict. No. 42	5 December 1900
An Act to confirm a Provisional Order authorising the Construction of Tramways in the Municipality of Leederville.
	Provisional Order.	
Kalgoorlie Tramways Act 1900	64 Vict. No. 43	5 December 1900
An Act to confirm a Provisional Order authorising the construction of Tramways in the Municipality of Kalgoorlie.
	Provisional Order.	
Town of Fremantle Tramways Act 1900	64 Vict. No. 44	5 December 1900
An Act to confirm a Provisional Order authorising the Construction of Tramways in the Town of Fremantle.
	Provisional Order.	
Kalgoorlie Road Board District Tramways Act 1900	64 Vict. No. 45	5 December 1900
An Act to confirm a Provisional Order authorising the construction of Tramways in the District of the Road Board of Kalgoorlie.
	Provisional Order.	
Streets and Thoroughfares (Victoria Park) Closure Act 1900	64 Vict. No. 46	5 December 1900
An Act to authorise the Closing of Portions of certain Streets and Thoroughfares (Note: Cashel Street and Colombo Street, between Washington Street and Gloucester Street, where Raphael Park now stands.) in the Municipality of Victoria Park, and the vesting thereof in Tier Majesty the Queen.
	64 Vict. No. 47	5 December 1900
An Act for the Closing of certain Roads and Streets.
	64 Vict. No. 48	5 December 1900
An Act for the Closing of Water Street, North Fremantle.
	64 Vict. No. 49	5 December 1900
An Act to validate Two Rates made by the Boulder Local Board of Health for the years One thousand eight hundred and ninety-nine and One thousand nine hundred respectively

== Sources ==
- "legislation.wa.gov.au".
