= List of acts of the Parliament of Western Australia from 1902 =

This is a list of acts of the Parliament of Western Australia for the year 1902.

== 1902 ==
=== Public acts ===
Short title, or popular name	Citation	Royal assent
Long title
	1 & 2 Edw. VII. No. 1	19 February 1902
An Act to apply a sum out of the Consolidated Revenue Fund and from Moneys to Credit of the General Loan Fund to the Services of the Year ending the last day of June, One thousand nine hundred and two, and to appropriate the Supplies granted in this Session of Parliament.
Wines, Beer, and Spirit Sale Amendment Act 1902	1 & 2 Edw. VII. No. 2	19 February 1902
An Act to amend the Wines, Beer, and Spirit Sale Act, 1880. (Note: Wines, Beer, and Spirit Sale Act 1880 (44 Vict. No. 9))
Gaols Acts Amendment Act 1902	1 & 2 Edw. VII. No. 3	19 February 1902
An Act to provide for the establishing of Lock-ups as Police Gaols, and to amend the law relating to Gaols, Prisons, and Houses of Correction.
Subiaco Reserves Act 1902	1 & 2 Edw. VII. No. 4	19 February 1902
An Act to authorise the Governor to exchange Perth Suburban Lots 270, 271, 272, and 273 for Swan Locations 118 and 119.
Workers' Compensation Act 1902	1 & 2 Edw. VII. No. 5	19 February 1902
An Act to amend the Law with respect to Compensation to Workers for Accidental Injuries suffered in the course of their Employment.
	1 & 2 Edw. VII. No. 6	19 February 1902
An Act to confirm certain Expenditure for the year ending 30th June, One thousand nine hundred.
Summary Jurisdiction (Married Women) Amendment Act 1902	1 & 2 Edw. VII. No. 7	19 February 1902
An Act to amend the Summary Jurisdiction (Married Women) Act, 1896. (Note: Summary Jurisdiction (Married Women) Act 1896 (60 Vict. No. 10))
Land Drainage Amendment Act 1902	1 & 2 Edw. VII. No. 8	19 February 1902
An Act to amend the Land Drainage Act, 1900. (Note: Land Drainage Act 1900 (64 Vict. No. 22))
	1 & 2 Edw. VII. No. 9	19 February 1902
An Act to confirm certain Expenditure for the Year ended 30th June, One thousand nine hundred and one.
Kalgoorlie Tramways Act 1900 Amendment Act 1902	1 & 2 Edw. VII. No. 10	19 February 1902
An Act to confirm a Further Provisional Order to amend or vary a Provisional Order authorising the Construction of Tramways in the Municipality of Kalgoorlie.
	In the matter of the Tramways Act, 1885, (Note: Tramways Act 1885 (49 Vict. No. 23)) and in the matter of an application by Ernest Edward Rogers, of Trustee Chambers, Barrack Street, Perth, in the State of Western Australia, Gentleman (hereinafter called "the Promoter"), for a Further Provisional Order to revoke, amend, extend, and vary, as hereinafter appears, the Provisional Order made by the Commissioner of Railways on the 18th day of December, 1899, and set forth in the Schedule to and confirmed by the Kalgoorlie Tramways Act, 1900 (Note: Kalgoorlie Tramways Act 1900 (64 Vict. No. 45)) (64 Vict., No. 45).	
Coolgardie Goldfields Water Supply Loan Re-allocation Act 1902	1 & 2 Edw. VII. No. 11	19 February 1902
An Act for the Re-allocation of certain moneys authorised to be raised by the Coolgardie Goldfields Water Supply Loan Act, 1896. (Note: Coolgardie Goldfields Water Supply Loan Act 1896 (60 Vict. No. 12))
	1 & 2 Edw. VII. No. 12	19 February 1902
An Act for the Closing of certain Roads and Streets.
Carnarvon Tramway Act 1902	1 & 2 Edw. VII. No. 13	19 February 1902
An Act to authorise the Construction of a Tramway from Carnarvon to Babbage Island Jetty.
Criminal Code Act 1902	1 & 2 Edw. VII. No. 14	19 February 1902
An Act to establish a Code of Criminal Law.
Permanent Reserves Amendment Act 1902	1 & 2 Edw. VII. No. 15	19 February 1902
An Act to amend the Permanent Reserves Act, 1899. (Note: Permanent Reserves Act 1899 (63 Vict. No. 24))
	1 & 2 Edw. VII. No. 16	19 February 1902
An Act to apply out of the Consolidated Revenue Fund the annual sum of Fourteen hundred pounds (Note: £1,400 in 1902 is equivalent to A$200,000 in 2022.) for the Salary of an additional Judge of the Supreme Court.
	1 & 2 Edw. VII. No. 17	19 February 1902
An Act to repeal the Prawn Fishing Act, 1876. (Note: Prawn Fishing Act 1876 (40 Vict. No. 2))
Bush Fires Act 1902	1 & 2 Edw. VII. No. 18	19 February 1902
An Act to diminish the Dangers resulting from Bush Fires.
Trade Unions Act 1902	1 & 2 Edw. VII. No. 19	19 February 1902
An Act to provide for the Regulation of Trade Unions.
Land Act Amendment Act 1902	1 & 2 Edw. VII. No. 20	19 February 1902
An Act to amend the Land Act, 1898. (Note: Land Act 1898 (62 Vict. No. 37))
Industrial Conciliation and Arbitration Act 1902	1 & 2 Edw. VII. No. 21	19 February 1902
An Act to amend the Law relating to the Settlement of Industrial Disputes by Conciliation and Arbitration.
Municipal Institutions Act Amendment Act 1902	1 & 2 Edw. VII. No. 22	19 February 1902
An Act to amend the Municipal Institutions Act, 1900. (Note: Municipal Institutions Act 1900 (64 Vict. No. 8))
Health Act Amendment Act 1902	1 & 2 Edw. VII. No. 23	19 February 1902
An Act to amend the Health Act, 1898. (Note: Health Act 1898 (62 Vict. No. 24))
Early Closing Act 1902	1 & 2 Edw. VII. No. 24	19 February 1902
An Act for the Early Closing of Shops, and to regulate the Hours of Employment in Shops and other Places of Business.
Coal Mines Regulation Act 1902	1 & 2 Edw. VII. No. 25	19 February 1902
An Act relating to Coal Mines.
North Perth and Perth Road Board Districts Tramways Act 1902	1 & 2 Edw. VII. No. 26	19 February 1902
An Act to confirm a Provisional Order authorising the Construction of Tramways in the Districts of the North Perth Road Board and of the Perth Road Board.
	Provisional Order.	
Metropolitan Water Works Amendment Act 1902	1 & 2 Edw. VII. No. 27	19 February 1902
An Act to provide for the Extension of the Metropolitan Waterworks, and to amend the Law relating to the same.
Royal Commissioners' Powers Act 1902	1 & 2 Edw. VII. No. 28	19 February 1902
An Act for procuring the Attendance of Witnesses before Royal Commissions.
Light and Air Act 1902	1 & 2 Edw. VII. No. 29	19 February 1902
An Act to restrict the operation of the Law of Prescription respecting Access and Use of Light and Air to Buildings.
Trading-stamps Abolition Act 1902	1 & 2 Edw. VII. No. 30	(Note: Assent of this act was reserved by the governor for Her Majesty's Pleasure.)
An Act to prevent the use of Trading-stamps.
	2 Edw. VII. No. 1	30 July 1902
An Act to apply out of the Consolidated Revenue Fund and from Moneys to Credit of the General Loan Fund the sum of One Million Pounds (Note: £1,000,000 in 1902 is equivalent to A$161,900,000 in 2022.) to the Service of the Year ending 30th June, 1903.
Explosives Act Amendment Act 1902	2 Edw. VII. No. 2	7 October 1902
An Act to amend the Explosives Act, 1895. (Note: Explosives Act 1895 (59 Vict. No. 38))
	2 Edw. VII. No. 3	7 October 1902
An Act to validate certain Fees purporting to have been charged by the Council of the City of Perth under the Building Acts.
Railway and Theatre Refreshment Rooms Licensing Act Amendment Act 1902	2 Edw. VII. No. 4	7 October 1902
An Act to amend the Railway and Theatre Refreshment Rooms Licensing Act, 1895. (Note: Railway and Theatre Refreshment Rooms Licensing Act 1895 (59 Vict. No. 15))
	2 Edw. VII. No. 5	7 October 1902
An Act to secure an Annuity to Susan Letitia O'Connor (Note: Wife of the late C. Y. O'Connor.) for Life.
	2 Edw. VII. No. 6	7 October 1902
An Act to apply out of the Consolidated Revenue Fund and from Moneys to Credit of the General Loan Fund the sum of Five Hundred Thousand Pounds (Note: £500,000 in 1902 is equivalent to A$81,000,000 in 2022.) to the Service of the Year ending 30th June, 1903.
Fremantle Prison Site Act 1902 (repealed)	2 Edw. VII. No. 7	18 November 1902
An Act to repeal an Ordinance passed in the fourteenth year of Her late Majesty, intituled "An Ordinance to vest the site of the Convict Prison at Fremantle in certain officers in trust for Her Majesty, Her Heirs and Successors, for ever," (Note: Fremantle Prison Site Ordinance 1851 (14 Vict. No. 22)) and to confirm certain grants of portions thereof. (Repealed by Statutes (Repeals and Minor Amendments) Act 1994 (No. 73))
Public Notaries Act 1902	2 Edw. VII. No. 8	18 November 1902
An Act to confirm the appointments of certain Public Notaries, and to provide for such appointments in future.
Marine Stores Act 1902	2 Edw. VII. No. 9	18 November 1902
An Act relating to Collectors of and Dealers in Marine Stores.
Transfer of Land Act Amendment Act 1902	2 Edw. VII. No. 10	18 November 1902
An Act to amend the Transfer of Land Act, 1893. (Note: Transfer of Land Act 1893 (56 Vict. No. 14))
Justices Act 1902 or the Criminal Procedure (Summary) Act 1902 (repealed)	2 Edw. VII. No. 11	18 November 1902
An Act ~~to consolidate and amend the Laws relating to Justices of the Peace and their Powers and Authorities~~ relating to the functions of courts of summary jurisdiction and to the procedures to be followed in such courts. (Repealed by Criminal Procedure and Appeals (Consequential and Other Provisions) Act 2004 (No. 84))
	2 Edw. VII. No. 12	18 November 1902
An Act to apply out of the Consolidated Revenue Fund and from Moneys to Credit of the General Loan Fund the sum of Five Hundred Thousand Pounds to the Service of the Year ending 30th June, 1903.
Agricultural Bank Act Amendment Act 1902	2 Edw. VII. No. 13	11 December 1902
An Act to further amend the Agricultural Bank Act, 1894. (Note: Agricultural Bank Act 1894 (58 Vict. No. 21))
Indecent Publications Act 1902 or the Indecent Publications and Articles Act 1902 (repealed)	2 Edw. VII. No. 14	11 December 1902
An Act to suppress Indecent and Obscene Publications and Articles. (Repealed by Censorship Act 1996 (No. 40))
Municipal Institutions Act Amendment Act 1902 (No. 2)	2 Edw. VII. No. 15	11 December 1902
An Act to amend the Municipal Institutions Act, 1900.
Public Service Act Amendment Act 1902	2 Edw. VII. No. 16	11 December 1902
An Act to amend the Public Service Act, 1900. (Note: Public Service Act 1900 (64 Vict. No. 21))
Fremantle Harbour Trust Act 1902 or the Fremantle Port Authority Act 1902 (repealed)	2 Edw. VII. No. 17	11 December 1902
An Act to constitute the Fremantle ~~Harbour Trust Commission~~ Port Authority; to regulate the appointment of Commissioners; to define the~~ir~~ powers and authorities of the Freemantle Port Authority; and for other purposes incidental thereto. (Repealed by Port Authorities (Consequential Provisions) Act 1999 (No. 5)
	2 Edw. VII. No. 18	11 December 1902
An Act to amend the Local Inscribed Stock Act, 1897. (Note: Local Inscribed Stock Act 1897 (61 Vict. No. 8))
Companies Act Amendment Act 1902	2 Edw. VII. No. 19	11 December 1902
An Act to amend the Companies Act, 1893. (Note: Companies Act 1893 (56 Vict. No. 8))
Mining Development Act 1902	2 Edw. VII. No. 20	11 December 1902
An Act to subsidise and enable Companies or Miners to further develop Gold or other Mines, and for other purposes.
Stamp Act Amendment Act 1902	2 Edw. VII. No. 21	11 December 1902
An Act to further amend the Stamp Act, 1882. (Note: Stamp Act 1882 (46 Vict. No. 6))
Post Office Savings Bank Act 1902	2 Edw. VII. No. 22	11 December 1902
An Act to amend the Post Office Savings Bank Consolidation Act, 1893. (Note: Post Office Savings Bank Consolidation Act 1893 (57 Vict. No. 3))
	2 Edw. VII. No. 23	20 December 1902
An Act for the Closing of certain Roads and Streets.
Reserves Act 1902	2 Edw. VII. No. 24	20 December 1902
An Act to enable the purpose of portions of Permanent Reserves No. 5691 A↑ and No. 5183 A↑ to be changed.
Broome Tramway Act 1902	2 Edw. VII. No. 25	20 December 1902
An Act to authorise the Construction of a Tramway from Broome Townsite to the head of Broome Jetty.
Derby Tramway Act 1902	2 Edw. VII. No. 26	20 December 1902
An Act to authorise the Construction of a Tramway from the Head of Derby Jetty to Derby Townsite.
Ashburton Tramway Act 1902	2 Edw. VII. No. 27	20 December 1902
An Act to authorise the Construction of a Tramway from Ashburton Townsite to the head of Ashburton Jetty.
Leonora Tramway Act 1902	2 Edw. VII. No. 28	20 December 1902
An Act to confirm a Provisional Order authorising the construction of a Tramway in the Municipality of Leonora.
Criminal Code Amendment Act 1902	2 Edw. VII. No. 29	20 December 1902
An Act to amend the Criminal Code.
Droving Act 1902	2 Edw. VII. No. 30	20 December 1902
An Act to regulate the Droving of Travelling Stock.
Police Act Amendment Act 1902	2 Edw. VII. No. 31	20 December 1902
An Act to further amend the Police Act, 1892. (Note: Police Act 1892 (55 Vict. No. 27))
Dividend Duties Act 1902	2 Edw. VII. No. 32	20 December 1902
An Act to impose Duties in respect of Dividends or Profits of Incorporated Companies.
Goldfields Water Supply Act 1902	2 Edw. VII. No. 33	20 December 1902
An Act to constitute the Goldfields Water Supply Board; to define the Powers and Duties of the Board; and for other purposes incidental thereto.
Rabbit Act 1902	2 Edw. VII. No. 34	20 December 1902
An Act to deal with the Rabbit Pest.
Railways Acts Amendment Act 1902	2 Edw. VII. No. 35	20 December 1902
An Act to amend the Railways Acts.
Health Act Amendment Act 1902	2 Edw. VII. No. 36	20 December 1902
An Act to further amend the Health Act, 1898. (Note: Health Act 1898 (62 Vict. No. 24))
Judges' Salaries Act 1902	2 Edw. VII. No. 37	20 December 1902
An Act to determine the rates of Salaries of the Judges of the Supreme Court.
City of Perth Tramways Act Amendment Act 1902	2 Edw. VII. No. 38	20 December 1902
An Act to confirm a Further Provisional Order to amend, extend, and vary certain Provisional Orders authorising the Construction of Tramways in the City of Perth.
	Further Provisional Order.	
Municipal Institutions Act Amendment Act 1902 (No. 3)	2 Edw. VII. No. 39	20 December 1902
An Act to further amend the Municipal Institutions Act, 1900.
Robb's Jetty–Woodman's Point Railway Act 1902	2 Edw. VII. No. 40	20 December 1902
An Act to authorise the Construction of a Railway from Robb's Jetty to Woodman's Point.
Malcolm–Laverton Railway Act 1902	2 Edw. VII. No. 41	20 December 1902
An Act to authorise the Construction of a Railway from Malcolm to Laverton.
Cemeteries Act Amendment Act 1902	2 Edw. VII. No. 42	20 December 1902
An Act to further amend the Cemeteries Act, 1897. (Note: Cemeteries Act 1897 (61 Vict. No. 23))
Fisheries Act Amendment Act 1902	2 Edw. VII. No. 43	20 December 1902
An Act to amend the Fisheries Act, 1899. (Note: Fisheries Act 1899 (63 Vict. No. 47))
Wines, Beer, and Spirit Sale Act Amendment Act 1902	2 Edw. VII. No. 44	20 December 1902
An Act to further amend the Wines, Beer, and Spirit Sale Act, 1880.
Kalgoorlie Electric Power and Lighting Corporation Limited Act 1902 (repealed)	2 Edw. VII. No. 45	20 December 1902
An Act to authorise the Grant of a Special Lease to the Kalgoorlie Electric Power and Lighting Corporation, Limited. (Repealed by Statute Law Revision Act 2006 (No. 37))
Collie–Collie-Boulder Railway Act 1902	2 Edw. VII. No. 46	20 December 1902
An Act to authorise the construction of a Railway from Collie to Collie-Boulder.
Public Works Act 1902 or the Land Acquisition and Public Works Act 1902	2 Edw. VII. No. 47	20 December 1902
An Act ~~to consolidate and amend the Laws~~ (Note: Long title altered by Acts Amendment (Land Administration) Act 1997 (No. 31).) relating to Public Works.
Roads Act 1902	2 Edw. VII. No. 48	20 December 1902
An Act to consolidate and amend the Law relating to Road Boards.
	2 Edw. VII. No. 49	20 December 1902
An Act to apply a sum out of the Consolidated Revenue Fund and from Moneys to Credit of the General Loan Fund and from Loan Suspense Account to the Services of the Year ending the last day of June, One thousand nine hundred and three, and to appropriate the Supplies granted in this Session of Parliament.

=== Private acts ===
Short title, or popular name	Citation	Royal assent
Long title
Roman Catholic Church Lands Amendment Act 1902	1 & 2 Edw. VII. Private Act	19 February 1902
An Act to amend the Ordinance 22nd Victoria, No. 4, (Note: Roman Catholic Church Lands Ordinance 1858 (22 Vict. No. 4)) and the Roman Catholic Church Lands Act, 1895, (Note: Roman Catholic Church Lands Act 1895 (59 Vict. Private Act)) and to enable the Bishop, for the time being, of each Diocese of the Roman Catholic Church to exercise, in respect of the lands within his Diocese, the powers granted by the said Act.

== Sources ==
- "legislation.wa.gov.au".
