= East Town railway station =

Former railway station in Whanganui, New Zealand

East Town

General information
- Location: East Town, Whanganui; New Zealand
- Coordinates: 39°54′52.1″S 175°04′19.5″E
- Elevation: 20 metres (66 ft)
- System: New Zealand Government Railways (NZGR)
- Line: Marton–New Plymouth line
- Distance: 41.32 kilometres (25.68 mi) from Marton
- Platforms: Passenger platform (left side)
- Tracks: Loop and sidings; marshalling yard from 1959

Construction
- Structure type: At-grade

History
- Opened: 1 December 1902
- Closed: Passenger: 12 April 1959
- Rebuilt: 1921 (new station building)
Location
Notes
- Previous Station: Okoia Station; Next Station: Aramoho Station

East Town railway station (also written Eastown or Easttown) was a railway station in the Whanganui locality of East Town, New Zealand, on the Marton–New Plymouth line between Okoia and Aramoho. An earlier station at the site operated from 1878 to 1893. A second station opened on 1 December 1902 as a flag station for passengers, parcels and goods, and for most of its life was overshadowed by the adjacent locomotive depot and the East Town Railway Workshops, which are covered in their own article. Passenger services ceased in 1959 when the East Town marshalling yard opened, and the stop was replaced for railcar passengers by a new station at Poutini Street.

== History ==
=== Locomotive depot and early station (1875–1893) ===
East Town was a railway site before it was a station in any meaningful passenger sense. A two-stall engine shed near the site of the Whanganui River bridge was let to contract in April 1875, with additions authorised and completed in 1877 and 1879 and further engine-shed accommodation recommended in 1880, 1884 and 1899. Workshops followed from 1879 (see East Town Railway Workshops). A railway wharf at East Town opened in September 1875 and is listed as closing about March 1885, with its removal recommended in August 1885. The line from Whanganui to Marton was opened for traffic on 4 February 1878.

Authority for a passenger station at East Town was sought in May 1877, and a station opened about April 1878, shortly after the line to Marton. A petition of May 1882 asked for the platform to be moved from the south to the north side of the line, the Wanganui County Council applied for a public siding in December 1886, and from 1 January 1891 the siding to the coal shed at the engine sheds was used for goods traffic. The station was recommended for closure in March 1893 and closed on 29 April, goods traffic having ended on 1 February. In May 1893 use of the coal shed siding for delivering goods to the public was under consideration, and petitioners in June asked for both a siding and a railway station.

=== Campaign for a new station (1893–1902) ===
In July 1896 East Town was recorded as having no accommodation, and in August 1897 a platform was described as necessary. A petition from the residents of Eastown and the neighbourhood for a railway station was presented to the Minister for Railways, Alfred Cadman, in June 1899. The department's response was conditional: the general manager of railways wrote that a siding would be of no benefit to the department and unlikely to increase revenue, and that the Minister would act only if those interested supplied land for a station site.

At a well-attended meeting of residents on 7 September 1899 it was reported that the department would erect a station if the land were provided. The one site it considered suitable, owned by John Anderson, was available for sale at a price to be settled by arbitration. The meeting appointed P. Lundon to act for the ratepayers and resolved to ask the Wanganui County Council to strike a special rate to cover the cost of the land. The proposed site was described as immediately opposite the new suburb of Ahuwhenua.

Residents petitioned for a flag station siding in August 1901. By October 1901 the department was considering a station just south of the East Town railway workshops, and Lundon had offered a strip of land from the Ahuwhenua block, allowing a slight realignment of the public road opposite the station siding, to which the local road board agreed. Additional land was taken for railway purposes in July 1902, and in late November the department announced that the station would open on Monday 1 December.

=== Flag station (1902–1957) ===
East Town station opened as a flag station for passengers, parcels and goods traffic on 1 December 1902. It was located between Aramoho and Okoia, 3 miles 69 chains from Wanganui, with a shelter shed, a passenger platform and a loop holding 23 wagons. Listings of 1904, 1906 and 1911 record the same facilities, with a cart approach to the platform noted from 1904. An application for stockyards was made in August 1909.

A station building was built in 1921 and the platform front rebuilt in 1922, with electric lighting installed in 1927. A caretaker was employed at the station, with the position recorded in 1931, 1948 and 1951.

The station was used for local outings as well as regular travel. In November 1929 schoolchildren travelling by train from south of Aramoho to a lawn tennis tournament at Wanganui East were advised to alight at East Town, which was close to the courts, while those coming from the north, and local children, were told to take the tram to its terminus.

A tramline to the station had been mooted well before the 1914 plan: in July 1910 a correspondent wrote that F. H. Allen, by then a borough councillor, had earlier put a scheme to Wanganui East ratepayers for a line from the existing bridge to the station, and asked for the details to be published so that it could be compared with the Plymouth Street and Dublin Street routes. The Wanganui East tram line, planned in 1914 with its terminus in Salisbury Avenue "as near as possible" to the station, was extended to Salisbury Avenue in November 1915. In February 1945 the line's terminus was still described as being next to the station, but services were cut back to Hakeke Street in mid-1949 because of the state of the track. See Trams in Wanganui.

=== Campaign for better facilities (1936–1938) ===
Local interests repeatedly pressed for improvements at East Town. On 8 July 1936 a deputation of Whanganui East interests and representatives of the Wanganui Agricultural and Pastoral Association, sponsored by the local tourist and development league, waited on Ormond Wilson, the member of parliament for Rangitikei, asking for loading sidings for stock at East Town and for the New Plymouth express to be stopped there so that southern passengers would have more time in the city on show day. Wilson promised to put the proposals to the Minister of Railways.

In July 1937 the Minister of Railways, D. G. Sullivan, declined requests from the Wanganui Tourist and Development League for the Wellington–New Plymouth express to stop at East Town and for better facilities for handling parcels. In a letter to J. B. Cotterill, the member for Wanganui, he stated that parcel traffic at East Town was very light, that a fair volume of goods traffic, principally bulk commodities, was handled in the siding, where accommodation was ample, and that the traffic did not warrant appointing a porter. He added that extra stops would lengthen the through journey for long-distance passengers, and that East Town was within easy reach of Aramoho. League members were unimpressed: one described the station as "a dirty dog's box", another suggested that the express's 25-minute stop at Aramoho be shortened instead, and it was decided to send a deputation to Wilson.

In June 1938 Cotterill told a meeting of electors at the Wanganui East Town Hall that improvements at East Town station which were "long overdue" had been carried out, without detailing them.

=== Saleyards proposal (1946) ===
In June 1946 a deputation of Whanganui district farmers asked the Wanganui City Council to allow stock and station firms to operate saleyards on a site of about 60 acres near the East Town station, backed by a petition of 263 farmers and by Federated Farmers. Only about 11 acres lay within the city boundary, the rest being in Wanganui County, and it was reported that the Railways Department had agreed to build a siding to the yards. Supporters argued that closer settlement and congestion had raised farmers' costs, and that stock had to be held at Taylorville and driven across the Town Bridge to the only existing saleyards, with accidents reported. The council had previously refused permission for saleyards at Whanganui East.

The proposal met organised opposition. In July 1946 a deputation of residents and the East Town branch of the Amalgamated Society of Railway Servants presented a counter-petition with 344 signatures, collected in under a week. They cited dust, noise, damage to unsealed roads and the effect on property values in what they described as a prime residential area, and warned of danger to children, including pupils of Wanganui East School, which had more than 600 children on its roll. A proposed new railway crossing between East Town and the saleyards site was described as a particular hazard. The council said it would consider the residents' views before reaching a decision.

=== Marshalling yard and closure to passengers (1957–1959) ===
A new marshalling yard was under way by June 1957, when it was recorded as having 27 floodlights. The station building (1921), its electric lighting and the platform front (1922) were demolished or abandoned in 1958. In February 1959 it was recorded that a caretaker was no longer warranted and payments were to cease.

A notice stated that, with the opening of the East Town Marshalling Yard from Sunday 12 April 1959, East Town would be eliminated as a passenger stopping place and replaced by a new station at Poutini Street, 36 chains south of Aramoho, for railcar passengers only. A record of 23 April 1959 noted that East Town had no facilities for handling parcels, mails or small lots of goods. The old station is listed as closed on 12 April 1959, the day the marshalling yard opened for goods traffic, with the yard opening generally on 3 May.

=== Marshalling yard (1959–1988) ===
A new Car and Wagon Depot, 100 by 67 feet with pits, was planned in August 1962. In August 1966 approval was given for gassing facilities for UA wagons, a high-level loading bank with four adjacent backshunts, and a further backshunt to a loading bank and shelter. The adjacent workshops closed in October 1986 and were sold in 1987. Goods traffic at the yard is listed as ending on 22 September 1986.

By November 1987 East Town was recorded as 41.32 km from Marton Junction Points on the Marton – New Plymouth – Breakwater line, with a separate "East Town Junction Points" location recorded at 42.65 km. East Town was still used for the timetabled running of trains in June 1988, and in November 1988 $8,000 was approved for fuelling facilities at East Town to replace those being demolished at Wanganui.

== Poutini Street station ==
Poutini Street station (39°54′36.6″S 175°03′36.1″E) was opened in 1959 as East Town's replacement, for railcar passengers only, 36 chains south of Aramoho. Records of 1963 and 1966 give its position as 0 miles 38 chains from Aramoho, 0 miles 54 chains from East Town and 103 miles 43 chains from New Plymouth. A prefabricated-type shelter shed was recorded in March 1971. The station closed about February 1977.

== Today ==
East Town remains a KiwiRail marshalling yard on the Marton–New Plymouth line, where trains cross and freight is berthed. In October 2019 KiwiRail began loading six log wagons a day at the East Town yard for transport to Port Taranaki, with capacity for up to 45,000 tonnes of logs a year.
