= Devonport and Lake Takapuna Tramway =

Horse tramway in New Zealand

Devonport & Lake Takapuna Tramway
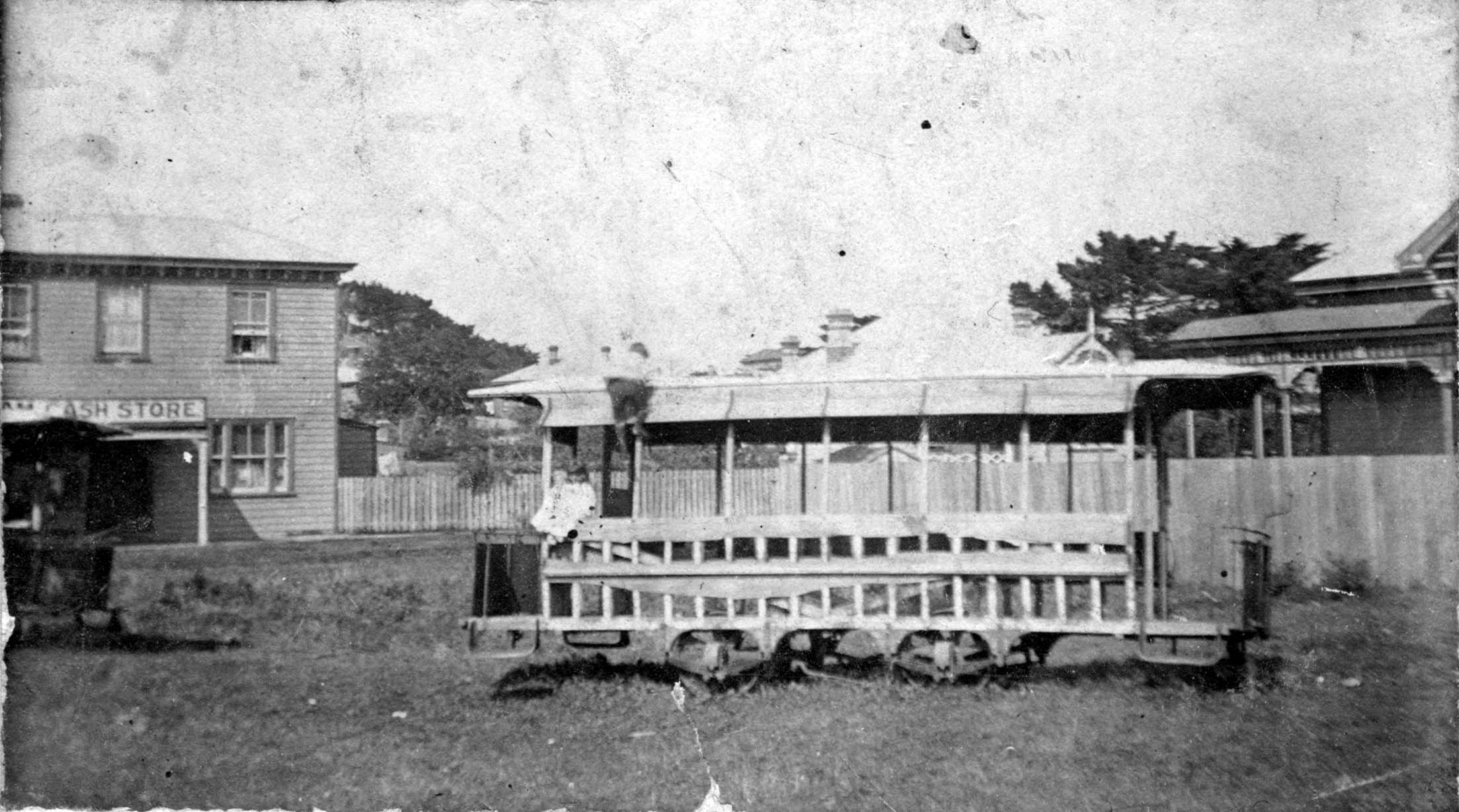

Overview
- Status: Abandoned
- Locale: Devonport, New Zealand
- Termini: Victoria Wharf; Cheltenham Beach
- Stations: 4

Service
- Type: Tram
- Rolling stock: 2 tramcars

History
- Opened: 25 September 1886
- Service paused: June 1888
- Franchise revoked: 19 December 1894

Technical
- Line length: 1 mi (1.6 km)
- Character: horse-powered
- Track gauge: 1,435 mm (4 ft 8 1/2 in) standard gauge

The Devonport & Lake Takapuna Tramway was a 1-mile (1.6 km) horse tramway system in Auckland, New Zealand, that operated between Victoria Wharf in Devonport to Cheltenham Beach from 1886 to 1888. It was the only commercial horsetram system to run on Auckland's North Shore.

== Incorporation and construction ==
The idea of a tramway between Devonport and Lake Pupuke to increase the marketability of real estate along the proposed route had first been proposed by the Devonport Steam Ferry Company in 1883. Though the ferry company did not pursue their proposal, a group of Devonport businessmen took the concept and incorporated the Devonport and Lake Takapuna Tramway Company, Ltd., on 19 August 1885. The original proposal was to build five sections:

- Section 1: Victoria Wharf to Cheltenham Beach
- Section 2: Victoria Wharf to Takapuna Wharf and Northcote School.
- Section 3: Victoria Wharf to Narrow Neck Beach
- Section 4: Victoria Wharf to Stanley Bay
- Section 5: a connection between sections 1 and 3 along Tainui Road or Oxford Terrace

The sale of shares was low forcing the company to prioritise the construction of Section 1.

Cousins and Atkin Carriage Factory assembled the two horse-powered tramcars. These were designed in such a way that the horse could be attached to either end and the seats could be reversed, eliminating the need for a turntable. The tramcars were delivered to Devonport on 29 April 1886. Bolton and Walsh began construction on the line in late March 1886 after several bureaucratic and technical delays. The road was completed in 8 July but testing revealed several faults and it was not certified until 19 July. Since it was the middle of winter, the company decided to delay the opening of the line until September.

== The route ==
The tramway began commercial operations on 25 September 1886. In addition to its termini, the tramway route had two stops, one at the head of Devonport Wharf at the bottom of Church Street, and another in the vicinity of Devonport Domain and Jubilee Avenue. A carbarn and horse paddock was also erected on Eton Avenue, accessible via a spur down Tainui Road. A planned passing siding may have been built near the halfway point of the line, but there is no contemporary evidence for it. A request to build a passenger ticket booth at the foot of Victoria Wharf was denied by the Auckland Harbour Board, so all tickets were sold by the conductor on the tram.

== Operational years and abandonment ==
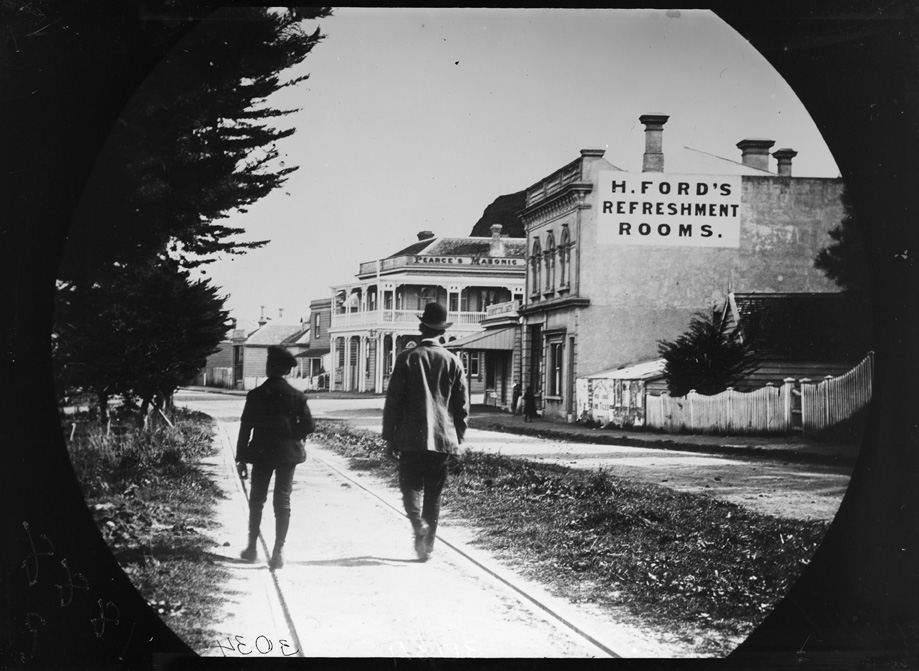
Two men approaching Church Street while walking on the Devonport tramway tracks, 1888.

The Devonport tramway was never profitable. It ran for less than five months continuously, during which time it reduced fares twice. Meanwhile, increasingly expensive lawsuits were levied against the company in late 1886 and early 1887, undercutting the company's profits. On 8 February 1887, the company was given a court order to close. The franchise was listed for sale to recoup costs and Robert and Richard Duder acquired it on 28 March. Robert Duder had served as a provisional director on the company's board before it was incorporated and it is likely both were investors.

For the next year, the Duders ran a reduced seasonal service on the line, closing during the winter months and sending the horses out to graze on Browns Island. In June 1888, the Duders petitioned the Devonport Borough Council to suspend service for the winter, but it was never resumed. Repeated attempts by the borough to reinstate the service or have the tracks removed went nowhere, and the Duders failed to maintain the right-of-way despite demands and threats that they would lose the franchise if they did not do so. In September 1894, the Foreman of Works requested the tracks be removed and the borough council financed the task. The franchise was formally terminated on 19 December 1894, transferring the tramway rights back to the borough council.

The tracks were removed in late December 1894 and in many places Beach Road, now King Edward Parade, was widened to absorb the former right-of-way. The rails were sold to the Michelson Timber Company near Aoroa south of Dargaville. The tramcars were abandoned beside the old carbarn on Eton Avenue. They were eventually removed and the property redeveloped around 1909.

== Later attempts ==
In 1898, Paul Hansen and William Napier obtained permission from the Waitemata County Council and the Borough of Devonport to build an electric tramway north from Devonport to a loop around Lake Pupuke. Hansen travelled to London to find recruit financiers for the venture, eventually persuading the British Electric Traction Company to fund it. However, this company was more interested in building an electric tramway system in Auckland City. Hansen acquired the franchise rights from William Gentry Bingham and the rights-of-way currently used by a horsetram system from Max Epstein. In March 1899, The Auckland Electric Tramways Company was formed, but nothing was announced about Devonport. Hansen requested two extensions from the Devonport Borough Council, the second of which in November 1900 was denied. The franchise rights reverted to the borough, although Napier fought for years to regain the franchise.

Following Hansen's failure, the borough council attached a £500 deposit to any future attempt to acquire the franchise rights for a tramway. Napier refused to pay, but in 1906, Edward Robert Nolan Russell, a solicitor, put down a deposit. Unlike previous attempts, Russell planned to keep his tramway network within the borough boundaries. The proposed route included branches to Narrow Neck, Stanley Bay, Cheltenham Beach, and the Takapuna Race Track. Russell also pledged to install electrical lighting throughout the borough. Had it been built, the route would have likely connected with the Takapuna Tramways & Ferry Company's system, which would run between Bayswater and Milford from 1910 to 1927. Russell acquired sufficient funds to incorporate on 28 July 1908 as the Devonport Transport Company. However, the new Tramways Act 1908 required a vote by ratepayers to build any municipal tram system. On 18 January 1909, residents voted overwhelmingly against construction of the tramway.

== See also ==
- Public transport in Auckland
- Public transport in New Zealand
- List of town tramway systems in Oceania
