= Trams in Invercargill =

Former tram system in Invercargill, New Zealand

Invercargill Tramways
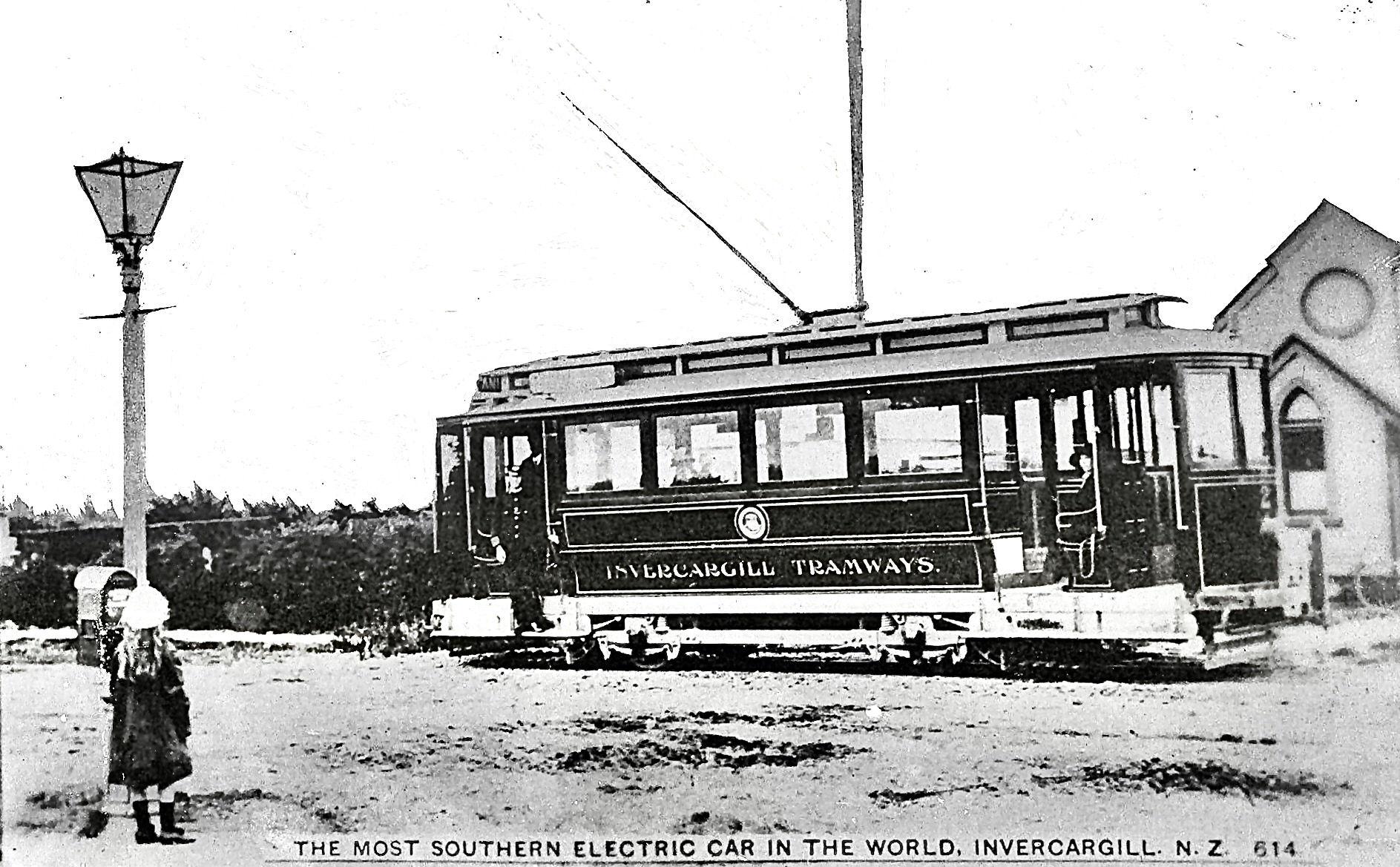
- An Invercargill electric tram, about 1912

Overview
- Owner: Southland Tramway Company (1881–1886); Invercargill and Suburban Tramway Company (1886–1890s); Joseph Ward and Walter Henderson (1890s–1908); Invercargill Borough Council (1912–1930); Invercargill City Council (1930–1952)
- Locale: Invercargill, New Zealand
- Transit type: Horse tram (1881–1908); Electric tram (1912–1952)
- Number of lines: 4 suburban branches (electric system, operated as 2 through-routes)

Operation
- Began operation: 3 December 1881
- Ended operation: 10 September 1952
- Operators: Southland Tramway Company; Invercargill and Suburban Tramway Company; Invercargill Corporation Tramways
- Number of vehicles: 16 powered electric trams (10 Boon cars and 6 Birney Safety Cars)

Technical
- System length: over 9 mi (14 km) (electric system, 1912)
- Track gauge: 1,067 mm (3 ft 6 in) (horse trams); 1,435 mm (4 ft 8 1/2 in) standard gauge (electric trams)

Trams in Invercargill operated in Invercargill, New Zealand, from 1881 to 1952. The city's first tramway was a privately operated horse-drawn system, which opened on 3 December 1881 and closed on 15 March 1908. A municipally owned electric tramway opened on 26 March 1912 and continued until 10 September 1952, when the remaining services were replaced by motor buses.

The electric tramway served four principal suburban destinations: Waikiwi, Georgetown, North Invercargill and South Invercargill. These were operated as two through-routes, connecting the northern and southern suburbs with the central business district. The South Invercargill line, terminating at Tramway Road, was described as the southernmost electric street tramway in the world.

The electric system operated a fleet of 16 tramcars, including six American-built Birney Safety Cars introduced in 1921. Several tramway-related buildings survive in Leven Street, including the former tram depot, powerhouse and municipal electricity offices. Three electric tramcar bodies have also survived, including Birney No. 15, restored for operation on the Christchurch heritage tramway.

== History ==
=== Horse tramways (1881–1908) ===
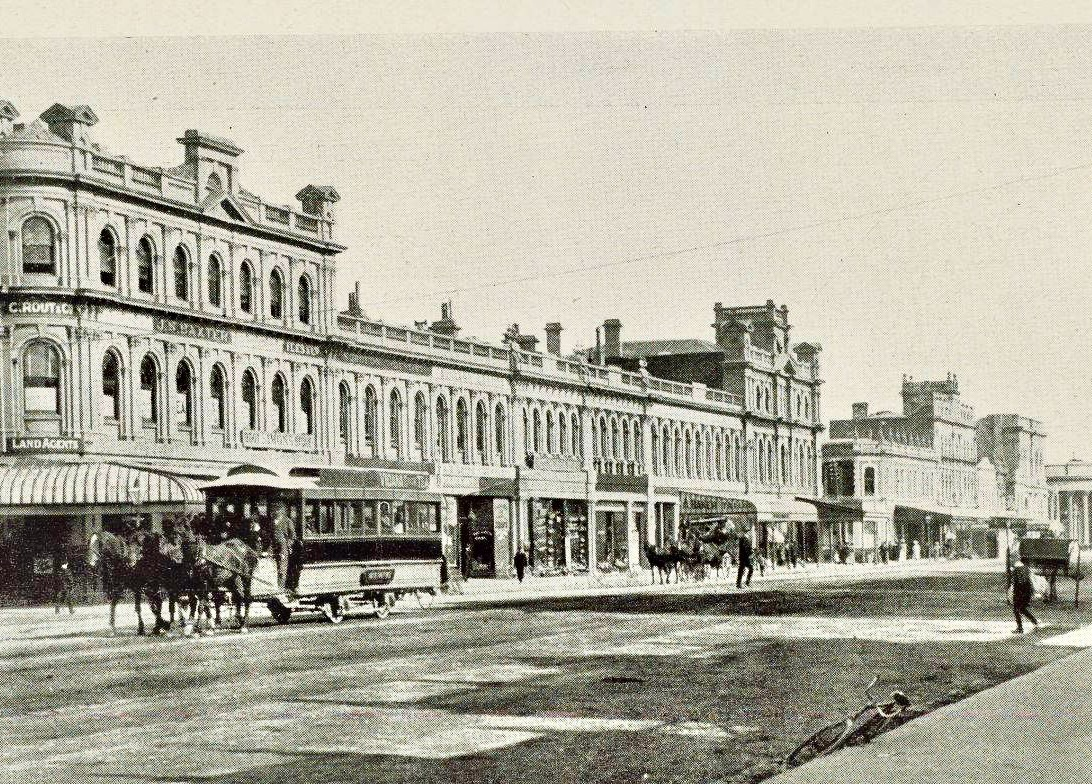
A horse-drawn tram in Dee Street, Invercargill, about 1908

The Southland Tramway Company was formed in 1880 to provide passenger transport between central Invercargill and its developing suburbs, and its prospectus was published in February 1880. Its original promoter was R. B. Williams. Its proposed network included a route from Waikiwi along the Main North Road and Dee Street to the railway station, continuing through central Invercargill towards East Road. The company promoted the town's broad streets and relatively level terrain as particularly suitable for tramway construction.

The first horse tramway opened on 3 December 1881, running from the Invercargill Post Office along Dee Street and North Road towards Gladstone.

The inaugural journey was disrupted when loose stones became lodged beneath the tram's wheels, causing it to leave the rails. The tram was subsequently returned to the track and the journey completed. The cars were equipped with conductors' bells, oil lamps and automatic fare-recording equipment, and normally required only one horse.

In June 1882 Waikiwi residents who had petitioned for an extension of about a mile were asked to apply for shares in the company. A branch along Tay Street and East Road to Mary Street opened in 1883, followed in December 1883 by a route along Tay and Conon Streets to Ettrick Street. An extension along Conon Street to Biggar Street opened in February 1884, and the northern route was extended from Gladstone to Waikiwi in October 1884. At the company's annual meeting in July 1884, shareholders were told that the year's business had made a loss of £262, and that 226 chains of line had been laid or were under contract.

The horse tramways were built to 1,067 mm (3 ft 6 in) gauge. The original rolling stock was imported from the Starbuck company in England and consisted of small and large single-truck saloon cars with clerestory roofs. A double-deck horse tram was constructed in 1887.

Initially, no tram services operated on Sundays. Weekday services continued until approximately 8.45 pm, while Saturday services ran until 10.45 pm. The horse stables and paddocks were situated at Gladstone, approximately halfway along the eventual route to Waikiwi.

Sunday running was contentious. A petition with more than 1000 signatures in favour of Sunday trams was reported in September 1881. By March 1882 the company was reported to be determined to run its cars on Sundays, and local cab drivers announced that they would ply for hire on that day too. In April 1882 notice was given of a motion in the town council pointing out that Sunday running was not permitted under the agreement between the council and the company. In July 1882 the directors decided, with one dissenting vote, to end Sunday traffic. Sunday services had resumed by late 1886, when the company's fare notice listed Sunday fares.

From 1 November 1886 the Invercargill and Suburban Tramway Company charged 3d from the Post Office to Gladstone, East Road and Appleby, and 6d single or 9d return to Waikiwi. Sunday fares were 6d single and 9d return. Monthly tickets were sold in business, workmen's and school classes, with workmen's tickets valid only on four named early-morning and evening cars.

The Southland Tramway Company's finances were poor. At its annual meeting in August 1885 shareholders were told that receipts had increased on the previous year but that the company was hampered by interest on its overdraft and by unpaid calls on shares, with its lines and equipment valued at £9,000. On 14 September 1885 shareholders resolved to go into liquidation, the bank having pressed for repayment of an overdraft of £6,000. An extraordinary general meeting was convened for 1 October 1885 to confirm the voluntary winding-up, and the company's assets, including the tramway concessions, were advertised for sale.

In September 1886 the borough councils of Invercargill, East Invercargill, Avenal and Gladstone each passed resolutions consenting to the liquidators' sale of the undertaking to the Invercargill and Suburban Tramway Company. East Invercargill made its consent conditional on the lines being laid at the side of its streets rather than in the centre. The new company took possession of the lines and plant on 1 October 1886, with J. Hatch, M.H.R., as business manager and H. E. Whitfield, formerly of Christchurch, as working manager. The transfer and mortgage assignment of the tramway concessions to the Bank of New South Wales were still awaiting confirmation by the Southland County Council in 1887.

The economic depression of the late 1880s further reduced patronage. Trams reportedly sometimes ran without passengers, and the undertaking experienced repeated financial losses. Track condition was a recurring concern for the local authorities: in February 1887 the county engineer reported that he had told the manager what was needed to make the line safe, and that about half a mile of metalling had since been done at the worst places. In October 1895 the borough council asked the company to attend to its rails in Conon Street, a line that was apparently out of use, which the company said it might either bring back into service or lift.

In April 1891 the plant, stock and concessions of the Invercargill and Suburban Tramway Company were advertised for auction. The undertaking subsequently passed to Sir Joseph Ward and Walter Henderson, who operated it as a private concern. In May 1896 the company invited tenders for about 60 tons of chaff for the twelve months to May 1897, to be delivered to its stables at Gladstone. A large car was destroyed by fire outside the company's buildings at Gladstone in the early hours of Monday 29 March 1897. It was insured for £200, the cause was unknown, and the ironwork was expected to be reused in a new car of similar design.

In June 1904 Ward, then described as a part-proprietor of the horse tramway, met the mayor and councillors to discuss electrifying the system. He said that a company formed for the purpose would need a lease of 40 years with the option of renewal, and that, if the corporation exercised its right to purchase, he did not expect the company to make a profit for between 10 and 15 years. The report noted that, rather than growing, the system had lost miles of track since it was established.

The horse tramway ran its last services on Sunday 15 March 1908. A newspaper correspondent reported that the last car from the Post Office carried passengers inside and on the roof, that Ward was then said to be sole proprietor of the rights, and that steam cars were expected to replace the horse cars, with a bus service running in the interim. The closure left the town without a conventional street tramway service until the introduction of municipal electric trams four years later.

=== Establishment of the electric tramways (1909–1912) ===
Before the borough decided to build its own system, the tramway concessionaires, who included Ward, had agreed with the council to build a new system. In October 1908 the council agreed to their request to amend the contract so that only part of the work had to be completed within nine months of the preceding May.

The Invercargill Borough Council decided in 1909 to establish a municipally owned electric tramway system. Ratepayers approved a loan of £75,000 towards the project, which included the construction of tram tracks, overhead electrical equipment, a generating station, tram depot, workshops and administration offices.

The council's electrical engineer and tramway manager, Scott Symington, recommended the construction of a combined tramway and electricity-generating complex in Leven Street. The Invercargill Tramway Buildings and Works Site Act 1910 authorised the use of part of a municipal reserve for the buildings and associated works.

Clearing of the Western Reserve to make ready for the powerhouse began in December 1910. Construction was formally inaugurated on 14 January 1911, when the Governor, Lord Islington, turned the first sod near the rotunda in Post Office Square, in the presence of Prime Minister Joseph Ward. The foundation stone of the tramway administration building in Leven Street was also laid that day.

On 26 January 1911 the borough council accepted tenders totalling £42,640 for the electric tramway, covering power house plant, permanent way material, car bodies from Boon and Company of Christchurch, overhead material, steel poles and street lighting plant. The lowest tender was not always accepted: the street lighting equipment was chosen because the power house used the same system, while the only rival tender was for a different one.

In July 1911 the council joined other municipal tramway authorities in opposing draft government tramway regulations that would have limited crush-hour loadings. The tramway engineer said the Invercargill cars would carry 32 passengers, that the proposed limit of 56 in busy periods was too restrictive, and that they could accommodate at least 80; Mayor W. A. Ott and Scott Symington were appointed the council's delegates to a conference in Wellington.

Progress was slower than hoped. In August 1911 delays were attributed to a miscalculation of the supply of road metal, with supplies arriving from Green Hills and Bluff, and a councillor resigned over the council's refusal to debate the tramway situation. The first two cars arrived in Invercargill on 28 September 1911 and were unloaded the next day. In December 1911 the rails were creeping out along the North Road, with Waihopai bridge expected to be reached by Christmas.

The electric tramway was built to 1,435 mm (4 ft 8 1/2 in) standard gauge, wider than the former horse tramway. Its cars collected electricity from overhead wires, with power generated at the new coal-fired powerhouse in Leven Street.

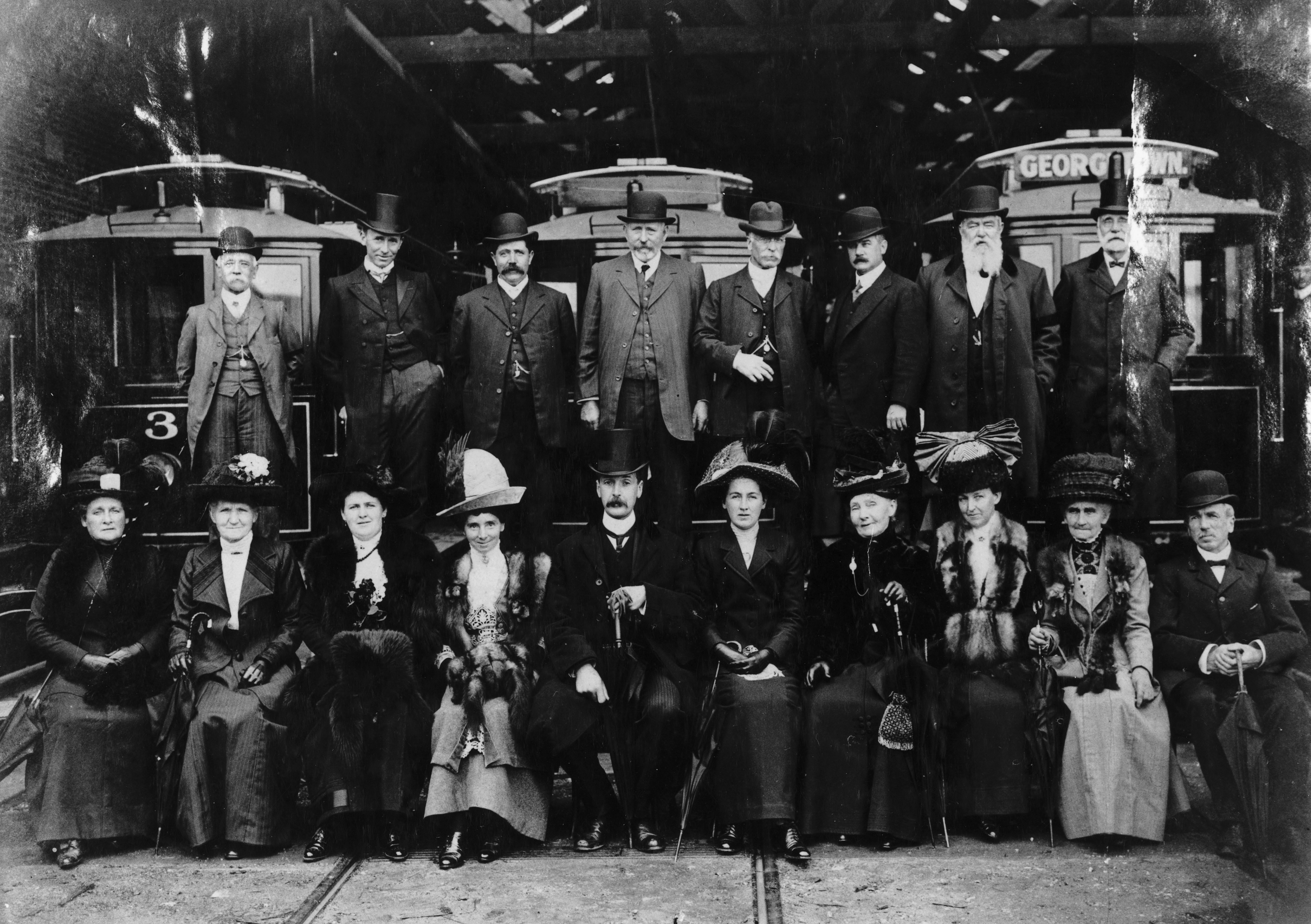
Participants at the opening of the electric tramways in March 1912, with Mayor William A. Ott seated in the centre of the front row

The opening of the Gladstone–Georgetown section on 26 March 1912 was announced in February. The electric tramways officially opened on 26 March 1912. Despite bad weather a large crowd turned out; the opening was reported as a great success, with the cars described as large, roomy and well lit, and the street lighting from the tramway poles singled out as a feature of the system. The inaugural ceremony was held at the Leven Street tram depot, where Mayor William Ott drove the first tram through a ribbon held by the mayoress. Invited guests subsequently travelled over the completed sections of the network, and public services began later that afternoon.

The first completed routes served Gladstone and Georgetown, forming the beginnings of the Waikiwi and Georgetown lines. The opening attracted considerable public interest, with large crowds gathering to ride the new trams. All ten of the original tramcars, built by Boon and Company of Christchurch, were available for the opening.

The first six days of running took £244 6s 9d, and takings in the first weeks averaged about £40 a day with no more than half of the mileage open, against about £50 a day needed to cover expenses.

Construction continued during 1912, with further sections completed towards Waikiwi, North Invercargill and South Invercargill. By 13 May 1912 the overhead wiring of the North Invercargill section had been linked to the Dee Street wiring and the section was expected to be finished within the week. The South Invercargill extension opened on 1 October 1912, completing the city's four principal suburban tramway branches. The first week of operation of the complete system produced receipts of £269, a record for the service.

The council had held a poll in June 1912 on proposals to borrow £15,000 to complete the electric tramway and £10,000 for a power and light plant; both were carried, with little interest shown. In November 1912 the council placed tramway and electric lighting debentures at £99 10s, with a currency of 17 years, interest of 4 per cent and a 1 per cent sinking fund.

=== Operation and development (1912–1935) ===
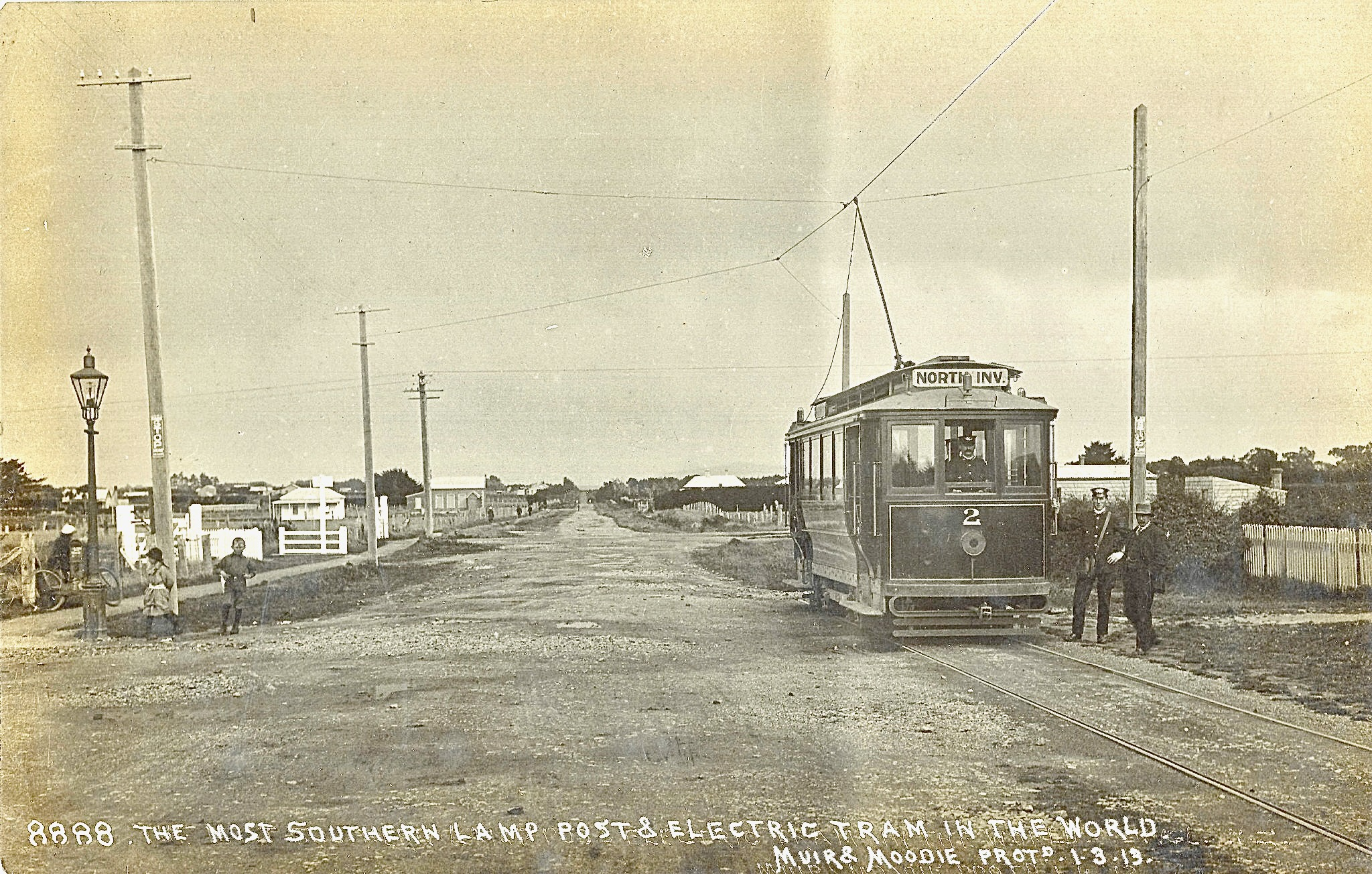
An electric tram in Invercargill, photographed in 1913

The electric tramways connected Invercargill's central business district with its expanding residential suburbs. Although the network comprised four principal suburban branches, services were operated as two through-routes. Route indicators displayed the letters A and B, identifying the principal services across the city.

The undertaking ran at a loss in its early years. The tramways engineer reported that revenue for April to June 1912 was £2,277, and that once interest, sinking fund and depreciation on a capital cost of £90,000 were counted the quarter's loss was about £1,724. For the year ended 31 March 1913 receipts of £13,168 against expenditure of £16,331 were reported, leaving a deficit of £3,162 before an estimated £2,050 of stock in hand was deducted.

The tramways were closely associated with Invercargill's developing municipal electricity supply. The powerhouse, initially constructed to supply the trams, also provided electricity for street lighting and domestic use. The council adopted a plan for these additional services in May 1912. The generating plant continued to operate after the tramways closed and was finally decommissioned in 1956.

The original fleet comprised ten California combination tramcars built by Boon and Company in Christchurch. In 1921, six Birney Safety Cars were imported from the J. G. Brill Company of Philadelphia, United States. The Birneys were designed for economical operation by a single motorman, reducing the staffing requirements of the tramways. The original Boon cars were progressively converted into enclosed saloon cars equipped for one-person operation between 1922 and 1928. The council's proposal to introduce one-man cars had been opposed in December 1919 by the Tramway Employees' Union, which argued that conductors had saved lives and that collecting fares as passengers boarded would be uncomfortable in Southland's climate. By January 1921 the council had decided to order Birneys.

In March 1913 the Women's Christian Temperance Union began a campaign against liquor advertisements on tram tickets, threatening a boycott of the trams; it was also agitating against Sunday trams. Sunday trams were running by then: the previous Sunday's takings were reported as £25.

In January 1918 the trams ran 27,078 car miles with an average of about 6.4 cars in traffic, carrying 238,746 passengers (241,930 in January 1917) and earning £1,470. In December 1918 the tram employees told the council that they would stop work unless a dismissed motorman was reinstated, and expressed dissatisfaction with an offer of a penny an hour more in wages; the dispute was settled within days, when the council agreed to reconsider the reinstatement favourably.

In February 1923 the borough council marked out a safety zone about 75 yards long and 16 yards wide around the tram line opposite the Post Office, so that intending passengers were protected from passing traffic; a new by-law made it an offence for wheeled traffic to travel along or cross the zone.

In October 1924 the Arbitration Court heard a wages dispute between the council and the Tramway Employees' Union. The traffic manager, B. J. Glancefield, said that nine men regularly worked one-man cars and eight worked two-man cars, that the trams were getting close to paying their way through economy and the introduction of one-man cars, and that motor-car competition was considerably affecting the undertaking; the union said that only four cars ran on Sundays and that men worked only two Sundays in seven. In November 1928 a motor car collided head-on with a tram at the intersection of Deveron and Yarrow Streets, and a car from Waikiwi derailed at the points near the brewery; no passengers were hurt.

Patronage rose from about 2.1 million passengers in 1913 to a peak of about 3.6 million in 1927 and fell to about 2.4 million by 1933, while annual revenue peaked at £27,969 in 1922 and had fallen to £18,848 by 1933.

Annual passengers and revenue, 1913–1933
Year	Passengers	Revenue (£)
1913	2,120,740	12,965
1914	2,570,159	15,683
1915	2,577,992	15,752
1916	2,446,386	15,592
1917	2,555,746	16,226
1918	2,698,409	17,048
1919	2,917,041	18,266
1920	3,479,807	21,714
1921	3,383,112	27,136
1922	3,491,178	27,969
1923	3,467,704	26,850
1924	3,469,538	26,826
1925	3,435,524	26,789
1926	3,529,997	27,511
1927	3,598,337	27,793
1928	3,378,153	26,332
1929	3,159,170	24,479
1930	3,014,860	23,453
1931	2,860,487	22,461
1932	2,559,578	20,792
1933	2,386,630	18,848

In June 1933 the council approved, on the motion of Cr A. W. Jones and against the Trading Committee's advice, a three-month trial of penny sections from 20 June 1933, a penny carrying a passenger a little over a mile. The city electrical engineer had estimated that the change would cost about £310 a month on the strength of April's traffic revenue of £1,426. In September 1933 the council declined to extend the trial, which had cost £520 17s 10d plus £15 in advertising, although passengers in August 1933 were 17 per cent more numerous than in August 1932. It voted six to five instead to keep penny sections for holders of concession tickets, at twelve tickets for a shilling, for a further six months, with other fares reverting.

In September 1936 the council deferred for three months a Trading Committee proposal to raise cash fares to twopence a section and concession tickets to nine for a shilling to meet extra costs arising from new legislation; the amendment to hold the question over was carried on the mayor's casting vote after a five-all tie. In March 1937 passengers fell to 185,501 from 214,731 a year earlier, a drop councillors attributed to the infantile paralysis epidemic; traffic revenue for 1936–37 was £19,460 against £18,744 the year before.

=== Decline and closure (1935–1952) ===
Replacement of the trams by buses was examined in the mid-1930s. A council resolution of 24 September 1935 required the Trading Committee to report on the most suitable transport system for the city, and its report, debated at a three-hour special council meeting on 17 February 1936, recommended no immediate material departure from the existing system, pointing to competition from motor cars, taxis and bicycles and to the system's unpaid loan, then £94,792. The committee estimated that converting the system to trolleybuses would cost about £98,150, and thought a trolleybus extension to North Invercargill and Lindisfarne the most promising addition, though one that would not pay for the time being. At the meeting Cr G. E. T. Dorman argued that diesel buses would be cheaper, but his amendment for a special committee was lost; Cr H. Ritchie said that when the council had run an East Road bus it lost money, whereas a private operator made it pay.

In December 1936 the council received a report from W. H. Mackenzie, manager of the Dunedin City Corporation Tramways. He found the permanent way and rolling stock in good condition and the trams cheap to run because every car was one-man operated, but recommended buses rather than trolleybuses for any extension of services, favouring diesel buses. He estimated that running buses over the existing routes would earn a net profit of £3,233 a year before the standing charges on the tramway loan, and the council referred aspects of the report to its officers for further reports.

Replacement was again under discussion in 1939. In April 1939 the mayor and town clerk reported to the council on talks in Wellington about the procedure for replacing the tramways, saying that the trams were losing about £100 a week. In May 1939 the city council was to apply to the Minister of Public Works for statutory authority to abolish the system; its trading committee was concerned at the transfers from the general account needed to balance the tramway account, and noted that the sleepers and original rails were nearing the end of their useful life. In July 1939 a petition was circulating for a ratepayers' poll on whether the trams should be gradually displaced by buses. In August 1940 Parliament passed a local bill allowing the tramway depreciation fund to be applied to the remaining tramway loan, the member for Invercargill explaining that the council intended eventually to scrap the trams and replace them with buses.

==== Second World War ====
During the Second World War, the tramways became especially important as petrol rationing and shortages of rubber tyres restricted the use of other road vehicles. By January 1942 extra trams had been running over the teatime peak since before Christmas, and the city electrical engineer, A. C. Carman, said that staff shortages and one-man operation made running to timetable difficult at rush hour. A 10-minute service between 4 and 6 pm had been running since 18 December 1941, and the council voted to continue it; December 1941 carried 291,085 passengers, nearly 20 per cent more than December 1940, and the engineer was asked to report on a half-hourly Sunday morning service from 9.30 am to 1 pm. Revenue for the year ended 31 March 1942 was £23,407, compared with £21,613 the year before and £20,735 in 1939–40. June 1942 carried 266,502 passengers against 225,329 in June 1941.

Wartime conditions affected the cars themselves. In July 1941 the trams were being fitted with a white band around the centre of the body so that they were easier to see in the partial blackout. In June 1942 the city council was concerned that the shaded headlights required on the trams were dangerous, and sought authority from the Dominion Lighting Controller to improve them. Trials produced a hood that removed sky glow while giving track vision of 150 to 200 feet, and in July 1942 the council decided to seek the lighting authorities' permission to fit it. In September 1943 the tramway manager said that the trams were getting old and that new parts were hard to obtain. In 1944 motormen were issued with khaki summer shirts and allowed to go without caps on hot days, and the single seats just inside the doorways were removed because passengers sitting there delayed boarding at busy times. From Monday 19 August 1940 posting boxes had been carried on trams leaving the safety zone for all termini at 10 pm, and were cleared when the cars returned to the Post Office at 10.30 pm. By January 1944 the coal-fired powerhouse, which had supplied the trams and the town before the Monowai and Waitaki hydro-electric stations were built, had been restarted because hydro output was barely equal to demand.

==== Post-war closure ====
In March 1945 the tramways manager, A. C. Carman, reported to the council on proposals to scrap the trams. He personally favoured trolleybuses for the main part of the city's transport but recommended an interim change to petrol or diesel buses, estimating that at least 24 buses of 35 seats would be needed to run the existing system, with six more for new services. In May 1945 the council received a letter from the Minister of Works reporting that his department's officers considered the system to have reached the end of its useful life and to need replacing within about two years, favouring trolleybuses with diesel buses for feeder services; the council instructed the town clerk to take the statutory steps preliminary to scrapping the trams. Patronage, which had risen during the war, was by then slipping: the six months to September 1945 carried 1,658,688 passengers against 1,708,993 a year earlier, a fall thought to be partly due to a more liberal petrol ration.

By November 1949 the council was putting to ratepayers a proposal to borrow £140,000 for a fleet of buses to replace the trams. The chairman of its trading committee said that if the loan was rejected the council would have to arrange for private enterprise to provide the city's transport, which would also mean buses.

Tram services were then progressively withdrawn. The Waikiwi service was withdrawn beyond Gladstone in 1947, although trams continued to Hollywood Terrace until March 1951. The Georgetown service closed on 2 July 1951, with the remaining section to Rugby Park continuing until August that year.

In August 1951 the Invercargill Veterinary Services Organisation bought a discarded tram from the council to convert into a cattery. For the general election on 1 September 1951 one of Invercargill's polling booths was a tramcar placed near the terminus of a route that had not been used since a bus service began; the returning officer, W. M. Fraser, believed it was the first time a tram had been used as a polling booth in New Zealand.

The South Invercargill route closed on 31 May 1952. Birney car No. 15 operated the final journey to the southern terminus, attracting large crowds of passengers and souvenir hunters. The car was withdrawn following this journey.

The North Invercargill route was the last remaining line. Its closure on 10 September 1952 brought more than forty years of electric tram operation to an end.

The final farewell involved three tramcars travelling from the North Invercargill terminus to the depot at 7 pm. Among the drivers was tramway inspector A. F. (Archie) Waters, who had been employed as a conductor when the electric system first opened in 1912. Boon car No. 2 is recorded as the final tram, having accumulated approximately 1,041,000 miles (1,680,000 km) during its working life.

The closing celebrations were accompanied by large crowds, with souvenir hunters removing fittings and damaging some tramcars. From 3 pm on 26 March 1912 to the end of services the trams covered 13,971,223 miles (13,971,223 miles (22,500,000 km)). Six of the original Boon cars had each travelled more than one million miles.

Motor buses thereafter provided the city's municipal public transport services.

== Routes ==
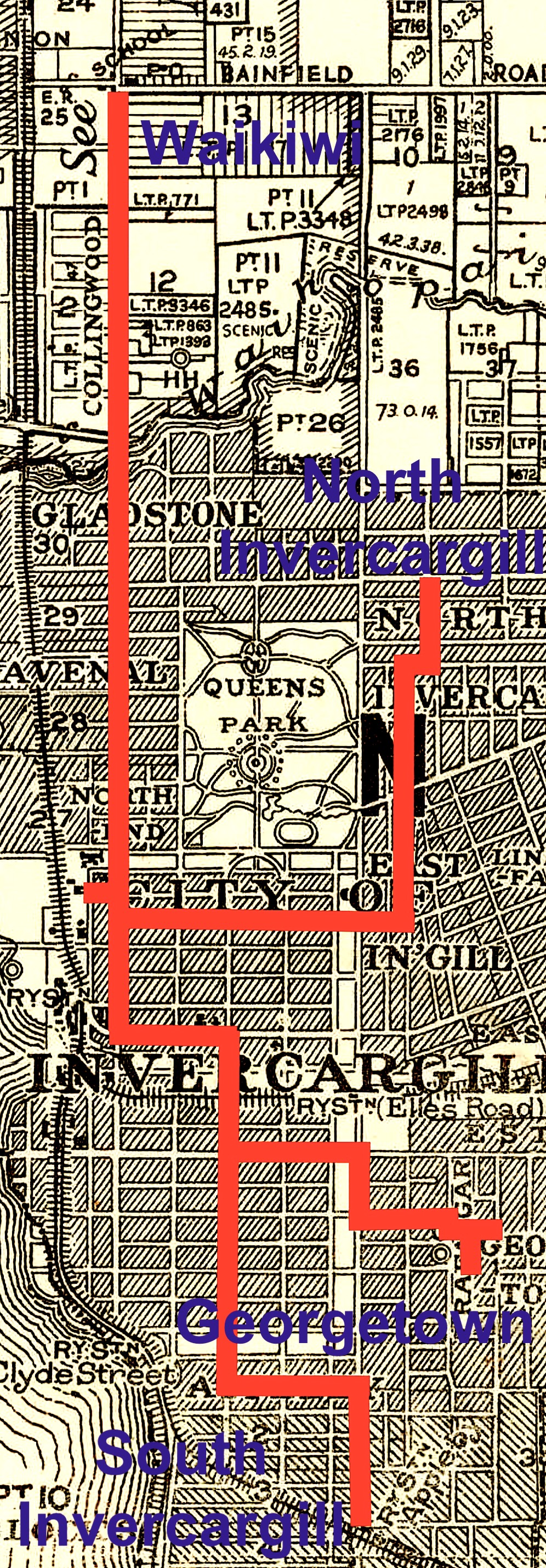
The Invercargill electric tramway network, based on a map updated to August 1946

=== Horse tramways ===
The horse tramway system developed progressively between 1881 and 1884. Its principal northern route ran from central Invercargill along Dee Street and North Road to Waikiwi, while southern and eastern lines provided connections towards Biggar Street and Mary Street. By 1886 fares were quoted from the Post Office to Gladstone, Waikiwi, East Road and Appleby. By 1895 the Conon Street line was apparently out of use, and a correspondent in 1908 described the system as having been reduced to a single line for years.

=== Electric tramways ===
The electric tramway comprised four principal suburban branches, converging on the central streets around the Post Office. By the end of 1912, the completed network exceeded 9 miles (14 km) in length.

The distances from the Post Office to the suburban termini were approximately 2 miles 45 chains (4.1 km) to Waikiwi, 2 miles 6 chains (3.3 km) to North Invercargill, 1 mile 57 chains (2.8 km) to Georgetown, and 2 miles 3 chains (3.3 km) to South Invercargill.

A newspaper in 1939 gave the length of track as about 9½ miles. The principal branches and their closure dates are summarised below.

Branch	Main streets and terminus	Opened	Closed
Waikiwi	From Dee Street along Main North Road to Durham Street, Waikiwi. A connection along Leet Street provided access to the depot.	March 1912; extended during 1912	1947; remaining section to Hollywood Terrace closed March 1951
Georgetown	From Dee Street via Tay, Conon, Tweed, Elles Road South, Ettrick, Nelson, Rodney and Pomona Streets to Centre Street.	26 March 1912	2 July 1951; remaining section to Rugby Park closed August 1951
South Invercargill	From Dee Street via Tay, Conon and Grace Streets and Elles Road South to Tramway Road.	1 October 1912	31 May 1952
North Invercargill	From Dee Street via Yarrow, Mary, Sydney, King and Windsor Streets to Herbert Street.	1912	10 September 1952

The four branches were operated as two through-services, identified by the letters A and B. Later photographs and published descriptions identify Route A as the North–South Invercargill service and Route B as the Georgetown–Waikiwi service.

The South Invercargill terminus at Tramway Road was described as the southernmost terminus of an electric street tramway in the world.

== Rolling stock ==
=== Horse trams ===
The original horse tramway used vehicles imported from the Starbuck company in England. These included small and large single-truck saloon cars with clerestory roofs. A locally constructed double-deck car was added in 1887. In 1897 the cars were reported to be lit by candles.

=== Electric trams ===
The municipal electric tramway operated a fleet of 16 cars, introduced in two groups between 1912 and 1921.

Fleet numbers	Builder	Introduced	Type	Details
1–10	Boon and Company, Christchurch	1912	California combination cars	Single-truck cars with clerestory roofs. Progressively converted into enclosed saloon cars for one-person operation between 1922 and 1928. Withdrawn between 1951 and 1952.
11–12	J. G. Brill Company, Philadelphia, United States	1921	Birney Safety Cars	Single-truck saloon cars imported in sections and assembled in Invercargill. Built with four doors to permit either one-person or two-person operation.
13–16	J. G. Brill Company, Philadelphia, United States	1921	Birney Safety Cars	Single-truck saloon cars imported in sections and assembled in Invercargill. Built with two doors for one-person operation.

The Birney Safety Cars were designed to reduce operating costs while incorporating additional safety features. These included automatic braking linked to a dead-man control, interlocking passenger doors and steps, and trolley retrievers. The cars were unable to move with their passenger doors open.

The two types of Birney car differed in their door arrangements. Cars Nos. 11 and 12 were equipped with four doors, allowing conventional two-person working if required, while Nos. 13–16 had only two doors and were designed exclusively for one-person operation.

The original Boon cars underwent substantial modification during their working lives. Initially built as California combination cars with both enclosed and open passenger sections, they were progressively converted to fully enclosed single-saloon trams. Boon No. 5 was converted in 1922–23 and fitted with air-operated folding doors, automatic steps, a dead-man controller, trolley retrievers and two trolley poles.

== Preservation ==
Restored Invercargill Birney car No. 15 operating in Christchurch in 2014

Three electric tramcar bodies from the Invercargill system have survived, although only one has been restored to operating condition.

=== Boon car No. 5 ===
Boon car No. 5 was built by Boon and Company of Christchurch in 1912 as one of the ten original Invercargill electric tramcars. Originally a California combination car, it was converted to an enclosed saloon for one-person operation in 1922–23.

Following withdrawal, the body was acquired by the Tramway Historical Society for preservation at Ferrymead Heritage Park in Christchurch. Photographs show No. 5 outside the Invercargill depot in October 1951, being transported to Ferrymead, and subsequently stored awaiting restoration.

=== Birney car No. 15 ===
Birney No. 15 was built by the J. G. Brill Company of Philadelphia in 1921 and entered service in Invercargill on 20 December that year. It was withdrawn following its final journey on the South Invercargill route on 31 May 1952.

In January 1965 two Tramway Historical Society members spent ten days searching Invercargill for surviving Birney cars without success. After disposal, the body was used as a sleepout on a farm at Waimatuku, west of Invercargill. It was identified for preservation in 1970 and eventually transported to Ferrymead in December 1985.

A major restoration began in 2009 under the direction of the Tramway Historical Society and Heritage Tramways Trust, with assistance from Christchurch Tramway Ltd. Extensive rebuilding was required because much of the original mechanical and electrical equipment had been removed following withdrawal. Replacement components were obtained from tramway preservation organisations in Australia.

No. 15 made its first trial run at Ferrymead in October 2011. Following further restoration, it entered service on the Christchurch heritage tramway when operations resumed on 27 November 2013. The car was restored in an earlier Invercargill livery, including its gold lettering and decorative municipal crest.

=== Birney car No. 16 ===
The body of Birney No. 16 was also preserved. Following withdrawal in 1951, the tram was sold to Ward Beer of the Southland Acclimatisation Society and taken to Te Anau, where it was converted into a sleepout.

In 1965, the body was sold to the MacDonald family and moved to Davaar Station near The Key, where it remained for approximately fifty years. Its existence was brought to the attention of tramway preservationists in 2015, and arrangements were made for its return to Invercargill.

The MacDonald family donated the tram to Bill Richardson Transport World, and the body returned to Invercargill on 3 April 2016. At the time, the museum announced plans for its restoration.

== Surviving infrastructure ==
The former electric tramway complex in Leven Street survives as a group of associated historic buildings, comprising the tram barn, powerhouse and municipal electricity offices. All three were constructed during the establishment of the municipal electric tramway between 1911 and 1912.

The surviving buildings include:

- Tram Barn (Former): The former tram depot at 90 Leven Street, listed as a Category 2 historic place by Heritage New Zealand in 1983.
- The Powerhouse: The former coal-fired electricity generating station at 98 Leven Street, constructed to supply the electric tramways and subsequently used for municipal electricity supply. It was listed as a Category 2 historic place in 2001.
- Municipal Electricity Building: The former tramway administration offices, subsequently extended during the 1920s to accommodate the expanding municipal electricity operation. The building is also listed as a Category 2 historic place.

The former administration building retains a number of original internal features, including strongrooms, fireproof doors and parts of the former conductors' facilities. Its later additions included a second storey and expanded office accommodation.

Heritage New Zealand has identified the surviving group as an unusually intact example of an early municipal electric tramway complex, retaining the buildings associated with power generation, administration and tram maintenance.

== See also ==
- Trams in New Zealand
- Transport in Invercargill
