= Trams in Napier =

Former tram network in Napier, New Zealand

Napier tramway
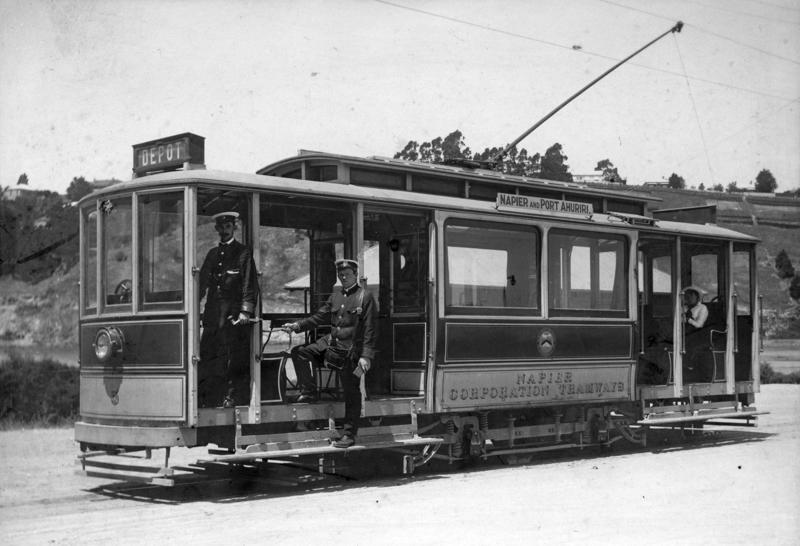

Overview
- Locale: Napier, New Zealand
- Transit type: Tram

Operation
- Began operation: 8 September 1913
- Ended operation: 3 February 1931
- Operator: Napier Borough Council

Technical
- Track gauge: 3 ft 6 in (1,067 mm)

The Napier tramway was a municipally owned electric tram system in Napier, New Zealand. It opened on 8 September 1913 between the centre of Napier and Port Ahuriri, and was later extended along Hastings Street towards the railway line to the south, with a short line to the railway station. Services stopped when the system was disorganised by the 1931 Hawke's Bay earthquake on 3 February 1931 and were never resumed. The council debated reinstatement until October 1935, when it agreed to abolish the system. Proposals for lines to Napier South, Hospital Hill and Taradale were discussed for many years, but none was built.

== History ==
=== Background ===
A tramway between Napier and Taradale was mooted in 1886, with a proposed capital of £15,000; a company was formed, but negotiations with the county council came to nothing.

Serious planning began in 1907, when Wellington engineer Frederick Black reported to the borough council recommending a combined electricity and tramway scheme to reduce construction and operating costs; Black became the borough's consulting engineer. In December 1908 representatives of the borough council, the Taradale Town Board and the county council met to discuss the proposed electric trams. The proposal to go to ratepayers covered only a service between Napier and the port, although Taradale residents wanted an extension, and it was reported that Black's original report had suggested that Taradale property owners contribute £15,000 if a Taradale section were built.

Ratepayers approved a programme of loans in about 1910, of which £35,000 was earmarked for electric tramways and lighting. When tenders were received in 1912 the money available proved insufficient, and a further £10,000 loan was proposed amid calls to substitute motor buses. The extra loan was carried at a poll on 17 April 1912 by 568 votes to 381, and on 26 April the council accepted tenders from Greenshields and Co. (permanent way, road and sewer alterations, overhead work and supply mains, about £30,740), Turnbull and Jones (power station, car shed and repair shop, about £13,500) and the Brush Electrical Company (rolling stock, about £4,817). Opposition continued: in early 1913 a public meeting was called by nine citizens to consider rescinding the contracts, citing the apparent success of motor buses elsewhere in Hawke's Bay.

=== Construction and opening ===
The first sod was turned by the mayor, John Vigor Brown, on 6 March 1913. A trial run to Port Ahuriri with car 3 took place on 11 August 1913. The service opened on 8 September 1913, when the mayor addressed a large crowd at the Post Office corner and three crowded cars left for Port Ahuriri. The trams and the electric lighting plant were reported to have cost about £60,000.

The opening of the tramway, September 1913, with Brush car No.4

=== Route ===
The depot and powerhouse were in Faraday Street. The Port Ahuriri line ran from the depot along Thackeray, Dickens and Hastings Streets, then up Shakespeare Road and along Waghorne and Bridge Streets, ending at the start of Hyderabad Road. A shelter, which survives, stood at the corner of Battery Road and Shakespeare Road. The gauge was 3 ft 6 in (1,067 mm). The original line was about 2½ miles (4 km) long, climbing gradients reported to be as steep as 1 in 11½.

A short line along Station Street to the railway station was estimated to cost £1,746 in 1915; a later account dates its opening to 1919. The Hastings Street line towards the south was laid in 1921–22 (see below). In 1931 the system was described as having four miles of track, with the Port Ahuriri service running every ten minutes and two portions of line on the flats.

Trial run of Ahuriri line, August 1913, with Brush car No.3

=== Rolling stock ===
The system opened in 1913 with five cars imported from England, and the fleet eventually grew to nine vehicles, all of which were withdrawn in 1931.

Napier tram fleet
| Car numbers | Builder | Year | Type | Notes |
|---|---|---|---|---|
| 1–5 | Brush Electrical Engineering Company, England | 1913 | Single-truck California combination, clerestory roof | Reportedly delivered complete. |
| 6–7 | Boon and Co., Christchurch | 1915 | Single-truck California combination, clerestory roof | |
| 8–9 | Cousins and Atkin, Auckland | 1923 | Double-truck saloon, clerestory roof | Built on the bodies of Auckland trams 61 and 62 (1907). Later converted to one-man operation. |

In December 1913 ratepayers authorised a £16,000 loan for borough works including additional tramcars. In 1920 the price asked for four new cars was reported to be £20,000, against under £1,400 for each of the existing cars, and in August 1920 the borough electrical engineer was reported to be in touch with an American manufacturer about a lighter steel car of about 7 tons (against 16 tons for the existing cars), worked by one man and costing about £1,000 less; the drawback was that such cars were built for a 4 ft 8 in gauge.

In 1921 the council bought four second-hand cars from Auckland at £350 each, two to be shipped in November and two in December. These were evidently bodies: the bodies of Auckland cars 61 to 63 were sold to Napier that year, together with one body from cars 66 to 69 that was never used.

=== Operations ===
The first fares were one, two and three pence. The first week brought in £239 14s 6d, and the Christmas week of 1913 was reported as a record, with 41,720 passengers and revenue of £287 16s 10d, with all five cars in constant use. In the first six months the system carried 754,912 passengers and earned £4,041 17s 8d, more than the estimate for the first twelve months, and in the year to 31 March 1915 it carried 1,401,137 passengers, with revenue of £9,080 against working expenses of £7,078 11s 3d. Patronage kept growing: 1,820,077 passengers were carried in 1925–26, 29,508 more than the previous year, although revenue fell slightly to £17,565.

In May 1921 a New Zealand-invented stopping-place indicator was trialled on a Napier tram, and the council was to consider fitting it to the fleet. From April 1927 conductors were to sell concession cards on cars that were not heavily loaded. A fare table of uncertain date lists 3d from the depot to Port Bridge, 2d from the depot to Battery Road, and 1d for shorter sections. A later account says the system employed a full-time staff of 30 in 1928, and a 1931 report gives 24. The first manager, J. W. Callaghan, later became a councillor.

=== Hastings Street South and the railway crossing ===
Napier South residents were pressing for a tram line down Hastings Street before construction began, and by November 1913 petitions had led the traffic manager to estimate the cost of continuing the line to the railway crossing at a little over £17,000, including a shelter and three cars. In 1915 the borough engineer estimated £22,211 for a line from Dickens Street to Kinross White Street, including four new cars. Speakers at a protest meeting in 1921 said ratepayers had twice voted loan money for the extension, £14,000 and £20,200.

The obstacle was the railway. In October 1921 the chief engineer of New Zealand Railways told the council that the conditions for taking trams across the line could not be relaxed. Work on the track began on 24 November 1921, from opposite the Caledonian Hotel towards the railway crossing at Todd Street, and a photograph is dated July 1922 as showing the first tram to reach the crossing. In August 1922 the Railways Department rejected a proposal for alarm bells and automatic derailing switches, and in February 1926 the Minister of Railways refused to accept an electric stop in place of a signalman at the crossing, the department requiring trap switches worked with the signals and a signalman on site.

Boon car No.6, the first tram to the railway crossing on Hastings Road in July 1922

Napier South residents held public meetings; one in March 1923 voted 39 to 26 to ask the council to complete the line to Kinross White Street, with other speakers favouring buses or a circular route. In January 1923 the council had asked for information on the cost of trackless trams or electric buses for Napier South, and the question was reopened with the Government in 1929. In April 1929 the general manager of the Railways Department put forward a scheme costing an estimated £900, which he preferred, and in May the mayor moved for estimates of extensions to the Boys' High School and along Vigor Brown Street, of a subway under the railway and of a trackless tram. £18,250 remained from the earlier loan.

=== Other proposed extensions ===
Ratepayers were to be polled in 1914 on three proposed extensions: along Hastings Street, along Milton Road and Napier Terrace to the hospital, and from the depot along Chaucer Road to the hospital. In 1915 the engineer estimated the hospital line via Milton Road at £27,377. In August 1920 the council was considering routes around Vigor Brown Street, to the hospital and to Taradale, and the borough engineer had surveyed levels from the top of Shakespeare Road towards the hospital to decide the best route and whether a tunnel would be needed. Neither Hospital Hill nor Westshore was reached.

==== Taradale ====
In January 1914 about 70 to 80 residents of Greenmeadows and Taradale had signed a petition for a tramway to Napier, and the Taradale Town Board unanimously resolved to move towards building one. The route was disputed: some wanted to follow the Taradale Road, others a new direct road from Kennedy Road. In January 1915 the council discussed a privately promoted scheme by a Mr Eden, but affirmed the direct Kennedy Road route chosen by a conference of local bodies. In August 1920 the council said it wished to poll ratepayers and approved the direct route, but in March 1921 a conference of local bodies decided that the trams should run from Kennedy Road to the main Taradale Road, and the council adopted an alternative route after the Harbour Board could not guarantee that the direct route would be available within ten years. The mayor suggested again in April 1929 that Napier's growth would be towards Taradale.

=== Decline ===
Revenue began falling in the late 1920s. In February 1928 a councillor asked for economies, including one-man operation, and an officer was to inspect one-man cars at New Plymouth, although adapting the existing cars was thought difficult. In August 1928 the council was told that July passengers had fallen from 125,185 in 1927 to 112,993, and revenue from £1,110 to £982; one councillor blamed competition from cars and buses. A private bus company had begun running eleven-seater buses to Ahuriri in 1925. A trial of penny sections was proposed by the mayor in July 1928, but the experiment was abandoned by October 1929 after patronage fell. In the four weeks to 21 July 1930 net revenue was reported as £16 4s 11d, against £19 4s 1d a year earlier.

=== Closure ===
The 1931 earthquake damaged parts of the track, extensively damaged the overhead wiring and badly shook part of the powerhouse. With returns already declining, the commissioners who then administered Napier did not restore the service, and an emergency transport service developed. One later account argued that little damage was done and that the earthquake was an excuse to be rid of the trams. In March 1931 commissioner J. S. Barton said restoration was not being considered; he put the loss at about £100 a week. In May he listed options including resuming the trams, trackless trams, private operation and petrol buses. Port Ahuriri ratepayers asked in June 1932 when the trams would return.

After a petition in 1933 the council set up a committee. The borough engineer estimated reinstatement at £5,070. Barton opposed restoration. On 4 December 1933 the council voted 8–4 to defer reinstatement, the committee noting that under the new Power Board supply agreement the electricity department would have to pay for the tramway's peak load. In February 1934 the mayor said he would investigate trackless trams, and in February 1935 the council rejected a motion for a restoration estimate and a ratepayer poll.

On 7 October 1935 the council agreed to abolish the service, on its solicitors' advice, and in November it proposed to apply for an Order-in-Council authorising discontinuance and removal of equipment. A later account dates the Order to March 1936 and says track remained in the streets until June 1937.

=== Aftermath ===
Old Napier tramcars used for accommodation in the Kennedy Road motor camp in 1938.

In January 1937 it was reported that nine idle trams were to be used as shelters when the borough motor camp, then in George's Drive, was extended. By March 1937 the council had laid out a new camp at Marewa, on the site of the late Charles Kennedy's home, where eight of the trams had been brought into use as bachs, each being fitted with bunks, tables, cupboards and gas lighting. The council hoped to name it the Charles Kennedy Memorial Park. An old tramcar was already serving as a makeshift terminal for East Coast Airways at the Beacons aerodrome by September 1935, and a later account says it became the first airport building. In 1945 the mayor thought the time not opportune for trackless trams, which would have meant buying the existing bus services, and in 1950 the council took no action on a resident's suggestion to reinstate electric trams.

== Surviving remains ==
The tram shelter at the corner of Battery Road and Shakespeare Road is the last surviving passenger-serving structure of the system. A timber-framed building with a Marseilles-tile hipped roof, it retains brackets for connection to the overhead wires and integral toilets. It formerly was decorated with painted figures of commuters and a conductor. A 2022 council report recommended protecting the surrounding area as the Tram Shelter Historic Heritage Precinct.

A bogie from a Napier tram, a Brush 21E without motor for 3 ft 6 in gauge, survives in the collection of the Museum of Transport and Technology (MOTAT). It was converted in 1959 for use as a railway shunter by the Tawa Timber Company (later Robert Holt and Sons) at their Waitane plant in Onekawa, and was donated to the museum in 1981.
