= Trams in Wanganui =

Former electric tramway in Wanganui, New Zealand

Wanganui Corporation Tramways
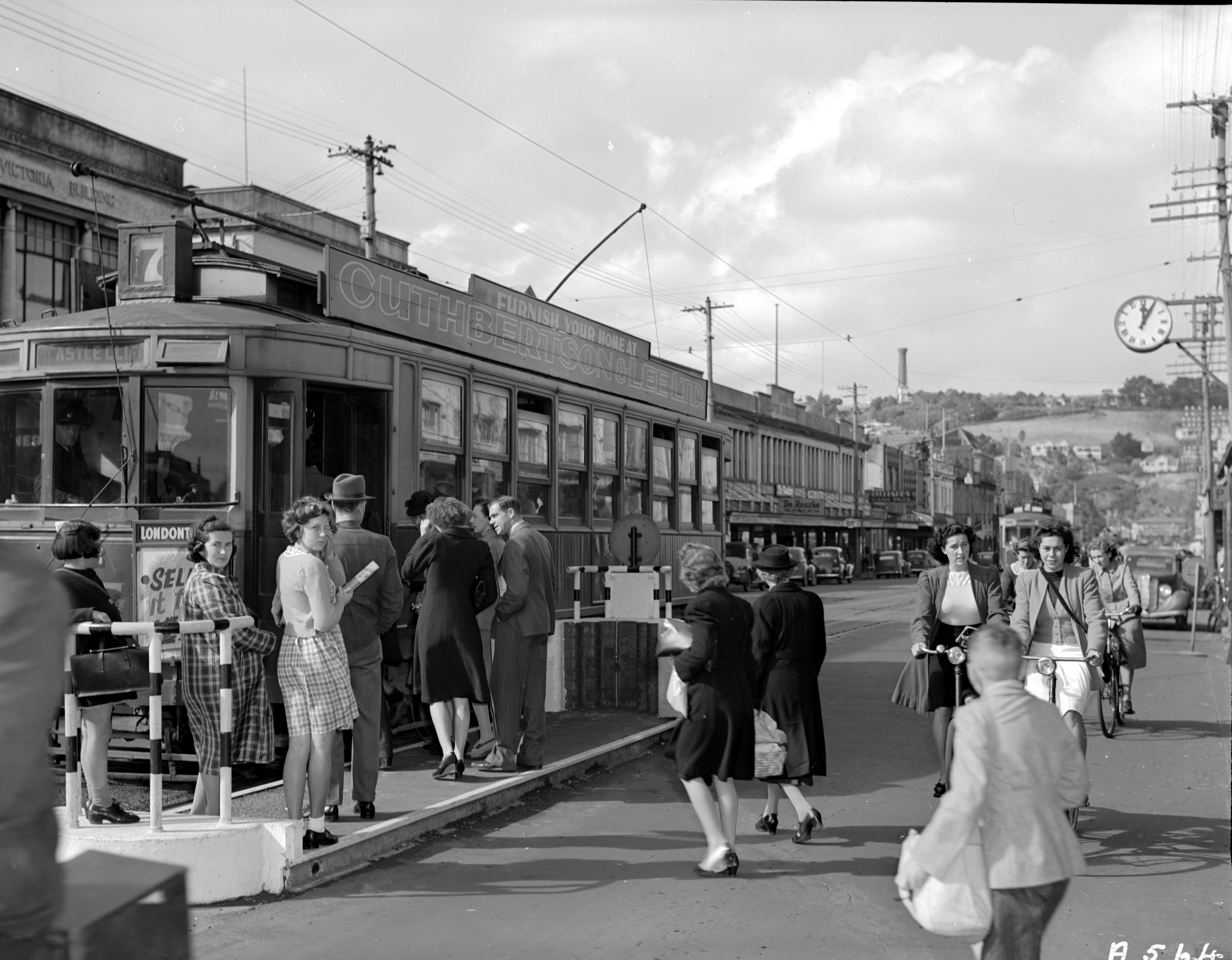
- A tram in Victoria Avenue, about the late 1940s

Overview
- Owner: Wanganui Borough Council (1908–1924); Gonville and Castlecliff Tramway Board (Castlecliff section, to 1924); Wanganui City Council (1924–1950)
- Locale: Wanganui, New Zealand
- Transit type: Tram
- Number of lines: 3 (operated as 7 numbered routes)

Operation
- Began operation: 11 December 1908
- Ended operation: 24 September 1950
- Operator: Wanganui Corporation Tramways
- Number of vehicles: 15 powered trams and 10 trailers (1925)

Technical
- System length: about 17 mi (27 km) (1945)
- Track gauge: 1,435 mm (4 ft 8 1/2 in) standard gauge

Wanganui Corporation Tramways was a municipal standard-gauge electric tramway in Wanganui (now Whanganui), New Zealand, which operated from 11 December 1908 until 24 September 1950. It was New Zealand's first provincial electric tramway. Built by the Wanganui Borough Council, it served Aramoho, Wanganui East, Gonville and Castlecliff from a depot on Taupo Quay. The tramways department also operated municipal motor buses from 1925. From 1929 the older cars were supplemented by double-truck cars rebuilt from trailers of the closed Takapuna steam tramway in Auckland. The trams were replaced in 1950 by buses run by a privately owned company, Greyhound Buses Ltd.

== History ==
=== Background ===
Public interest in a mechanical transport service to replace horse-drawn buses and cabs emerged about 1903, when the population was about 8,000. The only public links were the government branch railway from Aramoho to the station on Taupo Quay and the private Castlecliff Railway, besides cabs, coaches and horse-drawn "Palace" buses between Aramoho and the post office. Wanganui East had no public transport service.

In June 1905 the Wanganui Herald published a summary of a report by the London consulting engineer Albert E. Battle recommending a steam (coke) tram system, which the former mayor Alexander Hatrick supported. In February 1906 the council decided to ask ratepayers for a £30,000 loan for a steam motor tramway on Battle's recommendation, and on 11 April ratepayers carried the proposal by 581 votes to 332. Electric traction was then preferred. According to one account, the General Electric Company's Auckland engineers offered an electric system for the same sum, the new mayor, C. E. Mackay, favoured electricity, and Hatrick campaigned for steam, offering to meet any annual loss up to £500. In October 1907 ratepayers carried a loan of £45,000 for an electric tram service, at 4½ per cent. The lowest tender was close to £50,000; the specification was reduced, and the contract went to Woolf & Company.

=== Construction and opening ===
Rails came from Britain, and the delivery of sleepers and poles was delayed by a strike in Sydney. In March 1909 the borough's loan was reported as £42,000, covering the power house, buildings, engines, dynamos, cars, poles and more than five miles of line. The power house at the tram barn on Taupo Quay had two 132 bhp suction gas engines, each coupled to a 75 kW dynamo, with one kept as a standby, and provided the first electricity supply in the borough. F. P. Talboys was appointed engineer and manager in August 1908, and the staff totalled 25.

The four opening cars had bodies by Lyons & Company of Wellington on Brush trucks:

- Nos. 1 and 2 were California combination cars
- Nos. 3 and 4 were enclosed saloons.

Two routes ran from Taupo Quay to Aramoho Railway Station, one via Victoria Avenue and Glasgow Street and the other via Guyton, Campbell, Ingestre, Bell and Dublin Streets, rejoining along Somme Parade (then Tongariro Quay) at Calver's Corner; a short line down Guyton and Purnell Streets served the racecourse. The official opening was held at the tram barn at 3 pm on 10 December 1908, and the first revenue car left at 6.50 am the next day. The single fare was 3d. Two Boon & Company combination cars, Nos. 5 and 6, entered service in 1909. In March 1909 four cars were running with two more on order, and the daily running cost was about £23 against takings of about £24.

=== Extensions ===
==== Gonville & Castlecliff ====
The Gonville–Castlecliff line was built jointly by the borough council and the Gonville and Castlecliff Tramway Board, which was formed in December 1908. Ratepayers in the tramway district voted in October 1909 on installing a tram service, preferring the electric system, and in January 1911 they carried a £35,000 loan by 403 votes to 24, with power to be supplied by the borough. The borough extended the Guyton Street line to Heads Road, which required an overbridge across the railway, and the board laid the track from Hospital Corner to Castlecliff, working from the beach end with a small steam locomotive. Two routes ran to Gonville Junction, via Koromiko Road and via Alma Road, and joined at Puriri Street for the run to Rangiora Street at the beach. The first trial run was on 29 May 1912, and a full service to Gonville Junction began about a week later, when the racecourse service was suspended; the extension to Castlecliff was completed in October 1912. Six more Boon & Company combination cars, Nos. 7–12, were ordered. The competing private Castlecliff Railway lost traffic and discontinued passenger services in 1922.

==== Wanganui East ====
In January 1914 the mayor and Talboys visited Gisborne to inspect its Edison battery cars, but judged them unsuited to Wanganui's gradients and heavy traffic. The Dublin Street Bridge, which cost £37,000, opened in 1914 and the first tram crossed it on 3 November, giving Wanganui East a service. Trams ran over the bridge and up Jones Street to Moana, Duncan, Tinirau, Hakeke and Holyoake Streets; service began to Patapu Street, and the line reached Salisbury Avenue beside the Wanganui East railway station in November 1915. In February 1935 the Guyton, Campbell, Ingestre and Bell Street loop was replaced by about 20 chains of new track along Dublin Street from Victoria Avenue to Bell Street, which it was reported would avoid grades and curves and save power. Wanganui East services were cut back to Hakeke Street in mid-1949 because of the state of the track.

==== Aramoho extensions ====
At Aramoho, trams passed under the railway through a subway costing about £4,000, and the extension to Quick Avenue opened in April 1915. It reached a terminus near Aramoho Park and the cemetery in September 1923. The Somme Parade link between the Dublin Street Bridge and Calver's Corner was abandoned in 1926.

==== St John's Hill (proposed) ====
A tramway to St John's Hill was first proposed in 1916 as an £8,000 line to Virginia Lake. In 1923, £10,697 of a £140,000 tramway loan was set aside for it, but at a ratepayers' meeting in May 1924 the Mayor said the tramway should not go ahead while losses were so heavy, and the meeting agreed, with a wish to reconsider later. The scheme was shelved in favour of buses, which began running to St John's Hill and Springvale in August 1925, and the rails and sleepers already bought were used on the Aramoho route.

=== Power supply and the steam motor ===
During the First World War private consumers were connected to the tram barn's power plant, and the load grew beyond what the gas engines could meet; by 1915 there were 12 cars and two trailers over 14 miles of track. The engineer, Talboys, reported repeatedly between 1915 and 1919 that the plant was inadequate and at risk of breakdown. A £23,000 upgrade approved in 1915 was cancelled in late 1919 in favour of £89,000 for a new steam-powered generating system, track extensions and more cars.

Power failures stopped the trams in March 1920, and in July the large gas engine broke down from overload, leaving the system without electricity for about three months. By 1 September the first of two engines obtained from Napier was working. Buses provided a temporary service to Aramoho and Wanganui East, a restricted tram service resumed on 7 September, and full service returned on 11 October. Meanwhile a small steam locomotive hauled two trailers to Castlecliff from 30 July. It was a Baldwin steam tram motor built in 1891 and formerly numbered 100 on the New South Wales Government Tramways, bought second-hand from Sydney for building the Castlecliff line. It was nicknamed "Puffing Billy" and spent the next thirty years in the tram barn.

The new power station, at the corner of Lifferton Street and Taupo Quay, was built in 1922–23 and commissioned on 23 February 1924. The council had debated selling its steam plant to the Wanganui–Rangitikei Electric Power Board in 1922, and in May 1924 the Mayor said steps had been taken to dispose of it. The plant passed to the Board within months of commissioning, ran full-time until 1928, when grid power became available, and its rotary converters continued to supply direct current for the trams. By 1945 the converters were two 600 horsepower machines, with no standby if one failed.

=== City control and management ===
Wanganui borough, Gonville and Castlecliff amalgamated in 1924, and the council took over the whole system, including the tramway board's assets. Talboys remained engineer until 1925, then A. E. Cheal was manager; J. S. L. Deem took over in 1929–30 and held the post until his death in 1933, and L. F. Row became engineer and manager on 1 December 1933. Seven more Boon combination cars (Nos. 16–19 and 23–25) and three trailers were bought from loans in 1921–22. In 1925 the four original cars lost their motors and became trailers, and No. 11 was semi-enclosed as an experiment, leaving 15 trams and 10 trailers. In February 1925 Cheal introduced numbered routes (see Routes).

=== Municipal bus services ===
Municipal buses outside the tram barn, photographed in the 1920s: five Vulcan buses and two Dodges.

The tramways department introduced motor buses on 10 August 1925, its first three buses running to parts of the city the trams did not serve. Further services began to Smithfield and No. 3 Line, to outer Wanganui East on 10 May 1926 and to Durie Hill on 14 June 1926. The fleet included Vulcan and Dodge buses. A council report in May 1926 recorded 186,428 bus passenger journeys since the previous August and receipts exceeding operating costs by approximately £270. In April 1926 the council decided not to extend the tram network further, preferring buses where demand justified a service. Only the St John's Hill route proved financially viable over the longer term, and services to outer Wanganui East and Durie Hill had lapsed by 1929. The Smithfield bus was reinstated on 18 November 1929 as part of revised tram and bus timetables.

=== One-man cars and the Takapuna cars ===
Mounting losses led in March 1927 to a proposal to run one-man cars of the type used at Invercargill and then being installed at Christchurch. In July the chairman of the Tramways Committee, A. E. Halligan, said they were about four months away; the Mayor, W. J. Rogers, recorded his dissent, and the loss on the trams was reported as over £20,000. In 1928 Nos. 1 and 2 were rebuilt as one-man "safety" cars with pay-as-you-enter operation and air-operated doors, re-entering service in July and December 1928; No. 2 was withdrawn in 1935 with a defective body and its equipment went to No. 16, which re-entered service as a one-man car in May 1935. One-man cars were running to Wanganui East by early 1929, when complaints were reported about timekeeping, overcrowding and jolting.

The council also acquired second-hand double-truck trailers from the Takapuna steam tramway on Auckland's North Shore, which closed in April 1927. Built in Auckland by D.S.C. and Cousins & Cousins between 1910 and 1915, they were seen as a cheap basis for larger one-man electric cars. In November 1928 the Takapuna company's liquidator sold six trailers, four to Dunedin and two to Wanganui. The Wanganui pair arrived in January 1929, with freight costing £83 9s 2d. Tramways manager A. E. Cheal considered the bodies sound and the price very low, and estimated that one-man operation saved £1,200 a year in wages. On 4 February 1930 it was reported that the council had decided to buy four more cars from Takapuna at £75 each, when Halligan said one-man cars were the only way to meet the deficiency in tramway revenue. The cars were reported to be old steam-tram vehicles that had run between Milford and Bayswater, and in March 1930 the last of the carriages were reported on Devonport Wharf bound for Wanganui. The cost of the additional cars and their conversion was reported as £4,253. In February 1932 three further carriages were reported to have been sent by rail to Wanganui, bringing the total to nine.

The trailers were rebuilt in Wanganui as one-man cars Nos. 26–34, using motors and electrical equipment from nine withdrawn combination cars, and seated about 48. No. 26 entered service in May 1929, and by October 1932 all nine were in service. They weighed about 17 tons and were later blamed by some for damaging the track foundations.

=== Finances and patronage ===
In July 1929 the council adopted recommendations to cut tram services by about 25 per cent, against an estimated loss that year of £4,000 before £16,000 a year of interest and sinking fund charges. In September the Mayor travelled to Wellington to negotiate for M. Cable, manager of the Wellington tramways, to act as adviser, and a newspaper summary of his report gave the debit for the year to 31 March 1929 as £17,147.

In the year to 31 March 1934 the tramway working account moved from a debit of £2,157 13s 1d a year earlier to a credit of £90 17s 3d, with 1,708,241 passengers carried. The system was the smallest of seven New Zealand electric systems by passengers in 1933–34, with the highest average fare, and in 1938 it was reported to have the lowest revenue per car mile of the seven. By 1947 its revenue per mile of track was reported as less than half that of New Plymouth.

=== Second World War ===
Petrol rationing increased patronage during the war; in the year to March 1944 trams, trailers and buses covered 437,373 miles, with 2,813,181 tram rides. In 1941 tram lighting was darkened to meet emergency lighting regulations, with power switches to be pulled at the control station to halt all trams in an alarm. From August 1942 members of the armed forces in uniform paid a flat 2d fare. Two trams collided head-on in Heads Road on 5 December 1942 during an emergency precautions trial; both motormen were injured. The same corner was reported to have been the site of another collision in November 1937.

=== Decision to replace the trams ===
In November 1945 Row reported that the 17 miles of track were in a deplorable state and that renewing it would cost at least £155,000; he proposed replacing trams with trolleybuses and petrol buses in five stages at about £130,000. Ratepayers voted on a £130,000 loan on 26 March 1947, and rejected it by 1,196 votes to 744. Citizens later voted in a referendum for a privately owned service, and Greyhound Buses Ltd was formed in 1949, with £40,000 to be raised by public subscription. In May 1949 Row told the council that the trams could not be expected to operate safely beyond the end of the year, and in the year to March 1950 tram rides were reported as 1,790,000, down from 2,895,000 in 1945–46.

=== Closure ===
On 16 May 1950 the council decided to replace trams on the Aramoho route beyond Calver's Corner with buses, after Nos. 1 and 16 were withdrawn from the route in early May. Trams stopped running to the outer Aramoho section in May, and the rest of the route closed on 22 July.

The last Wanganui East tram, No. 29, ran on 3 September 1950 in heavy rain; Greyhound's first buses to Wanganui East, Aramoho, St John's Hill and Durie Hill ran from 4 September. The Minister of Transport, W. S. Goosman, formally opened the Greyhound service on 15 September, followed by a procession featuring historic tramway vehicles, including the old steam tram motor No. 100. The locomotive hauled trailers along Victoria Avenue that day and the next morning.

Greyhound was to take over the Gonville and Castlecliff routes on 25 September. The last trams ran to Castlecliff on 24 September 1950: three cars, with the mayor aboard, one returning via Alma Road and two via Koromiko Road. No. 28 was driven by J. M. Kidd, and it was reported that about 4,000 people gathered at Castlecliff and that the tram was derailed once on the way out.

A contemporary retrospective claimed that no passenger had been killed or seriously injured during the tramway's 42 years of operation, although derailments and collisions with other road users had occurred.

=== Disposal ===
New Plymouth City Council negotiated for three double-truck cars. It declined an initial price of £450 each in August 1950, and in November made a firm offer of £100 each plus £150 of spares. In February 1951 New Plymouth decided not to continue. At an auction in December 1950 a tram without wheels sold for £63 and a trailer for £31. Many bodies were sold to private buyers, some becoming sheds and baches, while the mechanical parts went as scrap.

Tram bodies in use as accommodation at the Aramoho Park motor camp, 1933. Godber Collection, Alexander Turnbull Library

Bodies of cars withdrawn in the 1930s were used as holiday cabins at the Aramoho Park motor camp until replaced by new cabins in the early 1950s.

== Routes ==
Route numbers were introduced in February 1925 and shown as near as possible in the same colours as the existing coloured lights. Reports differ on the length of the network, giving it as about 14 miles in 1935 and 17 miles in 1945.

No.	Destination	Via
1	Aramoho Railway Station	Glasgow Street
2	Aramoho terminus (Aramoho Park)	Glasgow Street
3	Wanganui East	Dublin Street
4	Gonville	Koromiko Road
5	Gonville	Alma Road
6	Castlecliff	Koromiko Road
7	Castlecliff	Alma Road

== Rolling stock ==
Nos.	Type	Builder	In service	Notes
1–2	Single-truck California combination	Lyons & Co., Wellington	1908	Trailers 1925; rebuilt as one-man cars 1928; No. 2 scrapped 1935, No. 1 in 1950
3–4	Single-truck saloon (box cars)	Lyons & Co., Wellington	1908	Converted to trailers 1924–25; scrapped March 1932
5–12	Single-truck California combination	Boon & Co., Christchurch	1909–12	Nos. 5, 6 and 9 stripped for Takapuna car parts; No. 7 breakdown car 1931–50; No. 11 semi-enclosed 1925; Nos. 8, 10, 11 and 12 stored at the depot until 1950
13–15	Single-truck convertible trailers (32 seats)	Boon & Co.	1913–16	Aluminium sides
16–19, 23–25	Single-truck California combination	Boon & Co.	1921–23	No. 16 one-man car 1935, scrapped 1950; Nos. 17–19 and 23–25 stripped for Takapuna car parts
20–22	Single-truck convertible trailers (32 seats)	Boon & Co.	1920–22	Nos. 20 and 22 until closure
26–34	Double-truck one-man cars (about 48 seats)	Rebuilt at Wanganui from Takapuna trailers (D.S.C. and Cousins & Cousins, Auckland, 1910–15)	1929–32	All withdrawn September 1950

The former Takapuna trailer numbers of Nos. 26–34 were 10, 9, 2, 8, 1, 7, 4, 5 and 6, and No. 34 is recorded as receiving one-man equipment from Napier tram No. 8. The single-truck cars were nicknamed "Galloping Gerties" and "puddle-jumpers".

== Preservation ==
Several vehicles and structures from the Wanganui tramway have been preserved, in Whanganui and at the Museum of Transport and Technology (MOTAT) in Auckland.

Tram No. 12 inside the tram shed, Whanganui, in 2017

California combination car No. 12 was bought and restored by David Harre and gifted to the people of Whanganui in 2005. It returned to passenger service in 2014 on a short heritage tramway beside the Whanganui River, where, as of 2026, it runs on Sunday afternoons, operated by the Tramways Whanganui Trust.

Combination car No. 8, built by Boon & Co., was later owned by a Gonville family and stored in Wellington, where the Wellington Tramway Preservation Society was rebuilding it in 1965. After further storage at Paekākāriki it returned to Whanganui in December 2007, giving the city a second tram alongside No. 12.

Steam tram motor No. 100 at MOTAT, Auckland, in 2015

At MOTAT, steam tram motor No. 100 is preserved in working order. Built by Baldwin Locomotive Works in 1891 and acquired second-hand from Sydney, it was used in the construction of the Gonville–Castlecliff tramway and took part in the farewell celebrations for Whanganui's tramways in September 1950. Sold for scrap after the closure, it was bought in 1958 by Graham Stewart and Peter Mellor of the Old Time Transport Preservation League. It was transferred to MOTAT in 1971 and subsequently restored to operating condition.

MOTAT also holds California combination car No. 10 and convertible trailer No. 21, both built by Boon & Co. No. 10 entered service on 6 March 1912 and ran until the farewell parade in September 1950, after which its body was sold locally; No. 21, built in 1922, had been retired and sold before the closure. Both were later acquired by three Whanganui enthusiasts, Ron Alexander, Graeme Bennett and Alan Lang, and donated to MOTAT in 1967. As of 2026 No. 10 is in storage awaiting restoration.

Trailer No. 21 had been recovered from use as a garden shed in the Turakina Valley. Restoration began in 1980 but was suspended, before being resumed in 2009. Following an extensive reconstruction, the trailer returned to passenger service on 22 March 2026, operating behind steam tram No. 100 at MOTAT for the first time in more than 75 years.

Two former tram shelters also survive on Somme Parade in Aramoho, where they continue to serve as bus shelters. Dating from the mid-1920s, both are built in the Arts and Crafts style. The larger shelter, at the former Aramoho terminus opposite the cemetery, and a smaller shelter opposite 236 Somme Parade are recorded together in the Whanganui District Council's heritage inventory.

== See also ==
- Trams in New Zealand
- Public transport in the Manawatū-Whanganui Region
