= Trams in Kalgoorlie =

Former transport in Kalgoorlie, Western Australia

Kalgoorlie tramway network
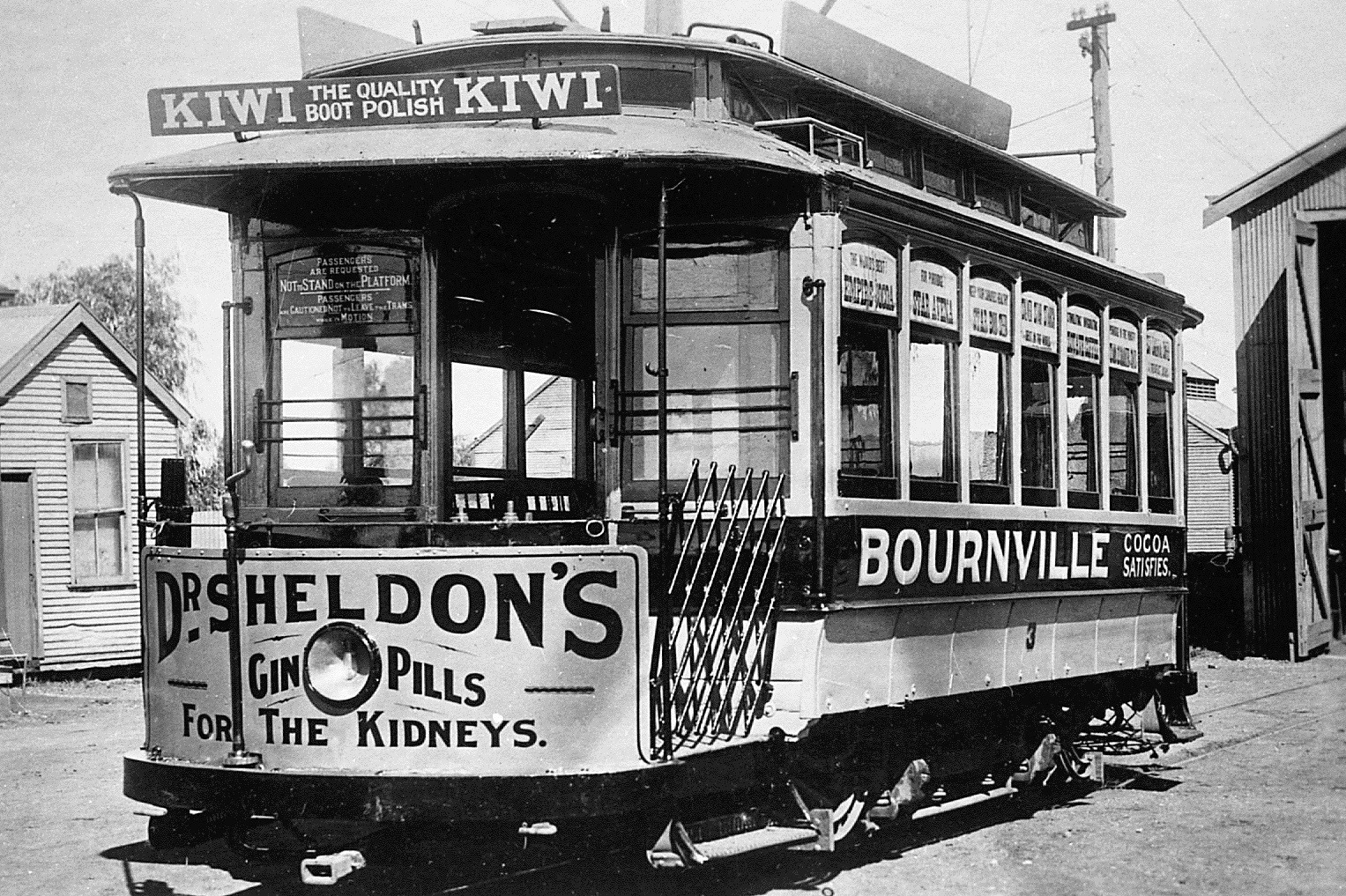
- Tram 3

Operation
- Locale: Kalgoorlie, Western Australia
- Open: 20 May 1902
- Close: 10 March 1952
- Status: Closed

Infrastructure
- Track gauge: 1,067 mm (3 ft 6 in)
- Propulsion system: Electricity
- Electrification: Overhead catenary

Statistics
- Track length (total): 23.87 kilometres

The Kalgoorlie tramway network served the Western Australian city of Kalgoorlie from 1902 until 1952.

== History ==
In 1899 English company Kalgoorlie Electric Tramway Limited was granted a concession to build a tramway in Kalgoorlie. It shared common ownership with Perth Electric Tramways Limited. Construction commenced in February 1902 with the first section between Kalgoorle and Boulder opening on 20 May 1902.

The network was progressively expanded to operate the following routes by 1905:

- between Kalgoorlie and Boulder via
  - Salisbury Road
  - Federal Road
  - Boulder Road
- within Kalgoorlie to
  - Outridge Terrace
  - Lamington Heights via Maritana Street
  - Collins Street
  - Kalgoorlie railway station
  - Hannan Street
  - Kalgoorlie Racecourse
  - South Kalgoorlie
- within Boulder to
  - Kamballie
  - Fimiston
  - Hopkins Street
  - Boulder Racecourse

With the goldfields in decline, some lines closed in the 1920s. After a gold-led revival in the 1930s, the network further contracted in the 1940s. On 31 March 1947 the remainder of the network was taken over by the Eastern Goldfields Transport Board. Tram operations ceased on 10 March 1952.

== Rolling stock ==
The initial rolling stock consisted of fifteen single-truck and ten bogie cars manufactured by JG Brill Company of Philadelphia. The single truck cars were equipped with two 35 hp General Electric motors, and the double-truck cars with four motors of the same capacity. Five of the bogie cars were transferred to Perth in 1903, with five replacements delivered to Kalgoorlie in 1904. Seven trailer cars were purchased at the same time. In the 1930s an additional eight trams were bodied locally by the Kalgoorlie Electric Tramway.

Two of the trams from the network have been preserved by the Perth Electric Tramway Society at its heritage tramway in Whiteman Park, Perth. A third has been preserved by the Sydney Tramway Museum.
