= Rail transport in Azerbaijan =

Azerbaijan
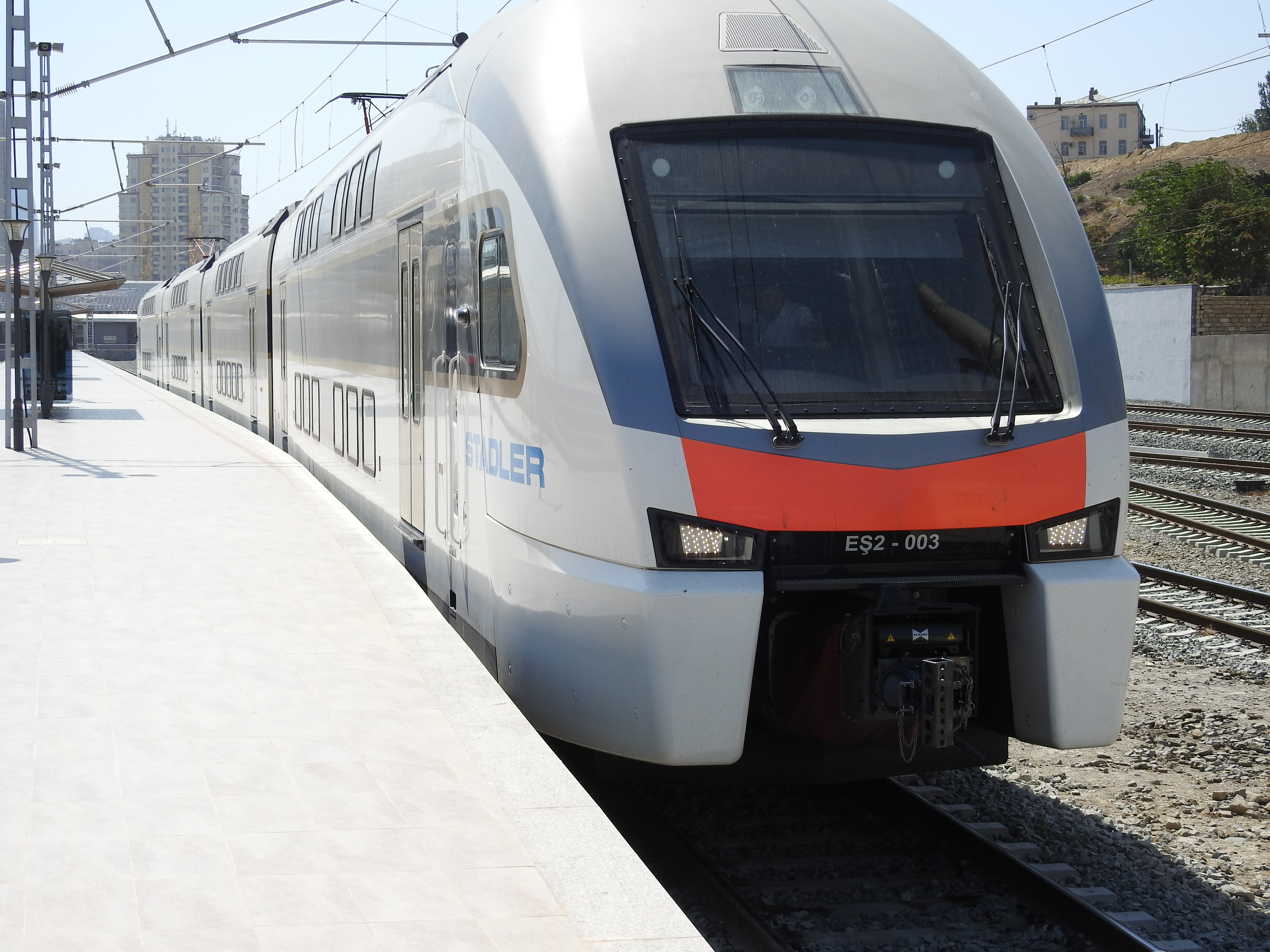
- ES2-003 (1), Baku

Operation
- National railway: Azerbaijan Railways

System length
- Total: 2,932 kilometres (1,822 mi)
- Double track: 815 kilometres (506 mi)
- Electrified: 1,272 kilometres (790 mi)
- Freight only: 810 kilometres (500 mi)

Track gauge
- Main: 1,520 mm (4 ft 11 27/32 in)

Electrification
- 25 kV 50 Hz: Main network

Features
Map
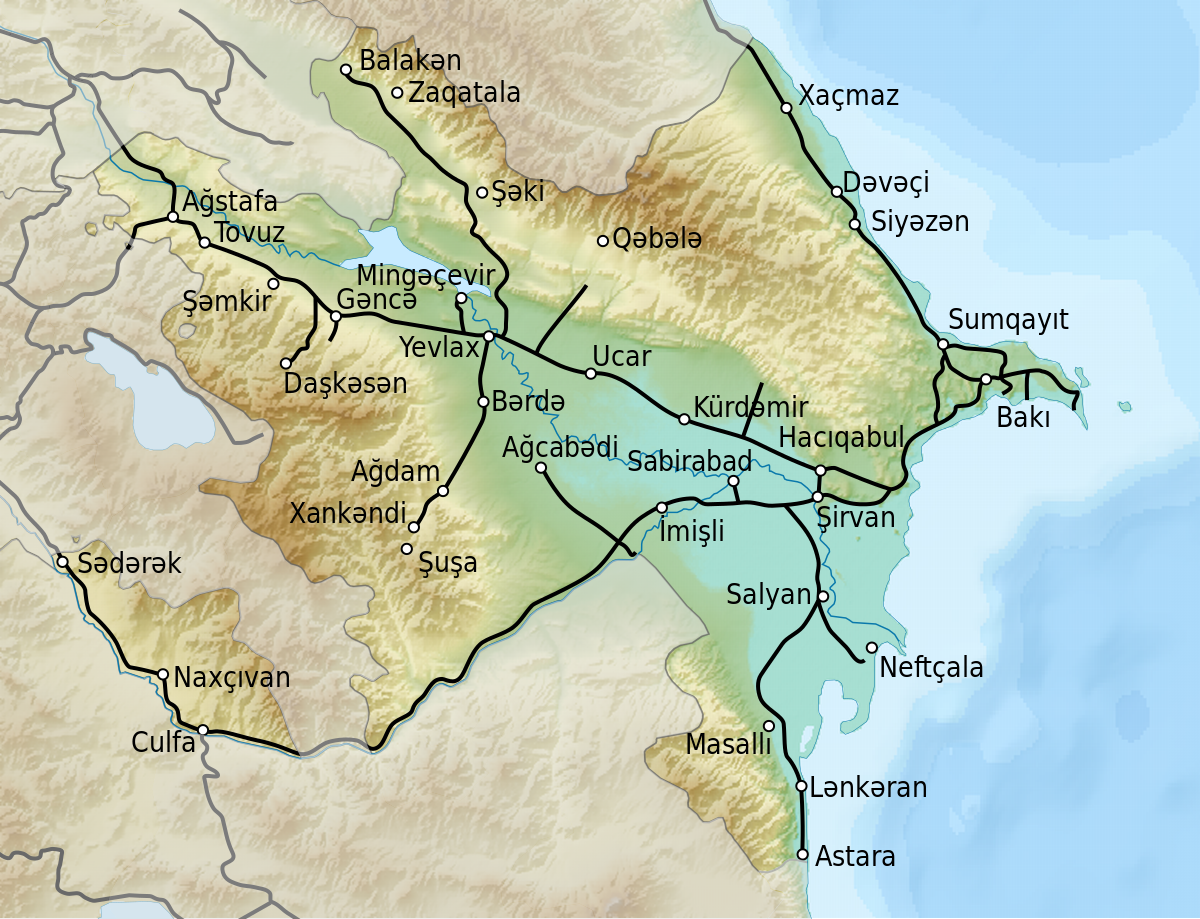

Rail transport in Azerbaijan is operated by the national state-owned railway company Azerbaijan Railways (Azerbaijani: Azərbaycan Dəmir Yolları). The railway network consists of 2,918 km (1,813 mi), its gauge is 1,520 mm (4 ft 11 27/32 in) (Russian broad gauge), 815 km (506 mi) are double track and 1,272 km (790 mi) are electrified at 3 kV (3,000 V) DC.

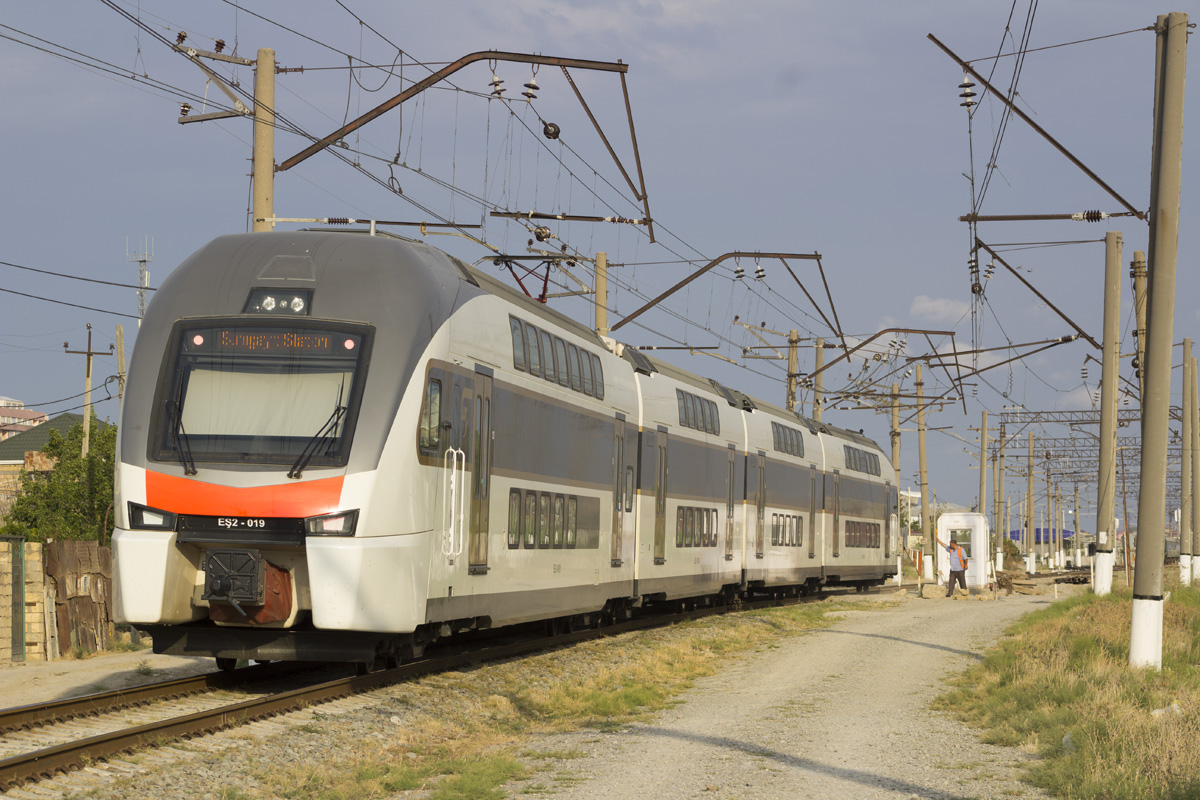
ESh2-019 Stadler electric train heading towards Sumqayıt station

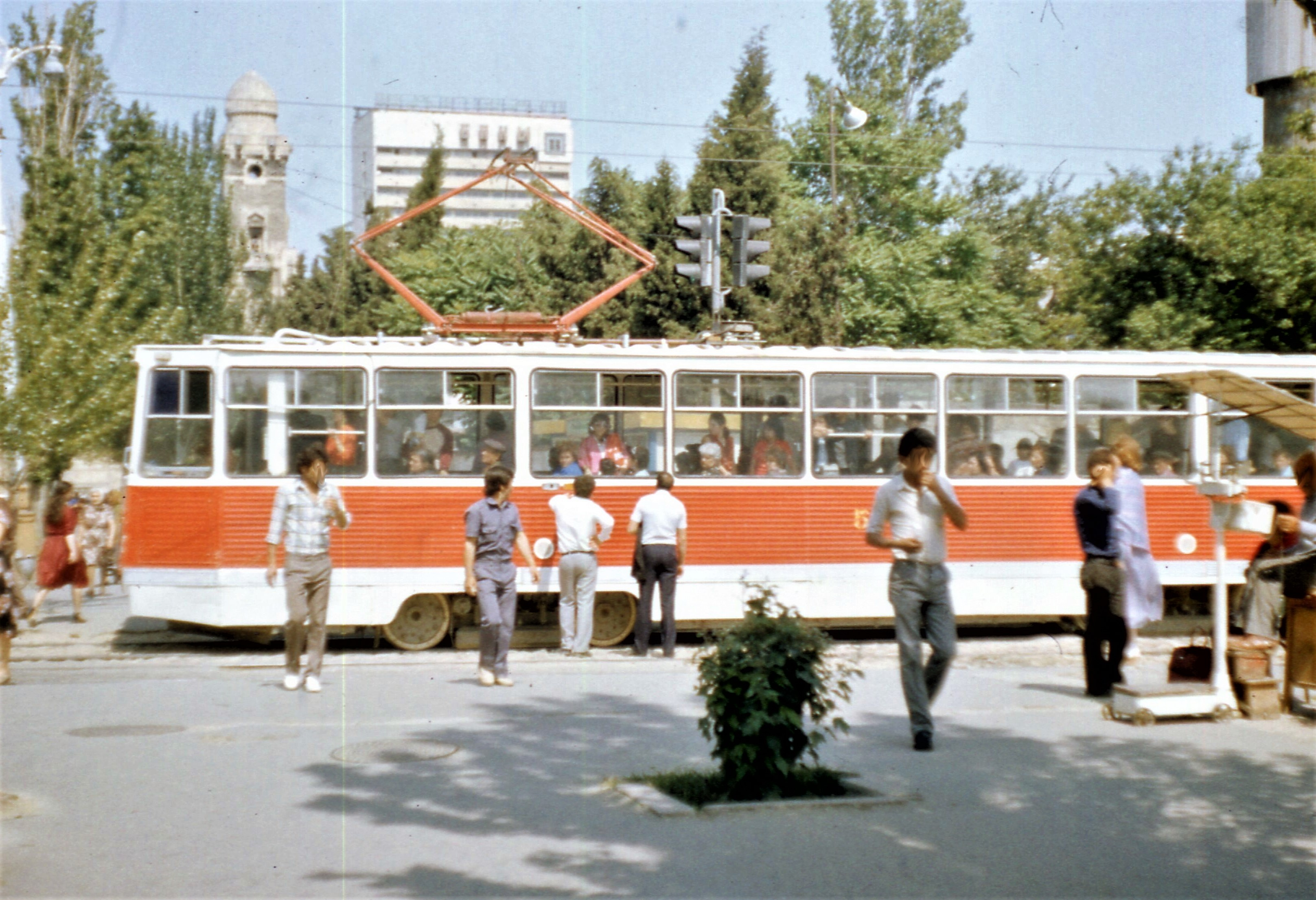
Tram in Baku, 1987

Railways take up 16.7% of Azerbaijan's freight traffic flows. Throughout 2005–2009, a massive railway modernization program was initiated. Expansions costing $795 million were announced in 2012 to respond to the growing demand for rail transport in the country. Stadler Rail and local partner International Railway Distribution LLC announced the formation of a 51:49 joint venture on July 17, 2014.

== History ==
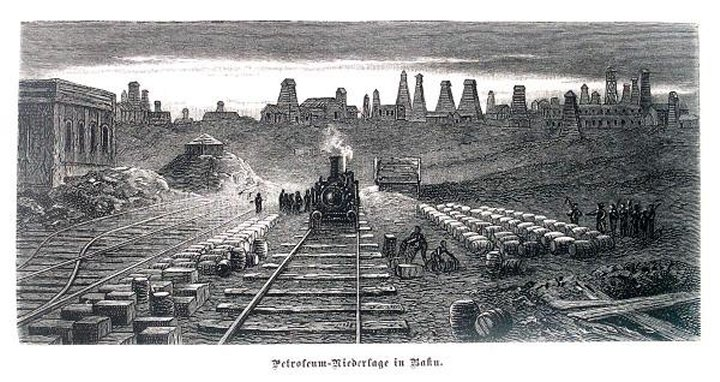
First railway line of Azerbaijan between Sabunçu to Suraxanı in Baku

=== Russian Imperial Railways 1878–1917 ===
The first railway line in Azerbaijan then belonging to the Russian Empire was laid in 1878 and was opened in 1880 within the suburban range of Baku, which led from Sabunçu to Suraxanı, today situated within the city of Baku. The track width corresponded to the Russian 1,520 mm (4 ft 11 27/32 in) gauge.

The first long-distance railway line was opened in 1883, which led from Baku to Tbilisi in Georgia.

In 1900 railway lines were opened which connected Baku via Biləcəri with Derbent and Petrovsk (Makhachkala) in Dagestan and thus connected Azerbaijan with the rest of the Russian Empire (and later the Soviet Union).

In 1908 with an extension of the railway line from Ararat in Armenia to Şərur and Julfa in the Nakhchivan exclave of Azerbaijan, this part of Azerbaijan was connected with Armenia.

Thus the development of the Azerbaijani Railway was for the time being considered final.

=== Soviet Railways 1917–1991 ===
After the collapse of the Russian Empire and the Russian Revolution, the country was transformed into the Soviet Union and the Russian Imperial Railways into the Soviet Railways.

Due to the availability of electricity from the vast water power sources of Azerbaijan, the very early electrification of the railway lines of Azerbaijan began. In 1926 with the electrification with 1.2 kV (1,200 V) direct current of the railway line between Baku and Sabunçu, it became the first electrically operated railway line of the Soviet Union. Later electrifications took place with 3 kV (3,000 V) direct current.

In 1924 the railway line was extended southwards to Ələt and Neftçala.

In 1941 the railway line was extended from Horadiz and Mincivan through Armenia including a railway line extension to Kapan, to Julfa in the Nakhchivan exclave of Azerbaijan. Thus the Nakhchivan exclave of Azerbaijan was finally connected with Azerbaijan proper.

In 1941 the railway line was also extended southwards to Astara, Azerbaijan at the southern border with Iran.

In 1944 the railway line was extended to Kətəlparaq, Ağdam and Stepanakert (Xankəndi).

Until 1991 the railway traffic was operated in Azerbaijan by the Soviet Railway under the supervision of the Soviet Traffic Ministry. The Azerbaijani branch of the Soviet Railways was divided into three departments of Baku, Gəncə and Nakhchivan City.

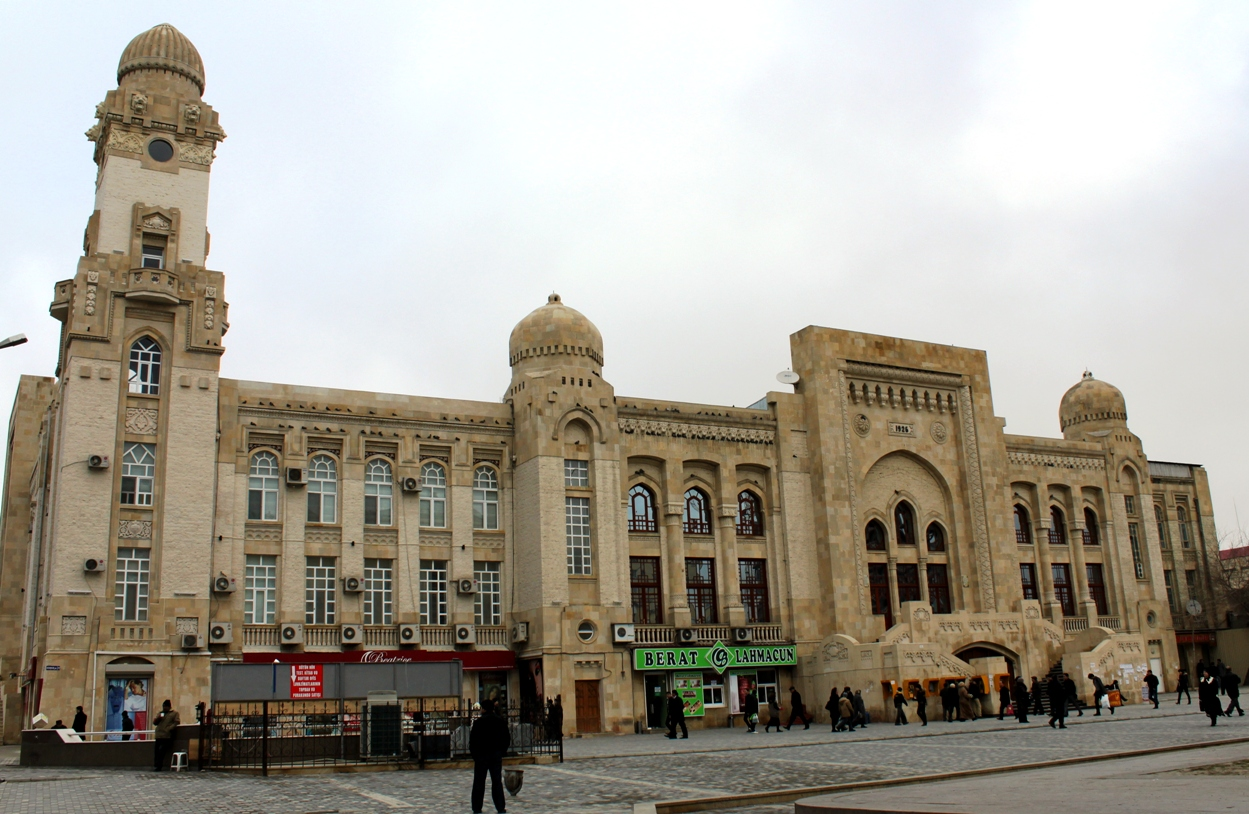
Main building of the Azerbaijan Railways in Baku

=== Azerbaijan Railways (Azərbaycan Dəmir Yolları) 1991– ===
With the independence of the Republic of Azerbaijan in 1991, the Azerbaijan State Railways (Azərbaycan Dövlət Dəmir Yolları) was formed the same year.

=== Azerbaijan Railways CJSC ===
Azerbaijan Railways Closed Joint Stock Company was established by a reorganisation of the Azerbaijan State Railway in 2009. The Company includes Transportation Processes Management Union, Passenger Transportation Production Union, Locomotive Production Union, Carriage Service Production Union, Road Production Union, Power Supply Production Union, Indication and Communication Production Union, Militarised Enforcement Organization, Nakhchivan Department and other enterprises.

The international network serves Russia (Baku–Moscow, Baku–Saint-Petersburg, Baku–Rostow, Baku–Tumen, Baku–Mahachkala), Ukraine (Baku–Kyiv, Baku–Kharkiv), Georgia (Baku–Tbilisi). Domestic routes are Baku–Kocherli–Balaken, Baku–Astara–Horadiz, Baku–Kazakh–Boyuk Kesik, Baku–Agstafa, Baku–Gandja, Baku–Mingechevir, Baku~Gabala and Baku–Astara routes.

== Network ==
So far 2,932 km of rail tracks including 2,117 km of carrier service lines, 810 km of industrial lines have been laid in Azerbaijan. In 1988, during the Nagorno-Karabakh conflict, territories of Azerbaijan with 240 km of rail tracks were occupied by Armenia. The railway link connecting the city Nakhchivan of Azerbaijan with other Azerbaijani regions was broken in 1991.

Azerbaijan Railways serves 176 stations. 2 of them (Bilajari and Shirvan) are completely automated. 12 stations have container yards. Keshle, Ganja and Khirdalan stations are able to supply high cube cargo containers.

1,272 km of the total railway routes are electrified at 3 kV (3,000 V) DC. 1,126 km of railway roads are supplied with full automatic blocks. Just 479 km of railway links are provided with centralized dispatchers. There are no high-speed trains in Azerbaijan.

== Rail links to adjacent countries ==
- Russia: there is a direct Moscow–Baku train which runs 3 times weekly. The train passes through Volgograd, Astrakhan, and Makhachkala, and takes 3 nights. There are also direct trains from some other towns in Russia to Baku.
- Iran: construction of the Astara (Iran) - Astara (Azerbaijan) railway is due to be completed in 2021. The Gazvin-Rasht-Astara railway route will integrate the national rail networks of Azerbaijan, Iran, and Russia. Azerbaijan allocated a preferential loan of $500 million for the construction of the line.
- Georgia and Turkey: the Baku–Tbilisi–Kars railway, connecting Turkey, Georgia, and Azerbaijan, began operating in 2017.

== Urban railways ==
=== Metro ===
Baku is the only city with a metro system, the Baku Metro. Plans to expand the metro are under way, with additional subway systems to be constructed in Azerbaijan's most populated and developed cities.

Construction of the Baku Metro system was commenced in 1951 and completed in 1967. Its opening ceremony was held on November 6, 1967, with the first stretch, 6.5 km long between Baki Soveti and Narimanov.

Presently Baku metro system has a total track length of 40.70 km, with 27 stations on three lines:

- Red line, 32.3 km with 21 stations, an electrical depot
- Green Line, 2.2 km with 2 stations,
- Purple Line, 6.1 km with 4 stations, an electrical depot, administrative building.

The platform length in the stations is 105 m. The platforms allow the use of 5-car trains. Newly opened Purple Line stations are designed with platforms that allow the use of 7-car trains.

=== Stations ===
Stations	Length	Start date
Iceri Seher (Baki Soveti) - Nariman Narimanov	6.5 km	25 November 1967
28 May - Sah Ismail Xatai	2.4 km	22 February 1968
Nariman Narimanov - Ulduz	2.4 km	5 May 1970
Nariman Narimanov - Depot (temporary platform) on depot access route		25 September 1970
Ulduz - Neftchilar	5.1 km	6 November 1972
28 May - Nizami	2.2 km	31 December 1976
Nariman Narimanov - Bakmil	0.7 km	28 March 1979
Nizami - Memar Acami	6.4 km	31 December 1985
Neftchilar - Ahmedli	3 km	28 April 1989
Cefer Cabbarli station - Shah Ismail Xatai	0.5 km	27 October 1993
Ahmedli - Hazi Aslanov	1.4 km	10 December 2002
Memar Acami - Nasimi	1.7 km	9 October 2008
Cefer Cabbarli station - eastern half completed with the shuttle on second track		16 December 2008
Nasimi - Azadlyg Prospekti	1.5 km	30 December 2009
Azadlyg Prospekti - Darnagul	1.7 km	29 June 2011
Memar Acami - Avtovagzal	2 km	19 April 2016
Avtovagzal - 8 Noyabr	1.6 km	29 May 2021
Avtovagzal - Khojasan	2.4 km	23 December 2022

The fare of metro service is 0.40 AZN. It is carried out only by "BakiKart" plastic cards.

=== Commuter ===
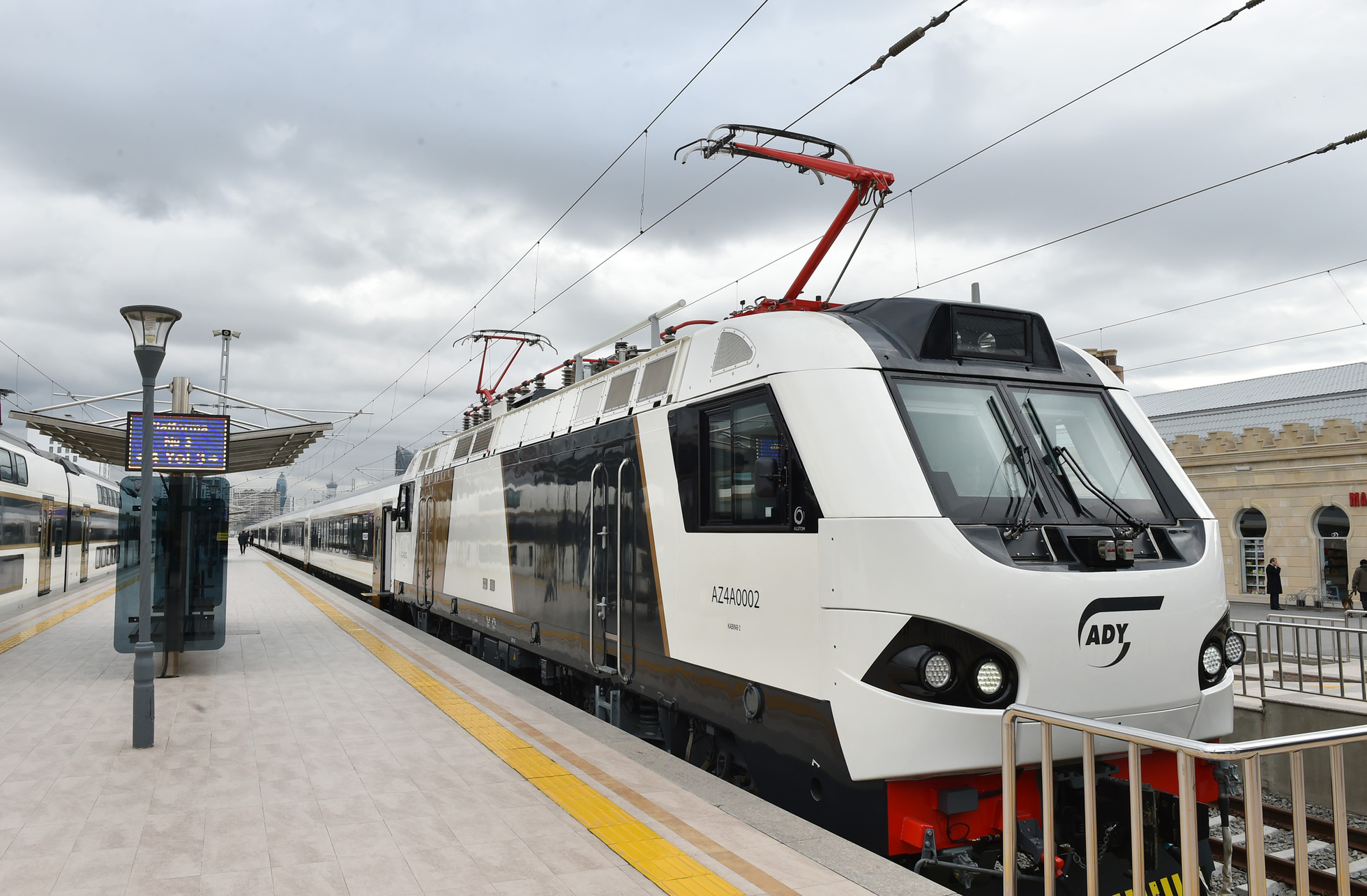
Electric locomotive AZ4A-0002 (Alstom) train with passenger cars manufactured by Stadler at Baku-Passenger railway station, Azerbaijan

In 2019 the Baku suburban railway was launched.

=== Tram ===
There are several tram systems proposed in some cities, listed as follows:

City	System	Electrification	Gauge	Bidirectional traffic	Opened
Baku	Planned			Right- and left-hand traffic#Trains	Proposed since 2012
Ganja	Planned			Right- and left-hand traffic#Trains	Proposed since 2013
Nakhchivan	Planned			Right- and left-hand traffic#Trains	Proposed since 2023
Lachin	Planned			Right- and left-hand traffic#Trains	Proposed since 2023
Agdam	Planned			Right- and left-hand traffic#Trains	Proposed since 2023
Kalbajar	Planned			Right- and left-hand traffic#Trains	Proposed since 2024

== Freight services ==
Azerbaijan is positioning itself as a transportation hub for east–west, north–south for freight trade in the region.

== Baku–Tbilisi–Kars ==
The Baku–Tbilisi–Kars rail link, with a capacity to transport 1 million passengers and 5 million tons of freight a year, connects 3 countries (Azerbaijan, Georgia, and Turkey). At the same time, it is a main freight and passenger link between Europe and China. The BTK Railway will also connect Turkmenistan and Kazakhstan to continental Europe.

Negotiations on the Baku–Tbilisi–Kars railway began in 2005. In 2007 the construction of the railway was commenced. The importance of the project is offering the most cost-effective transportation for the logistics sector that seeks a more economical way of delivering goods to target markets. Initially, the railway will carry nearly 1 million passengers and 6.5 million tons of freight a year. But in the near future freight transportation potential will be up to 50 million tons a year.

On October 30, 2017, an inauguration ceremony for the Baku–Tbilisi–Kars (BTK) railroad was held in Alyat, 70 kilometres (43 mi) southwest of Baku. The European Union called the opening of the railway "a major step in transport interconnections linking the European Union, Turkey, Georgia, Azerbaijan, and Central Asia".

Approximately 504 kilometres (313 mi) of the BTK railway passes through Azerbaijan, with 246 kilometres (153 mi) through Georgia and 79 kilometres (49 mi) through Turkey.

== The North–South Corridor ==
The North–South corridor, with a length of 7,200 kilometres (4,500 mi), is designed to carry more than 20 million tons per year from India, Iran and other Persian Gulf countries to the territory of Russia (the Caspian Sea) and further on to Northern and Western Europe.

The agreement among Russia, Iran, and India on the North–South International Transport Corridor was signed in Saint Petersburg (Russia) in September 2000. Azerbaijan joined the project in 2005.

Through the North–South Corridor route, Northern Europe and Southeast Asia will be connected. Presently Iran carries out construction work on completion of the missing link of the Qazvin–Rasht–Astara road and railway (205 kilometres (127 mi)) including the Rasht–Astara section (164 kilometres (102 mi)).

369 kilometres (229 mi) of bridges and railway lines to link the southern sections to the northern ones will be constructed within the framework of the project.

The Rasht–Astara section of the North–South Corridor route was completed in 2016. The remaining construction of the Qazvin to Rasht rail route is nearing completion.

The current sea route via the frontiers of Western Europe, through the Mediterranean and the Suez Canal, takes 40 days. The North–South Corridor will reduce transport time by half. According to the project, the goods that will be transported via the corridor from India to Russia and Europe will be delivered in 12 days. The annual transit through Azerbaijan will consist of millions of tonnes of freight.

== See also ==
- Azerbaijan Railways
- Baku Metro
- Transport in Azerbaijan
- Trams in Baku
- Trams in Ganja, Azerbaijan
- Trams in Sumqayit
- Rail transport in the Soviet Union
- Zangezur corridor
