= Business continuance volume =

EMC Corporation's term for redundant copies of data in a disk array

In disk arrays, a business continuance volume (BCV) is EMC Corporation's term for an independently addressable copy of a data volume, that uses advanced mirroring technique for business continuity purposes.

== Use ==
BCVs can be detached from the active data storage at a point in time and mounted on non-critical servers to facilitate offline backup or parallel computing. Once offline processes are completed, these BCVs can be either:

- discarded
- used as a source to recover the production data
- re-attached (re-synchronized) to the production data again

== Types ==
There are two types of BCVs:

- A clone BCV is a traditional method, and uses one-to-one separate physical storage (splitable disk mirror)
  - least impact on production performance
  - high cost of the additional storage
  - persistent usage
- A snapshot BCV, that uses copy on write algorithm on the production volume
  - uses only a small additional storage, that only holds the changes made to the production volume
    - lower cost of the additional storage
    - reads and writes impact performance of production storage
  - once snapshot storage fills up, the snapshot becomes invalid and unusable
  - short-term usage

== See also ==
- Operational continuity
- Business Continuity Institute
