= Trolleybuses in Baku =

Baku trolleybus system

Operation
- Locale: Baku, Azerbaijan
- Open: 5 December 1941
- Close: 1 July 2006
- Status: Closed
- Lines: ca. 30 (max)

Statistics
- Route length: 300 km (190 mi) (mi)

The Baku trolleybus system was a system of trolleybuses forming part of the public transport arrangements in Baku, the capital city of Azerbaijan, for about 65 years from 1941.

== History ==
The system's first line was opened on 5 December 1941. It was 7.5 km (4.7 mi) long, and was operated by 15 trolleybuses. Most of the system's development took place in the 1960s and 1970s; by the first half of the latter decade, the system had 10 lines.

In the late 1988s, the system reached its maximum length of 300 km (190 mi), with 32 routes. It also encompassed some neighbouring localities. In 1991, it still had 32 routes, and 110 km (68 mi) of overhead wires.

Despite the fact that the system was intensively developed up to 1990, it lost popularity among the population, due to its lower quality of service compared with road transport, the Baku Metro and even the Baku tramway network. In particular, the system experienced frequent power outages and trolley pole dewirings. Most of the trolleybus lines were unprofitable due to weak demand; only 6 of the 32 routes were busy and profitable.

Following the collapse of the Soviet Union, the trolleybus system was not given a chance to adapt to a market economy and become profitable. The last operating route, no 16, was closed on 1 July 2006, and dismantled soon afterwards.

== Fleet ==
The first trolleybus models used on the system are not known. The first known models were MTB-82s. In the 1960s, a number of Baku-built BTL-62 vehicles joined the fleet.

From the late 1960s, the system was operated by Škoda 9Trs, from 1979 there were Škoda 9TrHs, and from 1982, Škoda 14Trs.

During the 1980s, the fleet was also augmented by Soviet-built ZiU-9s.

== Depots ==
The system had two depots. The original depot was at Darnagul (Дарнагюле), and a second one was opened in about 1987, when the original depot became unable to accommodate the system's growing fleet.

== See also ==
- History of Baku
- List of trolleybus systems
- Transport in Baku
- Trolleybuses in former Soviet Union countries
