= Azerbaijan Railways =

National railway company of Azerbaijan

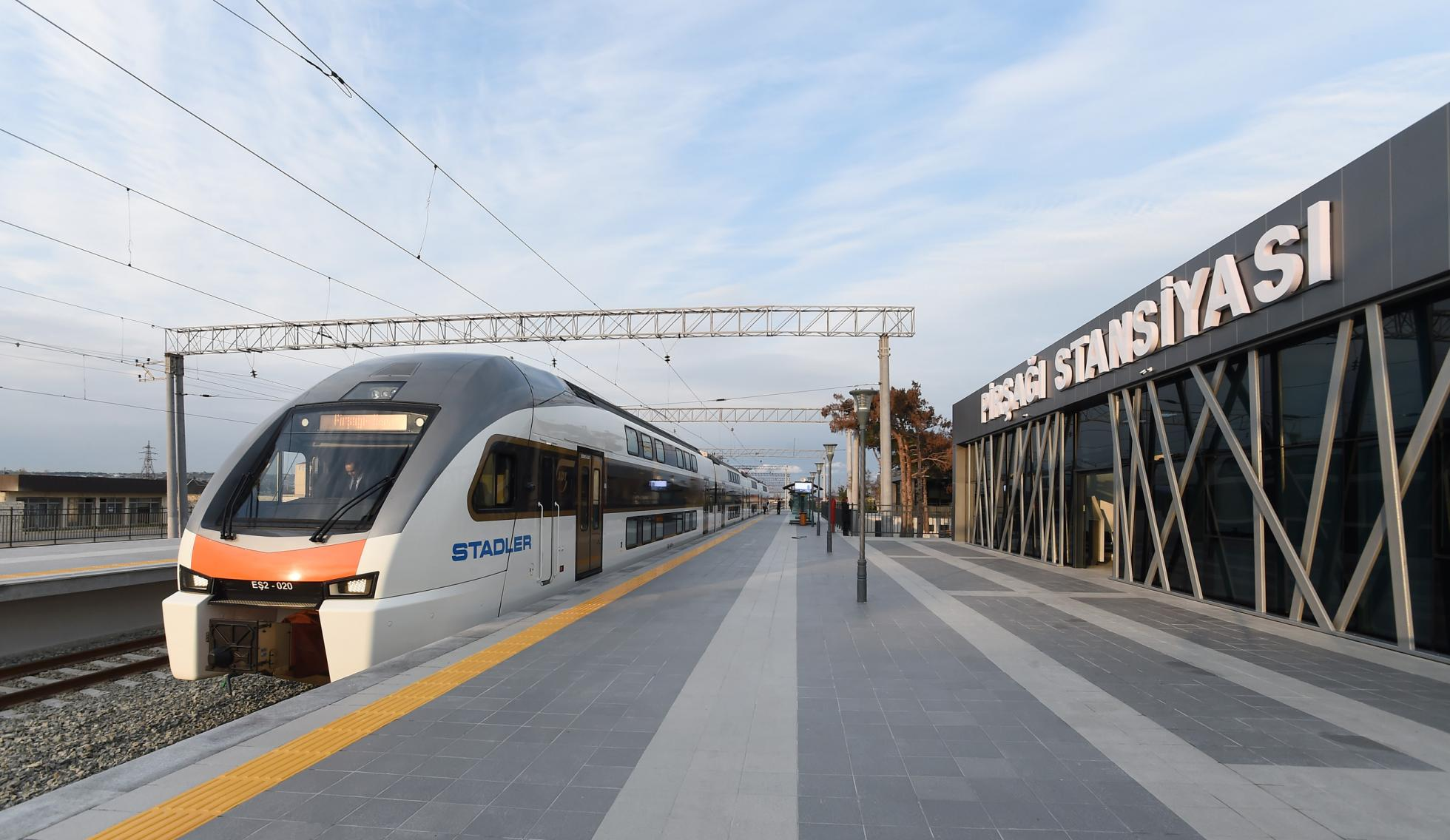
- Type: Closed joint-stock company
- Industry: Transport
- Founded: 2009; 17 years ago
- Headquarters: Baku, Azerbaijan
- Area served: Azerbaijan, CIS Countries, Eastern Europe, Asia
- Key people: Rovshan Rustamov
- Services: Rail Transport
- Operating income: ▼ ₼ 323,372,000 (2024)
- Owner: Republic of Azerbaijan, (Parent Company AZCON Holding)
- Number of employees: +17,000
- Subsidiaries: ADY Express; ADY Container
- Website: ady.az

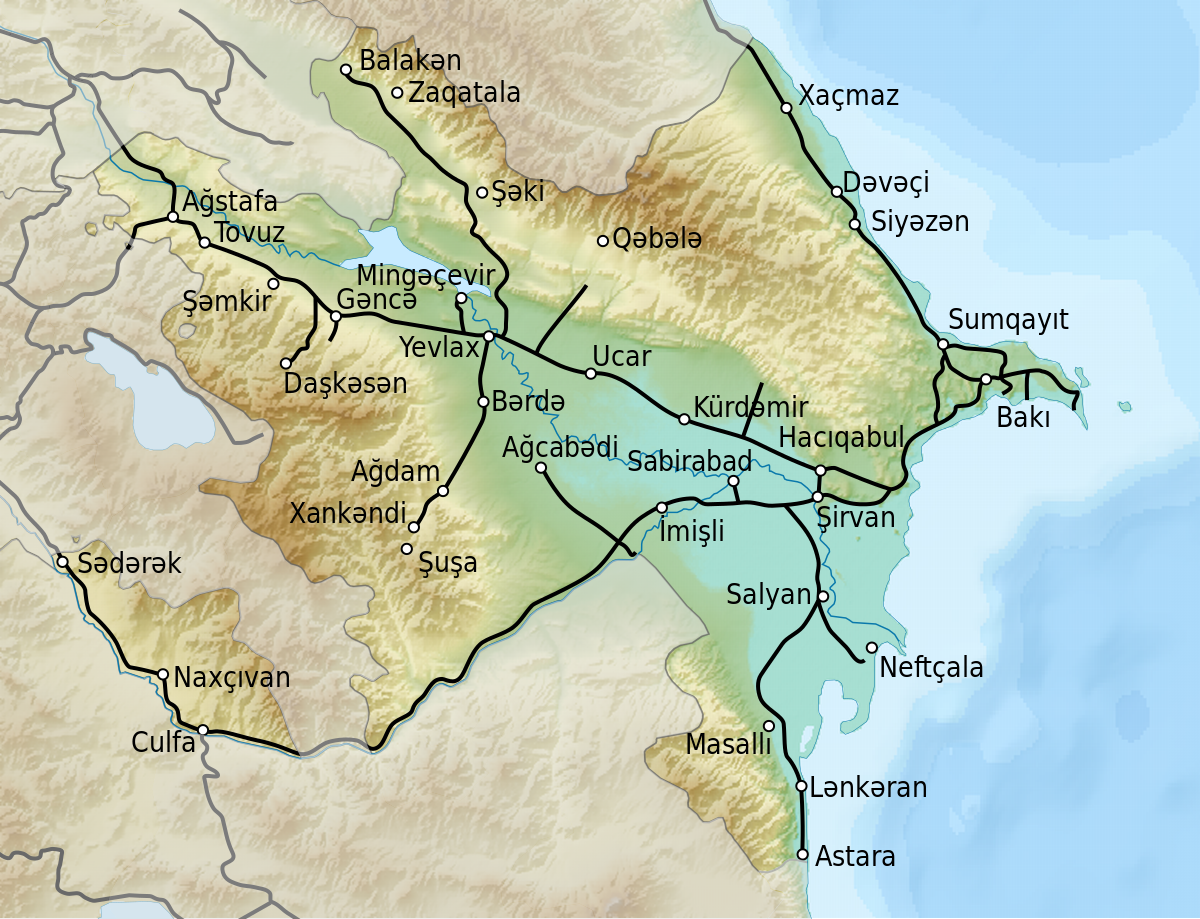
- Azerbaijan railway map 2023

Overview
- Dates of operation: 1991–current
- Predecessor: Russian Imperial Railways 1878–1917; Soviet Railways 1917–1991

Technical
- Track gauge: 1,520 mm (4 ft 11 27/32 in)
- Electrification: 3 kV (3,000 V) DC
- Length: 2,918 km (1,813 mi)

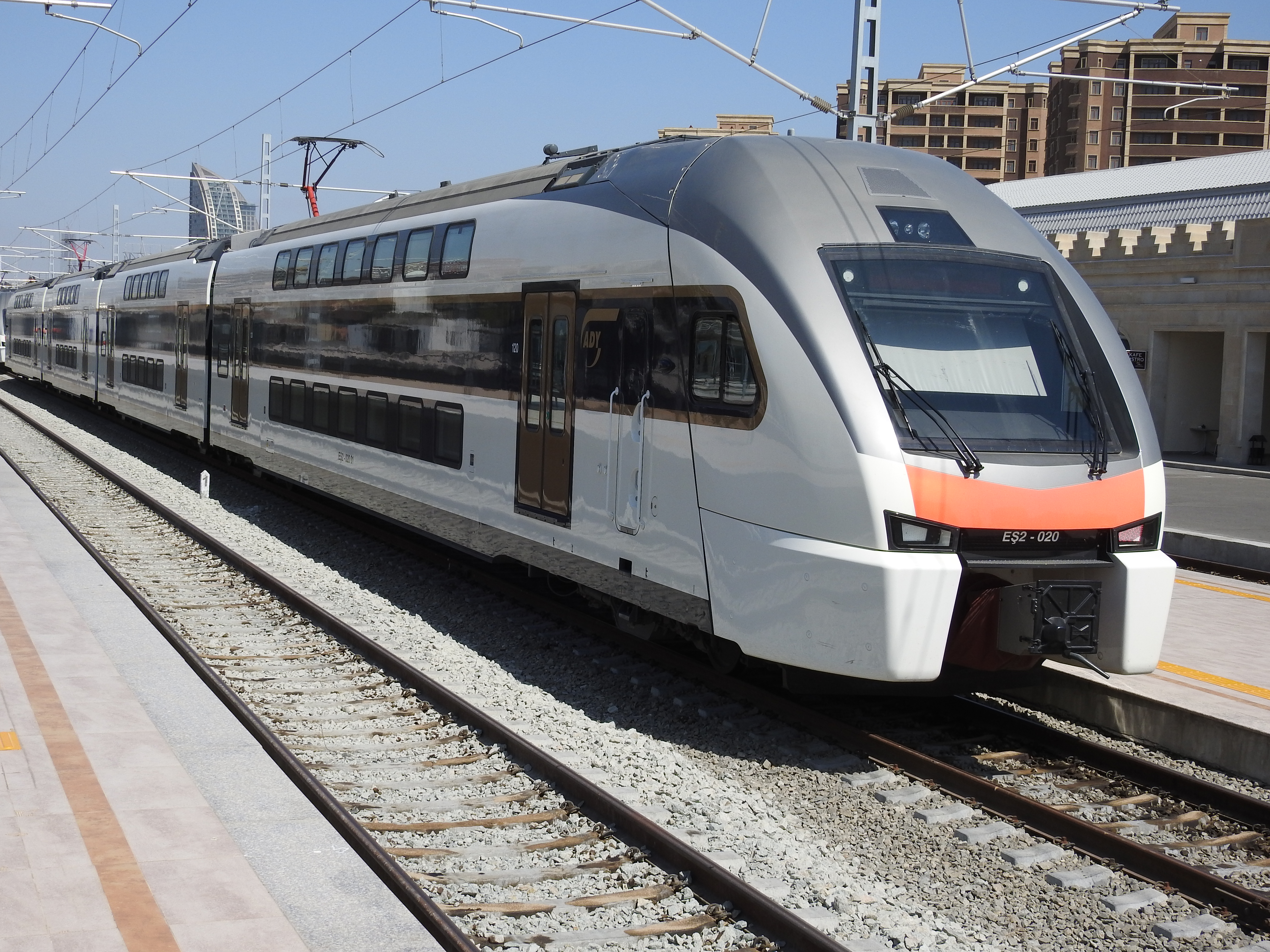
Stadler ESh-020 electric multiple unit at Baku

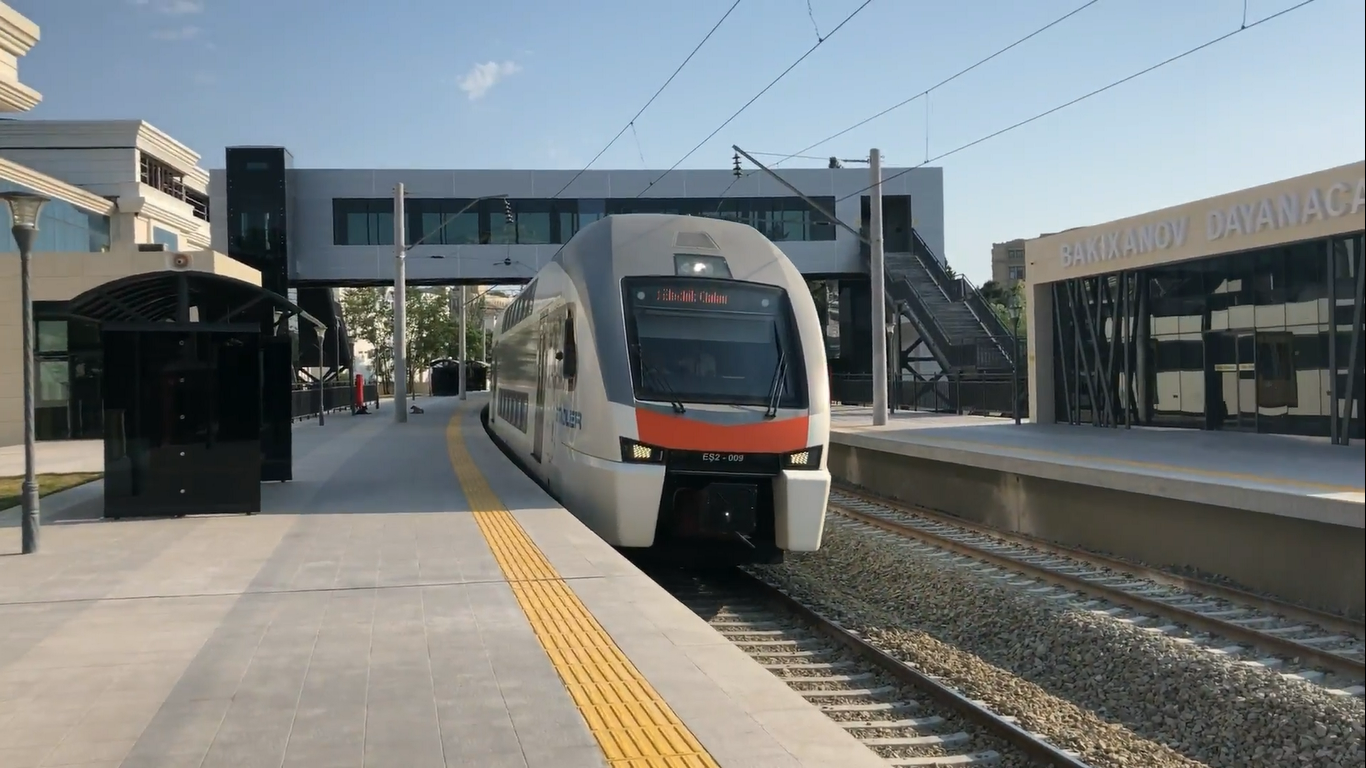
Stadler ESh2 at Bakikhanov Station

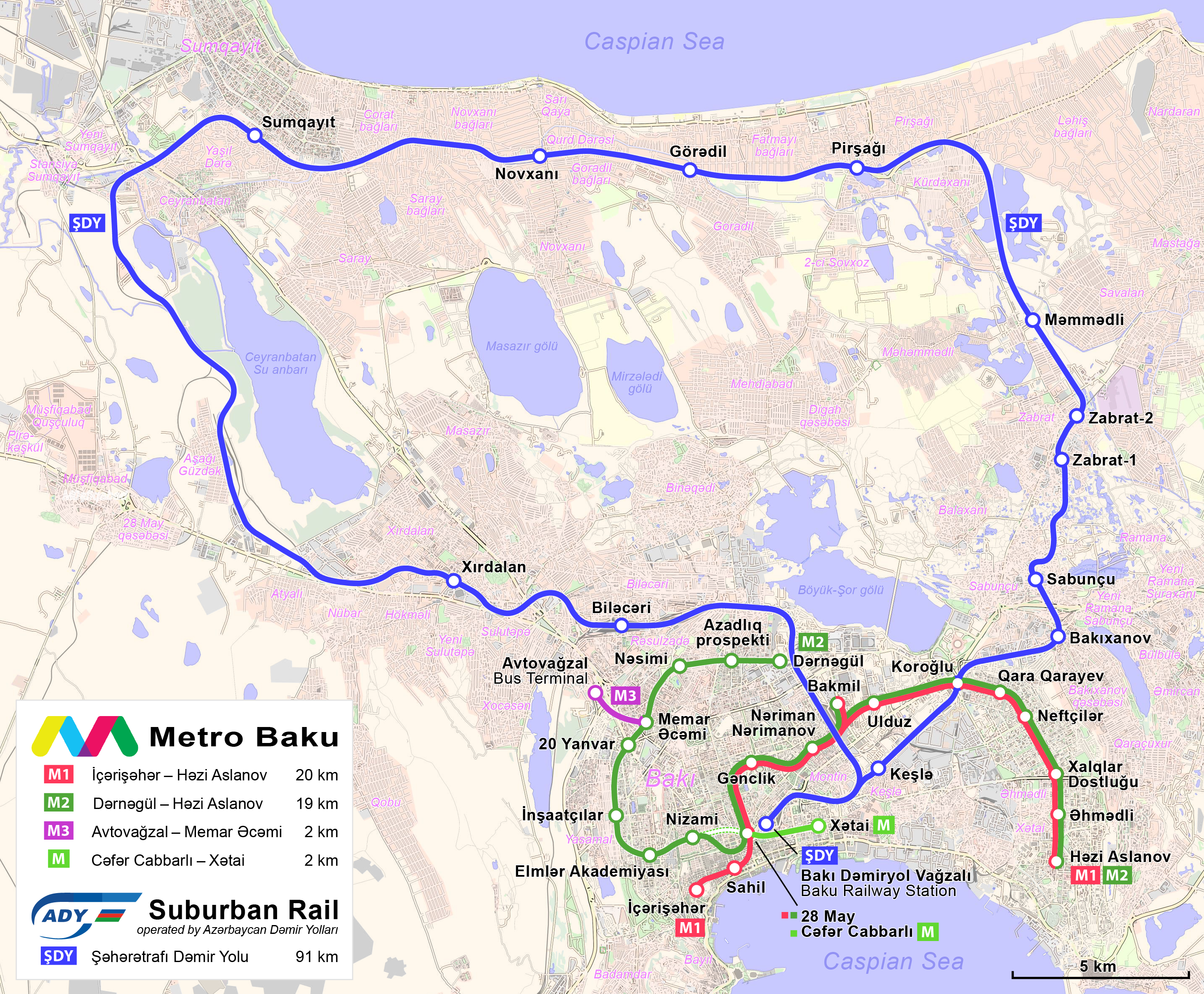
Baku suburban railway and metro map

Azerbaijan Railways (Azerbaijani: Azərbaycan Dəmir Yolları) is the national state-owned rail transport operator in the Republic of Azerbaijan. The 2,918 km (1,813 mi), 1,520 mm (4 ft 11 27/32 in) gauge network is electrified at 3 kV (3,000 V) DC. The headquarters of the Azerbaijan Railways is in the capital Baku.

Following the collapse of the Soviet Union in 1991, its railway system broke up into national railway systems of various former Soviet republics, from which the independent Republic of Azerbaijan and the Azerbaijan Railways both emerged in that year.

The first railway line in Azerbaijan was laid in 1878 and was opened in 1880 in the suburbs outside Baku.

The railway has 176 stations, 2 of which Biləcəri (in Baku) and Şirvan are completely automated; 12 stations have container courts with adapted mechanisms and machines, and 3 stations – Keşlə (in Baku), Gəncə and Xırdalan can supply high cargo containers.

Along with the Kars–Tbilisi–Baku railway, a regional rail link project that directly connects Turkey, Georgia and Azerbaijan since 2017, the railway lines are being modernized in Azerbaijan with new fast rail stock to replace the old rail stock.

== History ==
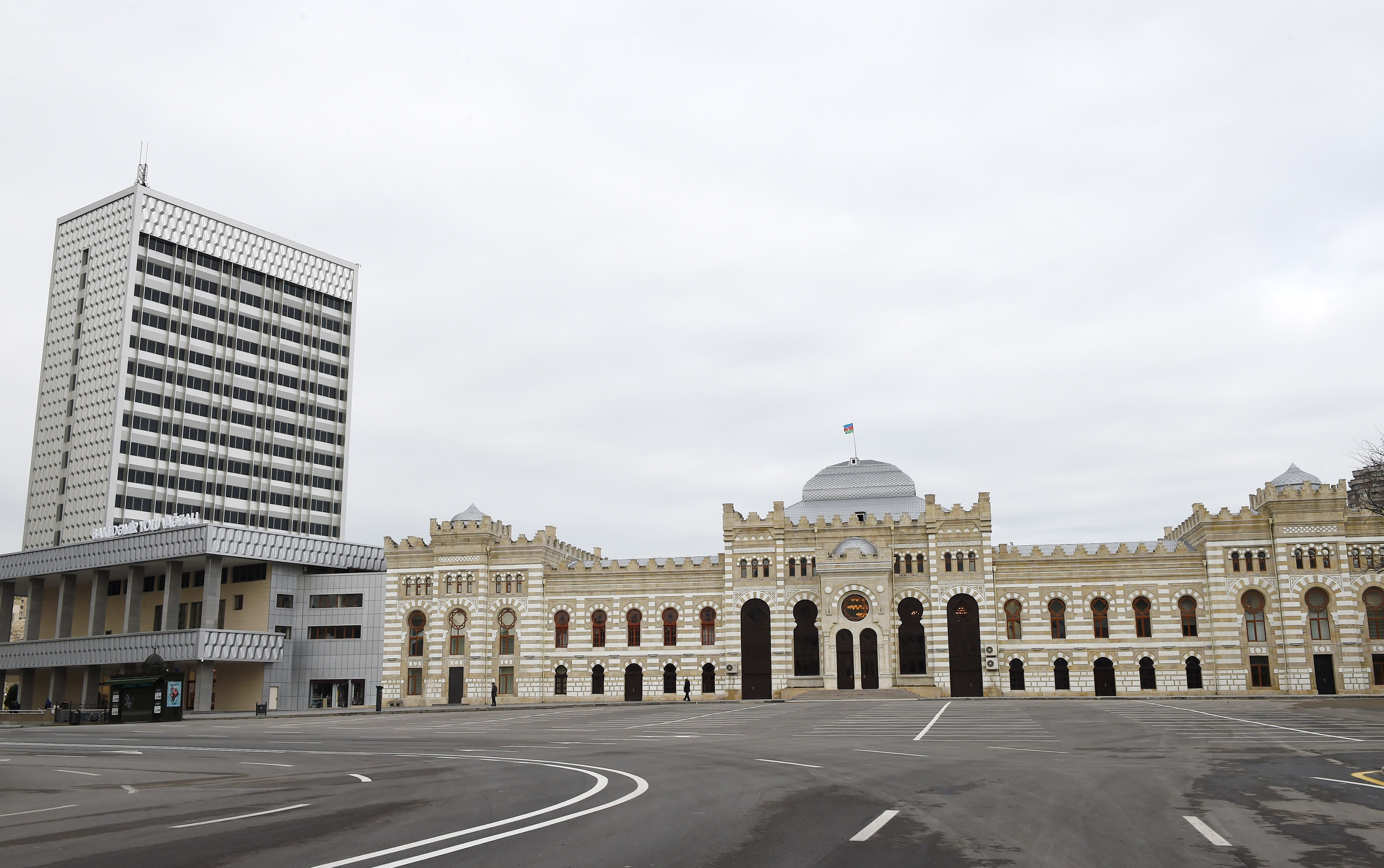
Baku Railway Station

=== 1878–1917 ===
The first railway line in Azerbaijan, then belonging to the Russian Empire was laid in 1878 and was opened in 1880 within the suburban range of Baku, which led from Sabunçu to Suraxanı, today situated within the city of Baku. The track width corresponded to the Russian 1,520 mm (4 ft 11 27/32 in) gauge.

The first long-distance railway line was opened in 1883, which led from Baku to Tbilisi in Georgia.

In 1900 railway lines were opened that connected Baku via Biləcəri with Derbent and Petrovsk (Makhachkala) in Dagestan and thus connected Azerbaijan with the rest of the Russian Empire (and later the Soviet Union).

In 1908, with the extension of the railway line from Ararat in Armenia to Şərur and Julfa in the Nakhchivan exclave of Azerbaijan, this part of Azerbaijan was connected with Armenia.

Thus, the development of the Azerbaijani Railway was, for the time being, considered final.

=== 1917–1991 ===
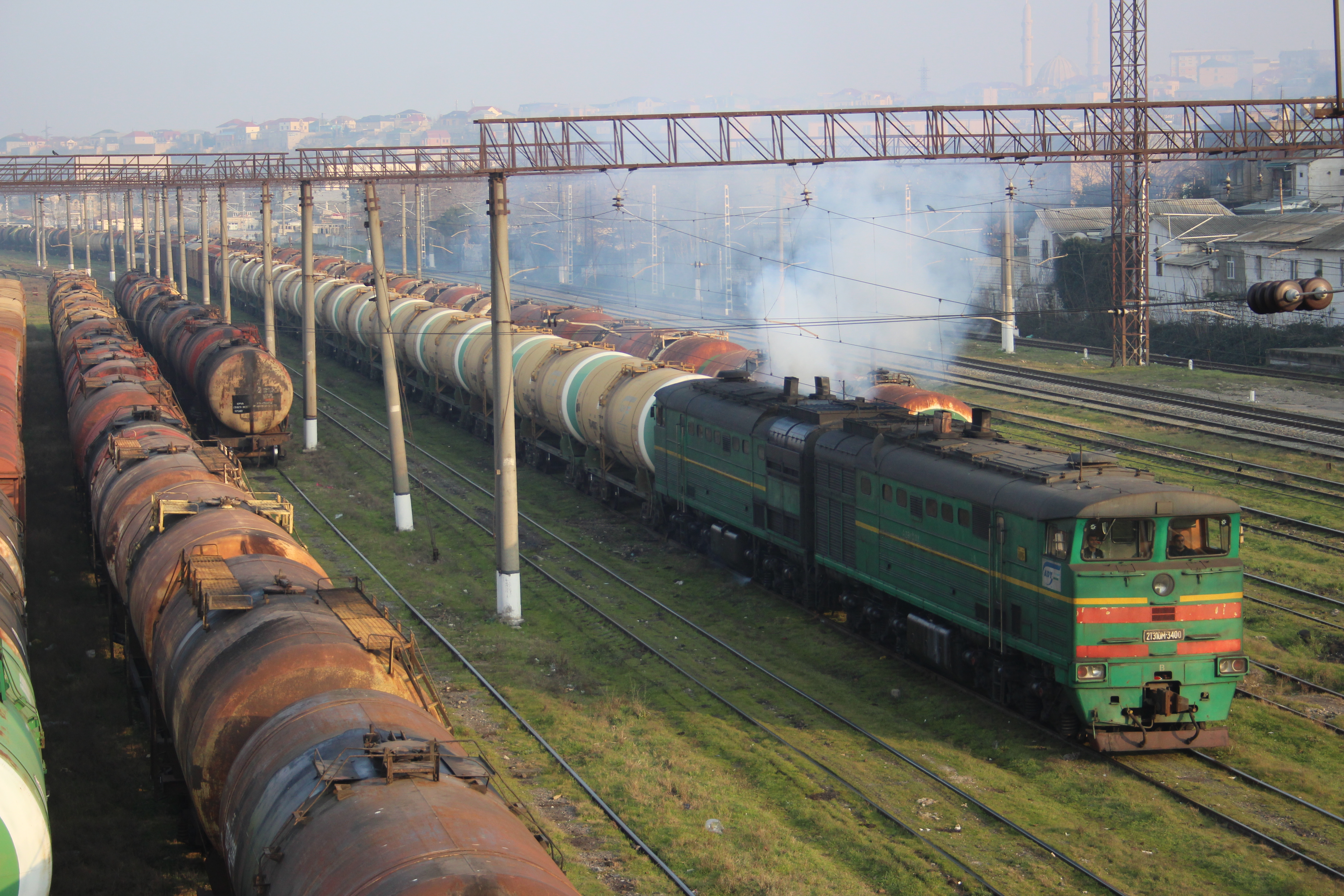
2TE10M locomotive built during the soviet era, which is still in service as of January 2020

After the collapse of the Russian Empire and the Russian Revolution, the country was transformed into the Soviet Union and the Russian Imperial Railways into the Soviet Railways.

Due to the availability of electricity from the vast water power sources of Azerbaijan, the very early electrification of the railway lines of Azerbaijan began. In 1926, with the electrification with 1,2 kV (1,200 V) direct current of the railway line between Baku and Sabunçu, it became the first electrically operated railway line of the Soviet Union. Later electrifications took place with 3 kV (3,000 V) direct current.

In 1924, the railway line was extended southwards to Ələt and Neftçala.

In 1941, the railway line was extended from Horadiz and Mincivan through Armenia, including a railway line extension to Kapan, to Julfa in the Nakhchivan exclave of Azerbaijan. Thus the Nakhchivan exclave of Azerbaijan was finally connected with Azerbaijan proper.

In 1941, the railway line was also extended southwards to Astara, Azerbaijan at the southern border with Iran.

In 1944, the railway line was extended to Kətəlparaq, Ağdam and Stepanakert (Xankəndi).

Until 1991, the railway traffic was operated in Azerbaijan by the Soviet Railway under the supervision of the Soviet Traffic Ministry. The Azerbaijani branch of the Soviet Railways was divided into three departments of Baku, Gəncə and Nakhchivan City.

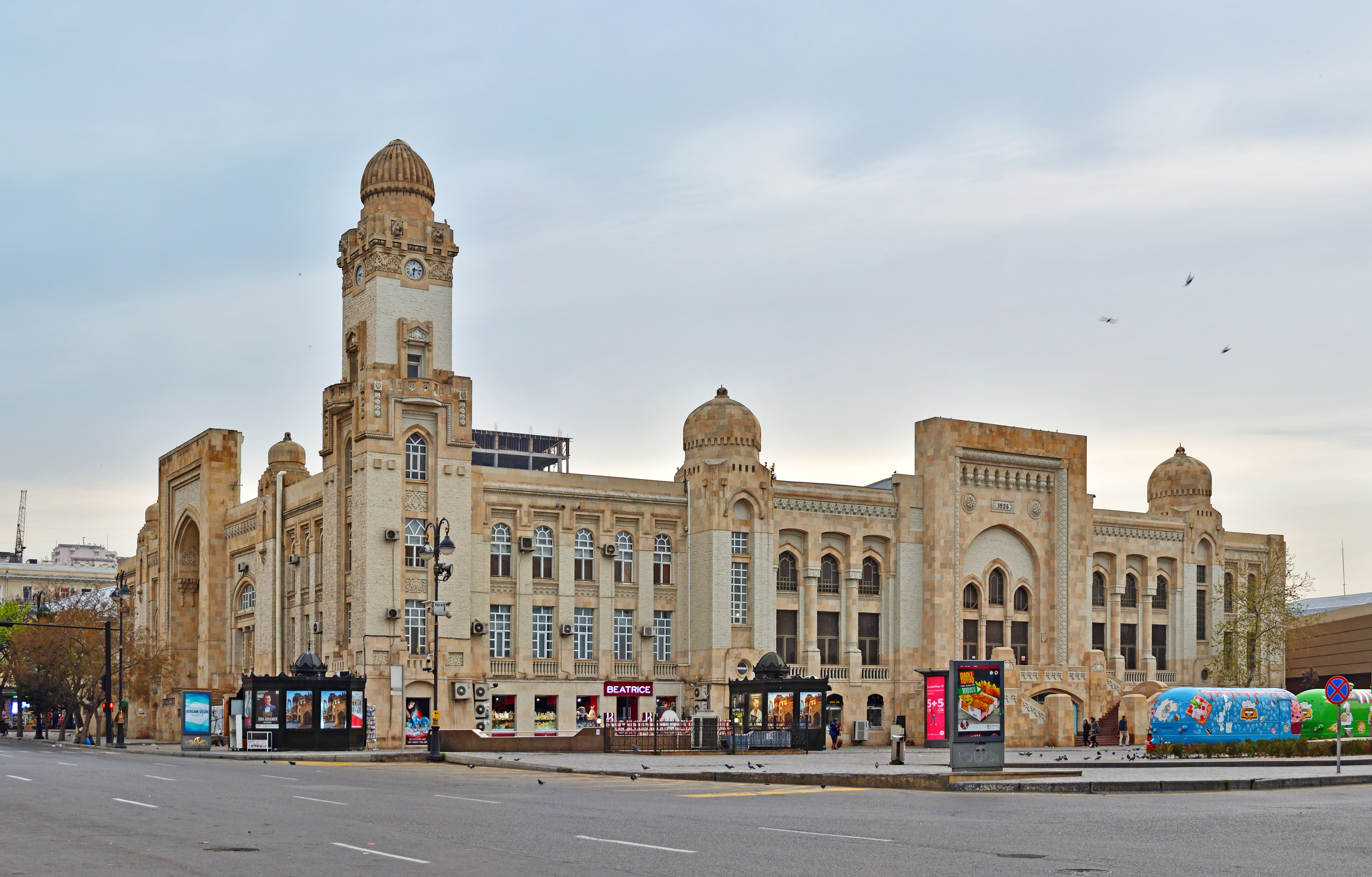
Main building of the Azerbaijan Railways in Baku

=== 1991–present ===
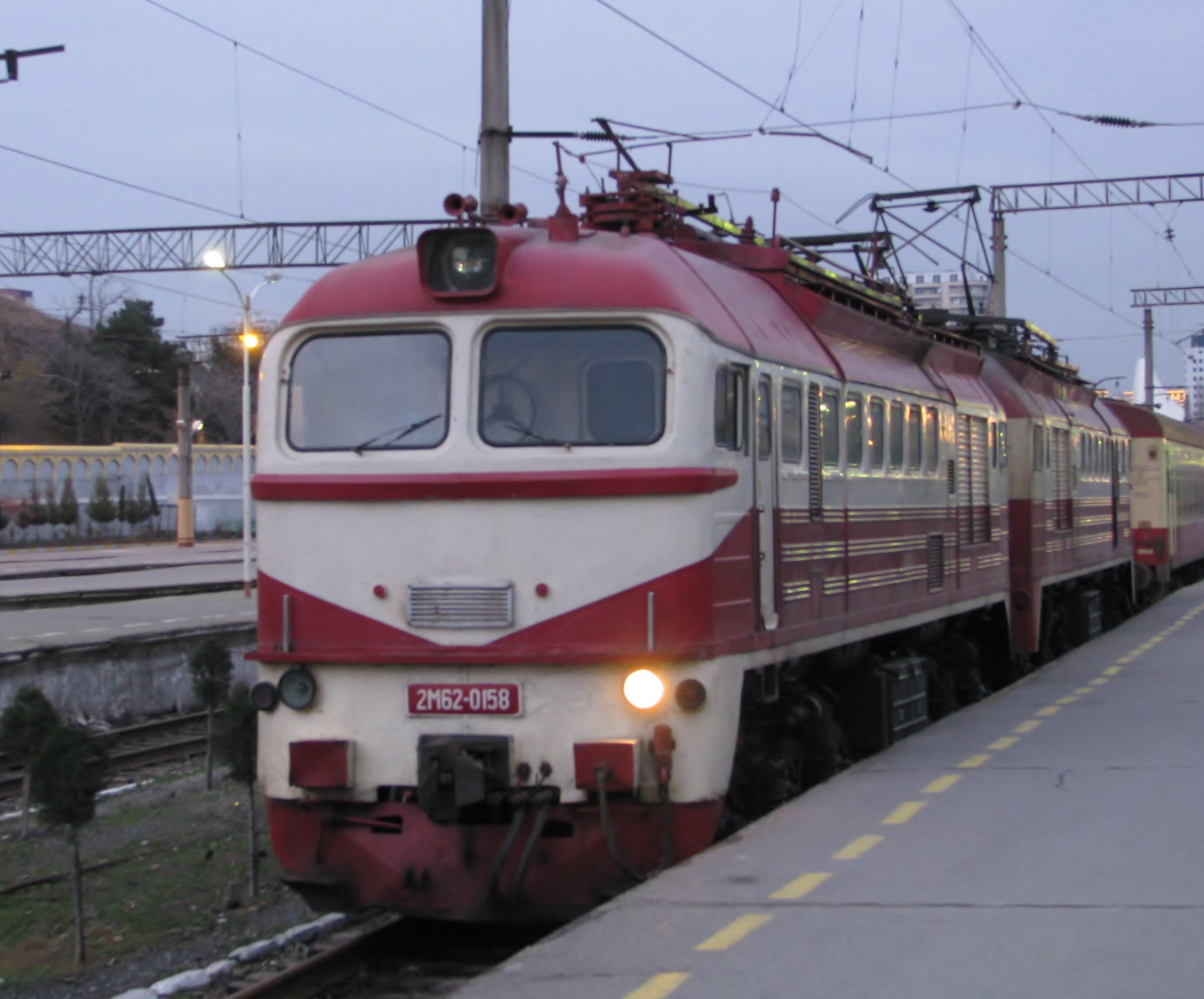
E2M62 electric locomotive at Baku station (before modernisation)

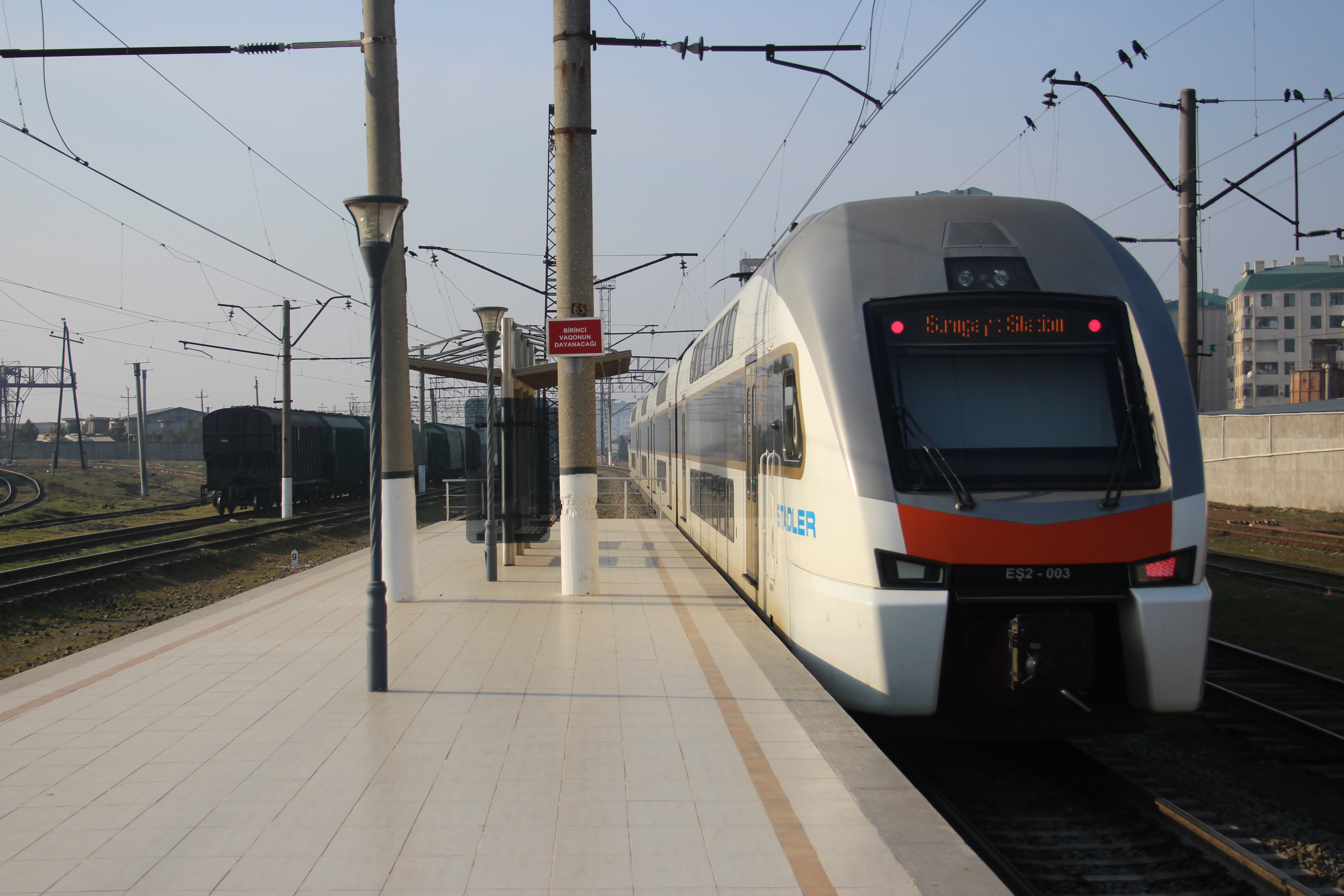
Stadler KISS 'Eurasia' electric multiple unit at Xırdalan

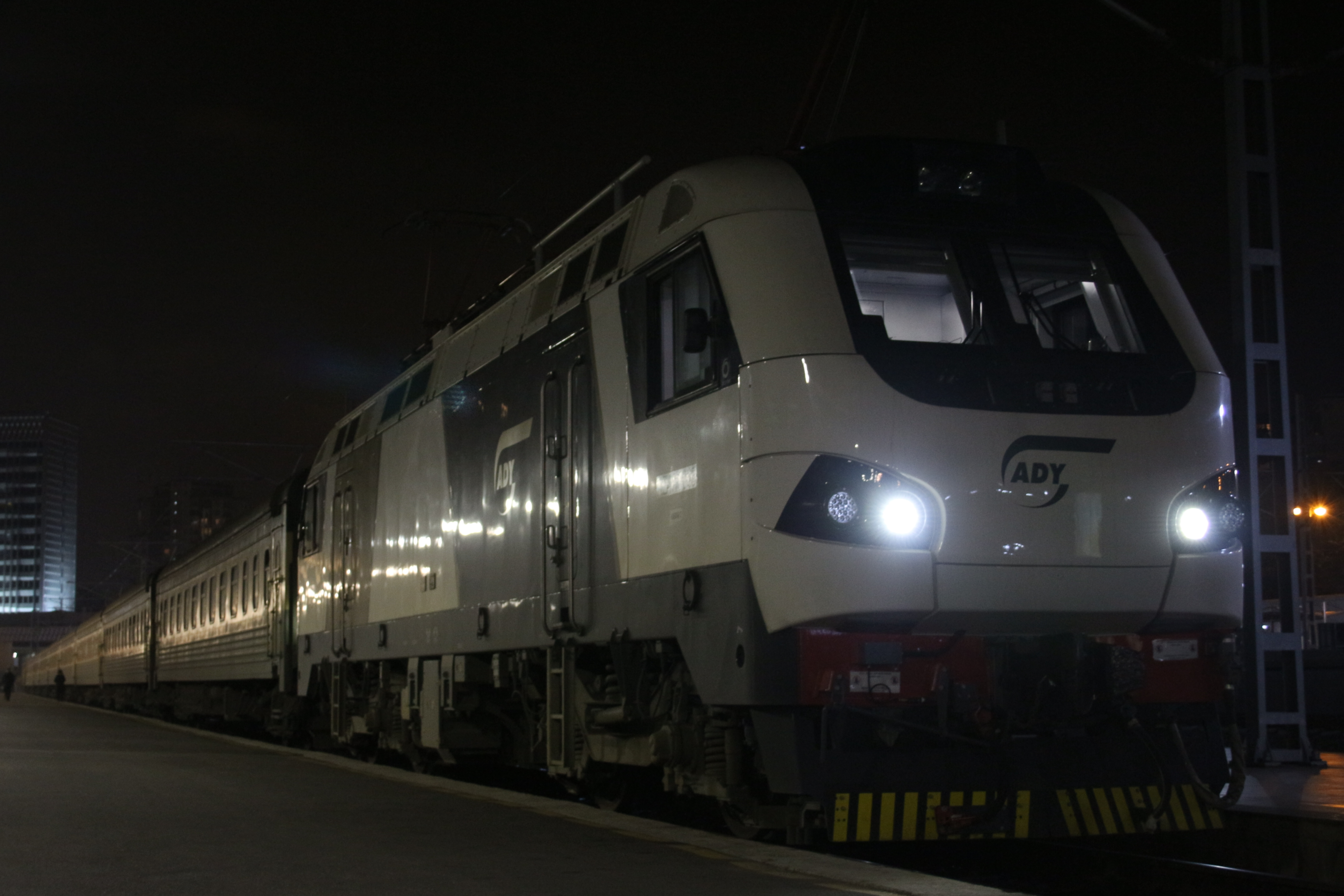
Alstom Prima AZ4A on the international train to Tbilisi

With the independence of the Republic of Azerbaijan in 1991, the Azerbaijan State Railways (Azərbaycan Dövlət Dəmir Yolları) was formed the same year.

Due to the conflict with Armenia over the Nagorno-Karabakh region in Azerbaijan, the railway service in the Armenian occupied areas of Azerbaijan, including Nagorno-Karabakh as well as international railway traffic to Armenia, has been cut. As a result, 240.4 km of Azerbaijani railway was under Armenian occupation.

In freight traffic, the exportation of oil from the oil wells from Baku at the Caspian Sea to the Georgian port of Batumi at the Black Sea forms an important share of the rail transport in Azerbaijan: The freight market share of the Azerbaijan State Railway was 21% in 1999.

In 2009, the closed joint-stock company "Azerbaijan Railways" (Azәrbaycan Dәmir Yolları Qapalı Səhmdar Cəmiyyəti, "ADY" QSC) - the national operator of the railway network in Azerbaijan with 100% state capital—was founded on the basis of the Azerbaijan State Railways, functionally replacing it.

The Kars–Tbilisi–Baku railway is a regional railway project to directly connect Turkey, Georgia, and Azerbaijan. The project was scheduled for completion in 2017. Although no additional railway lines will be added in Azerbaijan itself, as this section in Azerbaijan is already double track and electrified, the railway lines will be modernized, and new and fast rail stock will be added and will replace the old rail stock, which is still in service. The freight market share of the railways is also expected to rise rapidly with the completion of the Kars–Tbilisi–Baku railway.

Stadler is to supply double-deck EMUs to Azerbaijan. An agreement for the supply of five Kiss double-deck electric multiple-units was signed by Stadler Rail CEO Peter Spuhler and Javid Gurbanov, Chairman of national railway ADY, at the TransCaspian 2015 trade fair in Baku on May 13.

National railway ADY has placed a €300 million order for 50 Alstom KZ8A twin-section 25 kV AC electric freight locomotives. Also, September 7, 2015, Alstom has begun developing the components for AZ8A freight electric locomotives, intended for supply to Azerbaijan.

==== Baku suburban railway ====
In 2019, a commuter railway in Baku was launched, connecting it to Sabunçu. Also it was extended to Sumgait city.

== Key indicators and areas of activity ==
=== Freight transportation ===
Top groups of goods transported by rail in 2021
Group of goods	Volume (tonnes)	Share in the total volume of cargo transportation (%)
Oil products	6.515.993	34,8
Cereals	1.568.078	8,4
Mineral construction materials	1.488.730	7,9
Chemical and mineral fertilizers	1.347.228	7,2
Black metals	985.555	5,3
Forest products	853.033	4,6
Industrial raw materials and molds	731.166	3,9
Coal	415.649	2,2
Wood materials	228.788	1,2

=== Passenger transportation ===
Currently, ADY trains operate on these routes:

- The trains operating on the Baku-Gazakh-Baku route make stops at Baku, Bilajari, Laki, Ujar, Yevlakh, Goran, Ganja, Deller, Govlar, Tovuz, Aghstafa, and Gazakh stations. ...

Total number of passengers transported by rail
	2019	2020	2021	2022	2023	2024	2025
I quarter	718.310	1.081.747	476.232	943.512	1.509.509		
II quarter	858.896	253.973	639.023	1.184.290			
III quarter	971.424	334.022	648.078	1.249.692			
IV quarter	1.301.808	454.610	1.062.759	1.759.030			
Total	3.850.438	2.124.352	2.826.092	5.136 517	7.000.000	8.500.000	10.000.000

== International railway links with neighboring countries ==
- Russia - open - 1,520 mm (4 ft 11 27/32 in) gauge.
- (Georgia (country)) Georgia - open - 1,520 mm (4 ft 11 27/32 in) gauge.
- Iran - open - break-of-gauge 1,520 mm (4 ft 11 27/32 in) - 1,435 mm (4 ft 8 1/2 in) - only via the Azerbaijani exclave Nakhchivan (Julfa/Jolfa railway bridge), a railway link with Azerbaijan proper is being built. See North–South Transport Corridor.
- Turkey - open - link to Turkey with break-of-gauge 1,520 mm (4 ft 11 27/32 in) - 1,435 mm (4 ft 8 1/2 in) from Georgia is opened on 30 October 2017. See Kars–Tbilisi–Baku railway. The rail line via Nakhchivan is under construction.
- Armenia - closed - 1,520 mm (4 ft 11 27/32 in) gauge - closed after hostilities between Armenia and Azerbaijan.
- Kazakhstan - open - 1,520 mm (4 ft 11 27/32 in) gauge via train ferry across the Caspian Sea as part of the Trans-Caspian International Transport Route.
- Turkmenistan - open - 1,520 mm (4 ft 11 27/32 in) gauge via train ferry across the Caspian Sea.

== Projects ==
=== International transport corridors ===
==== International North–South Transport Corridor ====
The North-South transport corridor is designed to deliver cargo from India and the Iranian Gulf region to Russia, Western Europe, the Baltic States, and the Scandinavian countries. The main advantage of the North-South Transit Corridor compared to other routes is that the transit distance and transit time is two to three times less. If sea transportation takes 45-60 days through the Persian Gulf and the Indian Ocean, the Suez Canal, the Mediterranean, and the Baltic Sea to Helsinki, this period with the North-South Transit Corridor is 20-25 days.

The agreement on the establishment of the North-South international transport corridor was signed between the governments of Russia, Iran, and India on September 12, 2000. The Republic of Azerbaijan acceded to this agreement on the basis of the Law of September 20, 2005.

==== The Middle Corridor ====
The Middle Corridor, or Trans-Caspian International Transport Route (TITR), serves to increase freight traffic from China to Turkey, as well as to the European Union, and vice versa. The management and development of the transport corridor is carried out by the members of the established Consortium.

Trains running on this corridor deliver goods from China to Europe in an average of 10-12 days. This is one of the main advantages of the transport corridor.

==== North West Transport Corridor ====
The creation of the North-West transport corridor was made possible by the commissioning of the Baku-Tbilisi-Kars railway in 2017. This corridor is designed for increased freight operations between Turkey and Russia via the Baku-Tbilisi-Kars railway. In particular, the North-West transport corridor facilitates the transportation of Russian-produced coal and grain cargo to Turkey via the Baku-Tbilisi-Kars railway.

==== South-West Transport Corridor ====
The history of the corridor dates back to the beginning of 2016. The Southwest Transport Corridor operates on the geographical route of the Persian Gulf / India - Iran - Azerbaijan - Georgia - Ukraine - Europe (or Turkey - Europe). The corridor was established at the initiative of Azerbaijan Railways (ADY). The presentation of the route was held on January 12, 2016, in Baku, during which discussions were held between the enterprises of the railways and seaports of Azerbaijan, Georgia, Iran, Ukraine, as a result of which a protocol on the development of the corridor was signed. According to this document, the full name of the corridor is "Persian Gulf - Iran Astara and the Caspian Sea - Black Sea - Europe."

==== Lapis Lazuli corridor ====
A five-party agreement between Afghanistan-Turkmenistan-Azerbaijan-Georgia-Turkey on transit and transport cooperation on the Lapis-Lazuli route was signed on November 15, 2017, in Ashgabat. The document envisages the modernization of the transport infrastructure of the participating countries (road, rail, and sea), as well as the simplification of customs clearance procedures. The agreement facilitates the uninterrupted transportation of goods through the territory of the Contracting Parties, simplifies issues and procedures related to the transit of traffic, and ensures the safety of vehicles, cargo, and passengers.

== See also ==
- Azerbaijan
- Rail transport in Azerbaijan
- Transport in Azerbaijan
- Chingiz Ildyrym
- Baku–Tbilisi–Kars railway
- Zangezur corridor
