= Rovshan Rustamov =

Azerbaijani chief executive officer

Rovshan Rustamov Rövşən Rüstəmov
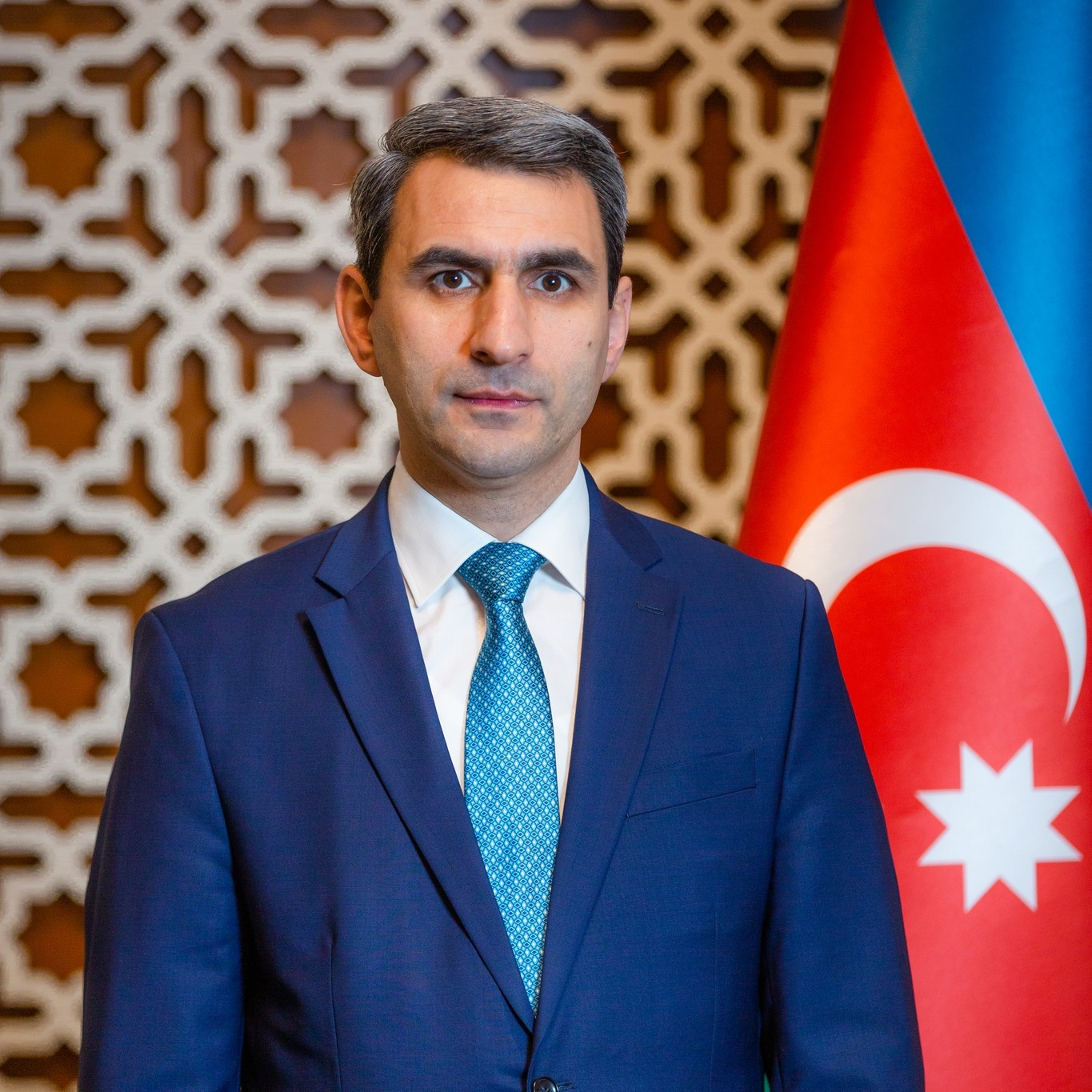

Chairman of Azerbaijan Railways CJSC
- Incumbent
- Assumed office 26 October 2022
- Preceded by: Javid Gurbanov

Deputy Minister of Transport, Communications and High Technologies
- In office 14 June 2021 – 26 October 2022
- Minister: Rashad Nabiyev

Vice President of Azerbaijan Judo Federation
- Incumbent
- Assumed office 4 June 2021
- President: Rashad Nabiyev

Deputy Chairman of Azercosmos OJSC
- In office 24 January 2018 – 25 January 2021

Personal details
- Born: 6 October 1980 (age 45) Jafarli, Imishli District
- Education: Public Administration Academy (1997-2003), Business Continuity Institute (2014)
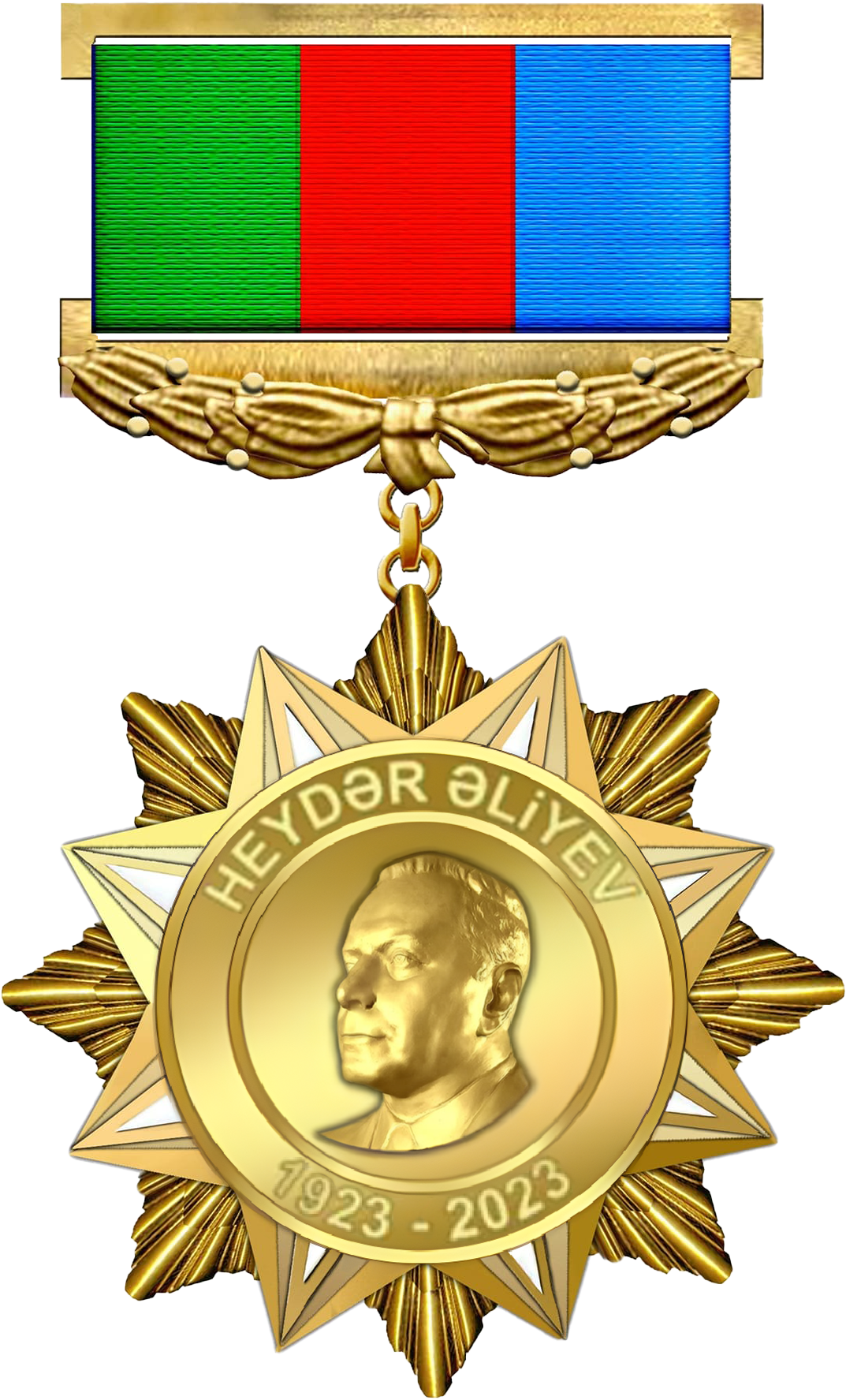
- Awards

Rovshan Murvat Oghlu Rustamov (Azerbaijani: Rövşən Mürvət oğlu Rüstəmov; born 1980) is an Azerbaijani executive officer serving as the chairman of Azerbaijan Railways CJSC since 2022.

== Biography ==
Rovshan Rustamov was born on October 6, 1980, in Jafarli village of Imishli region.

In 1997-2001, he studied at the Academy of Public Administration under the President of the Republic of Azerbaijan, graduated with honors from the Faculty of State and Municipal Administration, and received a bachelor's degree.

In 2001-2003, he continued his education at the Academy of Public Administration under the President of the Republic of Azerbaijan with a degree in the legal regulation of the economy, graduated with honors, and received a master's degree.

In 2007, he defended his dissertation and received a PhD in economics.

In 2004-2012, he worked as Deputy Head of the Business Development Department, the Head of the Operations Department of Azerpost LLC.

In 2012-2014, he worked as a corporate governance consultant at Azercosmos OJSC.

In 2014, he continued his studies at the Business Continuity Institute and graduated from the Business Continuity Planning Program. Since 2014, Rovshan Rustamov has been a full member of the Institute for Sustainable Business Development.

In 2018, he was appointed Deputy Chairman of Azercosmos OJSC by the Decree of the President of the Republic of Azerbaijan dated June 4, 2018.

In 2021, Rovshan Rustamov has been appointed as Deputy Minister of Transport, Communications and High Technologies by the Order of the President of the Republic of Azerbaijan dated June 14, 2021.

In 2022, he has been appointed as chairman of Azerbaijan Railways CJSC By the Decree of the President of the Republic of Azerbaijan dated October 26, 2022.

== Awards ==
Rovshan Rustamov was awarded the “Progress” Medal by the Decree of the President of the Republic of Azerbaijan in 2014.

In 2024, Rovshan Rustamov was awarded the Jubilee medal "100 years of Heydar Aliyev (1923-2023)".
