= Trams in Sumgait =

Sumqayit tramway
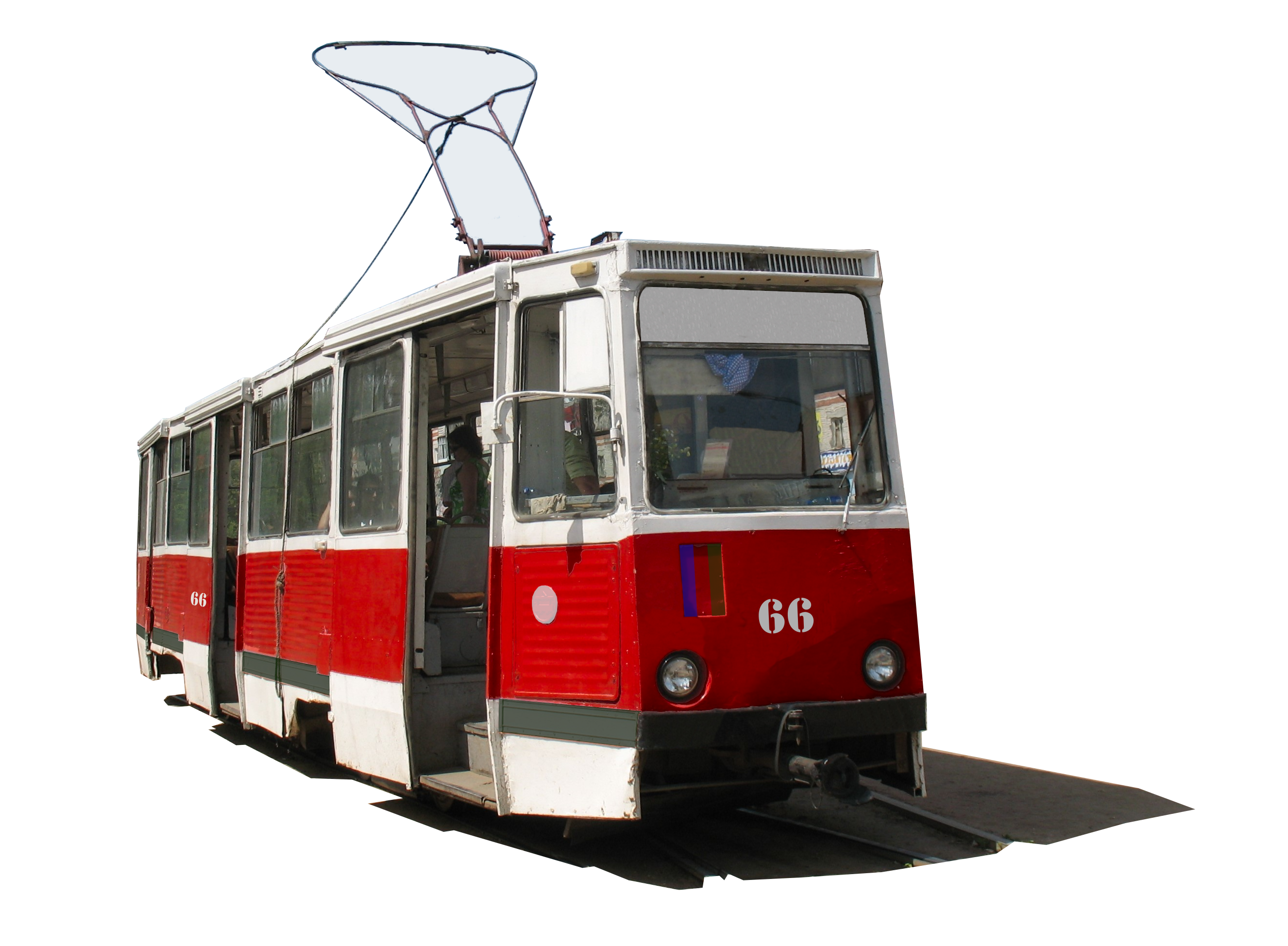

Operation
- Locale: Sumqayit, Azerbaijan
- Open: 11 March 1959
- Close: July 2003
- Status: Closed
- Lines: 1

Infrastructure
- Track gauge: 1,524 mm (5 ft)
- Propulsion system: Electricity

Statistics
Overview
The Sumqayit tramway in 2003

The Sumqayit tramway was a tramway forming part of the public transport system in Sumqayit, the third most populous city in Azerbaijan, for more than 40 years in the second half of the 20th century.

== History ==
The tramway was opened on 11 March 1959, and was powered by electricity. It only ever consisted of one line, and was closed in July 2003.

== Fleet ==
Tram Road Sign in Azerbaijan

In the period leading up to its closure, the tramway was operated by KTM-5 type trams.

== See also ==
- List of town tramway systems in Asia
- Trams in Baku
- Trams in Ganja
