= Trams in Ganja, Azerbaijan =

Tramway network, 1933–1976

Ganja tramway network

Operation
- Locale: Ganja, Azerbaijan
- Open: 1 May 1933
- Close: 16 October 1976
- Status: Closed
- Lines: 4 (max)

Infrastructure
- Track gauge: 1,524 mm (5 ft)
- Propulsion system: Electricity

The Ganja tramway network was a network of tramways forming part of the public transport system in Ganja, the second most populous city in Azerbaijan, for more than 40 years in the mid 20th century.

== History ==
Tram Road Sign in Azerbaijan

The network was opened on 1 May 1933, and was powered by electricity. At its height, it consisted of four lines. It was closed on 16 October 1976.

In January 2013, the government of Azerbaijan announced that it is planning to restore the tramway network in Ganja. The total length of the tramway network will be 15 km.

== See also ==
- List of town tramway systems in Asia
- Trams in Baku
- Trams in Sumgait
