= Trams in Baku =

Baku tramway network
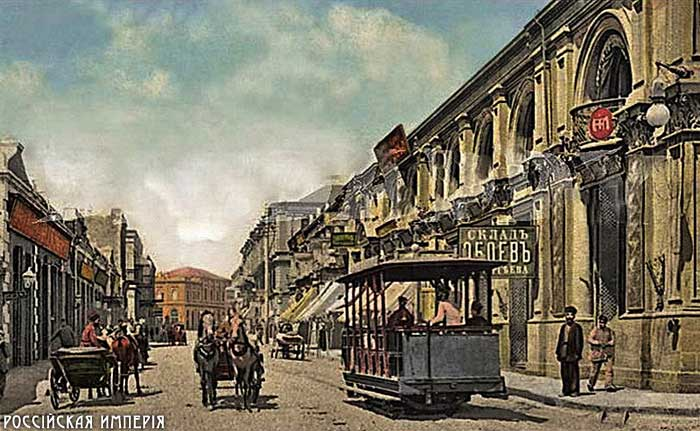

Operation
- Locale: Baku, Azerbaijan

Statistics
Horsecar era: 1889–1923
- Status: Closed
- Track gauge: 1,524 mm (5 ft)
- Propulsion system: Horses
Steam tram era: 1889–c. 1894
- Status: Closed
- Track gauge: 1,524 mm (5 ft)
- Propulsion system: Steam
Electric tram era: 1924–2004
- Status: Closed
- Lines: 16
- Track gauge: 1,524 mm (5 ft)
- Propulsion system: Electricity
- Map of tram system in Baku in the 1980s

The Baku tramway network was a network of tramways forming part of the public transport system in Baku, now the capital city of Azerbaijan, between 1889 and 2004.

== History ==
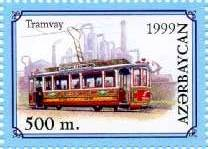
Stamps of Azerbaijan

=== Early tramways ===
The first tramway in Baku was a cable powered line, opened in 1887. It was used for passenger traffic and was later named "Chernogorodskaya" (Russian for "Black city"). On 7 April (19 April) 1889, a horsecar line was opened. The owner of that line took over the Chernogorodskaya line, and converted it to horsecar operation.

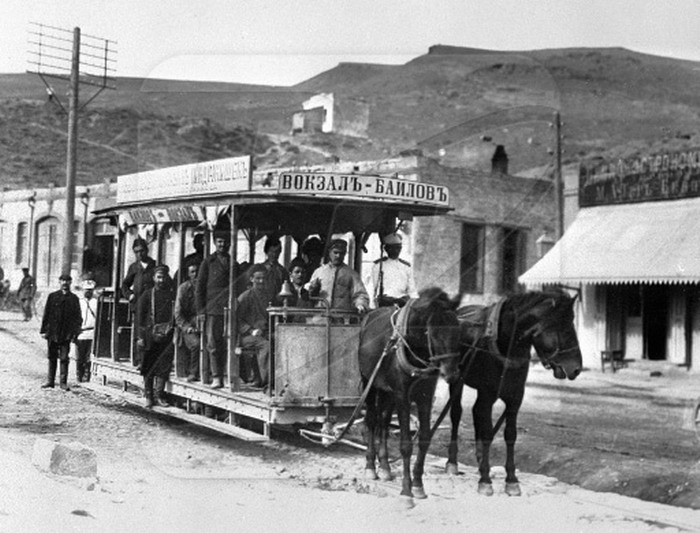
Horsecar tram in Baku, 1910.

Some five months later, on 24 September (6 October) 1889, the horsecar tramway was supplemented by a steam tramway. However, the steam tramway did not last very long. Competition from the horsecar tramway made it unprofitable, and it was closed in about 1894 and transformed into another horsecar tramway.

The Baku horsecar tramway was built to 1,524 mm (5 ft) gauge. There were also freight tramways laid between various enterprises around the city.

By the start of the 20th century, the horsecars were already unable to cope with growing volumes of passenger traffic in the oil industry centre of the Russian Empire. In 1903, the City Council received a proposal for the construction of a Baku electric tramway. For the next 20 years, the city bureaucracy created numerous commissions, and developed projects and budgets, until 1922, when the Council began planning the construction of an electric tramway network.

Meanwhile, Baku continued to be served by horsecar trams until the horsecar network was closed on 1 October 1923.

=== Electric tramway ===
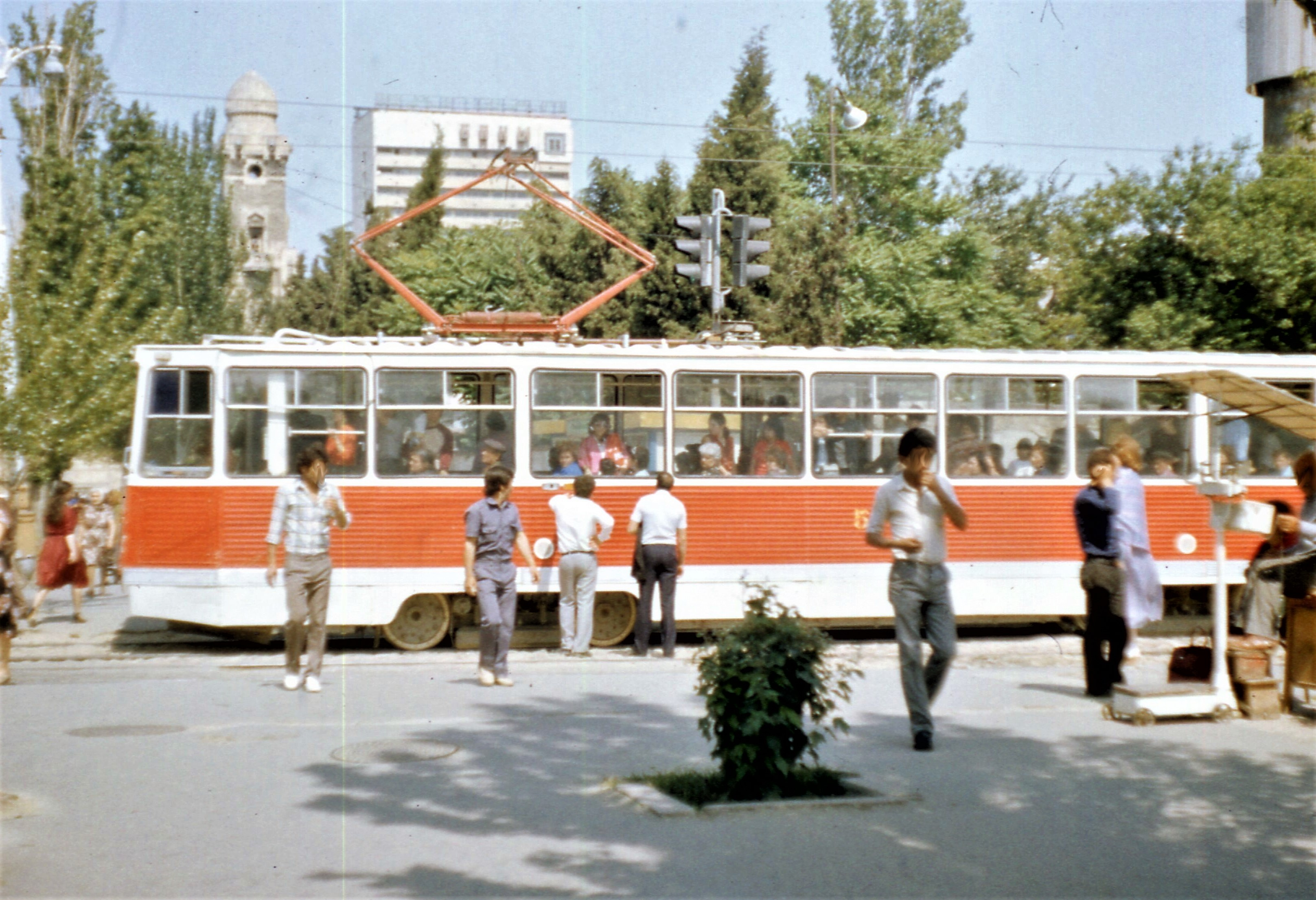
Tram in Baku, 1987

On 8 February 1924, an electric tramway was opened in Baku. The electric tramway network lasted until January 2004.

In February 2012, the government of Azerbaijan announced that it is planning to restore the tramway in Baku after dismantling it only eight years before. A new tramway line will be laid along the seaside promenade of Baku Boulevard in central Baku as part of the "Baku White City" development project. Unlike the former tramway network, the new tramway network will be considerably shorter in length, and it will not serve within the main road networks of Baku as was the case with the former tramway network, but it will instead run along the seaside promenade thus not mixing with the road traffic.

== Lines ==
Tram Road Sign in Azerbaijan

As of 1972, the electric tramway network's lines (with destinations in Russian) were as follows:

- № 1 – Semashko Hospital — 1st and 5th microdistricts.
- № 2 – Semashko Hospital — Musabekovo.
- № 3 – Baku Passenger railway station — 8th km.
- № 4 – Baku Passenger railway station — Lenin Textile Plant.
- № 5 – Semashko Hospital — Vorovski township.
- № 10 – Baku Passenger railway station — Inglab St.
- № 12а – Baku Passenger railway station — Fabriciuss St. — Semashko Hospital — Bakikhanov street — Fizuli square — Baku Passenger railway station (circular route).
- № 12б – Baku Passenger railway station — Fizuli square — Bakikhanov street – Semashko Hospital — Fabriciuss street — Baku Passenger railway station (circular route).
- № 14 – Baku Passenger railway station — Chapayev street — Aga Nematulla street — Kolkhoz market.

By the end of the 1980s, the network's lines (with destinations in Russian) had become:

- № 1 – Khatai Metro station — 1st microdistrict.
- № 2 – Railway station — Fabriciuss, Inglab and Chapayev streets' circle — Railway station (circular route).
- № 3 – Railway station — Aurora Metro station (now Qara Qarayev).
- № 4 – Railway station — Old Ahmadli.
- № 5 – Vorovski township — Montin market.
- № 6 – Khatai Metro station — Montin market.
- № 7 – Railway station — Fabriciuss, Inglab and Chapayev streets' circle — Railway station (circular route).

As of 2004, the only remaining line was line 6.

== Future ==
According to the plan, the tram network is planned to be 110 kilometers long by 2040. A total of 136 stations will be established.

Phase 1 -T1 28 May

Phase 2 -T2 SeaBreeze - 28 May

Phase 3 -T3 28 May Phase-Bayil

Phase 4 -T4 28 May - H. Aslanov

Phase 5 -T5 Binagadi - Azadliq Square

== See also ==
- List of town tramway systems in Asia
- Trams in Ganja
- Trams in Sumgait
