= Business Continuity Institute =

The Business Continuity Institute (BCI) was established in 1994 by Andrew Hiles and others, evolving from the Survive Group - a network of disaster recovery and business continuity experts. The institute's initial vision was to enable individual members to obtain guidance and support from fellow business continuity practitioners.

== History ==
The BCI's first AGM was held in 1995 in London, becoming an independent organisation in May 1997. It was initially led by John Marsh and then John Sharp.

In 2004 the BCI expanded, moving to office space in Caversham, Berkshire under the leadership of new executive director, Lorraine Darke. Lorraine continued in this role until September 2016, when she stepped down - being replaced by David Thorp, the current BCI Executive Director.

Currently, the BCI is based in Reading, UK, and has over 9,000 members in more than 120 countries. More details of the development of the BCI are available in a timeline listing on the institute's website.

== See also ==
- Business continuance volume
- Business interruption insurance
