= Operational continuity =

Operational continuity refers to the ability of a system to continue working despite damages, losses, or critical events. In the Human Resources and Organizational domain, including IT, it implies the need to determine the level of resilience of the system, its ability to recover after an event, and build a system that resists to external and internal events or is able to recover after an event without losing its external performance management capability. Organizational Continuity is achieved only with specific corporate planning. In the material domain, it determines the need to adopt redundant systems, performance monitoring systems, and can even imply the practice to cannibalize or to remove serviceable assemblies, sub-assemblies or components from a repairable or serviceable item of equipment to install them on another, in order to keep the external system performance active. Operational continuity may be referred to single systems, single individuals, up to teams or entire complex systems such as IT infrastructures, implying the ability of an organization or system to continue to provide its mission.

== See also ==
- Business continuity
- Disaster response
- Emergency management
