= Kətəlparaq =

- Municipality
- Location within Azerbaijan Location within Karabakh Economic Region
- Coordinates: 40°17′28″N 47°07′01″E
- Country: Azerbaijan
- Rayon: Barda

Population
  - Total: 3,058
- Time zone: UTC+4 (AZT)
  - Summer (DST): UTC+5 (AZT)

Kətəlparaq (also, Ketalparag and Ketal-Porakh) is a village and municipality in the Barda Rayon of Azerbaijan. It has a population of 3,058.
