= List of cities in Azerbaijan =

Map of Azerbaijan

This is a list of cities in Azerbaijan. Azerbaijan is a country in the South Caucasus region, situated at the crossroads of Southwest Asia and Southeastern Europe. As of 2013, Azerbaijan has 78 cities, including 10 cities of republican subordination, 67 district-level cities, and 1 special legal status city. These are followed by 260 urban-type settlements and 4,252 villages.

== Cities in Azerbaijan ==
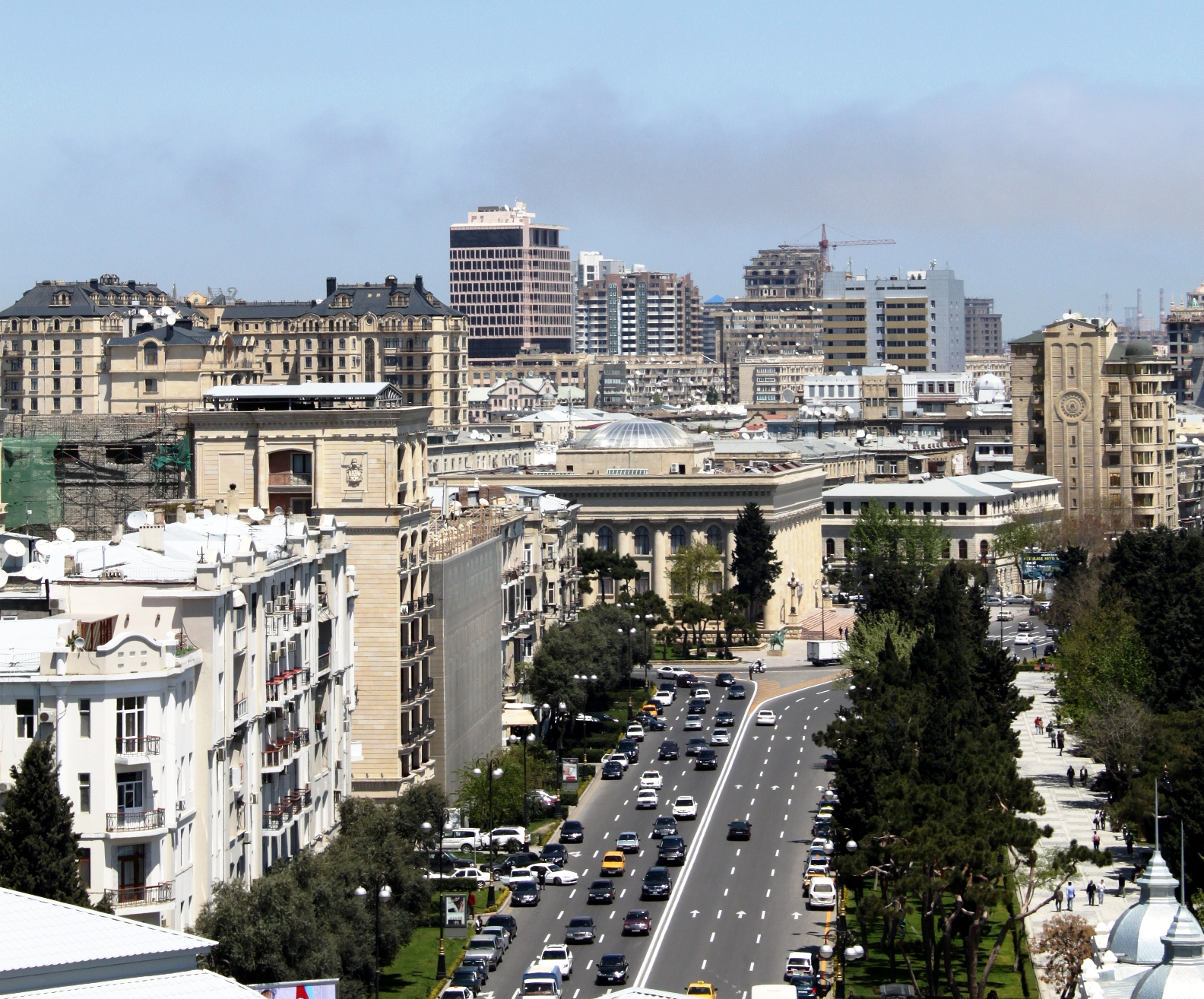
Baku, capital of Azerbaijan

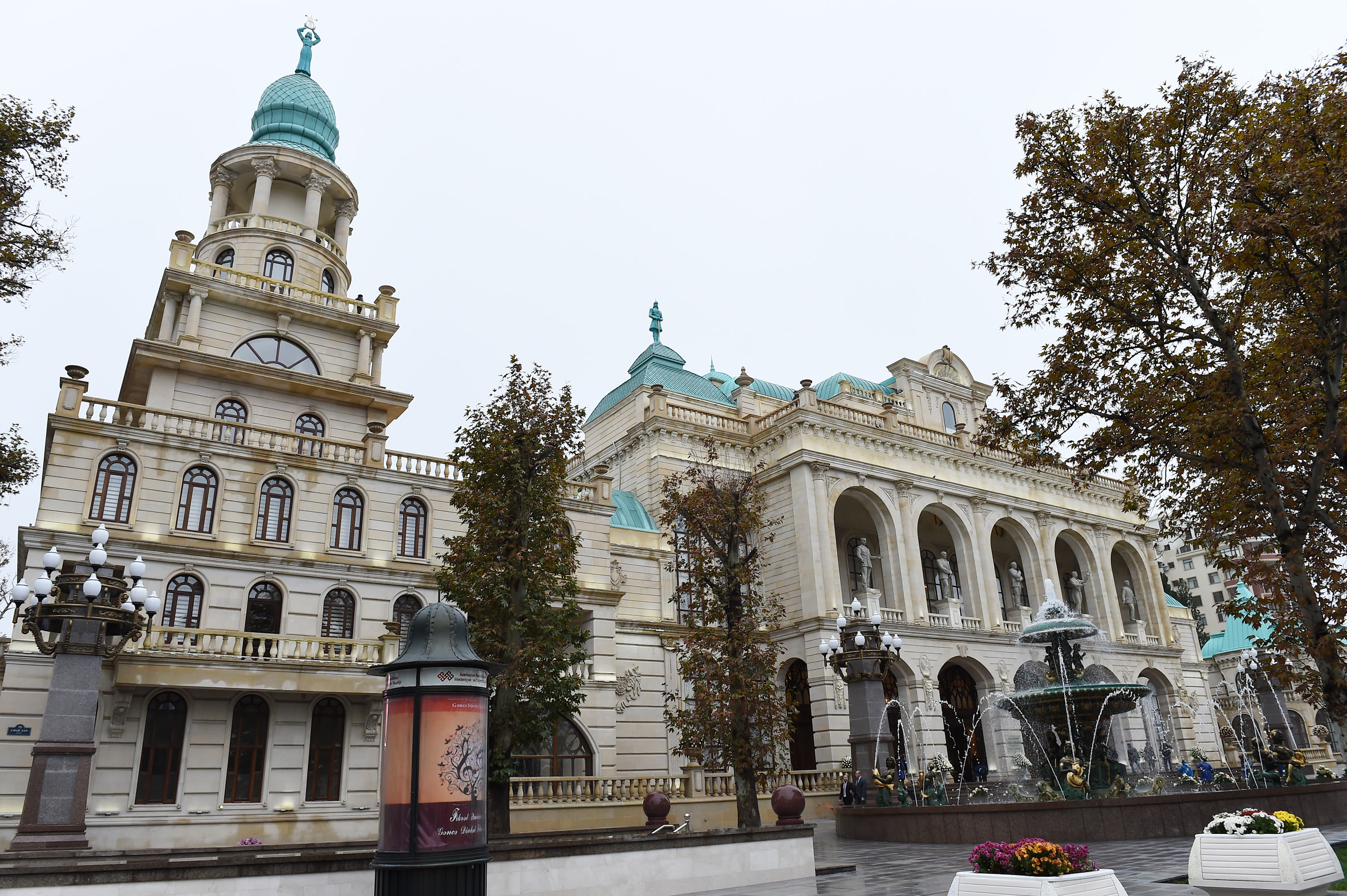
Ganja City’s Ganja State Philharmonic Hall

Sumgait

Lankaran

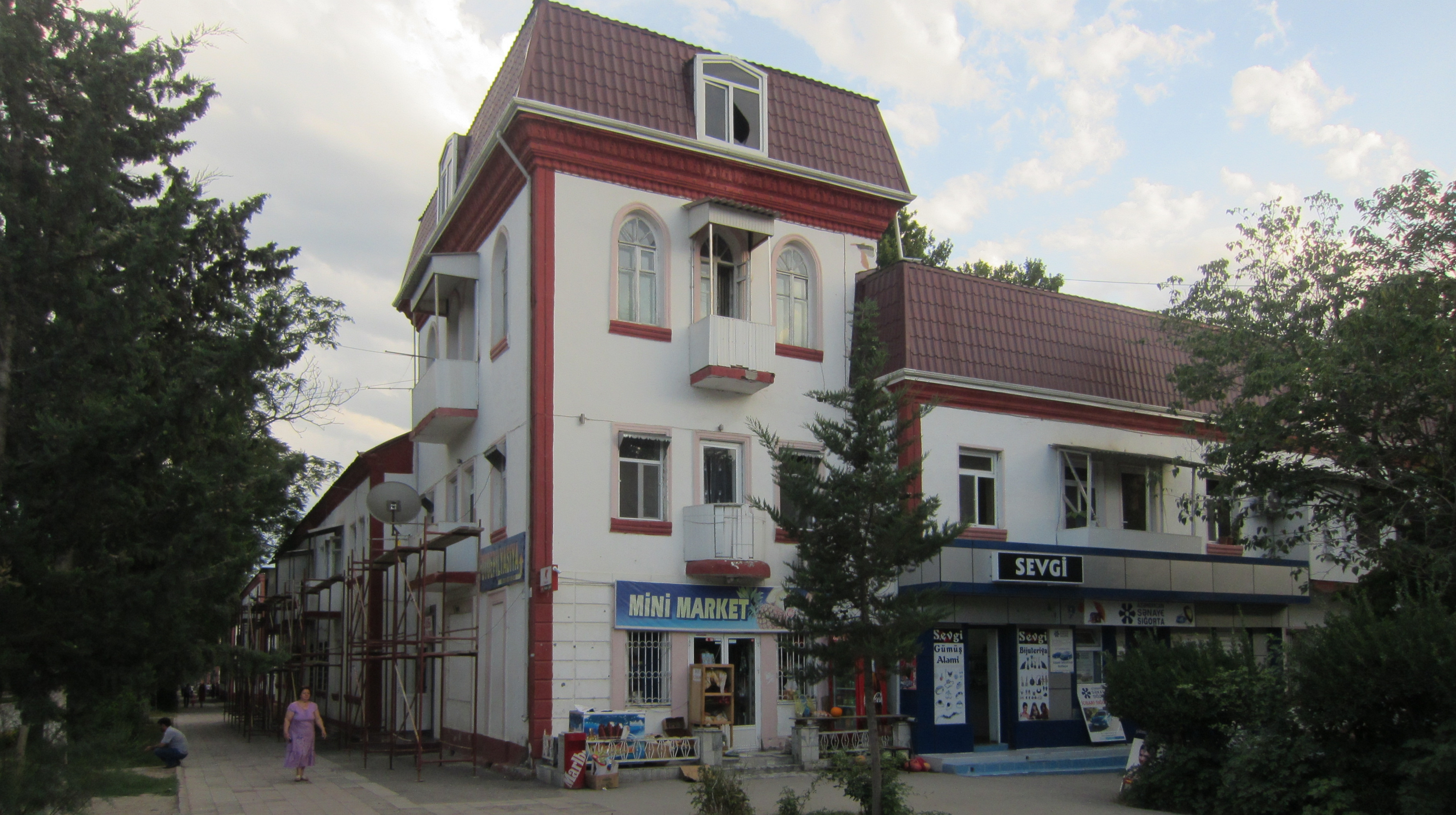
Mingachevir

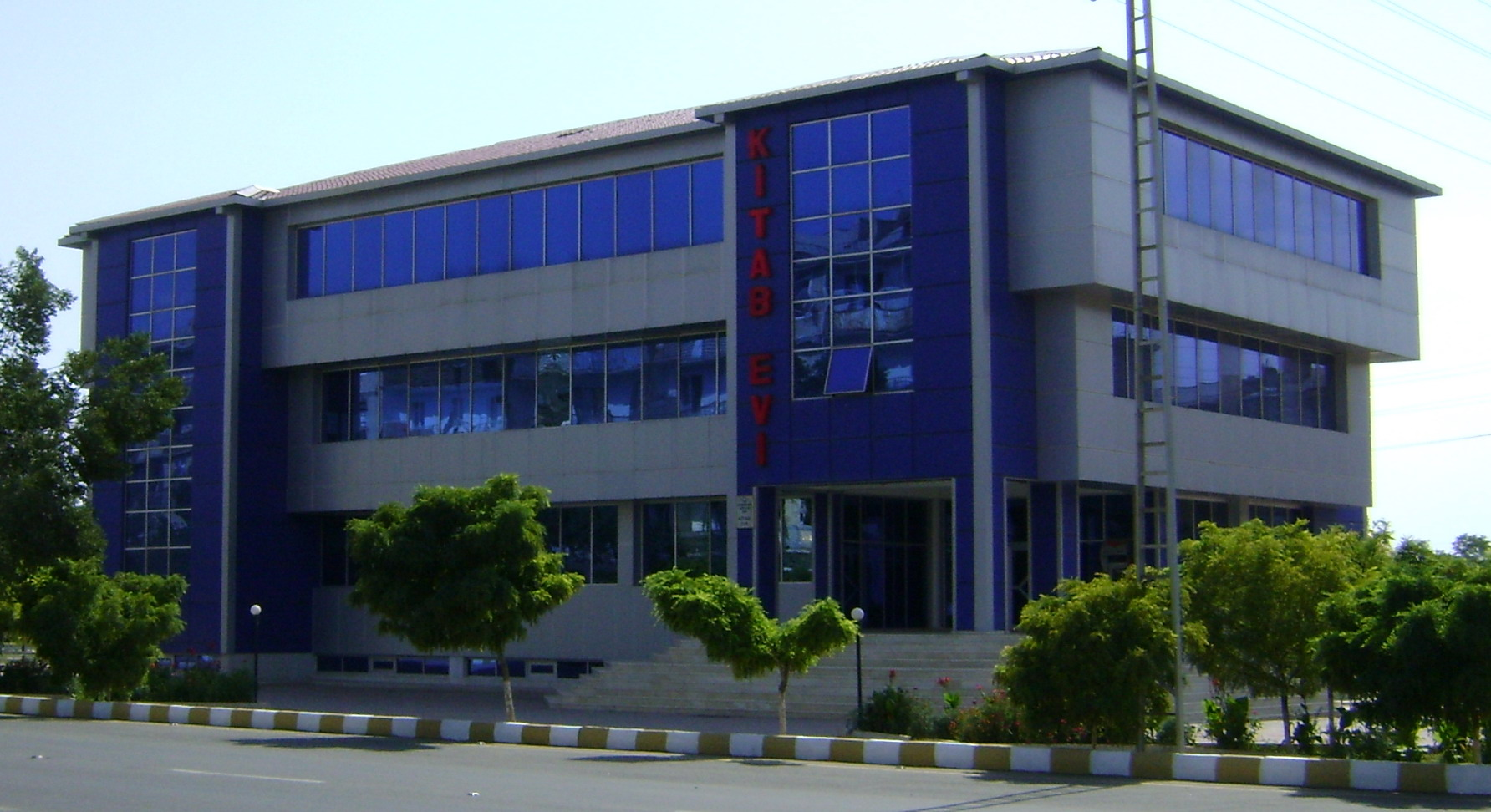
Nakhchivan

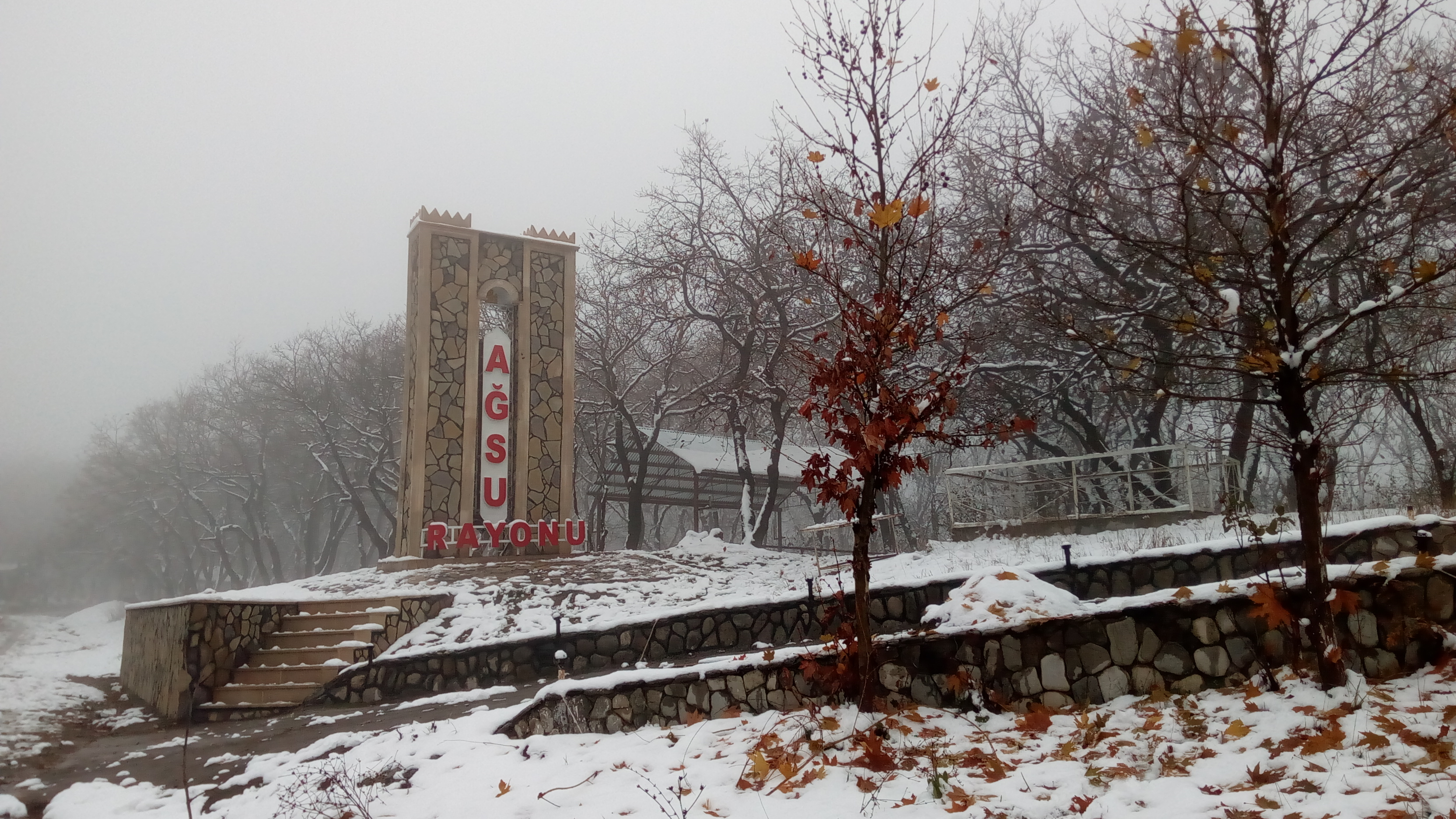
Road sign at the entrance to Agsu

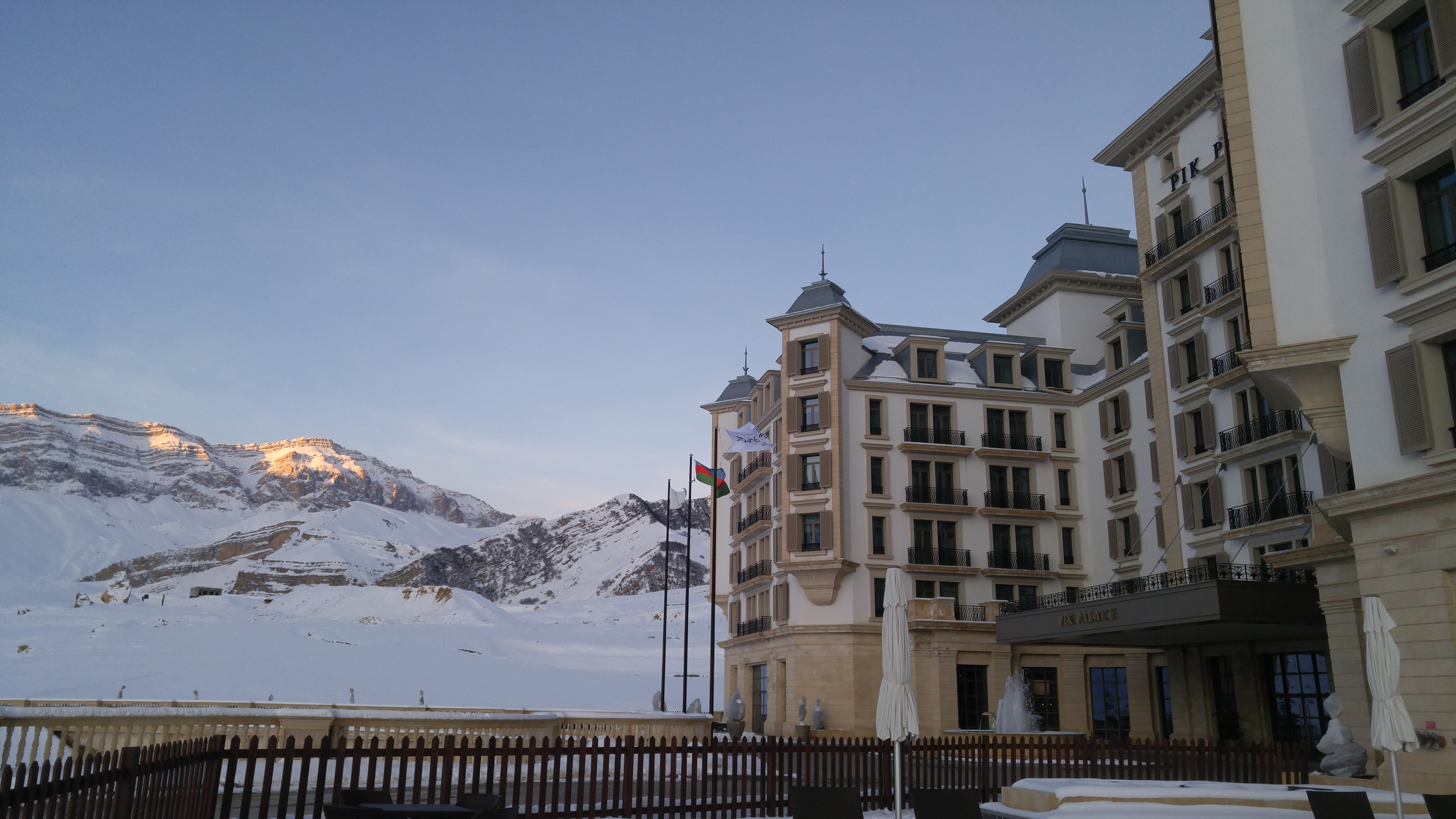
Qusar's Shahdag Mountain Resort

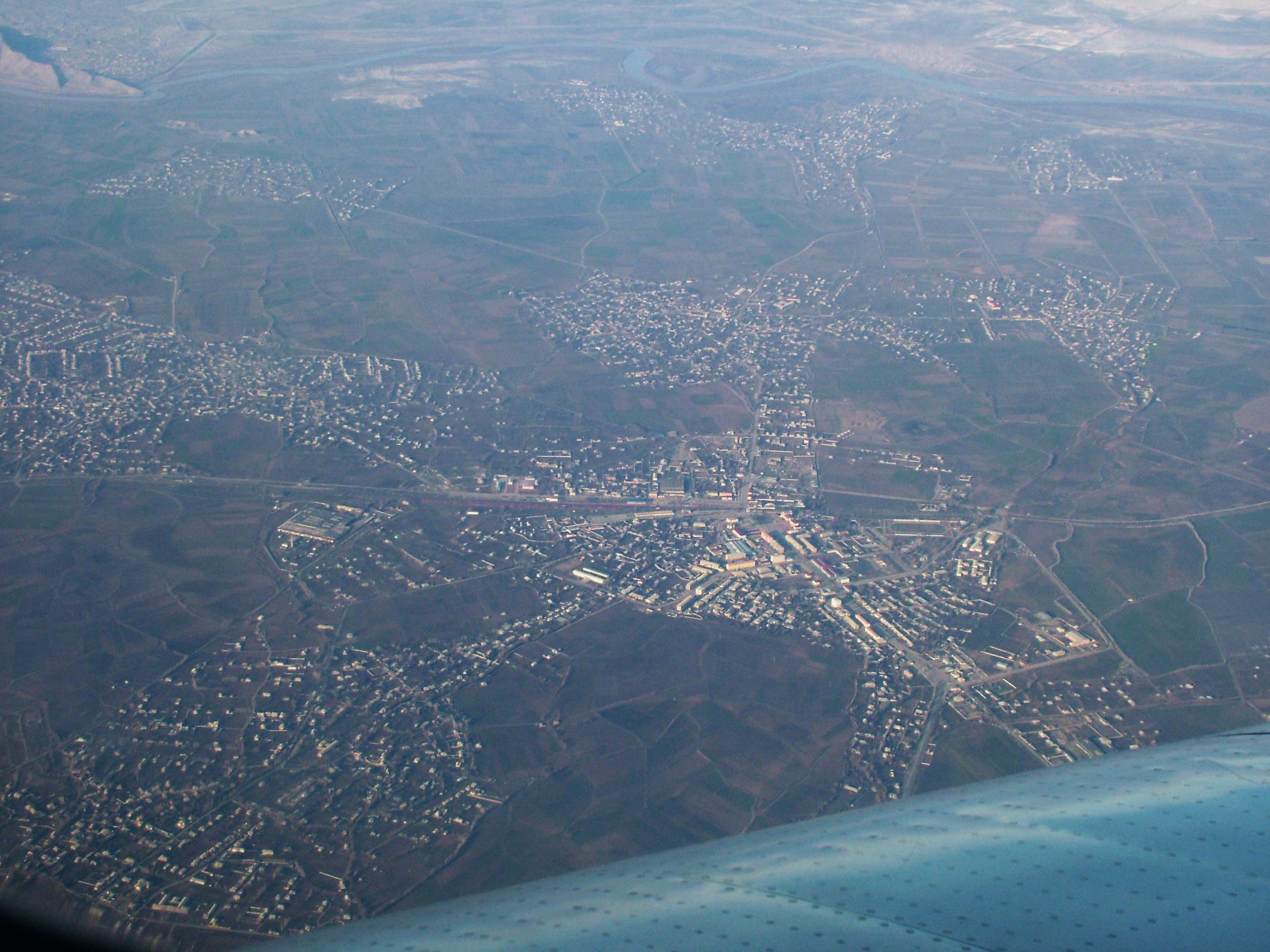
A view of Sharur from the air

There are 78 urban settlements in Azerbaijan with the official status of a city (Azerbaijani: şəhər):

- Aghdam
- Agdash
- Aghjabadi
- Agstafa
- Agsu
- Astara
- Aghdara
- Babek
- Baku – the capital and largest city of Azerbaijan
- Balakən
- Barda
- Beylagan
- Bilasuvar
- Dashkasan
- Fuzuli
- Gadabay
- Ganja
- Goranboy
- Goychay
- Goygol
- Hajiqabul
- Imishli
- Ismayilli
- Jabrayil
- Julfa
- Kalbajar
- Khachmaz
- Khankendi
- Khojavend
- Khirdalan
- Kurdamir
- Lankaran
- Lerik
- Masalli
- Mingachevir
- Nakhchivan
- Naftalan
- Neftchala
- Oghuz
- Ordubad
- Qabala
- Qakh
- Qazakh
- Quba
- Qubadli
- Qusar
- Saatlı (city)
- Sabirabad
- Shabran
- Shahbuz
- Shaki
- Shamakhi
- Shamkir
- Sharur
- Shirvan
- Siyazan
- Shusha
- Sumgait
- Tartar
- Tovuz
- Ujar
- Yardimli
- Yevlakh
- Zaqatala
- Zardab
- Zangilan

== Most populous Azerbaijani cities ==
List of ten cities, including the capital Baku, with the highest population in city proper in 2024.

Rank	Azerbaijani	City	Population	Image	Description
1	Bakı	Baku	2,344,900		Baku is the capital and largest city of Azerbaijan, as well as the largest city on the Caspian Sea. It is located 28 meters below sea level, which also makes it the lowest lying national capital in the world.
2	Sumqayıt	Sumgait	427,000		Sumgait is the second-largest city and seaport in Azerbaijan.
3	Gəncə	Ganja	330,700		Ganja is the third-largest city in Azerbaijan and the largest city outside the Baku metropolitan area.
4	Xırdalan	Khirdalan	195,700		Khirdalan is a city between Baku and Sumgait.
5	Mingəçevir	Mingachevir	102,900		Mingachevir is a city in the north of the country.
6	Naxçıvan	Nakhchivan	97,200		Capital city of the Autonomous Republic of Nakhchivan.
7	Şirvan	Shirvan	85,500		Shirvan is located along the Kura river.
8	Şəki	Shaki	65,300		Shaki is a city known for its rich history.
9	Yevlax	Yevlakh	65,100		
10	Lənkəran	Lankaran	51,600		Lankaran is a city in the south on the coast of the Caspian Sea.

== See also ==
- Administrative divisions of Azerbaijan
- List of geographic names of Iranian origin
- List of cities by country
- List of cities in Asia
- List of cities in Europe
