= List of largest currently operating tram and light rail transit systems =

The following is a list of largest currently operating tram and light rail transit systems.

== List ==
Nr	City	Country	Length	Stops	Lines	Ridership (million/year)	Fleet	Info year
1	Melbourne	Australia	250 km (160 mi)	1763	24	206	500	2018
2	Moscow	Russia	208 km (129 mi) (Note: This reference ("Евгений Михайлов: Обособление трамвайных путей положительно сказывается на регулярности движения наземного городского транспорта" [Yevgeny Mikhailov: The separation of tramways' positive impact on the reliability of urban transport traffic] (in Russian). Мосгортранс [Mosgortrans]. 17 March 2014.) quotes the 2014 single track length of Moscow's tram network to be 416 kilometres (258 mi) – for the purposes of this table, the double track system length of Moscow's tram network is assumed to be roughly half that figure, or approximately 208 kilometres (129 mi).)		44	220	825	2015
3	Saint Petersburg	Russia	205.5 km (127.7 mi)		41	312 (Note: Estimate)	781	2011
4	Cologne	Germany	198 km (123 mi)	233	12	217	382	2016 (2013 Nr. of vehicles)
5	Paris	France	196.6 km (122.2 mi)	283	15 (Note: As of March 2025, the network counts 10 tramway lines and 5 tram-train ones. All 15 lines have their own tracks independent from each other, there's no interlining. The circular T3 is split into two independent lines, T3a & T3b, each with their own terminus station where they meet. Two of the lines, T5 & T6, use Translohr single rail rubber-tyred trams. T6 features a tunnel section with two underground stations. T7's South & T10's North extensions will both also have tunneled sections and underground stations. The network is rapidly growing, with 4 newly built lines and 1 converted line since 2021, plus large extensions in various stages of development. It should exceed 250 km once all extensions currently being planned or built are completed.)	340	385 (+65 on order)	2025 (2019 ridership for 10 lines)
6	Berlin	Germany	193.6 km (120.3 mi)	803	22	197		2017
7	Milan	Italy	180.2 km (112.0 mi)	553 (Note: Some stations are used by several lines; this number is the sum of each line's stations counted separately. The true number ranges from 450 to 500.)	19 (Note: The network counts 17 urban lines and 2 interurban ones: one of the latter has been suspended since 2011 and is currently replaced by buses.)		493	2019
8	Vienna	Austria	177 km (110 mi)	1071	30	305	525	2013
9	Katowice urban area	Poland	175.5 km (109.1 mi) (Note: 240 km of double track plus 55.5 km of single track for a total route length of 175.5 km.)		32		307	2021
10	Gothenburg	Sweden	160 km (99 mi)	132	13 (1 heritage tram line)	140	263	2018
11	Budapest	Hungary	156.85 km (97.46 mi)	671	40 (Note: normal: 35; night: 1; heritage: 3; temporary: 1)	430	520	2018
12	Sofia	Bulgaria	154 km (96 mi) (Note: This reference ("Urban transport – History of Sofia Trams". Sofia Urban Mobility Center. 2015.) quotes the 2006 single track length of Sofia's tram network to be 308 kilometres (191 mi) – for the purposes of this table, the double track system length of Sofia's tram network is assumed to be roughly half that figure, or approximately 154 kilometres (96 mi).)	165	15		176	2006
13	Los Angeles	United States	153.7 km (95.5 mi)	87	4	51.4	337	2023
13	Brussels	Belgium	150.4 km (93.5 mi)	298	18	129.4	402	2024
14	Dallas	United States	150 km (93 mi)	65	4	28	163	2023
15	Leipzig	Germany	146 km (91 mi)	522	15	134	245	2016
16	Prague	Czech Republic	145.7 km (90.5 mi)	596	31	373	857	2017
17	Bucharest	Romania	141 km (88 mi)	598	24	322	483	2013
18	Kyiv	Ukraine	139.9 km (86.9 mi)		21	174	523	2016
19	Dresden	Germany	134.3 km (83.5 mi)	259	12	145		2018
20	Stuttgart	Germany	131 km (81 mi)	201	17	170	204	2016
21	Warsaw	Poland	131.5 km (81.7 mi) (Note: The Annual Report 2020 lists the total single track length of Warsaw's tram network to be 303 kilometres (188 mi), of which 40 kilometres (25 mi) is the length of tracks at depots. For the purposes of this table, the double track system length of Warsaw's tram network is assumed to be roughly half the difference, or approximately 263 kilometres (163 mi).)		26	248	772	2023
22	Hanover	Germany	127 km (79 mi)	197	12	176		2016
23	Zürich	Switzerland	122.7 km (76.2 mi)		14	212	258	2018
24	The Hague	Netherlands	117 km (73 mi)	239	10	68	197 (Note: 2024)	2016
25	Zagreb	Croatia	116 km (72 mi)	256	15 (day) + 4 (night)	214	204	2008
26	Helsinki	Finland	110.5 km (68.7 mi)	310	12	41.8	125	2022
27	Philadelphia	United States	110.1 km (68.4 mi)	>100	8	24.3		2023
28	San Diego	United States	105 km (65 mi)	62	4 (1 heritage tram line)	38	131	2023
29	Manchester	United Kingdom	103 km (64 mi)	99	8	44.3	147	2020
30	Seattle	United States	101.4 km (63.0 mi)	50	3	30.8	214	2024
31	Arad	Romania	100.17 km (62.24 mi)	118	16	43.3	138	2014
32	Portland	United States	97 km (60 mi)	94	5	38.4	145	2023
33	Denver	United States	94.1 km (58.5 mi)	57	6	24.6		2023
34	Turin	Italy	88.5 km (55.0 mi)	198	8+2	200	4	2024
35	Lyon	France	83.7 km (52.0 mi)	103	8	98	107 (Note: 2020)	2019
36	Toronto	Canada	82 km (51 mi)	708	11	64	247	2012
37	Amsterdam	Netherlands	80.5 km (50.0 mi)	500	13	130	200	
38	Munich	Germany	80.4 km (50.0 mi)	172	13	105	113	2013

== See also ==
- List of town tramway systems
- List of tram and light rail transit systems
- List of largest tram and light rail transit systems ever
- History of tram and light rail transit systems by country
