= East Windsor =

East Windsor may refer to:

- East Windsor, Connecticut, a town in Hartford County
- East Windsor, Massachusetts, part of the town of Windsor in Berkshire County
- East Windsor Township, New Jersey, a township in Mercer County
- East Windsor, Ontario, Canada, the name of Ford City from 1928 until 1935 when it was amalgamated with Windsor
