= List of largest tram and light rail transit systems =

This is a list of the largest town tramway systems that have ever operated. Town tramway systems include all light rail, tram, interurban, streetcar, or other comparable modes of public transport which uses rails while mainly traveling among other traffic. All figures reflect the system at its height. To keep the list manageable, only systems with over 90km of track are included.

== List ==
System	Country	Length (km)	Notes	Closed
Vicinal tramway	Belgium	4,095	Networks between towns ceased in the 1970s, but one line (the Coast Tram) remains in operation.	
Streetcars in Montreal	Canada	500	Network dismantled in 1959 in favour of buses.	1959
Streetcars in Toronto	Canada	405+	most dismantled throughout the opening and extension of the subway system. 83km as of 2025	
Streetcars in Los Angeles	USA	1,770+	Composed of Los Angeles Railway and Pacific Electric.	1963
Chicago Surface Lines	USA	1,600+		1958
Trams in Paris	France	1,111	Original network stopped service in 1938. Since then, a new 196.6 km network has been built.	
Trams in Buenos Aires	Argentina	875	Still operating some lines.	
Trams in Saint Petersburg	Russia	700+	205 km of lines remain.	
Boston Elevated Railway	USA	677	West End Street Railway system under lease. Remaining lines are operated by the MBTA within the Green Line system	
Detroit United Railway	USA	640		1956
Trams in Berlin	Germany	624	194 km of lines remain.	
Tram in Moscow	Russia	560	208 (Note: This reference ("Евгений Михайлов: Обособление трамвайных путей положительно сказывается на регулярности движения наземного городского транспорта" [Yevgeny Mikhailov: The separation of tramways' positive impact on the reliability of urban transport traffic] (in Russian). Мосгортранс [Mosgortrans]. 17 March 2014.) quotes the 2014 single track length of Moscow's tram network to be 416 kilometres (258 mi) – for the purposes of this table, the double track system length of Moscow's tram network is assumed to be roughly half that figure, or approximately 208 kilometres (129 mi).)	
Trams in London	UK	523	All trams removed by 1952, but a much smaller modern tramway network, Tramlink, reintroduced in 2000.	1952
SFMTA	USA	489	Length in 1921.	
Manchester Corporation Tramways	UK	470	Length could relate to all track in current Greater Manchester including neighbouring operators (but with much inter-running/shared routes). Others suggest about 470 km. All trams removed by 1950s, but modern light rail, Manchester Metrolink introduced 1992.	1949
Market Street Railway	USA	457		1944
Trams in Rio de Janeiro	Brazil	433		
Streetcars in Washington, D.C.	USA	320		1962
Trams in Vienna	Austria	318	Today 172 km remain.	
Sacramento Northern	USA	295		1941
Trams in Sydney	Australia	291		1961
San Diego Electric Railway	USA	266		1949
Trams in Melbourne	Australia	256	Current largest tram system by route length.	
Glasgow Corporation Tramways	UK	227.51		1962
Trams in Oslo	Norway	200+	Today 94 km remain, several lines have been ripped out and high frequency buses are run on the lines instead and five lines have had their rights of way used for the current metrosystem.	
Trams in Brisbane	Australia	199		1969
Cologne Stadtbahn	Germany	194.8		
Trams in Milan	Italy	181.8	Data as of 2017. The network was longer in the past.	
Silesian Tramways	Poland	178		
Tidewater Southern Railway	USA	137		
Trams in Geneva	Switzerland	170	The network was reduced to only one surviving line in the 1960s. It has been re-expanding since then, back to over 40 km.	
Trams in Budapest	Hungary	158		
Trams in Sofia	Bulgaria	154		
Trams in Leipzig	Germany	148		
Peninsular Railway	USA	146.6		
Trams in Tashkent	Uzbekistan	146.5	As of 2026, a new tram system is being built in Tashkent.	2016
Trams in Prague	Czech Rep.	145.7	As of 2019, the Prague tram network operates 882 tram vehicles.	
Trams in Bucharest	Romania	144		
Liverpool Corporation Tramways	UK	140		1957
Trams in Kyiv	Ukraine	139.9		
Trams in Brussels	Belgium	139		
Trams in Dresden	Germany	134.3		
Trams in Munich	Germany	134		
Trams in Warsaw	Poland	132		
Trams in Stuttgart	Germany	131		
Trams in Hanover	Germany	127		
Birmingham Corporation Tramways	UK	129.6		1953
Central California Traction Company	USA	126		
Trams in Lodz	Poland	124.1		
Tram in Zürich	Switzerland	122		
Trams in Greater Cairo	Egypt	120		2019
Trams in Zagreb	Croatia	116		
Trams in Adelaide	Australia	113	As of 2024, only 15 km remain.	
Visalia Electric Railroad	USA	109		
Tokyo Toden	Japan	106.5	12.2 km of lines remain.	
Key System	USA	106		1959
Dublin tramways	Ireland	97	No original tramways still exist, but modern light rail, the Luas, was introduced in 2004 and operates 42 km of track.	1959
Trams in Gothenburg	Sweden	95		
Trams in Kraków	Poland	97		
Trams in Christchurch	New Zealand	86.1	A new heritage loop was built totalling 3.9 km.	1954
Pittsburgh Railways	USA	975.2	Replaced with a much smaller light rail network still in use today. As of 2026, only 42.2 km remain.	

== See also ==
- List of town tramway systems
- List of tram and light rail transit systems
- List of largest currently operating tram and light rail transit systems
- History of tram and light rail transit systems by country
