= Windsor, Ontario Streetcar System =

Canadian public transit system (1886–1937)

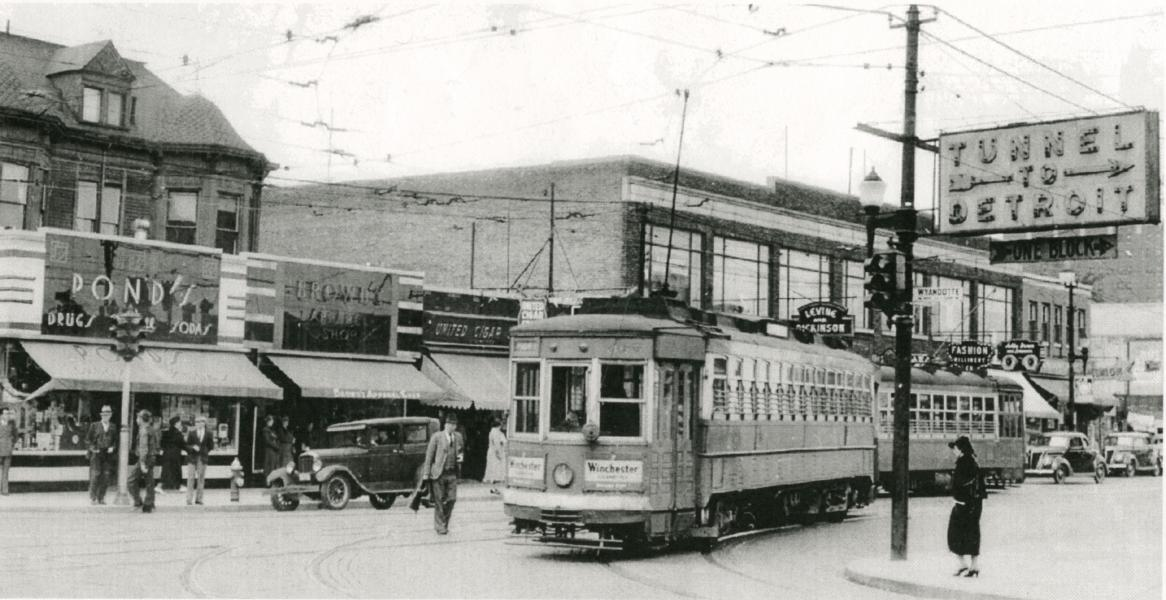
Streetcars in downtown Windsor in 1938, at the intersection of Ouellette Avenue and Wyandotte Street.

Windsor, Ontario was the first Canadian city with an electric street car system, which was introduced in 1886. Other Canadian cities soon followed suit, with St. Catharines in 1887 and Toronto in 1889. By World War I, nearly 50 Canadian cities had streetcar systems in place. By the time Windsor's streetcar system was dismantled in 1937, the system's scale was extensive and it serviced all 5 of the major riverfront communities of Windsor, Ford City (East Windsor), Sandwich, Walkerville and Ojibway.

== Beginnings ==
The streetcar system adopted by the city of Windsor and surrounding towns was developed by Charles J. Van Depoele. Van Depoele had immigrated to Detroit, Michigan from Belgium in 1874 to develop his electric system. Windsor was the first city to adopt Van Depoele's system, as well as the first in Canada to have any type of electric streetcar system. Prior to the electric cars, a horse-drawn streetcar system had been in place since 1872. The new railway began development under two companies, the Windsor-Walkerville Street Railway Company and the Windsor-Sandwich Street Railway Company until the two merged in 1891 to later become the Sandwich, Windsor and Amherstburg Railway (S.W. & A.R.). Van Depoele's electric streetcar first ran in Windsor on June 6, 1886, servicing the small town nestled south of the Detroit River.

== Expansion ==
Although initially the track spanned only a small portion of Windsor along the Windsor-Detroit waterfront on Riverside Drive, the S.W.& A.R. began expanding its service southward with an extension along Ouellette Avenue in 1893. The track started at the international ferry landing and went south, providing access to a popular race track, while simultaneously encouraging population growth south of the Detroit River where transportation was becoming readily available.

The service began expanding from the small city of Windsor outward to the east and to the west to the towns of Sandwich, Walkerville, and East Windsor. Population was expanding in these areas largely due to the introduction of big industries in Windsor. Walkerville began expanding due to the Hiram Walker distillery and East Windsor because of the introduction of a Ford Factory in 1904.

Subsequently, the S.W. & A.R. began expanding its track to these areas and to areas of dense population growth, creating access to much of the city and surrounding areas. People followed the track line, and the track line followed the people. Many Windsorites did not own automobiles, and found the streetcar a viable alternative to purchasing a new car. By 1921, the track had expanded to the towns of Amherstburg and Tecumseh at each end, measuring 37 miles in total.

A second interurban electric rail line, the Windsor Essex and Lakeshore Hallway Company (commonly known as the Windsor, Essex & Lake Shore or WE&LS), connected Windsor with Essex, Kingsville and Leamington along with smaller communities inbetween those town centers.

As the automobile began rising in popularity and lowering in price, the use of the streetcars began to decline, despite the steady increase in population seen in Windsor at that time. In 1934, the company went out of business and its rails were incorporated into the system of the S.W.& A.R.

== Disintegration ==
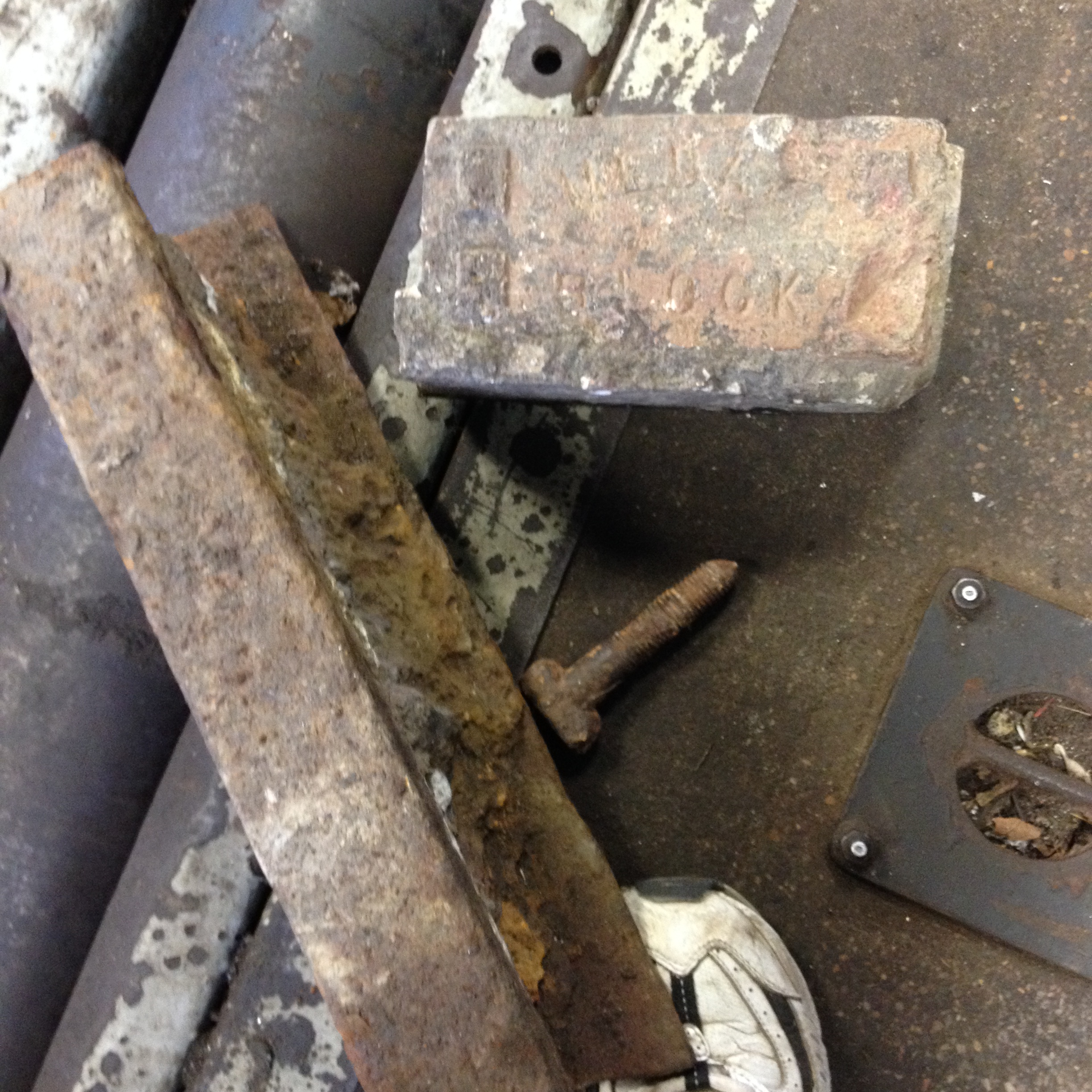
Piece of track and spike and the brick laid under track

The electric streetcar system provided an extensive and effective mode of transportation to the citizens of Windsor until the 1930s, when the Great Depression left the world in financial turmoil. The streetcars were expensive to repair and were beginning to deteriorate, and because of costs S.W. & A.R. began to cut down some of the less-travelled and less-profitable routes on the track. The newly comprised City of Windsor, consisting of the Sandwich, Windsor, Walkerville, and East Windsor communities in 1935, was unable to bear the financial burden of the S.W. & A.R.

Buses began to be considered a viable alternative to streetcars, because they were much less expensive to purchase. The S.W. & A.R. found that it would be less costly to purchase a set of buses than to repair the deteriorating rails. It was also thought by many that it was contradictory to continue using electric streetcars instead of automobiles in the automotive capital of Canada, where automobile ownership was rising and providing stiff competition to public transportation.

In 1937 the City decided to abandon the streetcar system in favour of a city bus system. The last Windsor electric streetcar ran on May 7, 1939. The rails were removed or paved over, and a city bus system has been in place ever since.

== Legacy ==
As of June 2025, short preserved sections of streetcar track from 1939 can be found at the intersection of Sandwich and Mill streets in a crosswalk on Sandwich Street. There are also the paved-over rails along Elm Avenue between Riverside Drive and University Avenue as two long, exceptionally straight grooves or cracks in the pavement. One of the original carhouses used by the Sandwich, Windsor and Amherstburg Railway still stands at 1220 University Avenue (formerly London Street).

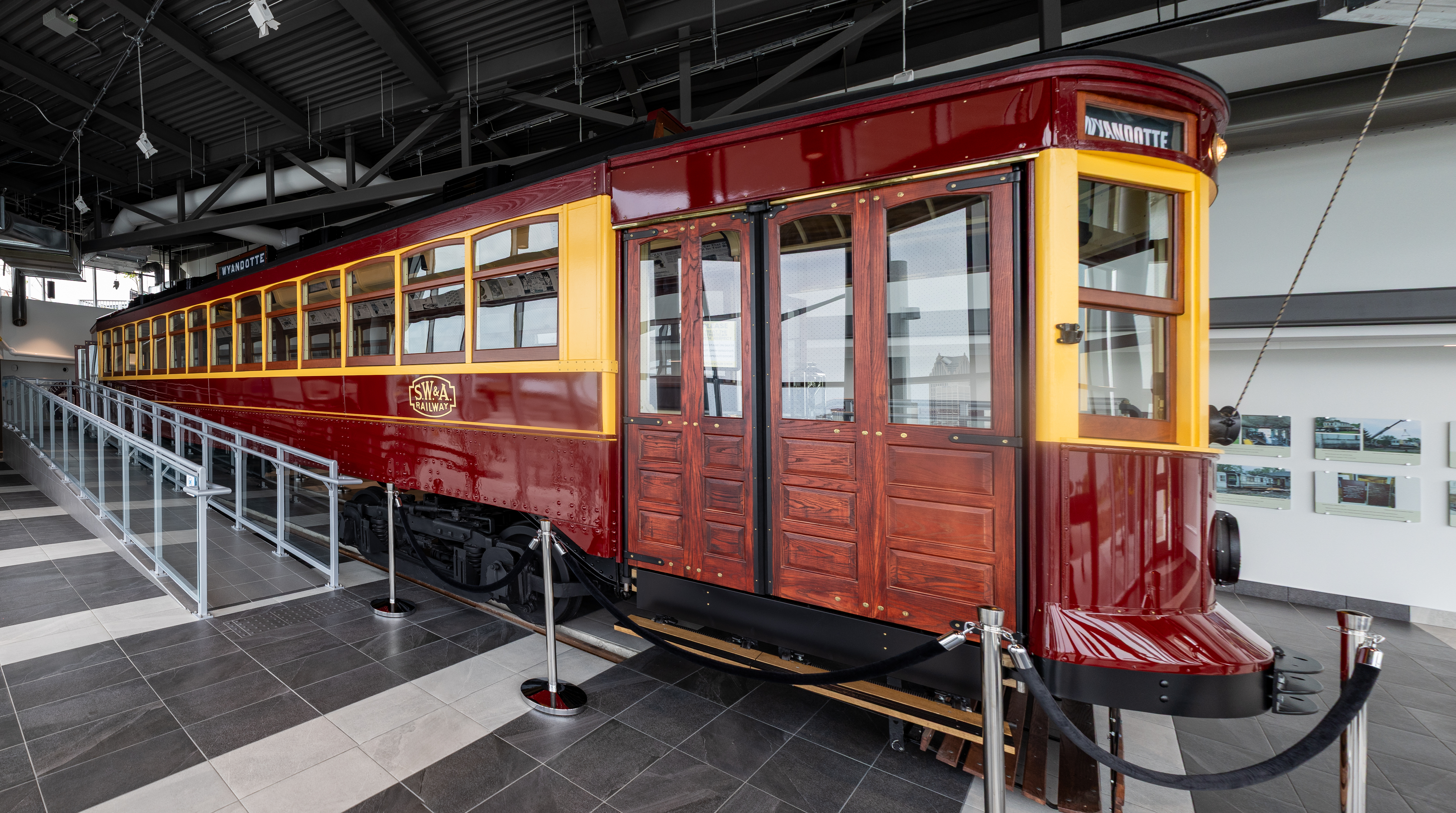
Restored streetcar No. 351

In 2015, a pair of restaurateurs found one of the original Windsor streetcars, No. 351, and had it hauled to the old carhouse on University Avenue for restoration and use as part of the restaurant they were planning to create in the carhouse building. Instead, streetcar No. 351 was donated to the City of Windsor and restored at RM Auto Restoration in Blenheim, Ontario. As of 2025, it is on static display at the Legacy Beacon pavilion on Windsor’s riverfront, as part of the Central Riverfront Implementation Plan. The streetcar was built in Cincinnati in 1918 and was one of four cars (numbered 351-354) purchased second-hand from Public Service of New Jersey in 1927. It was used in suburban service on the Sandwich, Windsor and Amherstburg Railway. The streetcar is 50 feet (15 m) long, weighs 24,688 pounds (11,198 kg) and had a smoking section.

== Reinstatement consideration ==
On November 29, 2019, CBC News, Windsor, asked Pat Delmore, Transit Windsor's executive director to answer a viewer's question as to when the agency would re-instate streetcars or Light Rail, in Windsor. Delmore pointed to Grand River Transit's 2019 reinstatement of Light Rail in Kitchener-Waterloo, pointing out that at 22 million rides per year it had almost three times Transit Windsor's 8 million rides per year. He said current ridership didn't justify the expense of reinstatement.

== See also ==
- Transit Windsor § 1872 to 1939 about the Sandwich, Windsor and Amherstburg Railway
