= History of tram and light rail transit systems by country =

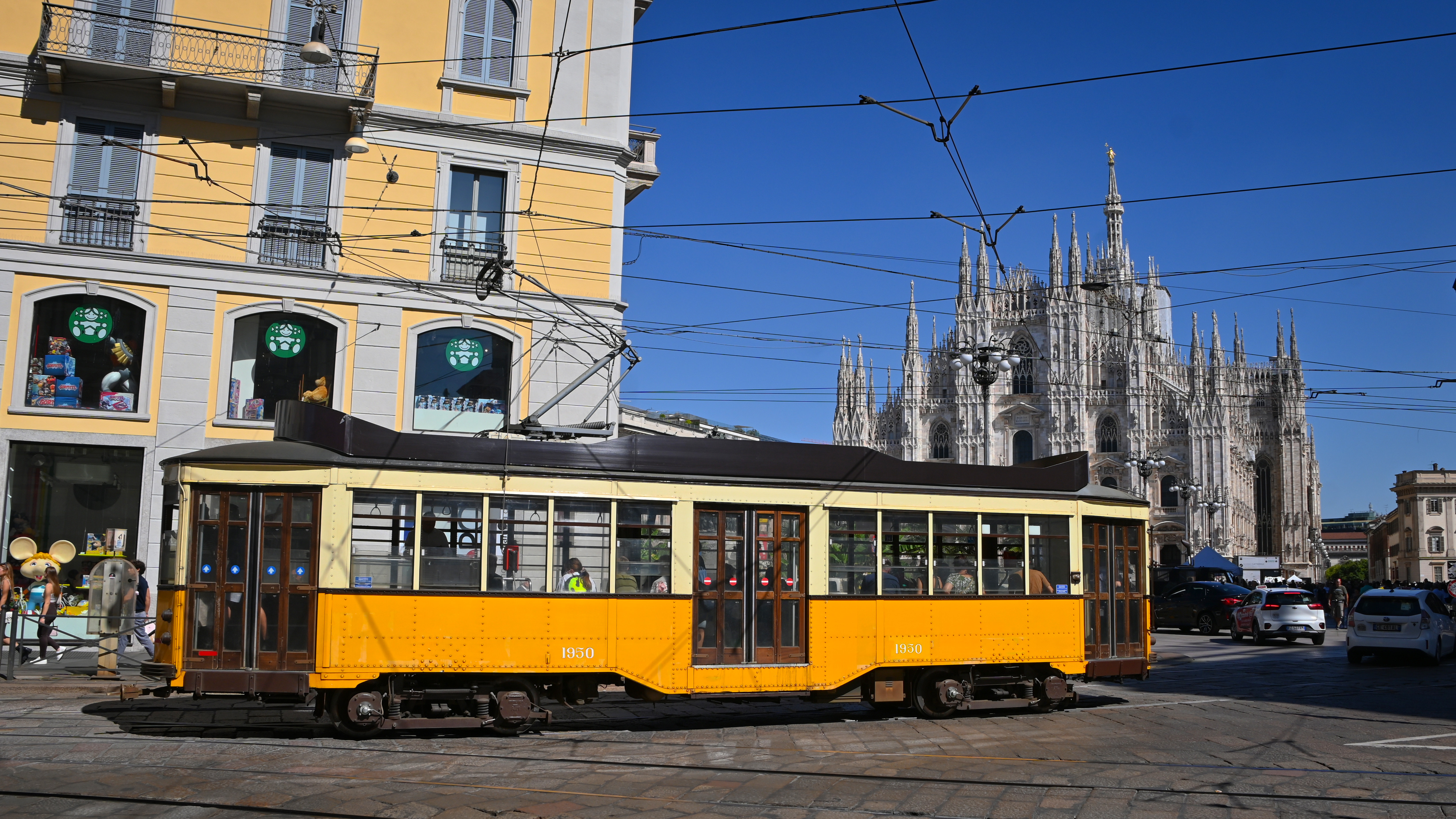
Peter Witt car Class 1500 tram in Milan

Although tram and Heritage streetcar systems date to the late 19th and early 20th centuries, many old systems were closed during the mid-20th century because of the advent of automobile (including bus) travel. This was especially the case in North America, but postwar reductions and shutdowns also occurred on British, French and other Western European urban rail networks. However, traditional tramway systems survived, and eventually even began to thrive from the late 20th century onward, some eventually operating as much as when they were first built over a century ago. Their numbers have been augmented by modern tramway or light rail systems in cities which had discarded this form of transport.

== Africa ==
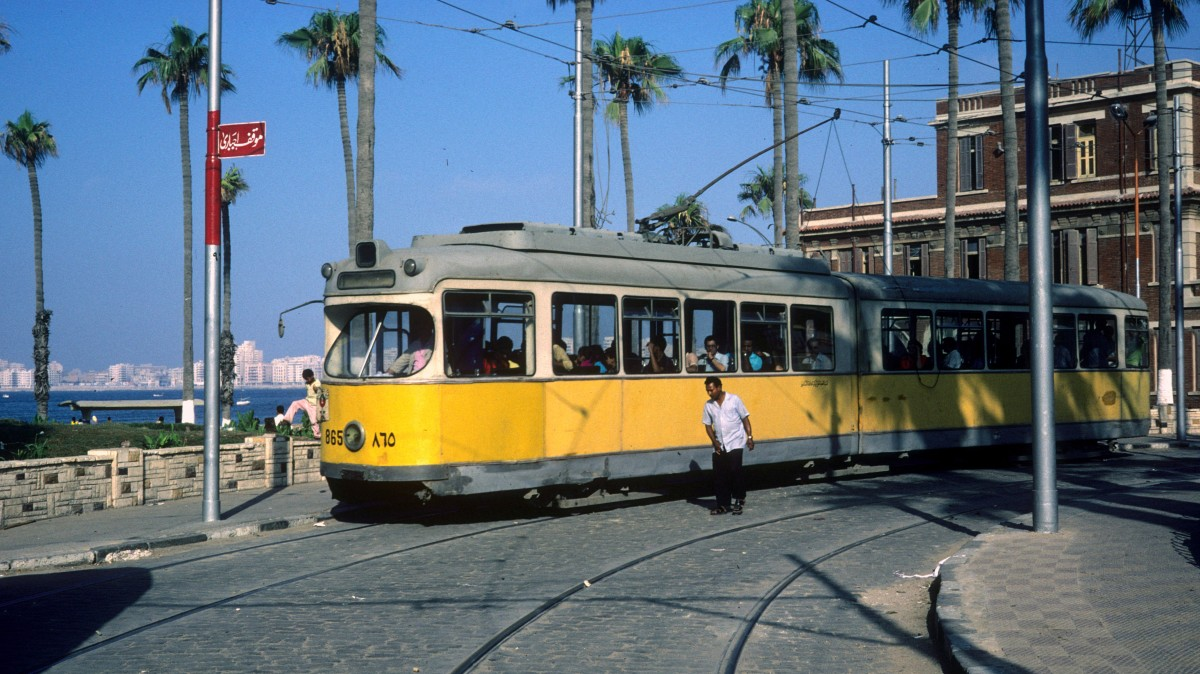
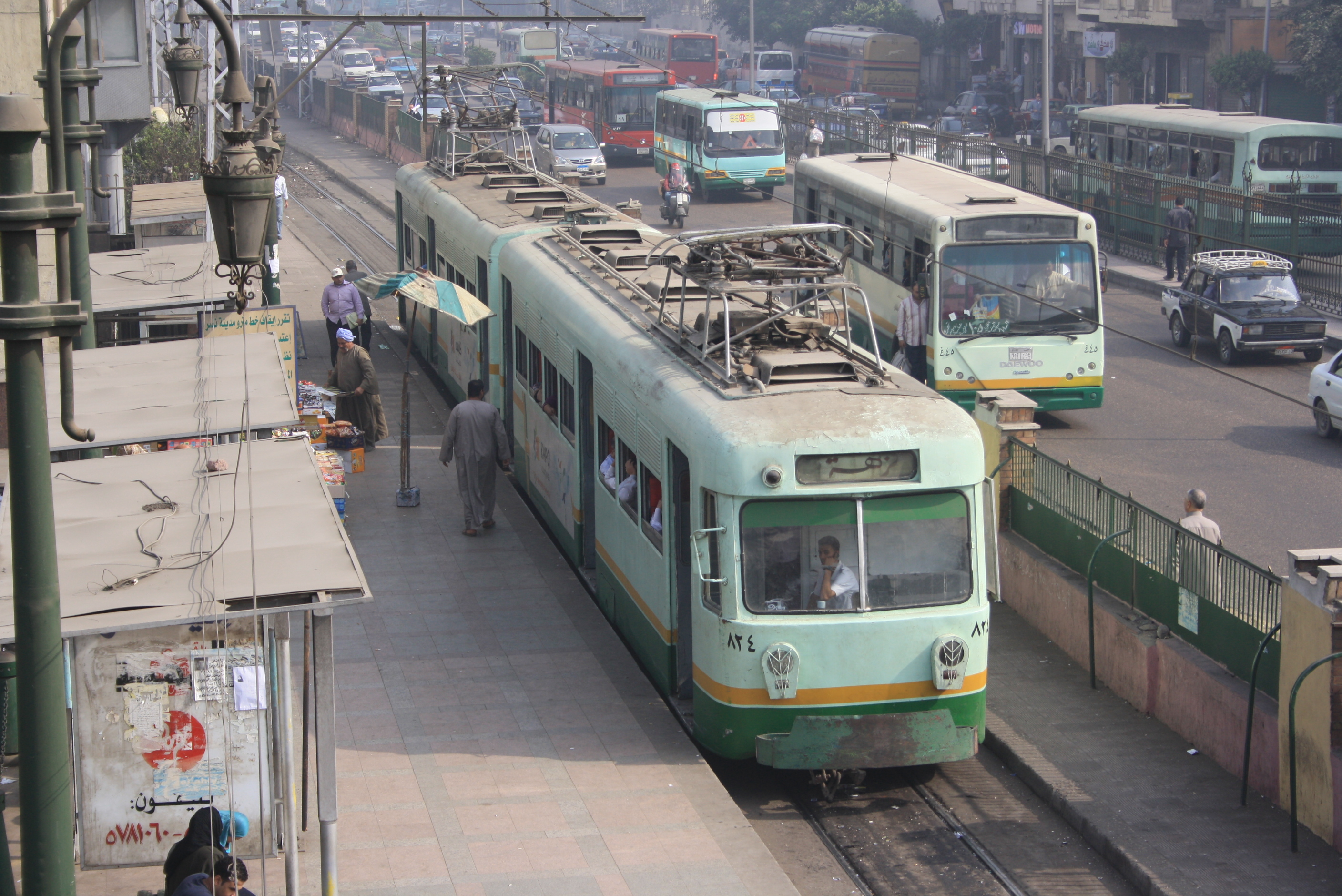
Left: former Copenhagen tram in service on Alexandria's urban tramway. – Right: the tram from Heliopolis terminates at Cairo's Rameses Station

=== Egypt ===
Although Cairo and Alexandria have historic systems which still exist, the once-extensive Cairo urban system is nearly defunct. The express tram line to and within Masr el-Djedida (Heliopolis) is still in operation. It is an example of a surviving interurban electric railway, the ancestor of light rail. A small 1970s system in the city of Helwan, 25 kilometres (16 mi) south, is still operational. Some of Cairo's cars are former Toronto Transit Commission PCC streetcars.

Alexandria's urban system and express routes to its eastern suburbs are still in operation. The urban system operates yellow cars (including some acquired from Copenhagen), primarily on street track. The express system (Ramleh routes) operates three-car blue trains, including some double-deck cars, on largely reserved track. There are also some dual-system routes.

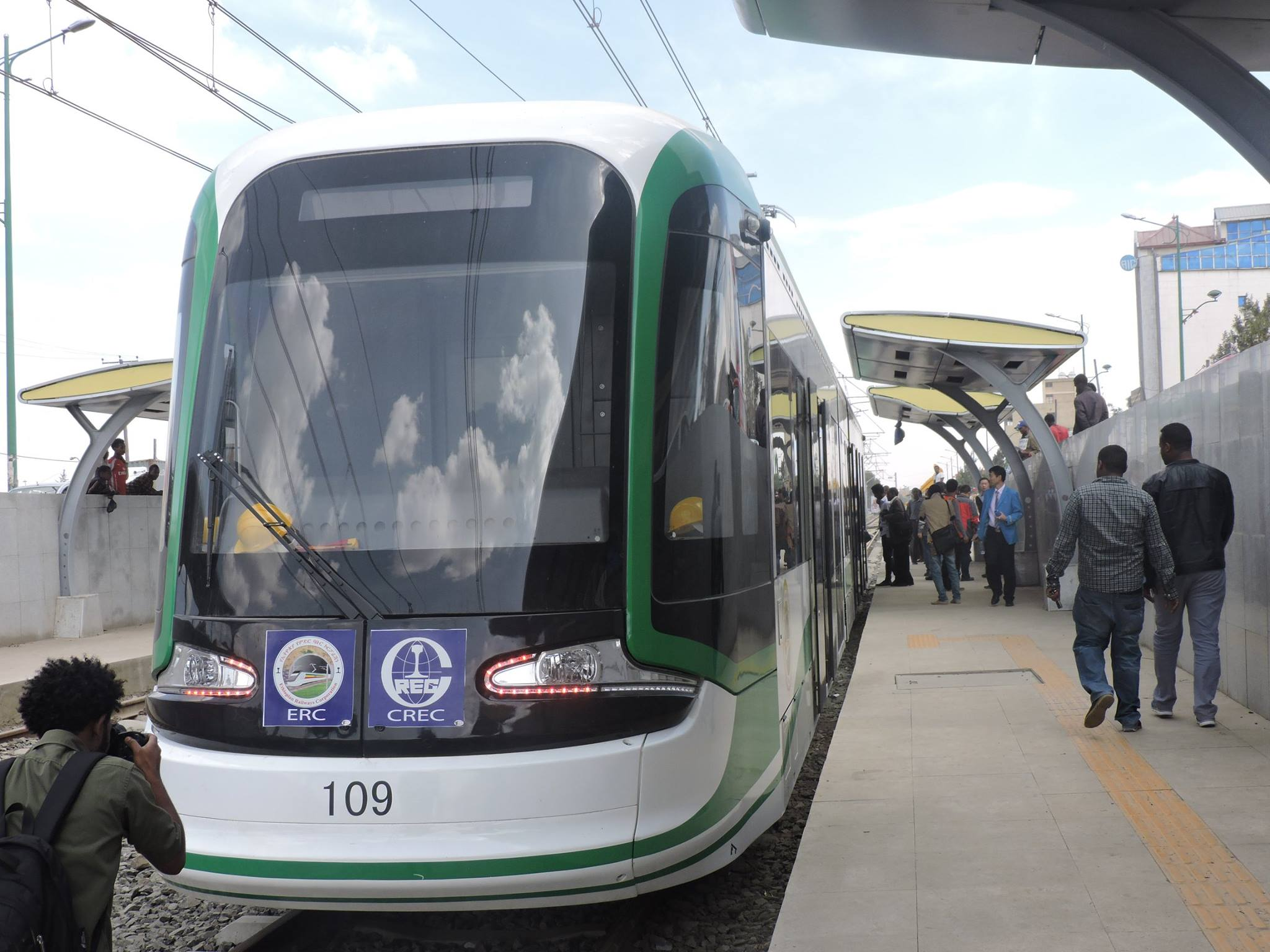
Addis Ababa Light Rail in Ethiopia

=== Ethiopia ===
In Ethiopia, construction by China Railway Group Limited was ongoing on Addis Ababa Light Rail in 2013. The Ethiopian Railway Corporation began construction of the 34.25-kilometre (21.3 mi) double-track electrified light rail project in December 2011, funded by the Export-Import Bank of China. Initially, the system would have two lines. The project was expected to take three years to complete, and trial operations began in early 2015. The systems is partially running on viaducts independent from other traffic.

=== Mauritius ===
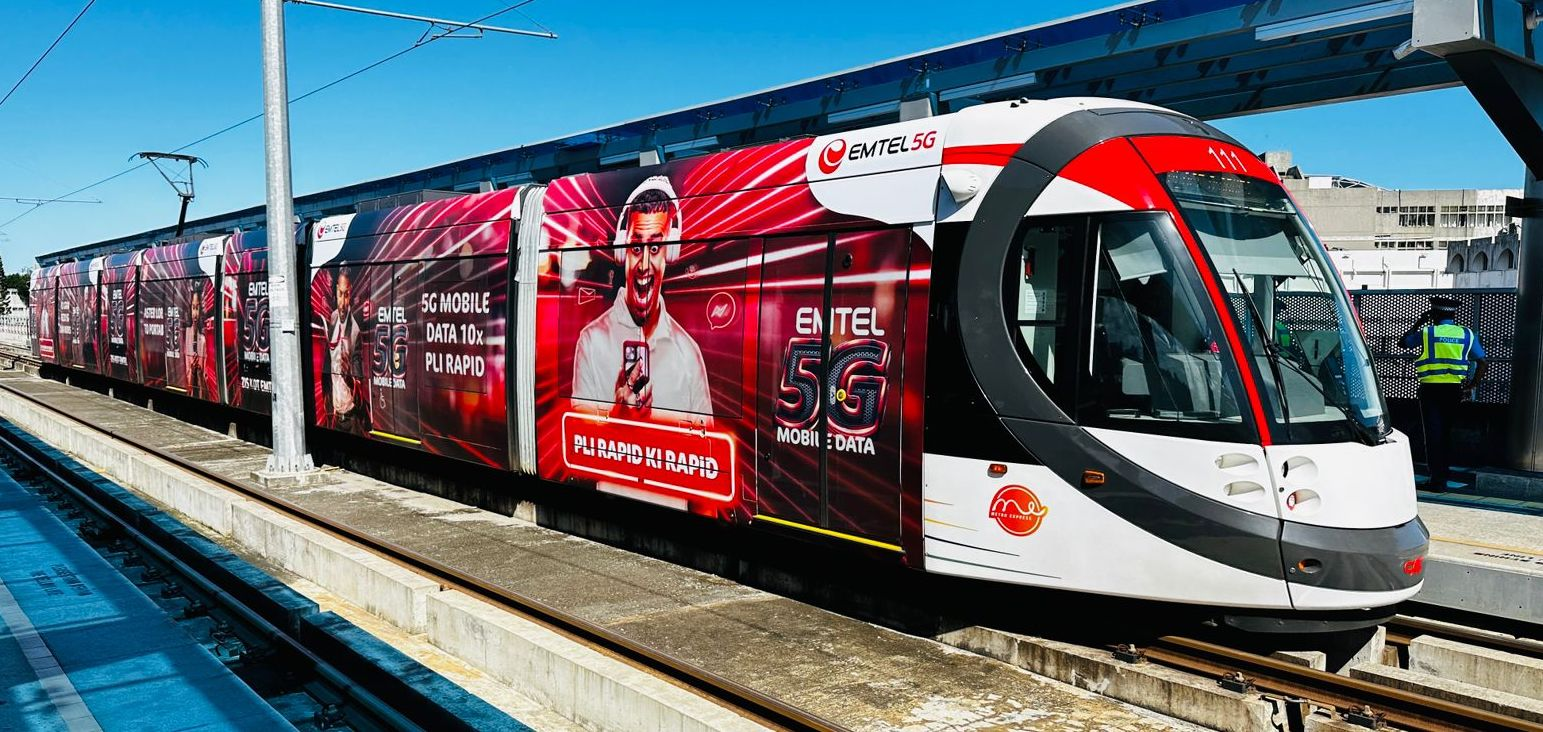
Tram in Rose-Hill Central Port Louis, Mauritius

In Mauritius, the Metro Express light rail system was inaugurated in 2019, and opened for general use in January 2020. Mauritius had been without a railway system following the closure of Mauritius Government Railways in the 1950s. The last passenger train ran on 31 March 1956, between Port Louis and Curepipe.

=== South Africa ===
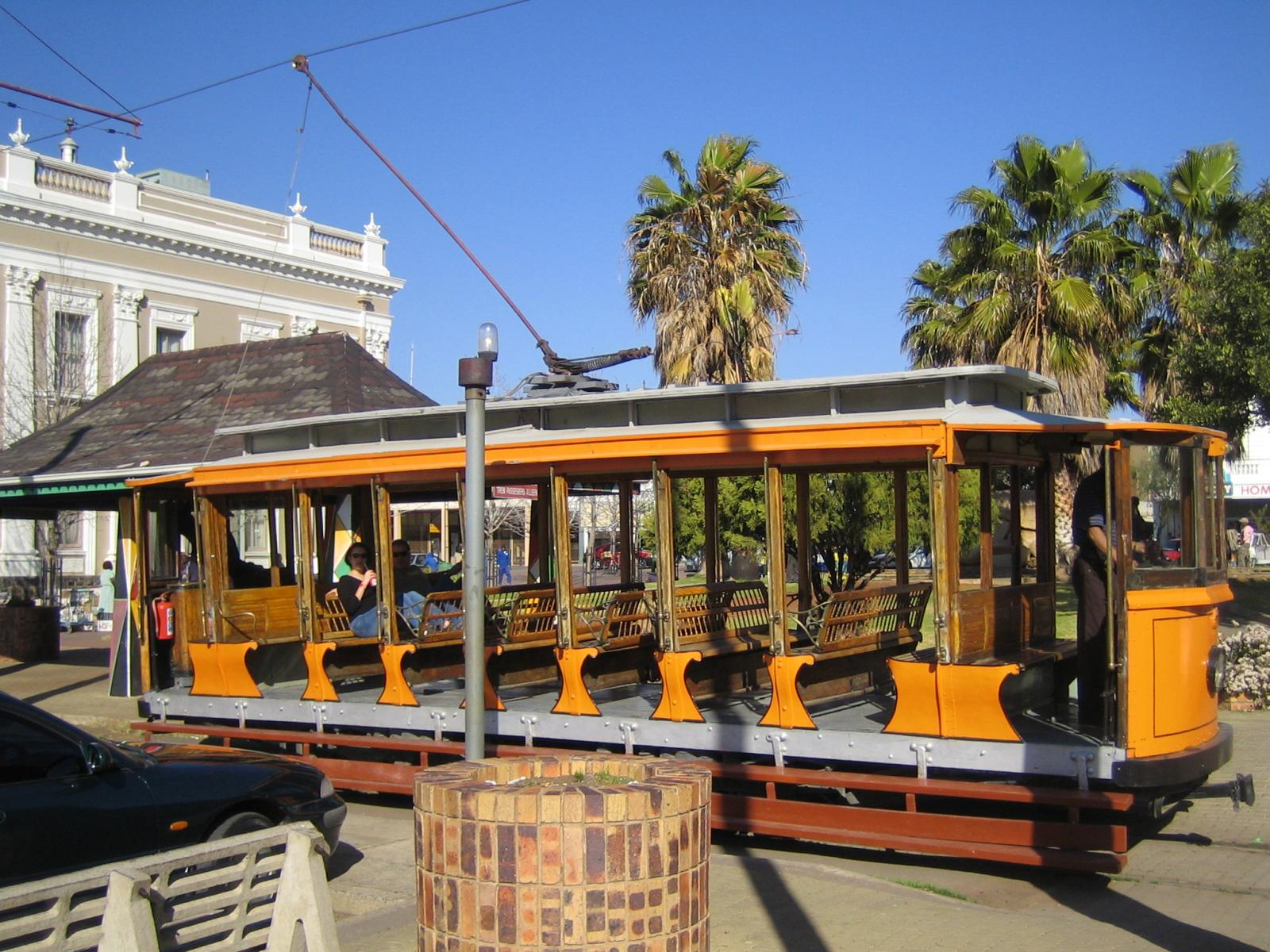
Historical tramway at Kimberley

Public transport in South Africa began in Cape Town in May 1801, when a weekly coach service to Simon's Town was announced. The Cape's first horse-drawn omnibus was introduced, based on George Shillibeer's model. The Cape Town and Green Point Tramway Company was formed in September 1862, and began operations on April 1, 1863.

Single- and double-deck horse-drawn trams were used. Cape Town's electric tram system initially had ten cars which were built in Philadelphia. Lady Sivewright, the wife of James Sivewright, opened the new system on August 6, 1896. At the time of Queen Victoria's Diamond Jubilee in 1897, Cape Town and its suburbs had 32 electric trams running on about 23 miles (37 km) of track. The new power station was inadequate, and had to be expanded. Tram service also existed in Pretoria, Durban and Johannesburg (where the Rand Tram, the suburban railway to Boksburg, opened in 1890), but were replaced by petrol, diesel and trolleybus systems by the early 1960s. A heritage tram line opened in 1985, on a 1.4-kilometre (0.87 mi) line 1 connecting City Hall with the Open Mine Museum, located on the De Beers Consolidated Mining Company premises, passing the "Big Hole" (Kimberley Mine) along the way. The Kimberley, Northern Cape tram had not operated "for some time and then it reopen on 2012.

=== Tunisia ===
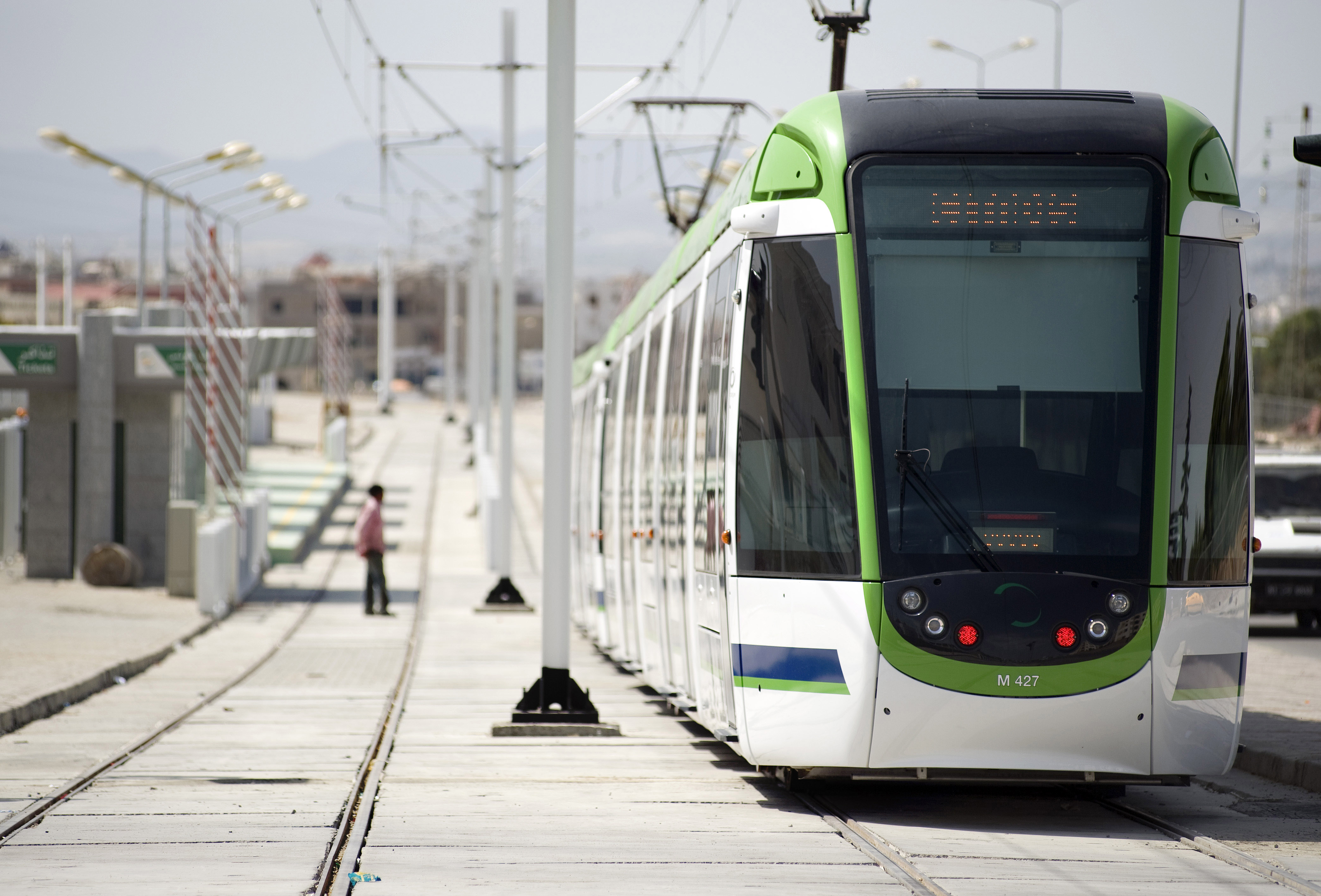
Tunis light rail in Tunisia

Tunis had traditional trams until about 1960. A new light-rail line began operation in 1985, and has been followed by other systems.

== Asia ==
=== Hong Kong ===
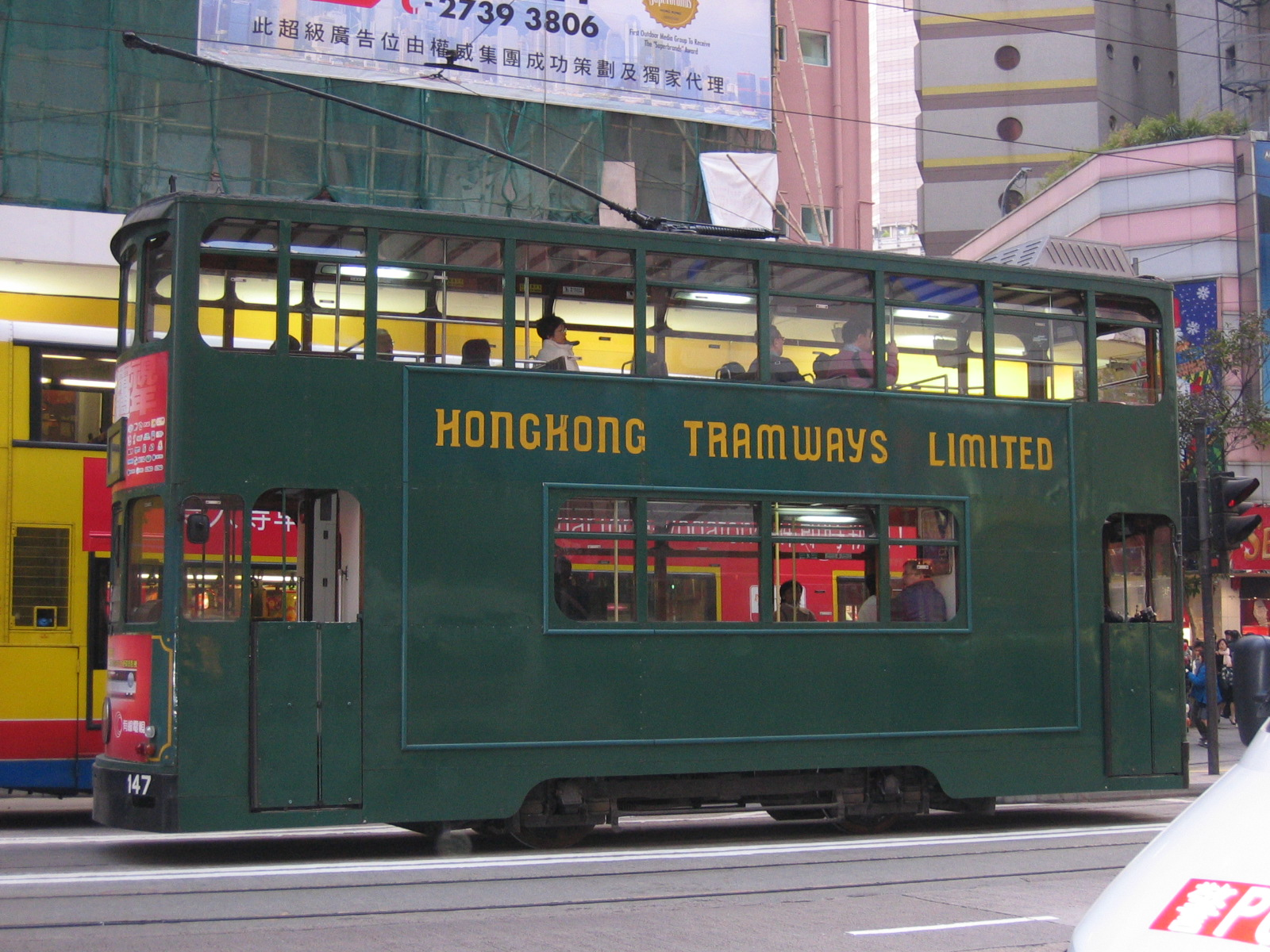
Double-deck trams continue to run in Hong Kong.

Hong Kong Tramways is one of few countries in the world that still operates double-decker trams on one of the oldest tram networks in Hong Kong. Hong Kong also features the Light Rail (MTR) that opened in 1988.

=== India ===
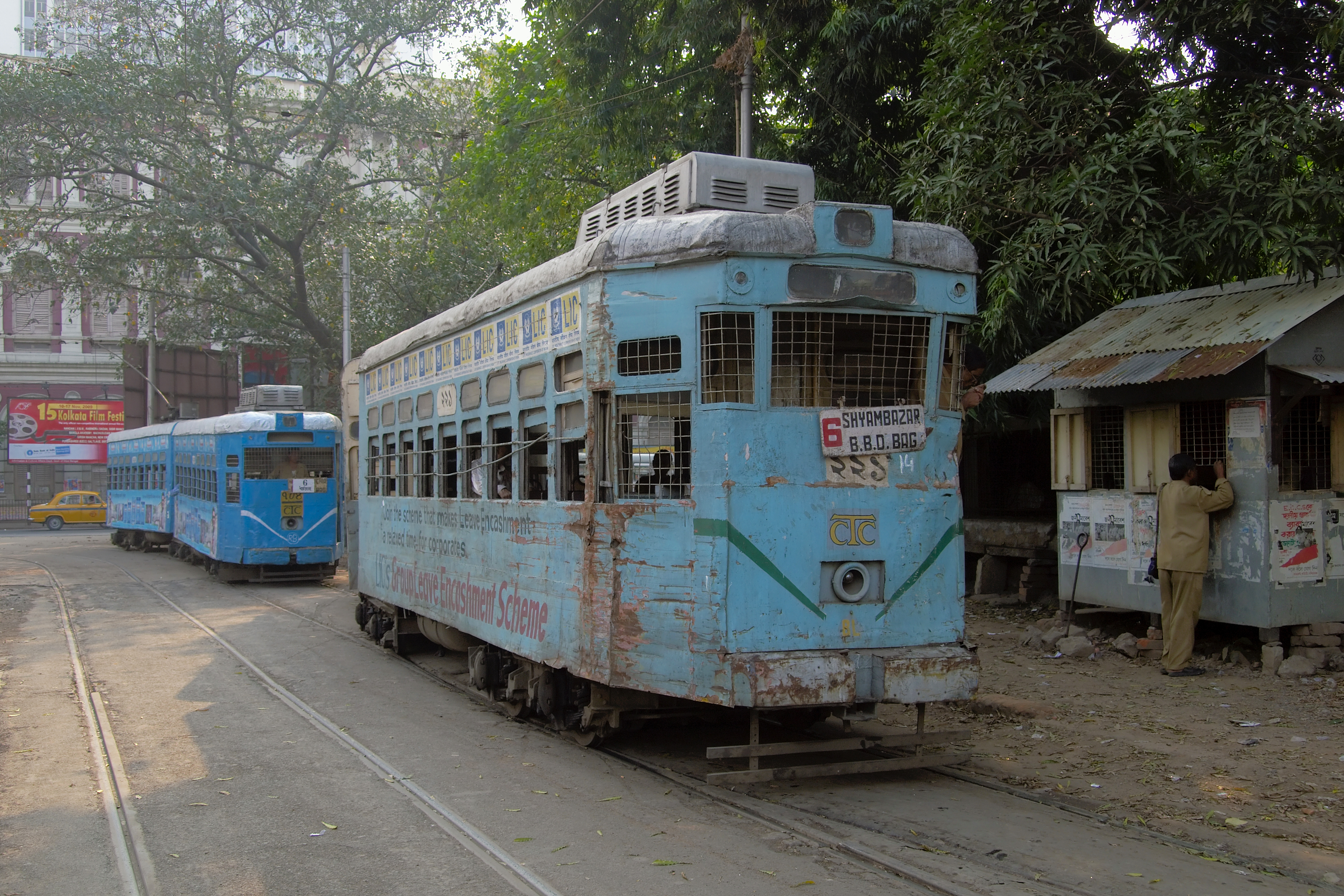
The tram network in Kolkata is Asia's oldest operating system.

Although tram systems were well-established in Asia at the start of the 20th century, they began a steady decline during the mid to late 1930s. The 1960s marked the end of the continent's dominance in public transportation, with most major systems closed and their equipment and rail sold for scrap; however, a number of systems continue to operate in the Russian Far East and Japan. Kolkata has Asia's oldest operating electric tram system which currently runs 3 routes, operating since 1902. There is rekindled interest in tram transport with surviving systems being upgraded and new systems being constructed. In China, several new systems have opened in the past few years with several more under construction.

=== Japan ===
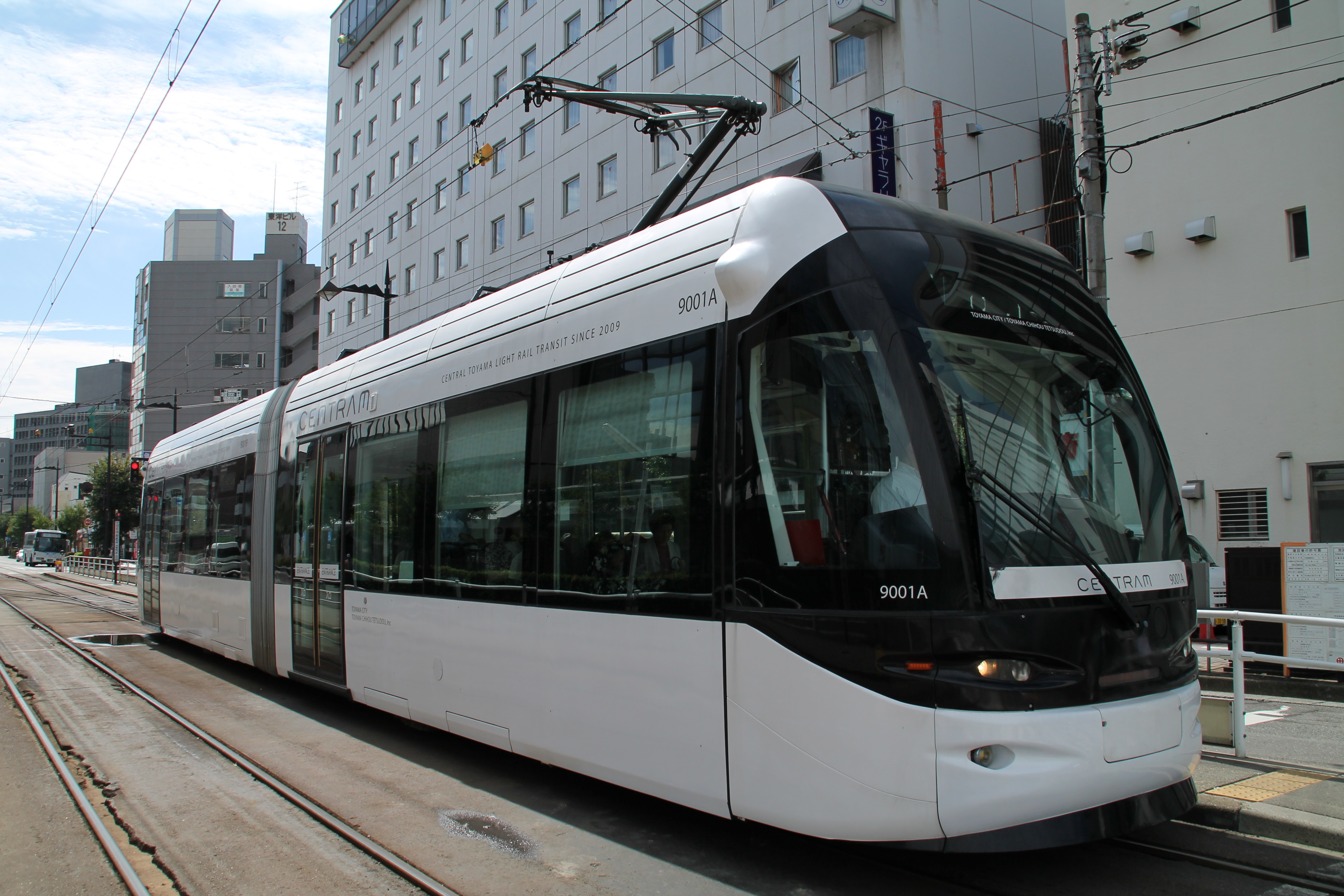
Toyama tram in Japan

The first Japanese tram line began in 1895 as the Kyoto Electric Railroad. The tram reached its zenith in 1932, when 82 rail companies operated 1,479 kilometres (919 mi) of track in 65 cities. Its popularity declined during the rest of the decade, a trend accelerated by the Pacific War, the occupation of Japan and the rebuilding years. Although many of the remaining tramways were shut down and dismantled in favor of auto, bus, and heavy rail service during the 1960s, A few tram systems remained in smaller Japanese cities.

== Europe ==
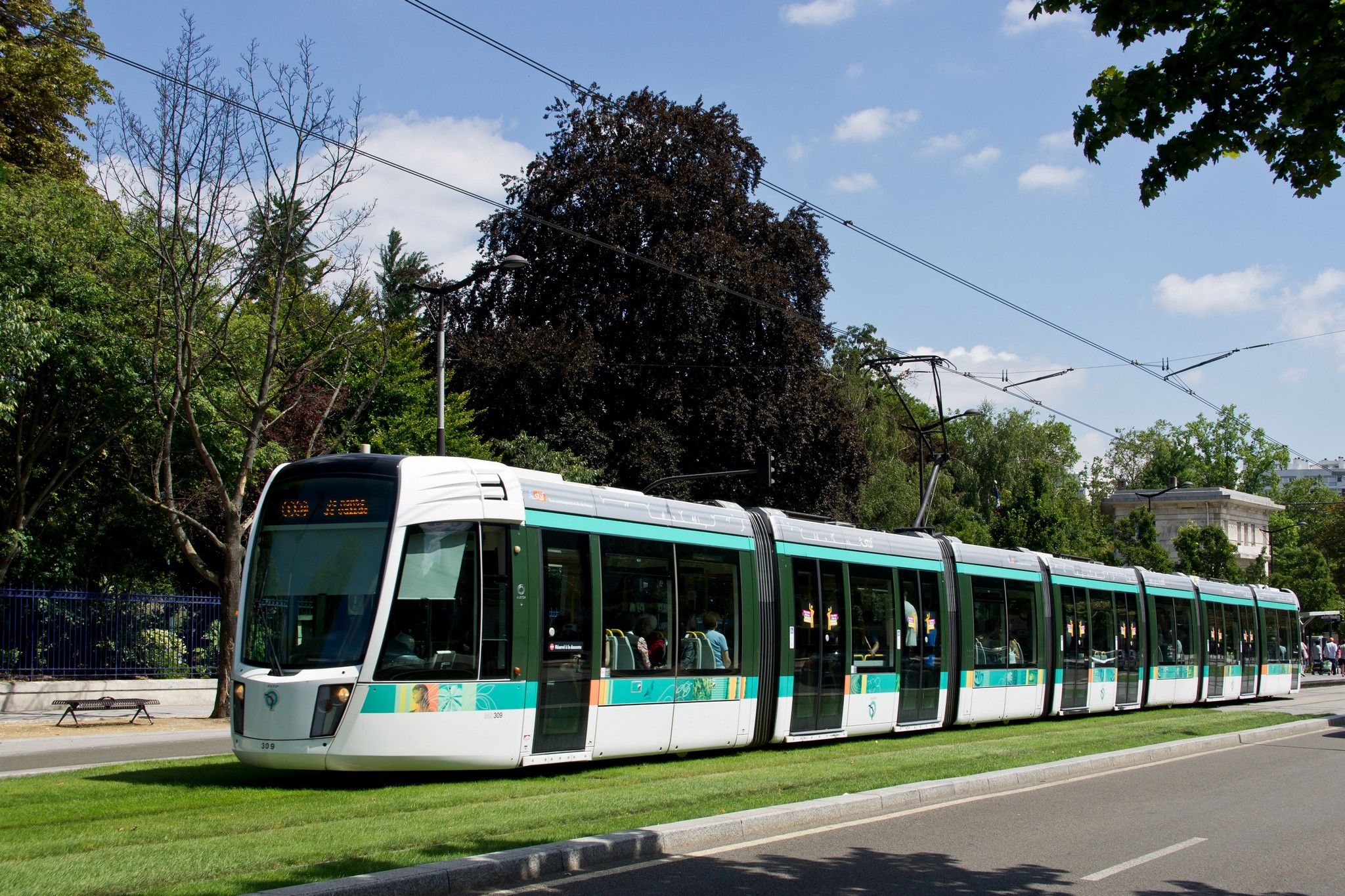
Tramways in Île-de-France

The first city in Europe to adopt the tram was Paris, conversely it was also the first European capital to abolish its tram network. After Paris, cities like Geneva and The Hague followed, both these have maintained their tram system into the 21st century. Much of the tramway infrastructure was lost during the mid-20th century in many European cities, although not on the same scale as in other parts of the world (such as North America). Most of Eastern Europe retains their tramway systems, but some cities are reconsidering their transport priorities. Some Western European cities are rehabilitating, upgrading, expanding and reconstructing old tramway lines, and many Western European towns and cities are building new tram lines.

== Central America ==
=== Guatemala ===
Metro Riel is the name given to the light rail system proposed for Guatemala City.

=== Nicaragua ===
Managua LRT is the name to the given light rail system proposed for Managua.

=== Panama ===
Trams in Panama predate the country's founding; electric tram service began in 1893 in Panama City, in what was then Colombia. In 1913, cable cars began operating in Colon. Panama Metro began operating the first subway in mainland Central America, a 12-station system, on April 5, 2014.

== North America ==
In North America (especially the United States), trams are generally known as streetcars or trolleys; a "tram" is a tourist trolley, an aerial tramway or a people mover. Streetcar lines were largely torn up during the mid-20th century for a variety of financial, technological and social reasons, and comparably few exist today. The Sistema de Tren Eléctrico Urbano in Guadalajara, Mexico has the highest annual ridership among light rail systems in North America.

=== Canada ===
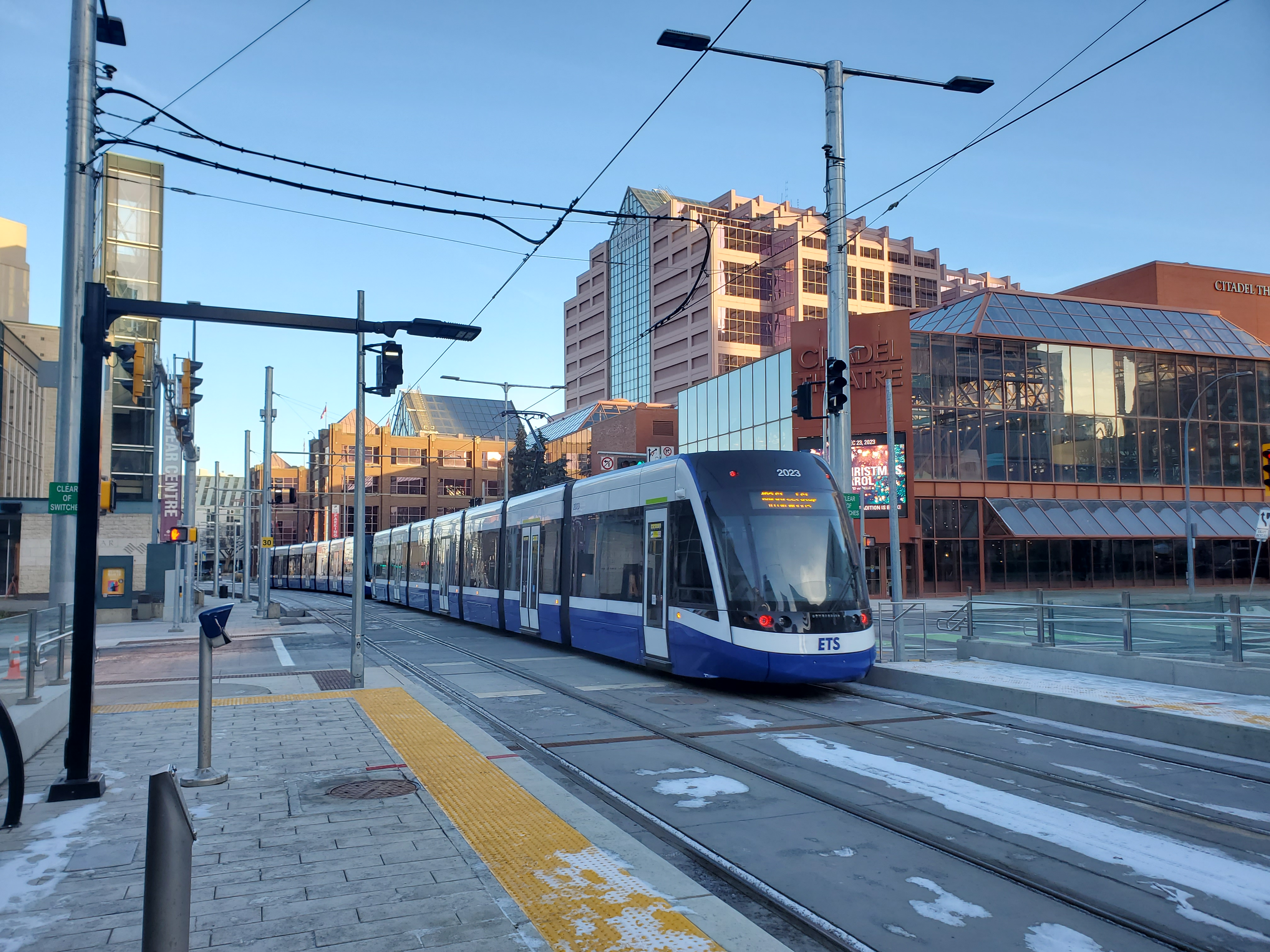
Edmonton transit service valley line Canada

Most of the country's streetcar systems disappeared after World War II, giving way to buses:

- Windsor (1937)
- Kitchener Public Utilities Commission (1946)
- North Vancouver (1947)
- Nova Scotia Light and Power Company, Limited, Halifax (1949)
- Edmonton Radial Railway, Saskatoon Municipal Railway and Hamilton Street Railway (1951)
- Vancouver (1955)
- Ottawa Transportation Commission and Montreal Tramways Company (1959)

Toronto's system grew with the abandonment of streetcar operations in the United States and the rest of Canada, as the Toronto Transit Commission purchased cars from many former operators. The Toronto system grew to become the largest streetcar system in the Americas.

During the late 20th century, several cities installed light rail systems (partially along the same corridors as the streetcars). Some have restored their old streetcars and run them as a heritage ride for tourists; an example is the Vancouver Downtown Historic Railway.

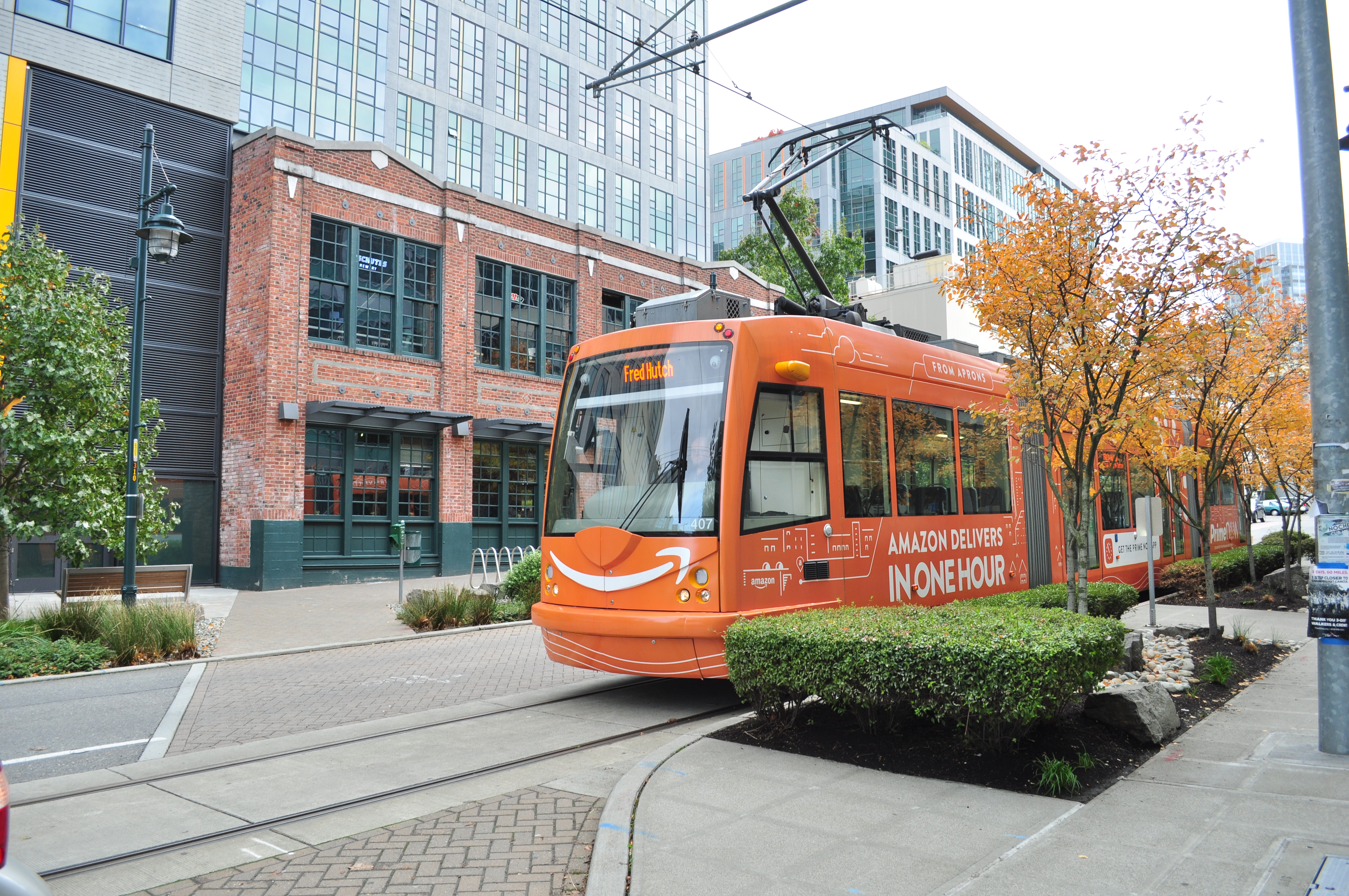
Seattle: streetcar on Terry Avenue

=== United States ===
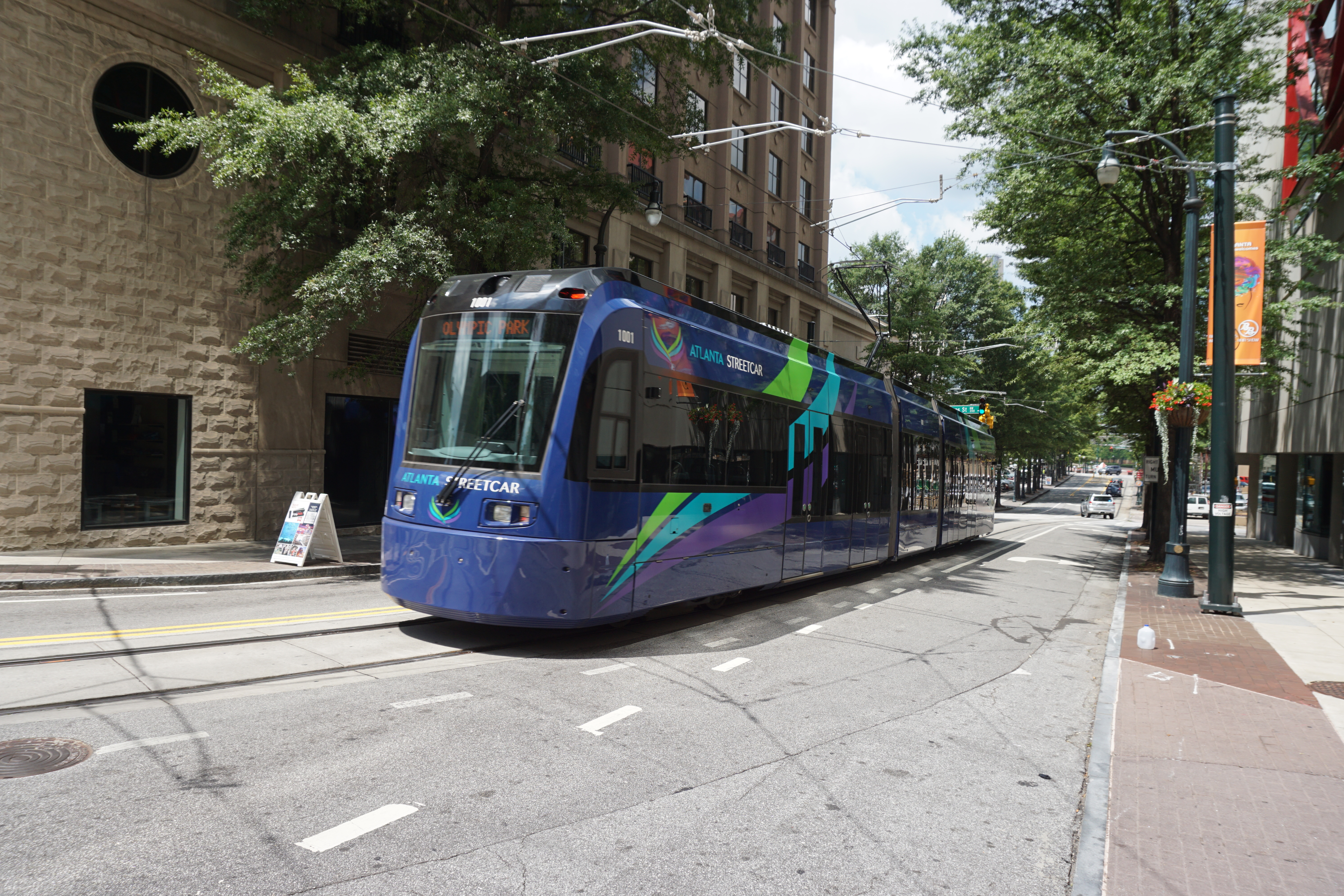
Atlanta Streetcar

Horsecars were in use on New York City streets as early as 1832, and the St. Charles Avenue Line of New Orleans' streetcar system is the oldest continuously operating street railway system in the world, beginning operation as a horse-drawn system in 1835. Motive power was eventually largely transitioned to steam engine-hauled locomotives, then in 1873 the first practical cable car line was tested in San Francisco. As electric traction became popular, streetcar and interurban systems proliferated across the United States. Passenger interurban railways had largely declined in use by the late 1920s. The Great Depression led to the closure of many streetcar lines, but World War II stopped the closure of many systems as they provided transportation during a time when gasoline and rubber tires were rationed. Pittsburgh kept most of its streetcar system (serving the city and many suburbs) until January 27, 1967, making it the longest-lasting large-network U.S. streetcar system.

Exceptions to streetcar closures of the 1960s included the cities of New Orleans, Newark, Seattle, Philadelphia, Boston, and San Francisco. These systems generally had more lines and larger service areas which were replaced by buses or largely scaled back. These surviving "legacy" systems generally used preexisting tunnels, had exclusive right of ways, or were upgraded to light rail specifications around the 1980s.

The San Diego Trolley inaugurated service in 1981 as the first newly built light rail system in the United States since the 1950s. The American Public Transportation Association counts 33 light rail systems operating in the country as of 2019.

== South America ==
=== Argentina ===
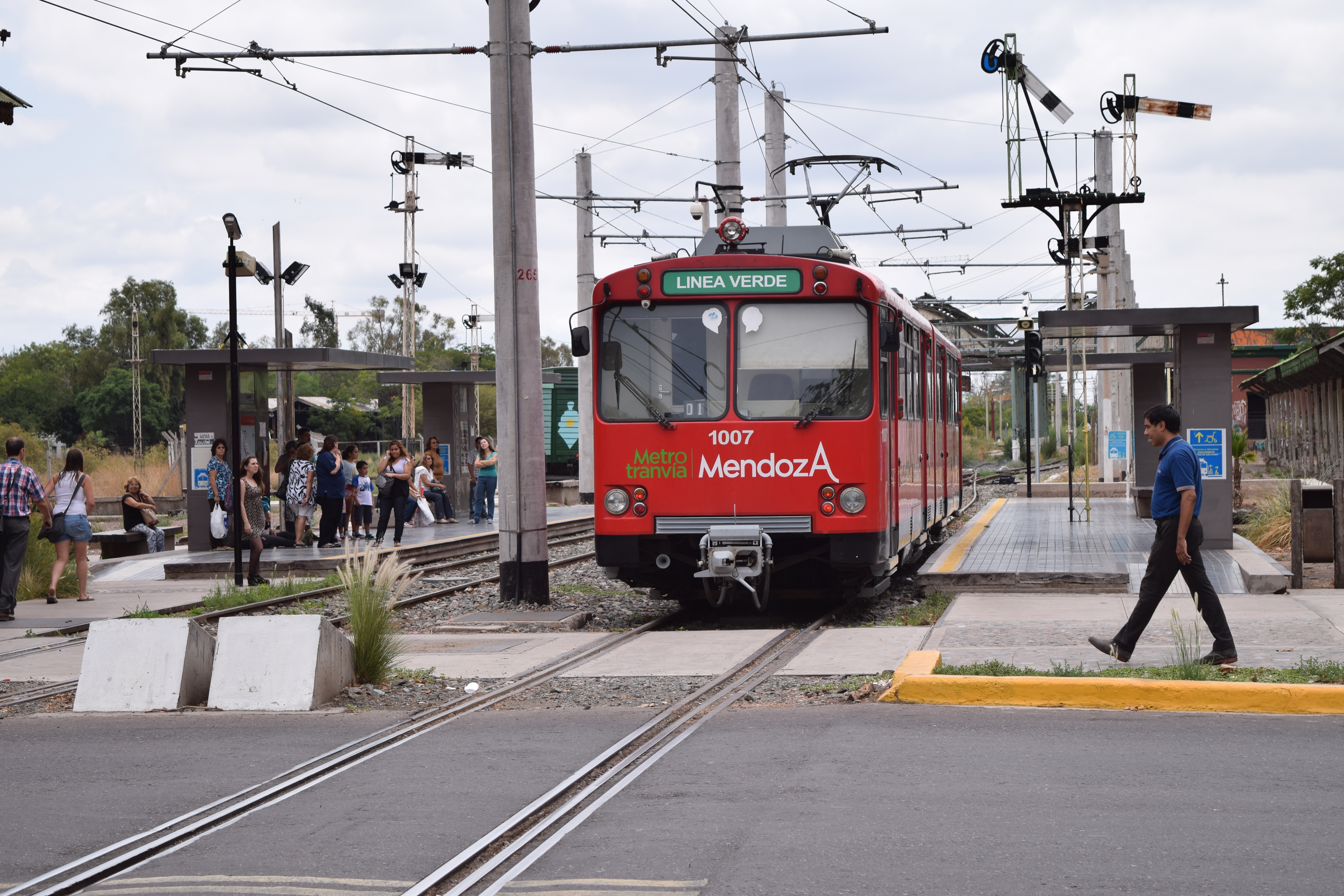
Former San Diego light rail car in service on the Metrotranvía Mendoza in 2015

Buenos Aires (once known as the City of Trams) had one of the world's most extensive networks, with over 857 km (535 mi) of track. Most of it was dismantled during the 1960s in favor of bus transportation.

The Anglo-Argentine Tramways Company opened Latin America's first underground tram system, Subte Line A, in 1913. The original route was underground and at street level until 1926, and pantograph cars—built by La Brugeoise in Belgium—had low doors at the ends (for boarding from the street) and high doors in the middle (for boarding from a tunnel platform). Subte Line A is arguably one of the continent's first light metros. The vintage carriages (without the end doors) remained in operation until 2013.

Using Line A's surface non-revenue tracks in the Caballito neighborhood, the Asociación Amigos del Tranvía (Friends of the Tramway Association) operates a heritage streetcar service with restored tram and metro cars on weekends and holidays from the Polvorín Workshop. The Tren de la Costa (Coastal Train), a light-rail service running on a right-of-way formerly used from 1891 to 1961, began in 1995. Serving tourists and commuters, it runs from the northern suburbs of Buenos Aires to Tigre along the Paraná River for about 15 kilometres (9.3 mi). The PreMetro E2 operates as a feeder at the end of Metro Line E in the western suburbs. In central Buenos Aires, the Tranvía del Este (or Puerto Madero Tramway) was an experimental tramway which operated on a 2-kilometre (1.2 mi) route in the Puerto Madero District from 2007 to 2012 with a single-car Alstom Citadis tram—two cars during the first year—on loan from Madrid. Planned extensions did not come to fruition, and low ridership led to a decision to discontinue service. The 12.6-kilometre (7.8 mi) Metrotranvía Mendoza (Mendoza Light Rail) opened for regular service in the city of Mendoza in October 2012, operating on relaid tracks on a former Ferrocarril General San Martín mainline right-of-way with LRVs (light-rail vehicles) acquired from San Diego, California.

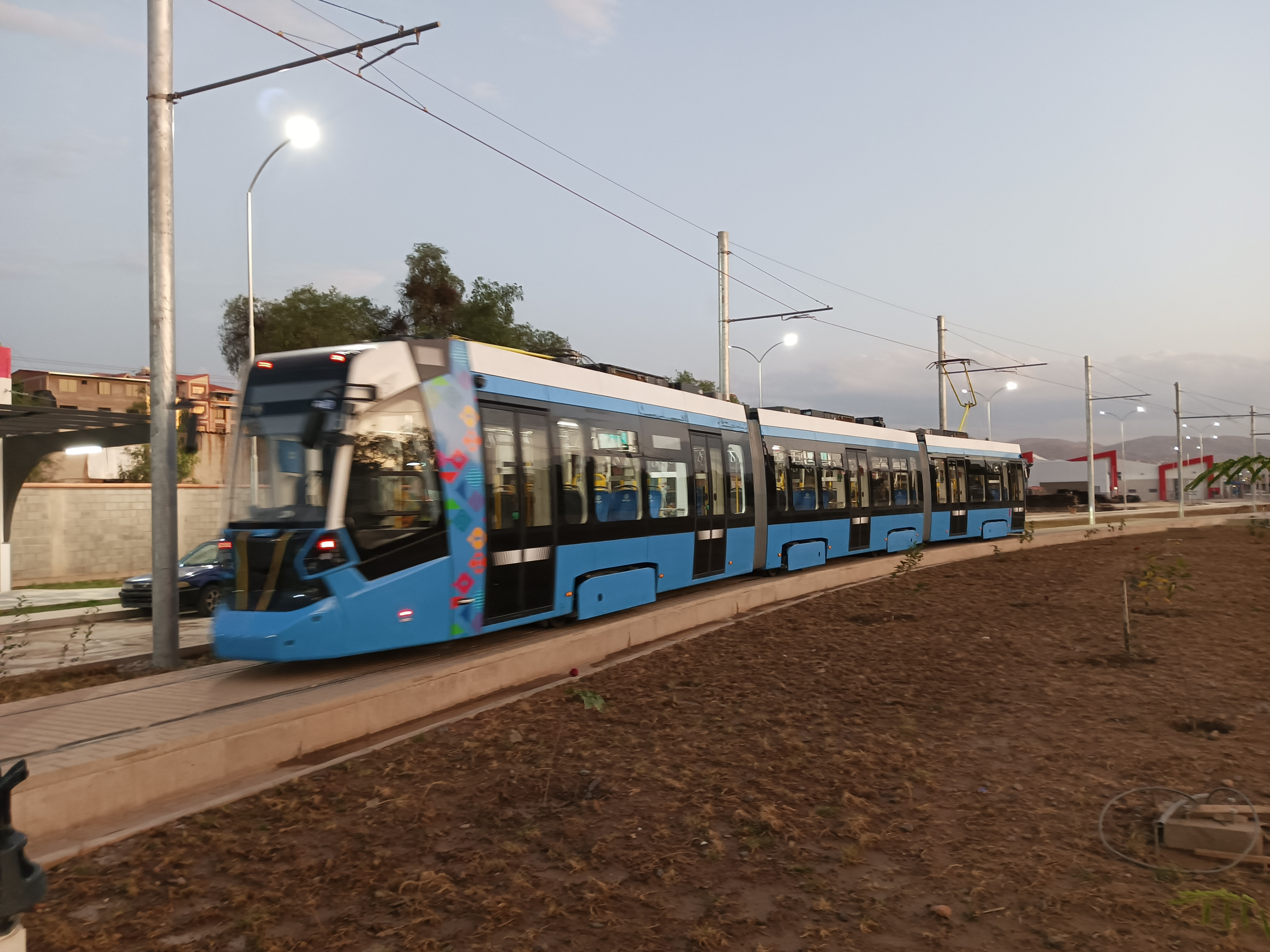
Stadler 85601M - Mi Tren

=== Bolivia ===
In 2022, Bolivia's first light rail network, known as Mi Tren, begun operation. It will be expanded to become a network of three lines.

=== Brazil ===
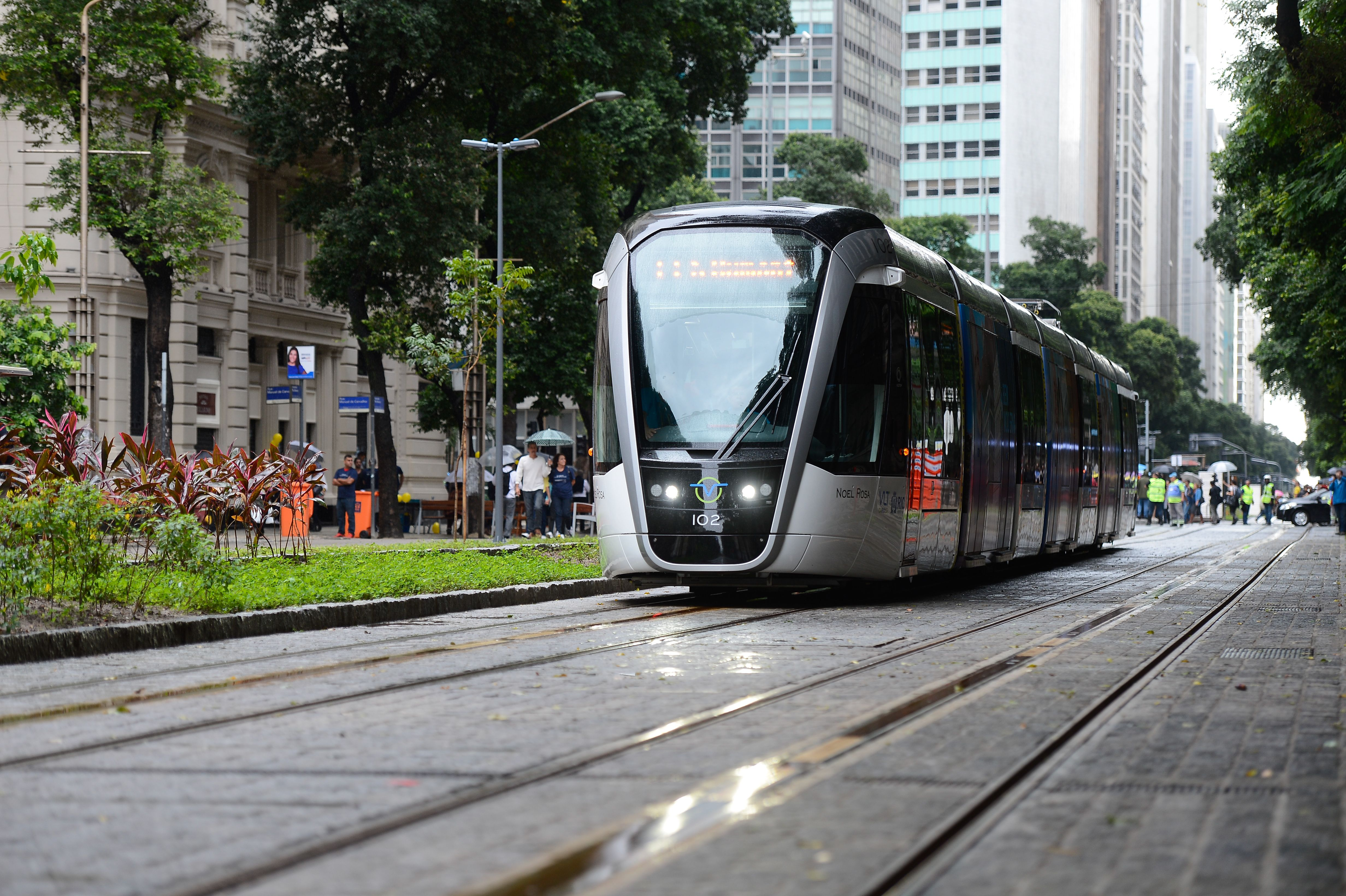
VLT Carioca light rail of Rio de Janeiro

Brazil has several light-rail networks, some are of the diesel light rail variant. Rio de Janeiro has the largest system, with three lines, 42 stations and 30 kilometres (19 mi) of rail lines. Santos, Maceio, Fortaleza, Recife, Cariri, Sobral and Cuiaba also have light rail. The city of Santos has a 12-kilometre (7.5 mi) line with 15 stations, connecting Santos to São Vicente (with plans to extend to Cubatão, Guarujá and Praia Grande). Fortaleza has a 20-kilometre (12 mi), 10-station line. Recife has two lines with nine stations each and 32 kilometres (20 mi) of track. Sobral has a 12-station, 14 kilometres (8.7 mi) line. The nine-station, 14-kilometre (8.7 mi) Cariri Light Rail connects the twin cities of Crato and Juazeiro do Norte. Maceió has a 15-station, 35-kilometre (22 mi) line. Cuiabá, with two lines, 23 kilometres (14 mi) of track and 33 stations, is in the final stages of implementing its light-rail system.

=== Colombia ===
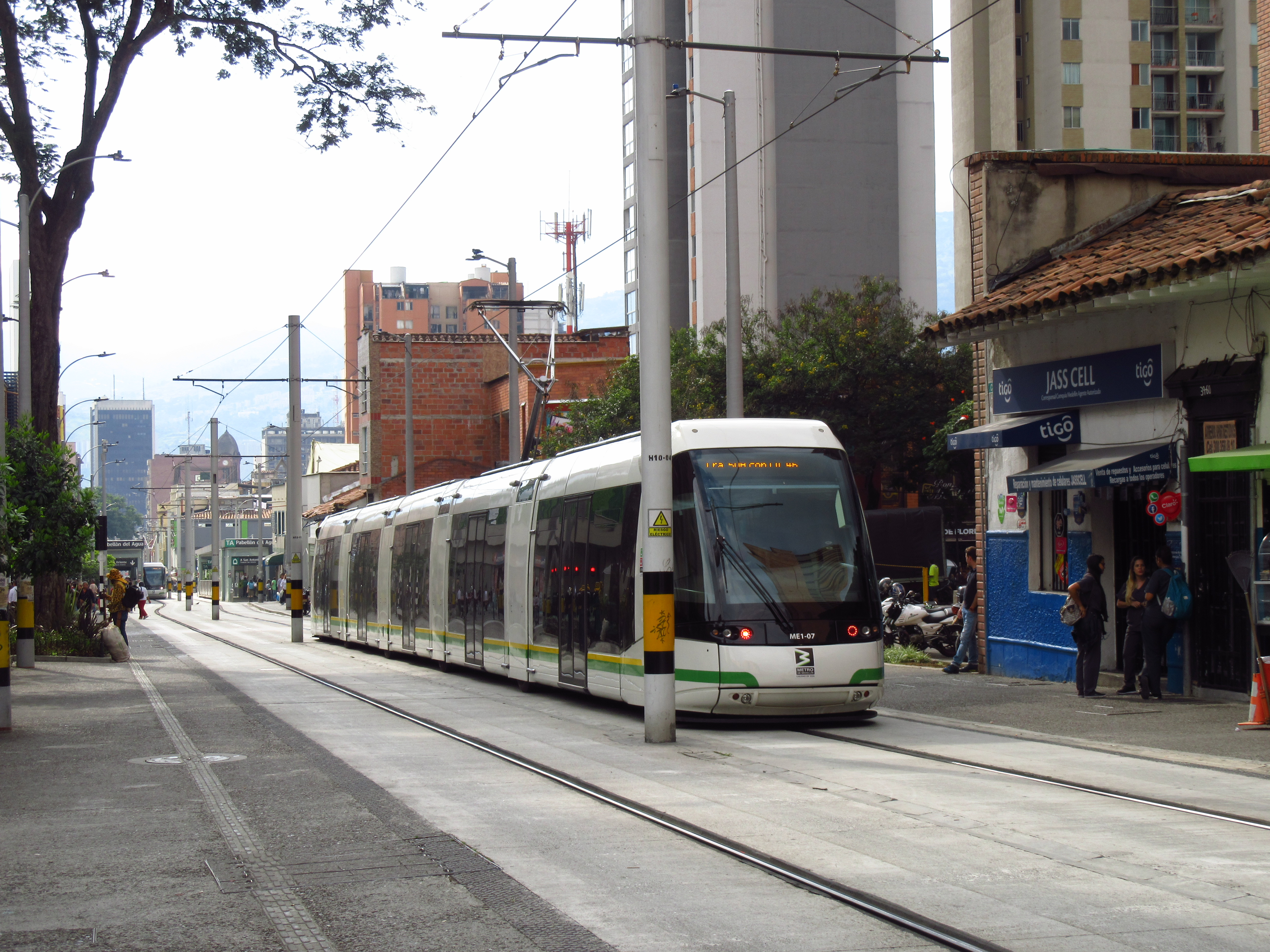
Ayacucho Tram in Medellín

It Opened in 15 October 2015 as Translohr tram in city of Medellín and consists of 9 stations and 1 line and line length of 4.3 km (2.7 mi) with two tracks and Ridership 10 million people.

=== Ecuador ===
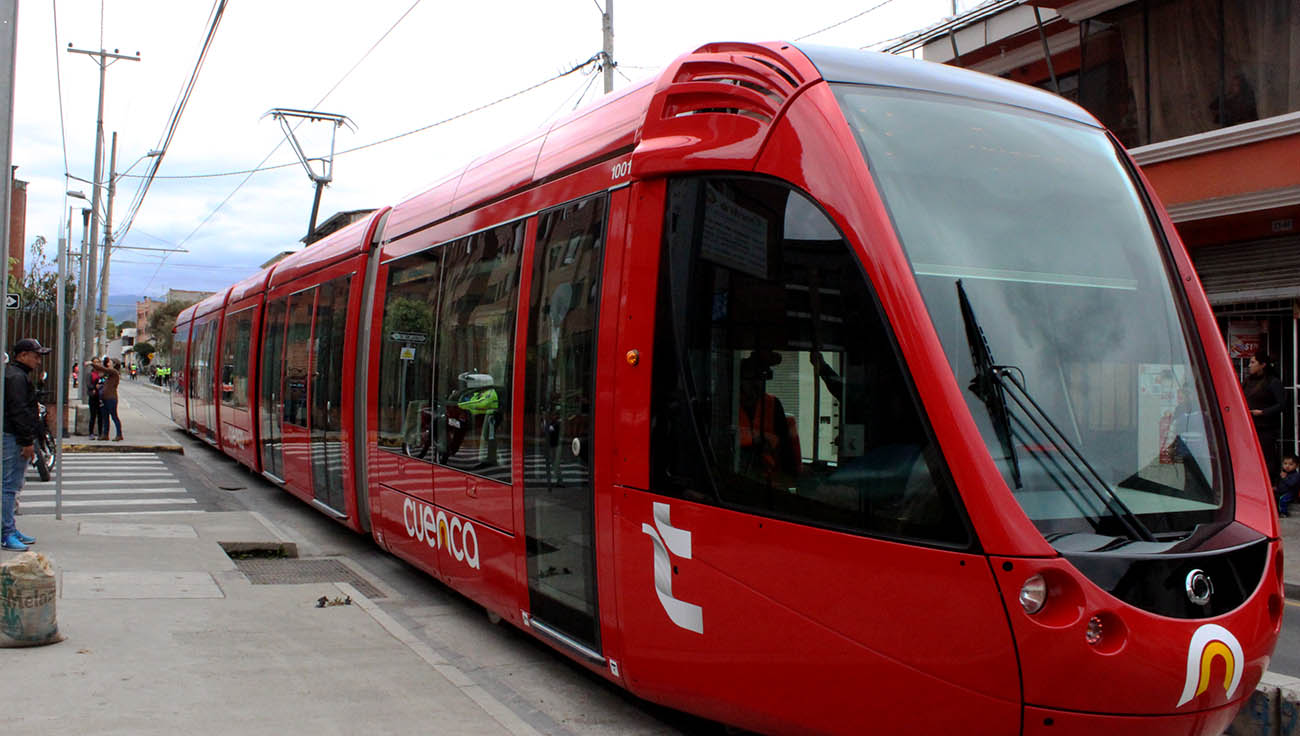
Cuenca Tramway in Cuenca, Ecuador

The first line of a new tram system in the Ecuadorian city of Cuenca, the Tranvía de Cuenca (Cuenca Tramway), opened in May 2020.

== Oceania ==
=== Australia ===
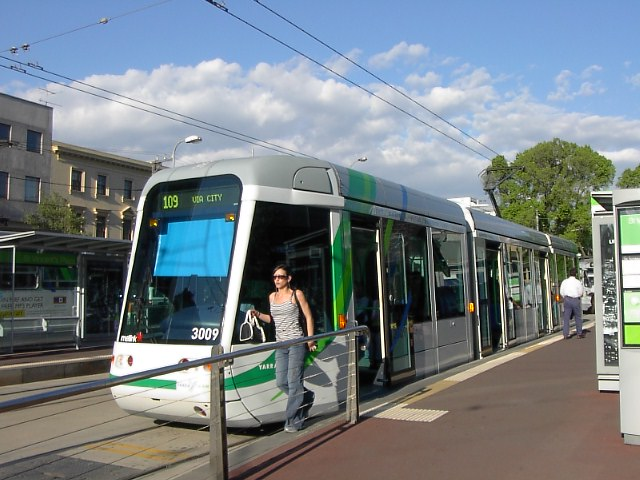
Alstom Citadis in Melbourne. (locally designated C-class)

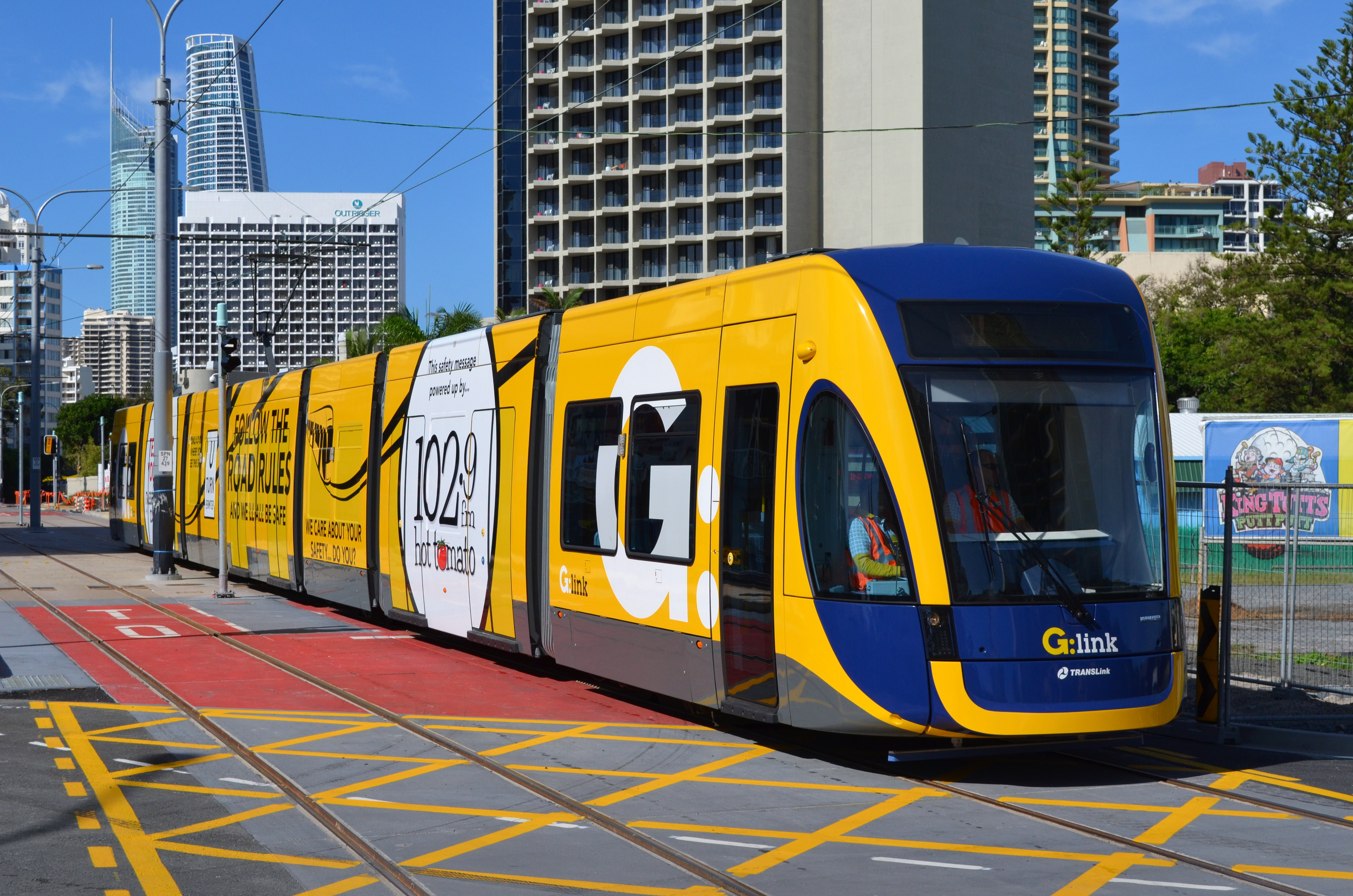
Flexity 2 on the Gold Coast

Trams are used extensively in Melbourne, which is the world's largest operating urban tram network, while all other major cities largely dismantled their legacy networks by the 1970s. Adelaide retained one line between the city and Glenelg (which has been extended), and work on a new line is in progress.

Sydney reintroduced tram service on the Inner West Light Rail line in 1997, with a pair of lines, the CBD and South East Light Rail, following in 2019. The first stage of the Parramatta Light Rail opened in late 2024, serving Sydney's secondary central business district, Parramatta, and is separated from the existing light rail network.

The 2010s saw increased investment in new light rail construction with the Gold Coast opening the G:link in 2014, Canberra opening its first light rail line in 2019 and Newcastle opening a new line in the same year.

=== New Zealand ===
Christchurch and Auckland have reintroduced trams as heritage operations.

A distinctive feature of many classic Australasian trams was their early use of a lowered central section between bogies (wheel sets), intended to make passenger access easier by reducing the number of steps required to reach the inside of the vehicle. Cars with this feature were known as "drop-centres".

== See also ==
- List of tram and light rail transit systems (existing, regular public-transit systems)
- List of town tramway systems (includes closed systems)
