= Ford City, Ontario =

Former town in Ontario, Canada

Coordinates: 42.3113°N 82.9908°W

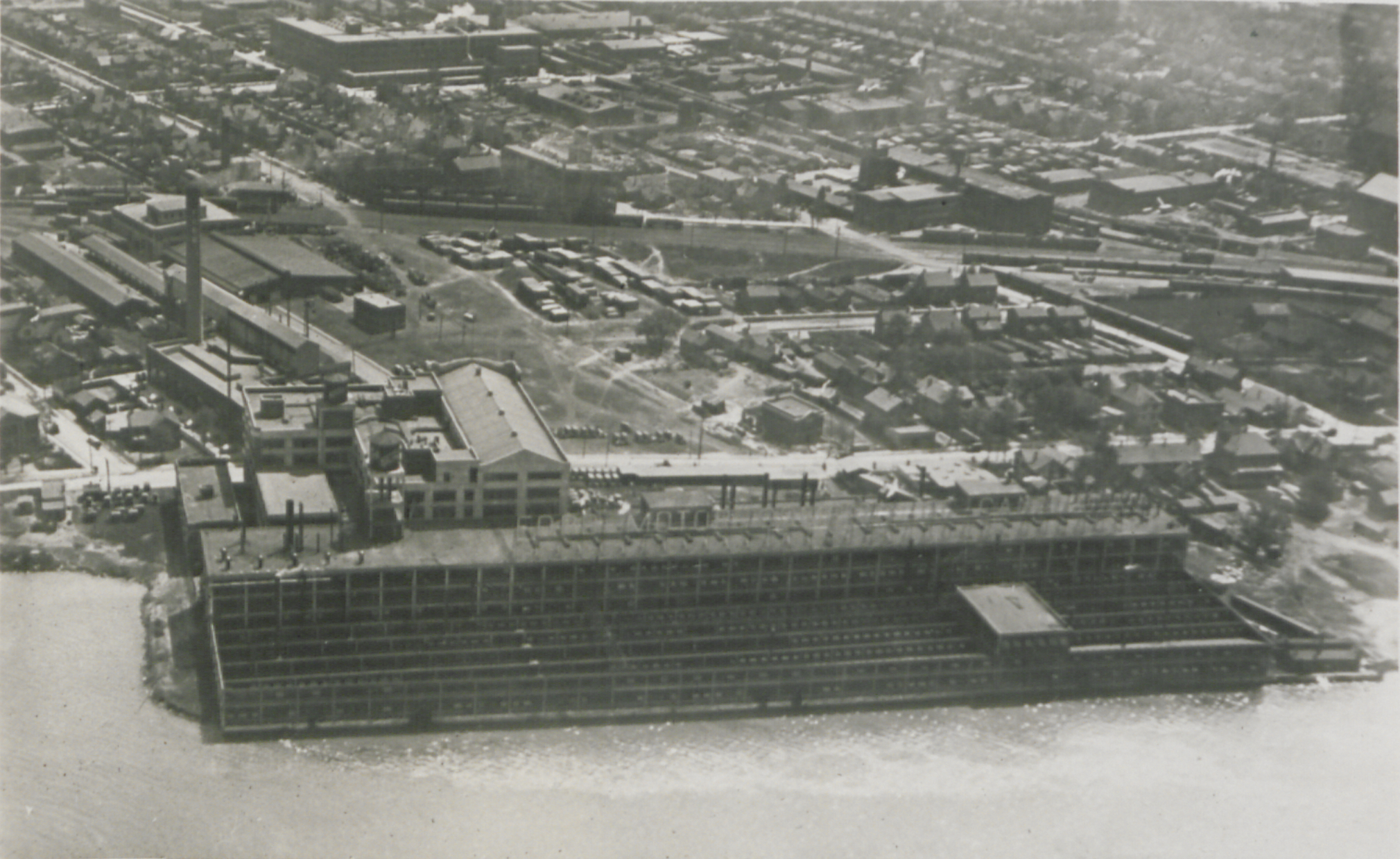
Ford plant and Ford City in 1920

Ford City was a community in the Canadian province of Ontario, located within the municipal boundaries of Windsor. The community was founded by the Ford Motor Company in the early 1900s as a separate company town where Ford had a big plant at the corner of Riverside Drive and Drouillard Road, which at one point employed 14,000 people.

The boundaries east to west were Pillette Avenue to Walker Road, and the north and south boundaries were Riverside Drive to Grand Marais Boulevard. Ford City's downtown main street was Drouillard Avenue, named after François Drouillard (an early settler who owned a farm along the general location of the street, which evolved from a private path on his property). The last remaining building of Ford is the engine plant.

The town was sparsely-populated and mostly farmland until the Walkerville Wagon Works partnered with Henry Ford (the namesake of the town) to build and import automobiles to Canada at a lower tariff rate by having the Ford Motor Company provide them with the incomplete automobiles and their parts, with Walkerville Wagon Works performing final assembly for domestic (Canadian) purchase. This partnership was Ford Motor Company of Canada, and by 1910, it would move to an even bigger facility in Ford City. By 1913, the community was incorporated as a village with Charles Montreuil as its first mayor, reaching town status just two years later. In 1928, the town legally changed its name to East Windsor and incorporated itself as a city in 1929, though the Great Depression took its toll on the community. With the town facing bankruptcy in 1935, Ford City was merged into the City of Windsor by the provincial government, along with the towns of Sandwich and Walkerville.

The community of Ford City first made national headlines on August 22, 1917, when hundreds of French Canadian parishioners mourning the death of their nationalist pastor, Fr. Lucien Alexandre Beaudoin, formed a blockade refusing to admit their newly appointed priest, Fr. François Xavier Laurendeau, believing he was in favour of the provincial school policy, Regulation 17, which had severely restricted the use of French in the area's bilingual schools. For more than two weeks, the parishioners mounted an around the clock blockade refusing the priest admission to the parish grounds and residence. On September 3, the Catholic Bishop of London, Michael Francis Fallon, sent the parishioners an ultimatum: accept the new priest or face the closure of the church. The warning failed to produce any results. On Saturday, September 8, 1917, Fr. Laurendeau returned to the parish with a police escort of 12 constables. The protesters, who were tipped off by a phone call of Laurendeau's impending return, rang the church bells, and the grounds were soon occupied by more than 3000 parishioners. When Laurendeau and his police escort arrived, they faced a sizeable blockade. The police escort pulled out their billy clubs to make their way through the crowd. Amid the pushing, shoving and shouting, someone threw the first blow and a full-scale riot broke out. Through a shower of bricks, rocks, fists, brooms and clubs, the constables managed to reach the church residence. The mayor, Albert Maisonville, was forced to read the Riot Act and call upon the military for back up. When the riot finally settled down, nine men had been arrested, and nine people had been seriously injured, including two elderly women who had fiercely resisted the police on the front steps of the church rectory with broomsticks. For more than a year, the parishioners boycotted masses celebrated by Laurendeau and appealed to Pope Benedict XV to replace him. In October 1918, the Vatican ordered the parishioners to accept the new pastor under pain of excommunication, ending the boycott. These events came to represent the culmination of the Franco-Ontarian community's resistance to Bishop Fallon and his vocal support of the Government of Ontario's imposition of Regulation 17.

The area is also famous for the historic 99-day 1945 Ford Strike during which the workers fought to be unionized, and set up a blockade around the plant. The Rand Formula was created at the end of the strike where workers would have to pay union dues for having a union in their workplaces, which set the standard for all unions in Canada. Ford left Windsor for Oakville in 1953, closing the Riverside Drive plant by 1960 and leaving thousands unemployed as only the casting and engine plants remained.
